= Outline of tornadoes =

List of articles related to tornadoes

The following outline is provided as an overview and topical guide to tornadoes:

== General information ==
- Tornado
- Glossary of tornado terms
- Groups of tornadoes
  - Tornado family
  - Tornado outbreak
- Tornadogenesis, the term for the formation of tornadoes
  - Funnel cloud
  - Mesocyclone
  - Rear flank downdraft
  - Supercell
  - Wall cloud
- Types of tornadoes
  - Anticyclonic tornado
  - Multiple-vortex tornado
  - Nocturnal tornado
  - Satellite tornado
  - Skipping tornado
  - Waterspout
  - Landspout
  - Similar circulations which are by definition, not tornadoes
    - Gustnado
    - Dust devil
    - Fire whirl
    - Steam devil
- Tornado impacts
  - Cycloidal marks
  - Debris fallout
  - Power flash
- Tornado climatology
  - Dixie Alley
  - South American Tornado Alley
  - Tornado Alley
- Tornado records
- Tornado preparedness
- Tornado myths
  - Overpass myth
- Tornadic infrasound
- Storm chasing
- Lilapsophobia
- Storm cellar

=== Tornado forecasting ===
- Convective storm detection
  - Hook echo
  - Tornado debris signature
  - Tornado vortex signature
- Particularly dangerous situation
- Tornado warning
  - Tornado emergency
    - List of tornado emergencies
- Tornado watch

==== Forecasting agencies ====
- European Severe Storms Laboratory
- Meteorological Service of Canada
- National Weather Service
  - List of National Weather Service Weather Forecast Offices
  - Storm Prediction Center
    - List of Storm Prediction Center high risk days
    - Significant tornado parameter

=== Tornado ratings ===
- Tornado intensity
  - Fujita scale (F scale)
  - Enhanced Fujita scale (EF scale)
    - EF5 drought
  - International Fujita scale (IF scale)
    - List of tornadoes rated on the 2018 International Fujita scale
  - TORRO scale (T scale)
  - Tornado damage survey
  - Disagreements on the intensity of tornadoes
- List of F3, EF3, and IF3 tornadoes (2020–present)
- List of F4, EF4, and IF4 tornadoes
  - List of F4 tornadoes (1950–1959)
  - List of F4 tornadoes (1960–1969)
  - List of F4 and EF4 tornadoes (2000–2009)
  - List of F4 and EF4 tornadoes (2010–2019)
  - List of F4, EF4, and IF4 tornadoes (2020–present)
- List of F5, EF5, and IF5 tornadoes
- List of tornado outbreaks by Outbreak Intensity Score

== Tornado events ==
- Lists of tornadoes and tornado outbreaks
- List of tornadoes by width
- List of tropical cyclones spawning tornadoes

=== Tornadoes and tornado outbreaks by impact ===
- List of costliest tornadoes in the Americas
- List of deadliest tornadoes in the Americas
- List of schools struck by tornadoes

=== Tornadoes and tornado outbreaks by location ===
- List of African tornadoes and tornado outbreaks
- List of Asian tornadoes and tornado outbreaks
  - List of Indian tornadoes
  - List of Indonesia tornadoes
- List of European tornadoes and tornado outbreaks
  - Tornadoes in Iceland
- List of North American tornadoes and tornado outbreaks
  - Tornadoes in Bermuda
  - Lists of Canadian tornadoes and tornado outbreaks
    - List of Canadian tornadoes and tornado outbreaks (2000–present)
    - List of Canadian tornadoes and tornado outbreaks (pre-2000)
    - List of tornadoes by province (Canada)
    - List of fatal and violent Canadian tornadoes
    - Tornadoes in Atlantic Canada
  - Tornadoes in the United States
    - Lists of tornadoes in the United States
    - Tornadoes in Alabama
      - List of tornadoes in Huntsville, Alabama
    - List of Alaska tornadoes
    - List of California tornadoes
    - List of Hawaii tornadoes
    - List of Illinois tornadoes
      - Tornadoes in Chicago
    - List of Iowa tornadoes
    - List of Michigan tornadoes
    - Tornadoes in New England
      - List of Connecticut tornadoes
      - List of Rhode Island tornadoes
    - List of New Jersey tornadoes
    - List of New York tornadoes
    - Tornadoes in Oklahoma
      - List of tornadoes in Cleveland County, Oklahoma
    - List of Ohio tornadoes
    - St. Louis tornado history
    - List of Texas tornadoes
    - List of Washington (state) tornadoes
    - List of tornadoes in Washington, D.C.
    - List of West Virginia tornadoes
- List of Oceania tornadoes and tornado outbreaks
  - List of Australian tornadoes
  - List of New Zealand tornadoes
- List of South American tornadoes and tornado outbreaks
- List of tornadoes striking downtown areas of large cities

=== Tornadoes and tornado outbreaks in chronological order ===
- List of individual tornadoes by year
- List of tornado events by year

==== Before 1800 ====
- Tornadoes of 1091
  - London tornado of 1091
- Tornadoes of 1551/1556
  - Grand Harbour of Malta tornado
- Tornadoes of 1680
  - 1680 Lexington, Massachusetts tornado
- Tornadoes of 1764
  - 1764 Woldegk tornado
- Tornadoes of 1787
  - Four-State Tornado Swarm

==== 1800–1899 ====
- Tornadoes of 1821
  - September 1821 New England tornado outbreak
- Tornadoes of 1835
  - 1835 Middlesex County tornado
- Tornadoes of 1840
  - Great Natchez Tornado
- Tornadoes of 1845
  - 1845 Montville tornado
- Tornadoes of 1846
  - 1846 Grenada tornado
- Tornadoes of 1855
  - 1855 Des Plaines tornado
- Tornadoes of 1856
  - 1856 Philadelphia tornado
- Tornadoes of 1865
  - 1865 Viroqua tornado
- Tornadoes of 1871
  - 1871 St. Louis tornado
- Tornadoes of 1875
  - March 1875 Southeast tornado outbreak
- Tornadoes of 1876
  - 1876 Bowen tornado
- Tornadoes of 1878
  - 1878 Wallingford tornado
- Tornadoes of 1879
  - 1879 Bouctouche tornado
- Tornadoes of 1880
  - Tornado outbreak of April 1880
    - Marshfield Cyclone
- Tornadoes of 1881
  - Tornado outbreak of June 1881
  - 1881 Minnesota tornado outbreak
- Tornadoes of 1882
  - 1882 Grinnell tornado
- Tornadoes of 1883
  - Tornado outbreak of April 21–23, 1883
  - 1883 Rochester tornado
- Tornadoes of 1884
  - Enigma tornado outbreak
  - 1884 Garnett tornado
  - Tornado outbreak of August 28, 1884
    - 1884 Howard tornado
- Tornadoes of 1886
  - 1886 St. Cloud–Sauk Rapids tornado outbreak
- Tornadoes of 1890
  - Tornado outbreak of March 27, 1890
  - 1890 Wilkes-Barre tornado
- Tornadoes of 1892
  - Southern Minnesota tornadoes of June 15, 1892
- Tornadoes of 1893
  - 1893 Pomeroy tornado
- Tornadoes of 1896
  - Tornado outbreaks of mid-to-late May, 1896
    - 1896 Sherman tornado
    - 1896 St. Louis–East St. Louis tornado
- Tornadoes of 1898
  - 1898 Fort Smith tornadoes
- Tornadoes of 1899
  - 1899 New Richmond tornado

==== 1900–1949 ====
- Tornadoes of 1900
  - 1900 Westchester County tornado
  - Tornado outbreak of November 20–21, 1900
- Tornadoes of 1902
  - 1902 Goliad tornado
- Tornadoes of 1903
  - 1903 Gainesville tornado
- Tornadoes of 1904
  - 1904 Moscow tornado
  - 1904 Chappaqua tornado
- Tornadoes of 1905
  - 1905 Snyder tornado
- Tornadoes of 1908
  - 1908 Dixie tornado outbreak
- Tornadoes of 1909
  - Tornado outbreak of April 29 – May 1, 1909
- Tornadoes of 1911
  - Great Blue Norther of November 11, 1911
- Tornadoes of 1912
  - Tornado outbreak of April 20–22, 1912
  - Tornado outbreak of April 27–29, 1912
  - Regina Cyclone
- Tornadoes of 1913
  - Tornado outbreak of March 13–14, 1913
  - Tornado outbreak of March 20–21, 1913
  - 1913 Easter tornado outbreak
  - 1913 United Kingdom tornado outbreak
- Tornadoes of 1916
  - Tornado outbreak of June 5–6, 1916
- Tornadoes of 1917
  - Tornado outbreak of March 23, 1917
  - Tornado outbreak sequence of May 25 – June 1, 1917
- Tornadoes of 1918
  - 1918 Brighton tornado
  - 1918 Tyler tornado
- Tornadoes of 1919
  - Tornado outbreak of April 9, 1919
  - 1919 Fergus Falls tornado
- Tornadoes of 1920
  - 1920 Palm Sunday tornado outbreak
  - April 1920 tornado outbreak
- Tornadoes of 1922
  - 1922 Austin twin tornadoes
- Tornadoes of 1924
  - Tornado outbreak of April 29–30, 1924
  - 1924 Sandusky–Lorain tornado
  - 1924 Thurman tornado
- Tornadoes of 1925
  - Tornado outbreak of March 17–18, 1925
    - 1925 Tri-State tornado
  - 1925 Miami tornado
- Tornadoes of 1926
  - 1926 Encarnación tornado
- Tornadoes of 1927
  - 1927 Rocksprings tornado
  - Tornado outbreak of May 7–9, 1927
  - Tornado outbreak of July 8–9, 1927
  - Tornado outbreak of September 29, 1927
- Tornadoes of 1928
  - 1928 Rockford tornado
- Tornadoes of 1929
  - 1929 Sneed tornado
  - 1929 Rye Cove tornado outbreak
- Tornadoes of 1930
  - 1930 Montello tornado
- Tornadoes of 1931
  - 1931 Birmingham tornado
  - 1931 Lublin tornado
- Tornadoes of 1932
  - 1932 Deep South tornado outbreak
- Tornadoes of 1933
  - March 1933 Nashville tornado outbreak
  - Tornado outbreak sequence of May 4–10, 1933
- Tornadoes of 1936
  - 1936 Cordele–Greensboro tornado outbreak
  - 1936 Tupelo–Gainesville tornado outbreak
- Tornadoes of 1938
  - 1938 Rodessa tornado
- Tornadoes of 1942
  - Tornado outbreak of March 16–17, 1942
  - Tornado outbreak of May 2, 1942
- Tornadoes of 1943
  - 1943 Hackleburg tornado
- Tornadoes of 1944
  - 1944 South Dakota–Minnesota tornado outbreak
  - 1944 Appalachians tornado outbreak
    - 1944 Shinnston tornado
- Tornadoes of 1945
  - Tornado outbreak of February 12, 1945
  - Tornado outbreak of April 12, 1945
- Tornadoes of 1946
  - List of United States tornadoes in 1946
    - Tornado outbreak of January 4–6, 1946
    - Tornado outbreak of May 23–24, 1946
    - 1946 Windsor–Tecumseh tornado
- Tornadoes of 1947
  - Tornado outbreak of April 9–11, 1947
    - 1947 Higgins–Woodward tornado
- Tornadoes of 1948
  - 1948 Tinker Air Force Base tornadoes
- Tornadoes of 1949
  - Tornado outbreak of January 3, 1949
  - Tornado outbreak of April 30 – May 1, 1949
  - Tornado outbreak of May 20–22, 1949

==== 1950s ====
- Tornadoes of 1950
  - List of United States tornadoes in 1950
    - Tornado outbreak of February 11–13, 1950
    - Tornado outbreak of March 26–27, 1950
    - Tornado outbreak of April 28–29, 1950
- Tornadoes of 1951
  - List of United States tornadoes in 1951
    - 1951 Corn tornado
    - Tornado outbreak of June 19, 1951
    - Tornado outbreak sequence of June 25–27, 1951
    - Great Lakes tornadoes of September 26, 1951
- Tornadoes of 1952
  - List of United States tornadoes in 1952
    - Tornado outbreak of February 13, 1952
    - Tornado outbreak of Leap Day 1952
    - Tornado outbreak of March 21–22, 1952
    - Tornado outbreak of May 21–24, 1952
    - Tornado outbreak of June 23–24, 1952
- Tornadoes of 1953
  - Tornado outbreak of March 12–15, 1953
  - Tornado outbreak sequence of April 28 – May 2, 1953
  - Tornado outbreak of May 9–11, 1953
    - 1953 Waco tornado
  - 1953 Sarnia tornado outbreak
    - 1953 Sarnia tornado
  - Tornado outbreak of May 29, 1953
  - Tornado outbreak of June 7–9, 1953
    - 1953 Flint–Beecher tornado
    - Worcester tornado
  - Tornado outbreak of June 27, 1953
  - Tornado outbreak sequence of December 1–6, 1953
    - 1953 Vicksburg tornado
- Tornadoes of 1954
  - Tornado outbreak of March 24–25, 1954
  - List of United States tornadoes from April to June 1954
    - Tornado outbreak sequence of April 5–8, 1954
  - Tornado outbreak of December 5, 1954
  - 1954 London tornado
- Tornadoes of 1955
  - 1955 Great Plains tornado outbreak
    - 1955 Udall tornado
  - 1955 Scottsbluff tornado
  - Tornado outbreak of November 15–16, 1955
- Tornadoes of 1956
  - Tornado outbreak of April 2–3, 1956
    - 1956 Berlin tornado
    - 1956 Saugatuck–Holland tornado
  - 1956 McDonald Chapel tornado
- Tornadoes of 1957
  - Tornado outbreak sequence of April 2–5, 1957
    - List of tornadoes in the outbreak sequence of April 2–5, 1957
  - Tornado outbreak of April 8, 1957
  - Tornado outbreak of May 19–22, 1957
    - 1957 Ruskin Heights tornado
  - Tornado outbreak of May 24–25, 1957
  - Tornado outbreak sequence of June 20–23, 1957
    - Fargo tornado
  - Tornado outbreak of November 7–8, 1957
  - Tornado outbreak sequence of December 18–20, 1957
- Tornadoes of 1958
  - Tornado outbreak of April 15, 1958
  - Tornado outbreak of June 3–4, 1958
- Tornadoes of 1959
  - St. Louis tornado outbreak of February 1959

==== 1960s ====
- Tornadoes of 1960
  - Tornado outbreak of April 28–30, 1960
  - May 1960 tornado outbreak sequence
- Tornadoes of 1961
  - Tornado outbreak of February 24−25, 1961
  - Tornado outbreak sequence of April 23–30, 1961
  - Tornado outbreak sequence of May 3–9, 1961
  - Hurricane Carla tornado outbreak
- Tornadoes of 1962
  - Tornado outbreak of March 30–31, 1962
  - Tornado outbreak sequence of May 14–31, 1962
    - List of tornadoes in the outbreak sequence of May 14–31, 1962
- Tornadoes of 1963
- Tornadoes of 1964
  - 1964 Harpersville tornado
  - 1964 Wichita Falls tornado
  - 1964 Central Nebraska tornado
  - 1964 Chesterfield Township tornado
  - Hurricane Hilda tornado outbreak
    - 1964 Larose tornado
  - Hurricane Isbell tornado outbreak
- Tornadoes of 1965
  - Tornado outbreak of February 23, 1965
  - 1965 Palm Sunday tornado outbreak
    - List of tornadoes in the 1965 Palm Sunday tornado outbreak
  - Tornado outbreak of May 5–8, 1965
- Tornadoes of 1966
  - 1966 Jackson, Mississippi tornado
  - Tornado outbreak of April 4–5, 1966
  - Tornado outbreak sequence of June 1966
- Tornadoes of 1967
  - 1967 St. Louis tornado outbreak
  - Tornado outbreak of April 21, 1967
    - 1967 Belvidere tornado
    - 1967 Oak Lawn tornado
  - Tornado outbreak of April 30 – May 2, 1967
- Tornadoes of 1968
  - Tornado outbreak of April 21–24, 1968
  - Tornado outbreak of May 15–16, 1968
    - 1968 Charles City tornado
    - 1968 Oelwein–Maynard tornado
  - 1968 Tracy tornado
  - 1968 Black Forest tornado
- Tornadoes of 1969
  - 1969 Hazlehurst tornadoes
  - Tornado outbreak of August 6, 1969

==== 1970s ====
- Tornadoes of 1970
  - Bulahdelah tornado
  - Tornado outbreak of April 17–19, 1970
  - Lubbock tornado
  - Tornado outbreak sequence of June 10–16, 1970
  - Sudbury tornado
- Tornadoes of 1971
  - 1971 Mississippi Delta tornado outbreak
    - 1971 Inverness tornado
  - 1971 Gosser Ridge tornado
  - 1971 Joplin tornado
- Tornadoes of 1972
  - 1972 Portland–Vancouver tornadoes
  - Hurricane Agnes tornado outbreak
- Tornadoes of 1973
  - List of United States tornadoes from January to February 1973
  - 1973 San Justo tornado
  - List of United States tornadoes in March 1973
  - 1973 Faridpur District tornado
  - Tornado outbreak sequence of April 19–21, 1973
  - 1973 Union City tornado
  - 1973 Jonesboro tornado
  - 1973 Central Alabama tornado
  - 1973 Brisbane tornado
- Tornadoes of 1974
  - Tornado outbreak of April 1–2, 1974
  - 1974 Super Outbreak
    - List of tornadoes in the 1974 Super Outbreak
      - 1974 Xenia tornado
      - 1974 Guin tornado
      - 1974 Cincinnati tornado
      - 1974 Tanner tornadoes
      - 1974 Brandenburg tornado
  - Tornado outbreak of June 8–10, 1974
- Tornadoes of 1975
  - Great Storm of 1975
  - 1975 Omaha tornado outbreak
  - 1975 Canton, Illinois, tornado
- Tornadoes of 1976
  - 1976 Brownwood tornado
  - 1976 Jordan, Iowa tornado
- Tornadoes of 1977
  - Tornado outbreak of April 4–5, 1977
    - Southern Airways Flight 242
- Tornadoes of 1978
  - 1978 Pomona Lake tornado
  - 1978 Bossier City tornado outbreak
- Tornadoes of 1979
  - 1979 Red River Valley tornado outbreak
    - 1979 Wichita Falls tornado
  - 1979 Woodstock, Ontario tornadoes
  - Windsor Locks tornado

==== 1980s ====
- Tornadoes of 1980
  - Broward County tornadoes of March 1, 1980
  - 1980 Kalamazoo tornado
  - 1980 Grand Island tornado outbreak
  - Western Wisconsin Derecho
- Tornadoes of 1981
  - 1981 West Bend tornado
  - Tornado outbreak of May 22–23, 1981
  - NLM CityHopper Flight 431
  - 1981 United Kingdom tornado outbreak
- Tornadoes of 1982
  - List of United States tornadoes from January to March 1982
  - Tornado outbreak of April 2–3, 1982
  - 1982 Marion tornado outbreak
    - 1982 Marion, Illinois tornado
- Tornadoes of 1983
  - List of United States tornadoes from January to February 1983
    - February 1983 North American blizzard
  - 1983 South Central Los Angeles tornado
  - Cuba–Florida tornadoes of March 16–17, 1983
  - April 1983 Basirhat–Bongaon tornado outbreak
- Tornadoes of 1984
  - 1984 Carolinas tornado outbreak
  - 1984 Montgomery tornado
  - Tornado outbreak of June 7–8, 1984
  - 1984 Soviet Union tornado outbreak
- Tornadoes of 1985
  - 1985 United States–Canada tornado outbreak
    - 1985 Barrie tornado
    - 1985 Niles–Wheatland tornado
  - 1985 Hurricane Danny tornado outbreak
- Tornadoes of 1986
  - Tornado outbreak of March 10–12, 1986
- Tornadoes of 1987
  - 1987 Saragosa tornado
  - 1987 Teton–Yellowstone tornado
  - Edmonton tornado
- Tornadoes of 1988
  - 1988 Raleigh tornado outbreak
- Tornadoes of 1989
  - Daulatpur–Saturia tornado
  - May 1989 tornado outbreak
  - July 1989 Northeastern United States tornado outbreak
  - November 1989 tornado outbreak
    - 1989 Huntsville tornado
    - 1989 Coldenham tornado

==== 1990s ====
- Tornadoes of 1990
  - List of United States tornadoes from January to February 1990
  - Tornado outbreak of March 11–13, 1990
  - 1990 Bakersfield Valley tornado
  - June 1990 Lower Ohio Valley tornado outbreak
  - 1990 Manukan tornado
  - 1990 Plainfield tornado
- Tornadoes of 1991
  - 1991 Great Plains tornado outbreak
    - 1991 Andover tornado
    - 1991 Itu tornado
    - 1991 Springfield tornado
- Tornadoes of 1992
  - Tornado outbreak of June 14–18, 1992
    - 1992 Chandler–Lake Wilson tornado
  - Tornado outbreak of November 21–23, 1992
  - 1992 Queensland storms
    - 1992 Bucca tornado
- Tornadoes of 1993
  - 1993 Storm of the Century
  - 1993 Virginia tornado outbreak
  - Tornado outbreak of August 9, 1993
- Tornadoes of 1994
  - 1994 Palm Sunday tornado outbreak
  - Tornado outbreak of April 25–27, 1994
- Tornadoes of 1995
  - 1995 Joppa–Arab tornado
  - Tornado outbreak sequence of May 6–27, 1995
    - List of tornadoes in the May 1995 tornado outbreak sequence
      - 1995 Anderson Hills tornado
  - Great Barrington tornado
  - 1995 Texas Panhandle tornado outbreak
    - 1995 Pampa tornado
  - Pilot Butte storm of 1995
- Tornadoes of 1996
  - Tornado outbreak sequence of April 1996
    - 1996 Southern Ontario tornadoes
  - 1996 Bangladesh tornado
  - 1996 Oakfield tornado outbreak
- Tornadoes of 1997
  - Tornado outbreak of January 23–24, 1997
  - March 1997 tornado outbreak
  - 1997 Miami tornado
  - 1997 Central Texas tornado outbreak
    - Jarrell tornado
  - Tornado outbreak of July 1–3, 1997
  - October 1997 North American storm complex
- Tornadoes of 1998
  - 1998 Central Florida tornado outbreak
  - 1998 Gainesville–Stoneville tornado outbreak
  - 1998 Comfrey–St. Peter tornado outbreak
  - Tornado outbreak of April 6–9, 1998
    - 1998 Oak Grove–Birmingham tornado
  - Tornado outbreak of April 15–16, 1998
    - List of tornadoes in the outbreak of April 15–16, 1998
  - Tornado outbreak and derecho of May 30–31, 1998
    - 1998 Spencer tornado
  - Tornado outbreak of June 2, 1998
  - Tornado outbreak of June 13, 1998
  - Corn Belt derecho
  - Upper Great Lakes severe weather outbreak of August 23, 1998
  - Hurricane Georges tornado outbreak
  - 1998 Oklahoma tornado outbreak
- Tornadoes of 1999
  - Tornado outbreak of January 17–18, 1999
  - Tornado outbreak of January 21–23, 1999
  - Tornado outbreak of April 2–3, 1999
    - 1999 Shreveport–Bossier City tornado
  - Tornado outbreak of April 8–9, 1999
  - 1999 Great Plains tornado outbreak
    - List of tornadoes in the 1999 Great Plains tornado outbreak
      - 1999 Bridge Creek–Moore tornado
      - 1999 Haysville–Wichita tornado
      - 1999 Dover–Hennessey tornado
      - 1999 Mulhall tornado
  - 1999 Loyal Valley tornado
  - 1999 Salt Lake City tornado
  - 1999 Manenberg tornado

==== 2000s ====
- Tornadoes of 2000
  - List of United States tornadoes from January to February 2000
    - Tornado outbreak of February 13–14, 2000
  - 2000 Fort Worth tornado outbreak
  - Tornado outbreak of April 23, 2000
  - Pine Lake tornado
  - 2000 Xenia tornado
  - Tornado outbreak of December 16, 2000
- Tornadoes of 2001
  - Tornado outbreak of April 10–11, 2001
  - 2001 Hoisington tornado
  - Tornado outbreak of June 18, 2001
  - Tornado outbreak of September 24, 2001
  - Tornado outbreak of November 23–24, 2001
  - Sydney to Hobart Yacht Race waterspout
- Tornadoes of 2002
  - Tornado outbreak of April 27–28, 2002
    - 2002 La Plata tornado
  - Tornado outbreak of June 23, 2002
  - 2002 Veterans Day weekend tornado outbreak
    - 2002 Van Wert–Roselms tornado
- Tornadoes of 2003
  - List of United States tornadoes from January to April 2003
  - Tornado outbreak sequence of May 3–11, 2003
    - List of tornadoes in the outbreak sequence of May 3–11, 2003
  - 2003 Bendigo tornado
  - 2003 South Dakota tornado outbreak
    - 2003 Manchester tornado
- Tornadoes of 2004
  - Tornado outbreak of April 20, 2004
  - Tornado outbreak sequence of May 2004
    - List of tornadoes in the May 2004 tornado outbreak sequence
      - 2004 Hallam tornado
  - 2004 Roanoke tornado
  - Hurricane Frances tornado outbreak
  - Hurricane Ivan tornado outbreak
  - Tornado outbreak of November 22–24, 2004
- Tornadoes of 2005
  - 2005 Indaiatuba tornado
  - Hurricane Cindy tornado outbreak
  - 2005 Birmingham tornado
  - Wisconsin tornado outbreak of 2005
  - Southern Ontario tornado outbreak of 2005
  - Hurricane Katrina tornado outbreak
  - Hurricane Rita tornado outbreak
  - Evansville tornado outbreak of November 2005
  - 2005 Iowa tornado outbreak
  - Tornado outbreak of November 15, 2005
  - Tornado outbreak of November 27–28, 2005
- Tornadoes of 2006
  - Tornado outbreak of January 2, 2006
  - Tornado outbreak sequence of March 9–13, 2006
  - Tornado outbreak of April 2, 2006
  - Tornado outbreak of April 6–8, 2006
    - List of tornadoes in the outbreak of April 6–8, 2006
  - Easter Week 2006 tornado outbreak sequence
  - Heat wave of 2006 derecho series
  - Tornado outbreak of August 24, 2006
  - Tornado outbreak of September 21–23, 2006
  - Tornado outbreak of November 14–16, 2006
  - Early Winter 2006 North American storm complex
  - 2006 London tornado
- Tornadoes of 2007
  - List of United States tornadoes from January to February 2007
    - 2007 Groundhog Day tornado outbreak
    - February 2007 North American blizzard
    - Tornado outbreak of February 28 – March 2, 2007
  - List of United States tornadoes in March 2007
    - Tornado outbreak of March 28–31, 2007
  - List of United States tornadoes in April 2007
    - April 2007 nor'easter
    - Tornado outbreak sequence of April 20–27, 2007
  - List of United States tornadoes in May 2007
    - Tornado outbreak of May 4–6, 2007
      - List of tornadoes in the outbreak of May 4–6, 2007
        - Greensburg tornado
  - List of United States tornadoes from June to July 2007
  - 2007 Southern Manitoba tornado outbreak
    - 2007 Elie tornado
  - List of United States tornadoes from August to September 2007
    - 2007 Brooklyn tornado
  - List of United States tornadoes from October to December 2007
    - Tornado outbreak of October 17–19, 2007
    - Mid-December 2007 North American winter storms
- Tornadoes of 2008
  - List of United States tornadoes from January to February 2008
    - Tornado outbreak sequence of January 7–11, 2008
    - 2008 Super Tuesday tornado outbreak
      - List of tornadoes in the 2008 Super Tuesday tornado outbreak
        - 2008 Atkins–Clinton tornado
        - 2008 Union University tornado
    - 2008 Prattville–Millbrook tornado
  - List of United States tornadoes from March to April 2008
    - North American blizzard of 2008
    - Tornado outbreak of March 14–15, 2008
      - 2008 Atlanta tornado
  - List of United States tornadoes in May 2008
    - Tornado outbreak of May 1–3, 2008
    - Tornado outbreak sequence of May 7–11, 2008
      - List of tornadoes in the outbreak sequence of May 7–11, 2008
        - 2008 Picher–Neosho tornado
    - Tornado outbreak of May 22–27, 2008
      - List of tornadoes in the outbreak of May 22–27, 2008
        - 2008 Parkersburg–New Hartford tornado
  - Tornado outbreak sequence of June 3–11, 2008
    - List of tornadoes in the outbreak sequence of June 3–11, 2008
  - August 2008 European tornado outbreak
  - 2008 Poland tornado outbreak
  - 2008 Tropical Storm Fay tornado outbreak
  - List of 2008 Minnesota tornadoes
- Tornadoes of 2009
  - Lists of United States tornadoes in 2009
    - List of United States tornadoes from January to March 2009
      - February 2009 North American storm complex
        - 2009 Lone Grove tornado
      - March 2009 tornado outbreak sequence
    - List of United States tornadoes in April 2009
      - Tornado outbreak of April 9–11, 2009
    - List of United States tornadoes in May 2009
      - Severe weather sequence of May 2–8, 2009
      - 2009 Super Derecho
    - List of United States tornadoes in June 2009
      - 2009 Goshen County tornado
    - List of United States tornadoes from July to August 2009
    - List of United States tornadoes from September to October 2009
    - List of United States tornadoes from November to December 2009
      - 2009 North American Christmas blizzard
    - 2009 Minnesota tornadoes
  - 2009 Krasnozavodsk tornado
  - 2009 Southern Ontario tornado outbreak

==== 2010s ====
- Tornadoes of 2010
  - List of United States tornadoes from January to March 2010
    - January 2010 North American winter storms
    - Tornado outbreak of March 28–29, 2010
  - List of United States tornadoes in April 2010
    - Tornado outbreak of April 22–25, 2010
      - List of tornadoes in the outbreak of April 22–25, 2010
        - 2010 Yazoo City tornado
    - Tornado outbreak of April 30 – May 2, 2010
  - List of United States tornadoes in May 2010
    - Tornado outbreak of May 10–13, 2010
      - List of tornadoes in the outbreak of May 10–13, 2010
    - Tornado outbreak of May 22–25, 2010
  - List of United States tornadoes in June 2010
    - Tornado outbreak of June 5–6, 2010
      - 2010 Millbury tornado
    - Tornado outbreak and derecho of June 16–18, 2010
      - 2010 Wadena tornado
      - 2010 Conger–Albert Lea tornado
    - 2010 Billings tornado
  - List of United States tornadoes in July 2010
    - 2010 Bronx tornado
  - List of United States tornadoes from August to September 2010
    - 2010 Brooklyn–Queens tornadoes
  - List of United States tornadoes in October 2010
    - October 2010 Arizona tornado outbreak and hailstorm
    - October 2010 North American storm complex
  - List of United States tornadoes from November to December 2010
    - 2010 New Year's Eve tornado outbreak
  - List of European tornadoes in 2010
- Tornadoes of 2011
  - List of United States tornadoes from January to March 2011
    - 2010 New Year's Eve tornado outbreak
  - List of United States tornadoes in April 2011
    - Tornado outbreak and derecho of April 4–5, 2011
    - Tornado outbreak of April 9–11, 2011
    - Tornado outbreak of April 14–16, 2011
      - List of tornadoes in the outbreak of April 14–16, 2011
        - 2011 Sanford–Raleigh tornado
    - Tornado outbreak and derecho of April 19–22, 2011
      - 2011 St. Louis tornado
    - 2011 Super Outbreak
      - List of tornadoes in the 2011 Super Outbreak
        - 2011 Philadelphia, Mississippi tornado
        - 2011 Cullman–Arab tornado
        - 2011 Hackleburg–Phil Campbell tornado
        - 2011 Cordova–Blountsville tornado
        - 2011 Smithville tornado
        - 2011 Flat Rock–Trenton tornado
        - 2011 Tuscaloosa–Birmingham tornado
        - 2011 Sawyerville–Eoline tornado
        - 2011 Enterprise tornado
        - 2011 Rainsville tornado
        - 2011 Shoal Creek Valley–Ohatchee tornado
        - 2011 Ringgold–Apison tornado
  - List of United States tornadoes in May 2011
    - Tornado outbreak sequence of May 21–26, 2011
      - List of tornadoes in the outbreak sequence of May 21–26, 2011
        - 2011 Reading tornado
        - Joplin tornado
        - 2011 El Reno–Piedmont tornado
        - 2011 Chickasha–Blanchard tornado
        - 2011 Washington–Goldsby tornado
  - List of United States tornadoes in June 2011
    - 2011 Springfield tornado
    - Tornado outbreak of June 18–22, 2011
  - List of United States tornadoes from July to August 2011
    - July 2011 Midwest derecho
    - 2011 Goderich tornado
  - List of United States tornadoes from September to October 2011
  - List of United States tornadoes from November to December 2011
  - List of European tornadoes in 2011
- Tornadoes of 2012
  - List of United States tornadoes from January to February 2012
    - 2012 Center Point–Clay tornado
    - 2012 Leap Day tornado outbreak
      - 2012 Branson tornado
  - List of United States tornadoes in March 2012
    - Tornado outbreak of March 2–3, 2012
      - 2012 Henryville tornado
      - 2012 Crittenden–Piner tornado
      - 2012 West Liberty tornado
      - 2012 East Bernstadt tornado
    - 2012 Dexter tornado
    - Tornado outbreak sequence of March 18–24, 2012
  - List of United States tornadoes in April 2012
    - Tornado outbreak of April 3, 2012
    - Tornado outbreak of April 13–16, 2012
      - 2012 Woodward tornado
  - 2012 Buenos Aires tornadoes
  - List of United States tornadoes from May to June 2012
    - 2012 Tropical Storm Debby tornado outbreak
  - List of United States tornadoes from July to September 2012
    - 2012 Hurricane Isaac tornado outbreak
  - List of United States tornadoes from October to December 2012
    - Late December 2012 North American storm complex
  - List of European tornadoes in 2012
- Tornadoes of 2013
  - List of United States tornadoes from January to February 2013
    - Tornado outbreak of January 29–30, 2013
    - 2013 Hattiesburg tornado
  - List of United States tornadoes from March to April 2013
    - 2013 Shuqualak tornado
  - 2013 Brahmanbaria tornado
  - List of United States tornadoes in May 2013
    - Tornado outbreak of May 15–17, 2013
      - 2013 Granbury tornado
    - Tornado outbreak of May 18–21, 2013
      - List of tornadoes in the outbreak of May 18–21, 2013
        - 2013 Moore tornado
    - Tornado outbreak of May 26–31, 2013
      - List of tornadoes in the outbreak of May 26–31, 2013
        - 2013 El Reno tornado
  - List of United States tornadoes from June to July 2013
    - June 12–13, 2013 derecho series
  - List of United States tornadoes from August to October 2013
    - October 2013 North American storm complex
      - 2013 Wayne tornado
  - List of United States tornadoes from November to December 2013
    - Tornado outbreak of November 17, 2013
      - 2013 Washington, Illinois tornado
    - December 2013 North American storm complex
  - List of European tornadoes in 2013
- Tornadoes of 2014
  - List of United States tornadoes from January to March 2014
  - List of United States tornadoes from April to May 2014
    - North Carolina tornado outbreak of April 2014
    - Tornado outbreak and floods of April 27–30, 2014
      - List of tornadoes in the outbreak and floods of April 27–30, 2014
        - 2014 Mayflower–Vilonia tornado
        - 2014 Louisville, Mississippi tornado
    - Tornado outbreak of May 10–12, 2014
  - List of United States tornadoes from June to July 2014
    - Tornado outbreak of June 16–18, 2014
      - 2014 Pilger tornado family
  - List of United States tornadoes from August to September 2014
  - List of United States tornadoes from October to December 2014
    - December 2014 North American storm complex
  - List of European tornadoes in 2014
    - 2014 Pentecost weekend storms in Europe
  - Peninsular Malaysia tornado outbreak of 2014
- Tornadoes of 2015
  - List of United States tornadoes from January to March 2015
  - List of United States tornadoes in April 2015
    - Tornado outbreak of April 8–9, 2015
      - 2015 Rochelle–Fairdale tornado
  - 2015 Pakistan tornado
  - List of United States tornadoes in May 2015
    - Tornado outbreak sequence of May 5–10, 2015
    - Tornado outbreak and floods of May 23–26, 2015
  - List of United States tornadoes from June to August 2015
  - List of United States tornadoes from September to October 2015
  - List of United States tornadoes from November to December 2015
    - Tornado outbreak of November 16–18, 2015
    - Tornado outbreak of December 23–25, 2015
      - 2015 Holly Springs–Ashland tornado
    - December 2015 North American storm complex
      - 2015 Garland–Rowlett tornado
- Tornadoes of 2016
  - List of United States tornadoes from January to March 2016
    - January 2016 United States blizzard
    - February 2016 North American winter storm
    - Tornado outbreak of February 23–24, 2016
  - List of United States tornadoes from April to May 2016
    - Tornado outbreak of May 7–10, 2016
      - 2016 Katie–Wynnewood tornado
    - Tornado outbreak sequence of May 22–26, 2016
      - 2016 Abilene–Chapman tornado
  - List of United States tornadoes from June to August 2016
    - Tornado outbreak of August 24, 2016
  - 2016 Funing tornado
  - List of United States tornadoes from September to December 2016
    - Manzanita tornado
    - Tornado outbreak of November 27–30, 2016
- Tornadoes of 2017
  - List of United States tornadoes from January to March 2017
    - January 2017 North American ice storm
    - Tornado outbreak of January 21–23, 2017
      - 2017 Albany tornado
    - Tornado outbreak of February 7, 2017
    - Tornado outbreak of February 28 – March 1, 2017
      - 2017 Perryville tornado
    - Tornado outbreak of March 6–7, 2017
  - List of United States tornadoes in April 2017
    - Tornado outbreak of April 2–3, 2017
    - Tornado outbreak and floods of April 28 – May 1, 2017
  - List of United States tornadoes in May 2017
    - Tornado outbreak sequence of May 15–20, 2017
  - List of United States tornadoes from June to July 2017
  - List of United States tornadoes from August to October 2017
    - 2017 Tulsa tornadoes
  - List of United States tornadoes from November to December 2017
- Tornadoes of 2018
  - List of United States tornadoes from January to March 2018
    - March 20–22, 2018 nor'easter
  - List of United States tornadoes in April 2018
    - April 2018 North American storm complex
  - List of United States tornadoes in May 2018
  - 2018 South America tornado outbreak
  - List of United States tornadoes from June to July 2018
    - 2018 Iowa tornado outbreak
    - Carr Fire tornado
  - List of United States tornadoes from August to October 2018
    - 2018 United States–Canada tornado outbreak
  - List of United States tornadoes from November to December 2018
    - Tornado outbreak of November 30 – December 2, 2018
    - 2018 Port Orchard tornado
- Tornadoes of 2019
  - 2019 Havana tornado
  - List of United States tornadoes from January to March 2019
    - 2019 Columbus, Mississippi, tornado
    - Tornado outbreak of March 3, 2019
      - 2019 Beauregard tornado
  - March 2019 North American blizzard
  - 2019 Bara–Parsa tornado
  - List of United States tornadoes in April 2019
    - Tornado outbreak of April 13–15, 2019
    - Tornado outbreak of April 17–19, 2019
    - 2019 Ruston tornado
  - List of United States tornadoes in May 2019
    - Tornado outbreak of May 17–18, 2019
    - Tornado outbreak of May 20–23, 2019
      - List of tornadoes in the outbreak of May 20–23, 2019
    - Tornado outbreak of May 25–30, 2019
      - List of tornadoes in the outbreak of May 25–30, 2019
        - 2019 Dayton tornado
        - 2019 Linwood tornado
  - List of United States tornadoes from June to August 2019
  - List of United States tornadoes from September to October 2019
    - Tornado outbreak of October 20–22, 2019
      - 2019 North Dallas tornado
  - List of United States tornadoes from November to December 2019
    - November 26 – December 3, 2019 North American blizzard
    - Tornado outbreak of December 16–17, 2019

==== 2020s ====
- Tornadoes of 2020
  - List of United States tornadoes from January to March 2020
    - Tornado outbreak of January 10–11, 2020
    - Tornado outbreak of February 5–7, 2020
    - Tornado outbreak of March 2–3, 2020
      - 2020 Nashville tornado
      - 2020 Cookeville tornado
    - 2020 Jonesboro tornado
  - List of United States tornadoes in April 2020
    - 2020 Easter tornado outbreak
      - List of tornadoes in the 2020 Easter tornado outbreak
        - 2020 Monroe tornado
        - 2020 Bassfield–Soso tornado
        - 2020 Hampton County tornado
    - Tornado outbreak of April 19–20, 2020
    - Tornado outbreak of April 21–23, 2020
  - List of United States tornadoes from May to July 2020
    - 2020 Ashby–Dalton tornado
  - List of United States tornadoes from August to September 2020
    - Hurricane Isaias tornado outbreak
    - 2020 Midwest derecho
    - Loyalton Fire fire tornadoes
  - List of United States tornadoes from October to December 2020
    - November 2020 North American storm complex
    - Tornado outbreak of December 16, 2020
- Tornadoes of 2021
  - List of European tornadoes in 2021
    - 2021 South Moravia tornado
    - European tornado outbreak of August 2, 2021
  - List of United States tornadoes in 2021
    - List of United States tornadoes from January to March 2021
      - 2021 Fultondale tornado
      - Tornado outbreak of February 15, 2021
      - Tornado outbreak of March 13, 2021
      - Tornado outbreak of March 16–18, 2021
      - Tornado outbreak sequence of March 24–28, 2021
    - List of United States tornadoes from April to June 2021
      - Tornado outbreak of May 2–4, 2021
      - 2021 Naperville–Woodridge tornado
    - List of United States tornadoes from July to September 2021
      - Tornado outbreak of July 28–29, 2021
      - 2021 Boscobel tornado
      - Tropical Storm Fred tornado outbreak
      - Hurricane Ida tornado outbreak
    - List of United States tornadoes from October to November 2021
    - List of United States tornadoes in December 2021
      - Tornado outbreak of December 10–11, 2021
        - List of tornadoes in the outbreak of December 10–11, 2021
          - 2021 Monette–Samburg tornado
          - Edwardsville Amazon warehouse collapse
          - 2021 Western Kentucky tornado
          - 2021 Bowling Green tornadoes
      - Tornado outbreak and derecho of December 15–16, 2021
- Tornadoes of 2022
  - List of European tornadoes in 2022
    - Storm Dudley tornado outbreak
    - 2022 Russia–Ukraine tornado outbreak
    - October 2022 European tornado outbreak
  - List of United States tornadoes in 2022
    - List of United States tornadoes from January to March 2022
      - Tornado outbreak of January 16, 2022
      - Tornado outbreak of February 3, 2022
      - Tornado outbreak of March 5–7, 2022
        - Winterset tornado
      - Tornado outbreak of March 21–23, 2022
      - Tornado outbreak of March 29–31, 2022
    - List of United States tornadoes in April 2022
      - Tornado outbreak of April 4–7, 2022
        - 2022 Pembroke–Black Creek tornado
      - April 2022 North American storm complex
      - 2022 Andover tornado
    - List of United States tornadoes from May to June 2022
      - May 2022 Midwest derecho
      - 2022 Gaylord tornado
      - May 2022 Canadian derecho
      - June 2022 Chicago supercell
    - List of United States tornadoes from July to October 2022
      - Hurricane Ian tornado outbreak
    - List of United States tornadoes from November to December 2022
      - Tornado outbreak of November 4–5, 2022
      - Tornado outbreak of December 12–15, 2022
- Tornadoes of 2023
  - List of Canadian tornadoes in 2023
  - List of European tornadoes in 2023
    - 2023 Northern Italy storms
    - Storm Ciarán tornado outbreak
    - 2023 Jersey tornado
  - 2023 Aung Myin Kone–Tada U tornado
  - List of United States tornadoes in 2023
    - List of United States tornadoes from January to February 2023
      - Tornado outbreak of January 12, 2023
        - 2023 Selma tornado
        - 2023 Old Kingston–Lake Martin tornado
      - 2023 Pasadena–Deer Park tornado
      - February 2023 North American storm complex
    - List of United States tornadoes in March 2023
      - Early-March 2023 North American storm complex
      - Tornado outbreak of March 24–27, 2023
        - 2023 Rolling Fork tornado
        - 2023 Black Hawk–Winona tornado
        - 2023 Amory tornado
      - Tornado outbreak of March 31 – April 1, 2023
        - List of tornadoes in the outbreak of March 31 – April 1, 2023
          - 2023 Little Rock tornado
          - 2023 Wynne–Parkin tornado
          - Belvidere Apollo Theatre collapse
          - 2023 Robinson–Sullivan tornado
          - 2023 Bethel Springs–Adamsville tornado
    - List of United States tornadoes from April to May 2023
      - 2023 Virginia Beach tornado
    - List of United States tornadoes in June 2023
      - Tornado outbreak sequence of June 14–19, 2023
        - 2023 Perryton tornado
      - Tornado outbreak sequence of June 20–26, 2023
    - List of United States tornadoes from July to August 2023
      - Tornado outbreak sequence of August 4–8, 2023
    - List of United States tornadoes from September to December 2023
      - December 2023 Tennessee tornado outbreak
        - 2023 Clarksville tornado
        - 2023 Hendersonville tornado
- Tornadoes of 2024
  - List of European tornadoes in 2024
    - 2024 Šiauliai tornado
  - List of United States tornadoes in 2024
    - List of United States tornadoes from January to March 2024
      - January 8–10, 2024 North American storm complex
      - Tornado outbreak of March 13–15, 2024
        - 2024 Lakeview–Russells Point tornado
    - List of United States tornadoes in April 2024
      - Tornado outbreak and derecho of April 1–3, 2024
      - Tornado outbreak of April 25–28, 2024
        - List of tornadoes in the outbreak of April 25–28, 2024
          - 2024 Elkhorn tornado
          - 2024 Minden–Harlan tornado
          - 2024 Sulphur tornado
      - 2024 Westmoreland tornado
    - List of United States tornadoes in May 2024
      - Tornado outbreak of May 6–10, 2024
        - List of tornadoes in the outbreak of May 6–10, 2024
          - 2024 Barnsdall tornado
          - 2024 Tallahassee tornadoes
      - 2024 Houston derecho
      - Tornado outbreak of May 19–22, 2024
        - Greenfield tornado
      - Tornado outbreak of May 25–27, 2024
        - 2024 Valley View tornado
    - List of United States tornadoes from June to July 2024
      - Hurricane Beryl tornado outbreak
      - Severe weather sequence of July 13–16, 2024
    - List of United States tornadoes from August to October 2024
      - Hurricane Milton tornado outbreak
    - List of United States tornadoes from November to December 2024
      - Tornado outbreak of November 2–5, 2024
      - Tornado outbreak of December 28–29, 2024
- Tornadoes of 2025
  - List of Canadian tornadoes in 2025
  - List of European tornadoes in 2025
  - List of United States tornadoes from January to March 2025
    - January 5–6, 2025 United States blizzard
    - February 2025 North American storm complex
    - Early March 2025 North American blizzard
    - Tornado outbreak of March 14–16, 2025
      - List of tornadoes in the outbreak of March 14–16, 2025
        - 2025 Fifty-Six–Larkin tornado
        - 2025 Cushman–Cave City tornado
        - 2025 Kentwood–Carson tornado
    - Mid-March 2025 North American blizzard
  - List of United States tornadoes in April 2025
    - Tornado outbreak and floods of April 2–7, 2025
      - List of tornadoes in the outbreak and floods of April 2–7, 2025
  - List of United States tornadoes in May 2025
    - Tornado outbreak of May 15–16, 2025
      - List of tornadoes in the outbreak of May 15–16, 2025
        - 2025 St. Louis tornado
        - 2025 Marion, Illinois tornado
        - 2025 Somerset–London tornado
    - Tornado outbreak of May 18–21, 2025
      - List of tornadoes in the outbreak of May 18–21, 2025
        - 2025 South Kansas tornado family
  - List of United States tornadoes from June to July 2025
    - Tornado outbreak and derecho of June 19–22, 2025
      - 2025 Enderlin tornado
    - 2025 La Sal fire tornado
  - List of United States tornadoes from August to December 2025
  - 2025 Southern Brazil tornado outbreak
    - 2025 Rio Bonito do Iguaçu tornado
- Tornadoes of 2026
  - List of United States tornadoes from January to March 2026
    - Tornado outbreak of March 5–7, 2026
      - 2026 Union City tornado
    - Tornado outbreak of March 10–12, 2026
  - List of United States tornadoes in April 2026
    - Tornado outbreak of April 17–18, 2026
    - Tornado outbreak sequence of April 23–28, 2026
  - List of United States tornadoes from May to June 2026
    - Tornado outbreak and derecho of June 9–11, 2026
    - Tornado outbreak and derecho of June 21–22, 2026
  - List of United States tornadoes from July to August 2026
  - 2026 Turkey tornado outbreak

== Research on tornadoes ==
- History of tornado research
  - Northern Tornadoes Project
  - VORTEX projects
  - SRV Dominator
  - TWISTEX
  - Tornado Intercept Vehicle (TIV)
  - TOtable Tornado Observatory (TOTO)
  - List of case studies on tornadoes (2020–present)
  - List of tornadic researchers
    - Jim Cantore
    - Ted Fujita
    - Thomas P. Grazulis
    - David K. Hoadley
    - Timothy P. Marshall
    - Tim Samaras
    - Reed Timmer

=== Radars ===
- NEXRAD (WSR-88D), the US government's network of 159 Doppler radars
- Joint Polarization Experiment
- NSSL Doppler
- CSU-CHILL
- Advanced Technology Demonstrator
- OU-PRIME
- ARMOR Doppler Weather Radar
- Aggie Doppler Radar
- Terminal Doppler Weather Radar (TDWR)
- WSR-1
- WSR-57
- WSR-74
- Mobile radars
  - Doppler on Wheels
  - RaXPol
  - SMART-R
  - Mobile radar observation of tornadoes

== In films, media, and entertainment ==
- Cultural significance of tornadoes

=== Films ===
- The Wizard of Oz (1939 film)
- Tornado (1943 film)
- Twister (1989 film), a comedy film starring Suzy Amis Cameron and Crispin Glover
- Night of the Twisters (1996 film)
- Tornado! (1996 film)
- Twister (1996 film), a disaster film starring Helen Hunt and Bill Paxton
- Atomic Twister (2001 film)
- The Day After Tomorrow (2004 film)
- Category 7: The End of the World (2005 film)
- Tornado Glory (2006 film)
- NYC: Tornado Terror (2008 film)
- Into the Storm (2014 film)
- 13 Minutes (2021 film)
- Supercell (2023 film)
- Twisters (2024 film), the 2024 sequel to the 1996 film starring Daisy Edgar-Jones and Glen Powell

=== Paintings ===
- Tornado over Kansas (1929)
- Tragic Prelude (1942)

=== Periodicals ===
- Storm Data
- Storm Track

=== Photographs ===
- Massive double-funnel tornado near Dunlap, Indiana (1965)
- Cobb family staggering out of Briarwood Elementary School (2013)
