= Project NIMROD =

Field study of severe thunderstorms and severe winds

NIMROD
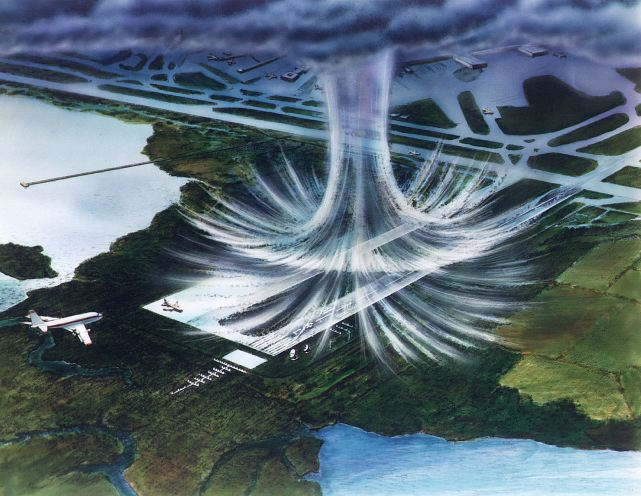
- Danger to aviation by microbursts.
- Date: May 15–June 30, 1978
- Location: Greater Chicago
- Also known as: Northern Illinois Meteorological Research On Downburst
- Participants: National Center for Atmospheric Research and University of Chicago under the direction of Ted Fujita and Ramesh Srivastava
- Outcome: Documented downbursts, microbursts and other severe wind events with thunderstorms.

Project NIMROD (Northern Illinois Meteorological Research On Downburst) was a meteorological field study of severe thunderstorms and their damaging winds conducted by the National Center for Atmospheric Research (NCAR). It took place in the Greater Chicago area from May 15 to June 30, 1978. Data collected was from single cell thunderstorms as well as mesoscale convective systems, such as bow echoes. Using Doppler weather radars and damage clues on the ground, the team studied mesocyclones, downbursts and gust fronts. NIMROD was the first time that microbursts, very localized strong downdrafts under thunderstorms, were detected; this helped improve airport and public safety by the development of systems like the Terminal Doppler Weather Radar and the Low-level windshear alert system.

== Description ==
The project was set up by Ted Fujita and Ramesh Srivastava from the University of Chicago, with research assistants from the university Roger Wakimoto and Gregory S. Forbes helping, along with researcher Jim Wilson from NCAR. The network was composed of 3 Doppler weather radars (2 C-band radars, 1 CP-3 and 1 CP-4, along with a CHILL S-band radar) disposed in a triangular baseline approximately 37 mi (60 km) from one another, and 27 Portable Automated Mesonets (PAMs) from NCAR forming a mesonet in and around the Chicago area.

O'Hare International Airport was intentionally part of the location used for the project, so that the low-level winds of the area could be measured near a large airport. The location was also chosen to include corn crops, as a way to measure wind, and the study was performed in late spring so the corn would be in its growing season. The nominal height of the PAMs were 13 ft (4 m); they were placed in both suburban areas and fields. Operations were made from the site of the CP-3 radar, where roughly 200 rawinsondes every 30–60 minutes upon request. Field offices of the National Weather Service informed the project on "significant" tornadoes and downbursts, and helped complete damage surveys.

== Aim and results ==
Bow echoes are associated with different types of severe winds.

Not many studies had been conducted on downdrafts from thunderstorms before this one, and the extension of their effects was not well known. Fujita suspected that localized downdrafts, later called microbursts, were responsible for damage on the ground and were involved in some airplane crashes, such as the June 24, 1975 Eastern Air Lines Flight 66, which crashed during landing at New York's John F. Kennedy International Airport, killing 113 and injuring the other 11 on board.

Fujita had hypothesized during the inquiry that the cause was a sudden burst of air coming down from a thunderstorm from his previous study of the effects of the damage caused by the atomic bomb dropped on Nagasaki in August 1945, and some unexplained damage during the 1974 Super Outbreak of tornadoes. However, there was strong resistance from the meteorological community. He convinced the National Science Foundation and NCAR to fund projects to study thunderstorm downdrafts. NIMROD was the first large scale experiment to study this phenomenon. and it was the first time that Fujita had used Doppler radar data; he had no previous experience in the interpretation of their data, but quickly became comfortable with them.

Shortly after the start of the field program, the first recorded microburst on Doppler weather radar was viewed on the CP-3 radar at Yorkville, Illinois, on May 29, 1978. On the first scan of a thunderstorm, the Doppler velocity display showed a doublet of inbound-outbound velocities which was followed by observation of a gust front. Data obtained during the whole project permitted to describe the three-dimensional motion of the air in thunderstorms and their structure as different types of systems, such as single cells, multi-cells, and bow echoes, but including others as well.

== Legacy ==
This first experiment has been followed by numerous others since 1978. Some of these include the JAWS (Joint Airport and Weather Studies) in 1982, the MIST (Microburst and Severe Thunderstorm Experiment) in 1986 led by Fujita, and the VORTEX projects. All of them have led to a better understanding of severe weather during the summer, leading to better airport and public safety.

== Bibliography ==
- Fujita, T. T. (1978). Manual of downburst identification for project Nimrod (PDF). Satellite and Mesometeorology Research Paper. Vol. 156. Dept. of Geophysical Sciences, University of Chicago. Archived from the original (PDF) on 2017-02-19.
- Fujita, T. T. (1978). Objective, operation, and results of Project NIMROD. 11th Conf. on Severe Local Storms. Kansas City, MO: Amer. Meteor. Soc. pp. 259–266..
