= Tornado outbreak of May 2, 1942 =

Severe weather event in the United States

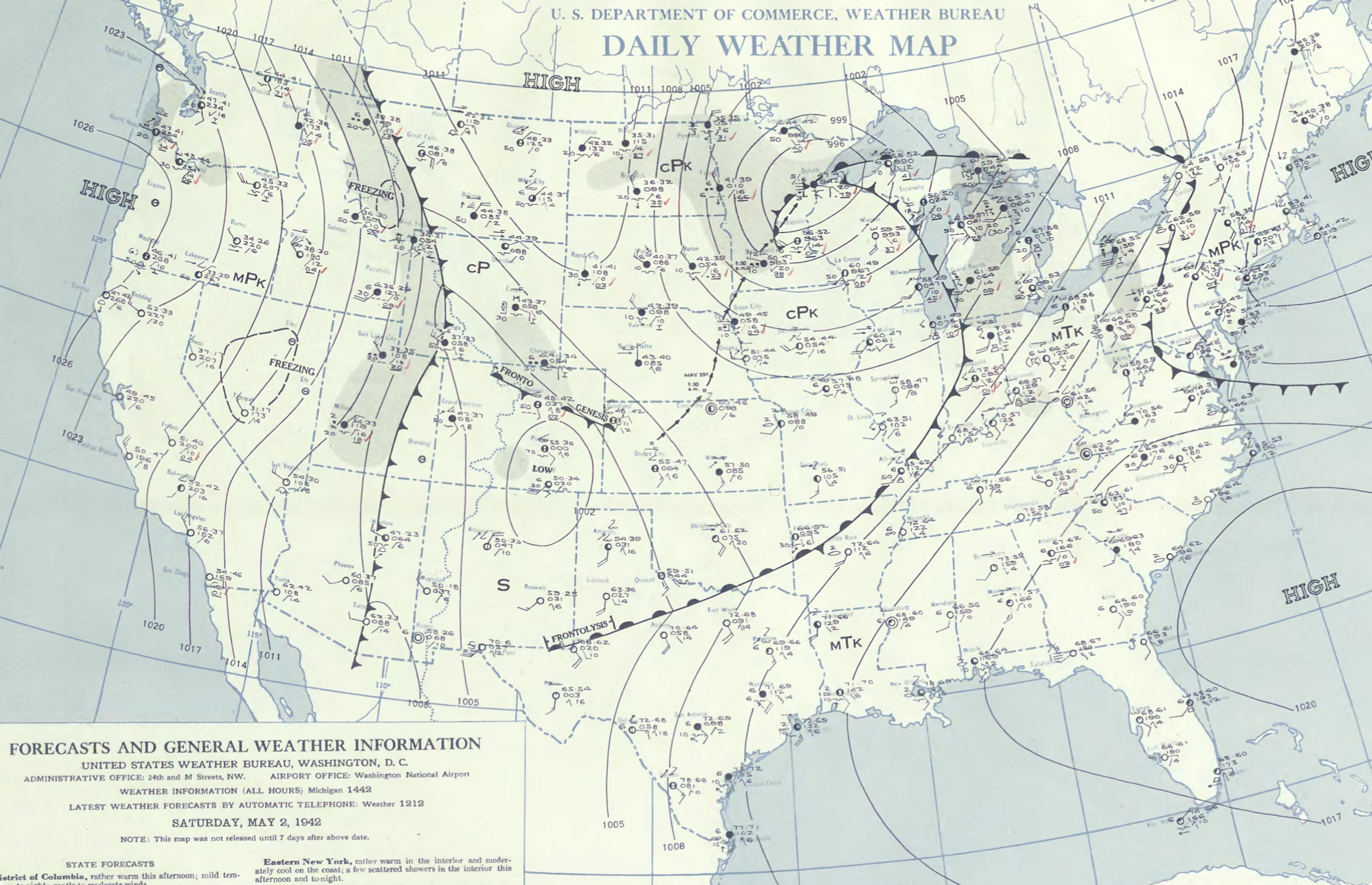
- Surface weather analysis on May 2, showing weather patterns during the tornado outbreak

Tornado outbreak
- Tornadoes: ≥ 8
- Max. rating: F4 tornado
- Duration: May 2, 1942

Overall effects
- Fatalities: 31
- Injuries: ≥ 172
- Damage: $1,095,000 ($21,580,000 in 2025 USD) (Note: All losses are in 1942 USD unless otherwise noted.)
- Areas affected: Central United States
- Part of the tornadoes and tornado outbreaks of 1942

On May 2, 1942, a deadly tornado outbreak affected portions of the Central United States, particularly Northeastern Oklahoma and Southeast Kansas. In the latter areas the severe weather event produced at least four violent, long-tracked tornado families, retroactively assessed as having inflicted F4 damage, that varied in length from 55 to 88 mi (89 to 142 km). Altogether these claimed 29 lives and injured at least 158 people, featuring six known tornadoes, all rated F4. Besides these, the outbreak also yielded two other tornadoes, both deadly: a long-lived F3 family in Illinois that killed one person and an F2 in Missouri that killed one more. The entire outbreak killed 31 people and injured at least 172. (Note: An outbreak is generally defined as a group of at least six tornadoes (the number sometimes varies slightly according to local climatology) with no more than a six-hour gap between individual tornadoes. An outbreak sequence, prior to (after) the start of modern records in 1950, is defined as a period of no more than two (one) consecutive days without at least one significant (F2 or stronger) tornado.)

== Confirmed tornadoes ==
Confirmed tornadoes by Fujita rating
FU	F0	F1	F2	F3	F4	F5	Total
?	?	?	1	1	6	0	≥ 8

Prior to 1990, there is a likely undercount of tornadoes, particularly E/F0–1, with reports of weaker tornadoes becoming more common as population increased. A sharp increase in the annual average E/F0–1 count by approximately 200 tornadoes was noted upon the implementation of NEXRAD Doppler weather radar in 1990–1991. (Note: Historically, the number of tornadoes globally and in the United States was and is likely underrepresented: research by Grazulis on annual tornado activity suggests that, as of 2001, only 53% of yearly U.S. tornadoes were officially recorded. Documentation of tornadoes outside the United States was historically less exhaustive, owing to the lack of monitors in many nations and, in some cases, to internal political controls on public information. Most countries only recorded tornadoes that produced severe damage or loss of life. Significant low biases in U.S. tornado counts likely occurred through the early 1990s, when advanced NEXRAD was first installed and the National Weather Service began comprehensively verifying tornado occurrences.) 1974 marked the first year where significant tornado (E/F2+) counts became homogenous with contemporary values, attributed to the consistent implementation of Fujita scale assessments. (Note: The Fujita scale was devised under the aegis of scientist T. Theodore Fujita in the early 1970s. Prior to the advent of the scale in 1971, tornadoes in the United States were officially unrated. Tornado ratings were retroactively applied to events prior to the formal adoption of the F-scale by the National Weather Service. While the Fujita scale has been superseded by the Enhanced Fujita scale in the U.S. since February 1, 2007, Canada used the old scale until April 1, 2013; nations elsewhere, like the United Kingdom, apply other classifications such as the TORRO scale.) Numerous discrepancies on the details of tornadoes in this outbreak exist between sources. The total count of tornadoes and ratings differs from various agencies accordingly. The list below documents information from the most contemporary official sources alongside assessments from tornado historian Thomas P. Grazulis.

=== May 2 event ===
Confirmed tornadoes – Saturday, May 2, 1942
F#	Location	County / Parish	State	Time (UTC) (Note: All dates are based on the local time zone where the tornado touched down; however, all times are in Coordinated Universal Time and dates are split at midnight CST/CDT for consistency.)	Path length	Width (Note: The listed width values are primarily the average/mean width of the tornadoes, with those having known maximum widths denoted by ♯. From 1952 to 1994, reports largely list mean width whereas contemporary years list maximum width. Values provided by Grazulis are the average width, with estimates being rounded down (i.e. 0.5 mi (0.80 km) is rounded down from 880 yards to 800 yards.)	Damage
F4	S of Morrison to Pawhuska to near South Coffeyville	Noble, Pawnee, Osage, Washington, Nowata	Oklahoma	20:30–?	85 mi (137 km)	1,760 yd (1,610 m)♯	$150,000
F4	3 deaths – This erratic, long-lived tornado family, up to 1 mi (1.6 km) wide, mostly hit remote areas, but did impact rural ranches, leveling structures and killing "hundreds" of cattle as it did so. Entering southeastern Pawhuska, it destroyed a 12-block swath of housing there, 30 homes in all. The death toll remained low, as most residents had sheltered in time. At least 28—possibly 32—injuries occurred. The path zigzagged, and damage often emerged on either side of the main event, indicating multiple tornadoes.						
F4	S of Cushing to N of Owasso	Payne, Creek, Tulsa, Osage	Oklahoma	21:15–?	55 mi (89 km)	880 yd (800 m)♯	$65,000
F4	7 deaths – This tornado family initially damaged little, tracking past Drumright, Olive, and Silver City. Passing northwest of Tulsa, it leveled some homes, along with many other structures, and felled trees. Four deaths occurred near Turley and three more north of Fisher. 20 people were injured. Secondary areas of damage were frequently noted, suggesting multiple tornadoes.						
F4	Near McLoud to N of Chilesville	Pottwatomie, Lincoln, Okfuskee, Creek	Oklahoma	21:30–?	55 mi (89 km)	1,232 yd (1,127 m)♯	$120,000
F4	16 deaths – This tornado family leveled small farmhouses in the Welty–Paden–Boley area, passing a short distance south of Prague. The severest damage occurred near Chilesville, where a "small farming community" was obliterated, resulting in a dozen deaths. In all 80 people were injured.						
F4	SW of Fredonia to Chanute	Wilson, Neosho	Kansas	21:30–?	30 mi (48 km)	300 yd (270 m)	$150,000
F4	1 death – This was the first of three tornadoes in an 88-mile-long (142 km) family, one or more of which were up to 0.9 mi (1.4 km) wide, that produced relatively little F4 damage. The first tornado struck about 35 farms, leveling four homes. 10 injuries occurred.						
F4	N of Iola to N of Lone Elm	Allen, Anderson	Kansas	22:00–?	11 mi (18 km)	400 yd (370 m)	$100,000
F4	The next member of the Fredonia family, this tornado produced F4 damage east of Colony, where it hit 24 barns and nine homes. 10 injuries occurred.						
F4	E of Humboldt to NW of Xenia	Allen, Bourbon, Linn	Kansas	22:20–?	35 mi (56 km)	200 yd (180 m)	$150,000
F4	2 deaths – This tornado, the final member of the Fredonia family, damaged 20 or more farmsteads. The deaths occurred near La Harpe and Mound City. 10 injuries occurred.						
F3	SW of Franklin to NW of Springfield to near Waynesville	Morgan, Sangamon, Logan, DeWitt	Illinois	01:00–?	70 mi (110 km)	300 yd (270 m)	≥ $360,000
F3	1 death – A long-tracked tornado family hit eastern Franklin, destroying or damaging 105 homes there, of which at least five incurred F3 damage. Debris from Franklin was lofted 4 mi (6.4 km). Parallel tornadoes may have caused damage in Logan County. 12 injuries occurred.						
F2	SE of Fayette	Howard	Missouri	02:10–?	Unknown	Unknown	Unknown
F2	1 death – A home was swept off its foundation. A woman inside was fatally crushed beneath a fallen chimney. Two people were injured.						

== Sources ==
- Agee, Ernest M.; Childs, Samuel (June 1, 2014). "Adjustments in Tornado Counts, F-Scale Intensity, and Path Width for Assessing Significant Tornado Destruction". Journal of Applied Meteorology and Climatology. 53 (6). American Meteorological Society: 1494–1505. Bibcode:2014JApMC..53.1494A. doi:10.1175/JAMC-D-13-0235.1.
- Brooks, Harold E. (April 2004). "On the Relationship of Tornado Path Length and Width to Intensity". Weather and Forecasting. 19 (2): 310–19. Bibcode:2004WtFor..19..310B. doi:10.1175/1520-0434(2004)019<0310:OTROTP>2.0.CO;2.
- Cook, A. R.; Schaefer, J. T. (August 2008). "The Relation of El Niño–Southern Oscillation (ENSO) to Winter Tornado Outbreaks". Monthly Weather Review. 136 (8): 3121–3137. Bibcode:2008MWRv..136.3121C. doi:10.1175/2007MWR2171.1.
- Edwards, Roger; LaDue, James G.; Ferree, John T.; Scharfenberg, Kevin; Maier, Chris; Coulbourne, William L. (May 1, 2013). "Tornado Intensity Estimation: Past, Present, and Future". Bulletin of the American Meteorological Society. 94 (5). American Meteorological Society: 641–653. Bibcode:2013BAMS...94..641E. doi:10.1175/BAMS-D-11-00006.1.
- Grazulis, Thomas P. (May 1984). Violent Tornado Climatography, 1880–1982. OSTI (Technical report). NUREG. Washington, D.C.: Nuclear Regulatory Commission. OSTI 7099491. CR-3670.
  - — (November 1990). Significant Tornadoes 1880–1989. Vol. 2. St. Johnsbury, Vermont: The Tornado Project of Environmental Films. ISBN 1-879362-02-3.
  - — (July 1993). Significant Tornadoes 1680–1991: A Chronology and Analysis of Events. St. Johnsbury, Vermont: The Tornado Project of Environmental Films. ISBN 1-879362-03-1.
  - — (2001a). The Tornado: Nature's Ultimate Windstorm. Norman: University of Oklahoma Press. ISBN 978-0-8061-3538-0.
  - — (2001b). F5-F6 Tornadoes. St. Johnsbury, Vermont: The Tornado Project of Environmental Films.
- Wahlgren, H. F. (May 1942). Written at Oklahoma City. "Tornadoes". Oklahoma section. Climatological Data. 51 (5). Washington, D.C.: United States Weather Bureau: 25–7.
- "Severe Local Storms, May 1942". Monthly Weather Review. 70 (5). Washington, D.C.: United States Weather Bureau: 111–2. May 1942. Bibcode:1942MWRv...70..111.. doi:10.1175/1520-0493(1942)070<0111:SLSM>2.0.CO;2 – via American Meteorological Society.
