= Greg Forbes (meteorologist) =

American meteorologist

- Born: August 22, 1950 (age 76); Latrobe, Pennsylvania, U.S.
- Education: Pennsylvania State University (BS); University of Chicago (MS; PhD)
- Known for: Tornado, downburst, and mesoscale meteorology research
- Scientific career
- Fields: Meteorology
- Workplaces: Pennsylvania State University; The Weather Channel
- Thesis: Three Scales of Motions Associated with Tornadoes (1978)
- Doctoral advisor: Ted Fujita

Gregory Stanley Forbes (born August 22, 1950) is The Weather Channel's long-time severe weather expert and has a significant research background in the areas of severe convective storms and tornadoes.

Born and raised near Latrobe, Pennsylvania, Forbes earned a B.S. degree in meteorology at Pennsylvania State University (PSU). He studied tornadoes and severe thunderstorms at the University of Chicago, where he obtained his M.S. and Ph.D. There, Forbes studied under tornado scientist Ted Fujita and his thesis was regarding the 1974 Super Outbreak where he and Fujita did aerial and ground investigations documenting tornado paths and furthering ideas of the tornado family and of multiple-vortex tornadoes. It was with those data he confirmed in a 1981 article that the hook echo is an excellent clue on a weather radar for the development of tornadoes.

Forbes served as field manager for the Project NIMROD, the first measurement program to study damaging thunderstorm winds from downbursts and microbursts. He then joined the faculty in the Department of Meteorology at Penn State in 1978, where he taught courses in weather analysis and forecasting, natural disasters, and other topics until joining The Weather Channel (TWC) in June 1999. Forbes has had a variety of experiences outside of the classroom, including surveying the damage paths left by about 300 tornadoes and windstorms, including Hurricane Andrew and Typhoon Paka. As part of his research at Penn State, he was lead weather forecaster for numerous field research programs around the country.

He continues limited research and was on the development team of the Enhanced Fujita Scale which in 2007 replaced the original Fujita Scale from 1971.

Forbes announced he would go into semi-retirement on July 6, 2018.

== Personal life ==
In May 2014, TWC president David Clark announced on Forbes' Facebook page that Forbes had colon cancer, but that his prognosis was good as the cancer is treatable and had not spread. Forbes and TWC subsequently released a PSA urging people to have regular checkups and, when necessary, cancer screenings. In December 2014, Forbes wrote on his Facebook page that his doctor found no traces of cancer in his body.

On January 12, 2017, The Weather Channel announced on its Facebook page that Forbes has decided to go from full-time to part-time status, due in part to his "colon cancer scare" three years earlier. He also pointed out that he had turned 66 the previous summer, and expressed a desire to travel "while my health is good."

On July 6, 2018, Dr. Greg Forbes announced his retirement from The Weather Channel; he would return the following spring in limited capacity before formally stepping down later in 2019.
