= Tornado outbreak of July 8–9, 1927 =

1927 tornado outbreak in the Interior Plains

- Clockwise from top: A photograph of a tornado approaching Vulcan, Alberta, on July 8; significant damage to a storefront following an unrated tornado in Rocky Mountain House, Alberta on July 8; a 1928 newspaper detailing Lucille Handberg's award-winning photographs of the Jasper, Minnesota tornado on July 8, 1927

Tornado outbreak
- Tornadoes: 17
- Max. rating: F1 tornado
- Duration: July 8–9, 1927
- Highest winds: Tornadic – 73–112 mph (117–180 km/h) (Jasper, Minnesota F1 on July 8)

Overall effects
- Fatalities: 3
- Injuries: Unknown
- Damage: Unknown
- Areas affected: Interior Plains, particularly Alberta, Canada
- Part of the Tornadoes of 1927

During the period of July 8–9, 1927, a potent upper-air system moved throughout the Interior Plains region, triggering the formation of several tornadoes and causing severe wind events. This tornado outbreak, featuring at least 17 confirmed tornadoes, mainly affected the Canadian province of Alberta; however, effects were also seen in Ontario, Saskatchewan, and the U.S. states of Iowa, Minnesota, and South Dakota. Various historic photographs, many of which were important to meteorological studies at the time, originated from this event; this includes Lucille Handberg's photo sequence of a slender, 'sheathed' tornado near Jasper, Minnesota on July 8, and Charlie Jones' photograph of a tornado passing near Vulcan, Alberta on July 8, which has since been digitized and uploaded to the NOAA Photo Archives. An unknown number of injuries was reported, and three deaths were confirmed, all being from a tornado that impacted Gull Lake and Wetaskiwin, Alberta, on July 8.

== Meteorological background ==
=== July 8 ===
The synoptic pattern for July 8, 1927 featured various high-pressure and low-pressure systems interacting throughout the Plains region, generating ample shear and boundary dynamics (Note: In synoptic meteorology, boundaries, also known as fronts, are zones separating two or more types of air masses. They are generated by differences in atmospheric pressure (i.e. "lows" and "highs"), as well as temperature and moisture differences.) to cause the formation of tornadoes. Two surface highs overspread Alberta and Wisconsin, and a very strong and well-defined area of low pressure existed over Southern Manitoba, which caused a northward turn in the isotherms in the southeast quadrant of the low. Such a turn is usually associated with an environment supportive of tornadoes, as tornadoes form between the leading warm front and trailing cold front in a low-pressure area. Because the surface low over Manitoba moved slowly, this allowed it to advect very high moisture values into the region. Multiple weather stations, including those at St. Paul, Minnesota, Des Moines, Iowa, Sioux City, Iowa, and Yankton, South Dakota, observed dew point values in the upper-50's and low-60's during the morning of July 8, 1927. By the afternoon, the weather station at Yankton even reported a dew point of 67 °F (19 °C), which is considered extremely high. In the area, daytime temperatures also reached 80–90 °F (27–32 °C).

=== July 9 ===
According to hand-drawn synoptic weather maps on July 9, 1927, an occluded front was draped over northern Alberta, with multiple influencing systems surrounding the occluded front, such as a low-pressure system over Wisconsin, a high-pressure system over the northern Pacific Ocean, and a pair of low-and-high-pressure systems off the southern coast of Alaska. A deep trough extended over Alberta and Montana, creating a highly-sheared environment based on the shear vectors in the area. Much of the tornado-related activity on this day was in the Calgary area, in southern Alberta.

Weather maps for July 8 and July 9, 1927

== Confirmed tornadoes ==
Confirmed tornadoes by Fujita rating
FU	F0	F1	F2	F3	F4	F5	Total
16	0	1	0	0	0	0	17

=== July 8 event ===
List of confirmed tornadoes – Friday, July 8, 1927 (Note: All dates are based on the local time zone where the tornado touched down; however, all times are in Coordinated Universal Time for consistency.)
F#	Location	Municipality / County	Province / State	Approximate time (UTC)	Fatalities	Injuries
FU	Maskwacis area	Ponoka	Alberta	18:00–?	0	0
FU	Unclassified tornado near Maskwacis, Alberta (previously known as Hobbema), at around 12:00 p.m. MDT.					
FU	Homeglen area	Ponoka	Alberta	18:00–?	0	0
FU	Unclassified tornado near Homeglen, Alberta, at around 12:00 p.m. MDT.					
FU	Rocky Mountain House	Clearwater	Alberta	20:30–?	0	Unknown
FU	A devastating tornado struck the center of Rocky Mountain House, Alberta, in the afternoon hours of July 8, 1927. Virtually every building in town suffered some form of damage, whether cosmetic or internal. One resident described this tornado as "three minutes of hell unadorned". Despite a direct impact on a populated area, there were no reported injuries or deaths. It is thought that the storm system that produced this tornado also dropped a tornado near Gull Lake and Wetaskiwin, Alberta, which killed three.					
FU	Eckville area	Lacombe	Alberta	23:00–?	0	0
FU	Unclassified tornado near Eckville, Alberta, at around 5:00 p.m. MDT.					
F1	N of Sherman to NW of Jasper	Minnehaha (SD), Pipestone (MN)	South Dakota, Minnesota	00:00–00:45	0	0
F1	See section on this tornado — A winding tornado moved from Sherman, South Dakota, to Jasper, Minnesota, in a duration of around 45 minutes. Sherman resident Lucille Handberg's photographs of this tornado are considered some of the finest of their era.					
FU	Aspen Beach Provincial Park	Lacombe	Alberta	01:00–?	0	0
FU	Numerous garages in the Aspen Beach area were demolished, trees were uprooted, and tents were "blown away".					
FU	Vulcan	Willow Creek, Vulcan	Alberta	01:40–?	0	0
FU	See section on this tornado — Various buildings in Vulcan, including the town's curling rink, were severely damaged or destroyed.					
FU	Ferrybank to Usona	Ponoka	Alberta	03:00–?	0	0
FU	Unclassified tornado near Ferrybank, Alberta, at around 9:00 p.m. MDT.					
FU	Gull Lake to Wetaskiwin	Lacombe, Ponoka	Alberta	Unknown	3	0
FU	Various boats in Gull Lake were capsized or lofted considerable distances, up to 100–500 yd (91–457 m). Near Wetaskiwin, three fatalities occurred when this tornado demolished a granary, where three men were sleeping. Two of these men died immediately, and the third was mortally wounded, later dying from his injuries. The granary was completely swept from its foundation and its debris was bounced "in jumps" for 200 yd (180 m).					
FU	Rock Valley area	Sioux	Iowa	Unknown	0	0
FU	Originating from the northwest, this tornado struck properties northeast and southeast of Rock Valley. A corn crib was torn "to bits", and a cottonwood tree was uprooted and thrown over the garage of a farmstead. A rainbow accompanied the tornado, as did a vibrant sky.					

=== July 9 event ===
List of confirmed tornadoes – Saturday, July 9, 1927
F#	Location	Municipality / County	Province / State	Approximate time (UTC)	Fatalities	Injuries
FU	De Winton area	Foothills	Alberta	18:00–?	0	1
FU	Near De Winton, several barns and farmsteads were completely destroyed, and a line of poles was downed for 2 mi (3.2 km). A boy by the name of Alfred Linn, 13, was reported as being severely injured; he was admitted to the Calgary Hospital. Hail as large as hens' eggs accompanied the tornado, as did a black sky and "clouds of dust", according to the Calgary Herald.					
FU	Indus area	Rocky View	Alberta	18:00–?	0	0
FU	Unclassified tornado near Indus, Alberta, at around 12:00 p.m. MDT.					
FU	Okotoks area	Foothills	Alberta	18:00–?	0	0
FU	Unclassified tornado near Okotoks, Alberta, at around 12:00 p.m. MDT.					
FU	Youngstown area	Special Area No. 3	Alberta	18:00–?	0	0
FU	Unclassified tornado near Youngstown, Alberta, at around 12:00 p.m. MDT.					
FU	SW of Okotoks	Foothills	Alberta	20:30–?	0	0
FU	Unclassified tornado southwest of Okotoks, Alberta, at around 2:30 p.m. MDT.					
FU	Rowley area	Starland	Alberta	21:00–?	0	0
FU	Unclassified tornado near Rowley, Alberta, at around 3:00 p.m. MDT.					
FU	Cereal area	Special Area No. 3	Alberta	22:00–?	0	0
FU	Unclassified tornado near Cereal, Alberta, at around 4:00 p.m. MDT.					

=== Jasper, Minnesota ===
Jasper, Minnesota
- A close-proximity photograph of the tornado near Jasper

Meteorological history
- Formed: July 8, 1927, 7:00 p.m. CDT (UTC–05:00)
- Dissipated: July 8, 1927, 7:45 p.m. CDT (UTC–05:00)
- Duration: 45 minutes

F1 tornado
- on the Fujita scale
- Highest winds: 73–112 mph (117–180 km/h)

Overall effects
- Fatalities: 0
- Injuries: 0

==== Tornado summary ====
Touching down at around 7:00 p.m. local time near Sherman, South Dakota, and extending from what witnesses described as a boiling mass of clouds, the Jasper tornado took an erratic path to the east, striking multiple farmsteads and properties along its path. At points, the tornado was suspected to have stalled or quickly changed directions, due in part to the disconnect between the tornado's storm base and its surface-level circulation. Upon its initial formation, the tornado appeared as a "lead-colored tentacle". Numerous witnesses observed that the whirl of the tornado was similar to that of an airplane. It assumed a southeasterly motion, approaching and striking the farmstead of Oscar Kulsrod. Here, the chimney from the home was removed, several trees were downed, and plate ware was sucked from within the home and distributed across the property. Over 2 mi (3.2 km), the tornado began to meander further to the south, striking the Gunder Petersen property 5 mi (8.0 km) north of Jasper, where only one-half of the home was left after the tornado side-swiped it. A windmill, a water tank, and several outbuildings were windrowed over a square mile of farm fields. Reports indicate that acres of corn were uprooted by the tornado and scattered around the prairie.

As the tornado continued to elongate and the disconnect between its surface winds and storm base became even greater, it acquired multiple loops in its condensation funnel. The tornado dissipated near Jasper, Minnesota, first beginning with the visible funnel "snapping in two", followed by it receding back into the storm base. Montgomery Meigs, a retired civil engineer, estimated the base of the tornado to be 300 ft (91 m) wide at its widest, and theorized that the damage from the tornado was caused by the intense pressure drop in its core.

In his Significant Tornadoes: 1880–1989 book, Thomas P. Grazulis made an indirect reference to the tornado being F1 in intensity, based on damage to "roofs, windmills, and outbuildings" at the Petersen property. Grazulis states that the duration of the tornado was around 45 minutes long.

==== Lucille Handberg's photographs ====
Lucille H. Handberg, a 16-year-old resident of Sherman, South Dakota at the time of the tornado, observed the Jasper tornado as it moved to the east. Grabbing her camera, she followed the tornado for a quarter of a mile, taking three photographs in the process; Lucille snapped the first photograph as the tornado was approaching the Petersen farm, followed by a second photograph when the tornado was approximately 0.25 mi (0.40 km) away from her, and a third when the "broom" (base) of the tornado was directly opposite her, with the storm base of the tornado moving at a right angle to its surface connection. These photographs showed the unusual internal dynamics of the tornado, including its 'sheathed' appearance and winding, rope-like structure. Lucille recounted that the tornado continually expanded and contracted throughout its life, as if it were breathing.

These photographs, which in many articles and reports were deemed some of the finest of the era, were widely circulated around global newspaper headlines. It is reported that Lucille Handberg sent her photographs to Washington, D.C. to purchase a copyright holding. Two of the three photos that Lucille had taken appeared in the August 18, 1928 issue of the The Illustrated London News, as well as in other American publications, such as the September 9, 1928 issue of the San Francisco Examiner. This second photo of the sequence was also featured in the 50th anniversary issue of the Life magazine as a two-page spread, though the photo was misattributed to a tornado in 1943.

=== Vulcan, Alberta ===
Vulcan, Alberta
- Charlie Jones' photograph of the tornado approaching Vulcan; for decades, this was used as the photo for the "tornado" section in the Encyclopædia Britannica.

Meteorological history
- Formed: July 8, 1927, 7:40 p.m. MDT (UTC–06:00)
- Dissipated: Unknown
- Duration: Unknown

FU tornado
- on the Fujita scale
- Highest winds: Unknown

Overall effects
- Fatalities: 0
- Injuries: 0

==== Preceding the cyclone ====
Large hailstones, which witnesses estimated were the size of eggs, or even baseballs in some cases, accompanied the storm that produced the Vulcan tornado. Large crowds were gathered in Vulcan for a Canada Day sports event, which had been postponed the week before due to rain. According to witnesses, the morning of July 8 was warm and clear, but it quickly became humid and "muggy" as storms began to approach in the late afternoon. The hailstones that accompanied the Vulcan supercell smashed through car tops and multiple windows in the downtown area, but nobody was seriously injured, as the people gathered in Vulcan had ample time to seek shelter.

==== Tornado summary ====
As the damaging hailstones persisted, the Vulcan cyclone spawned "just after 7 p.m.", according to the Lethbridge Historical Society. Beginning near the "Old Mallory section", southwest of Vulcan, the tornado struck a series of farmsteads. At W.J. Montgomery's dairy farm, a barn was reduced to splinters and a heavy iron pump was pulled up 20 ft (6.1 m) out of its well. The Hamilton Johnston farm suffered similar destruction, as a farm equipment barn was destroyed and a large threshing machine was lofted and thrown 200 ft (61 m). In total, 150 acres of pure-bread wheat and summer fallow were completely cleared out by the tornado, as well as multiple oat, corn, and potato fields.

The tornado quickly came into view from downtown Vulcan, with a roar that could be "heard for miles". However, those in Vulcan did not panic and watched as the tornado struck downtown, weakening slightly and "flattening out" in the process. Much of the downtown area of Vulcan escaped damage, but the buildings that were impacted by the core of the tornado were severely damaged. The curling and skating rink of Vulcan, which had been constructed in 1923, was directly in the path of the tornado. The curling rink was destroyed, and the walls and roof of the skating rink were completely blown down. Continuing into Vulcan, a large section of a brick-and-tile wall was collapsed at Burrows' Garage. Various livestock barns in and around the town were flattened. Mayor Butchart's vehicle was lofted and thrown 100 yd (91 m). Despite a direct impact on a populated area, nobody was seriously injured or killed by the tornado. However, there were many slight injuries and "narrow escapes" reported in Vulcan.

== Non-tornadic effects ==
Throughout July 8–9, 1927, several windstorms and "terrific" hailstorms were reported, particularly in Alberta and Saskatchewan. Large hailstones, estimated to be the size of eggs, accompanied the Vulcan tornado on July 8, and hailstones the size of hens' eggs accompanied the De Winton tornado on July 9. Crops, farms, and business structures alike were damaged by the storm event, and numerous people were injured. A severe windstorm impacted Kerrobert, Saskatchewan on July 9, causing extensive damage and even blowing down a large barn; it remains ambiguous whether this was caused by straight-line winds or a tornado. Also on July 9, a significant windstorm stuck Gleichen, Alberta, a severe hailstorm reportedly occurred 27 mi (43 km) northeast of Calgary, and hailstorms extending from Regina to Indian Head "ruined gardens" and caused significant damage to buildings. In Moosomin, Saskatchewan, hailstones caused great damage, smashing through the glass panes of homes, business buildings, and public structures in town. 9 mi (14 km) to the west, farmers in the community of Red Jacket were "hailed out". Milo, Alberta saw 3 oz hailstones on July 8. In one instance, a passenger train traveling within Alberta was stopped due to a barn roof and timbers lining the tracks. After the debris was cleared from the tracks and the train was able to proceed, it was again stopped by heavy hail, which had to be removed from the tracks. It is estimated that these storms possibly caused $2 million (1927 CAD) in crop damage in Saskatchewan, and "millions" overall, with damage so widespread that officials could not make an accurate prediction of the incurred costs. One indirect fatality took place when a man by the name of William Raitz, 21, of Watrous, Saskatchewan, was struck by lightning while driving a horse-drawn carriage. Thousands of insurance reports were filed by farmers for hail-related damage.

== In media & popular culture ==
The album cover for Siouxsie and the Banshees' 1986 album, Tinderbox. Lucille Handberg's photograph of the Jasper tornado can be clearly seen.

The Jasper tornado gained a particular reputation due to the use of Lucille Handberg's second photograph of the tornado in various album covers, including Stormbringer by Deep Purple (1974) and Tinderbox by Siouxsie and the Banshees (1986). With each of these albums, artistic liberties were taken, and the photograph of the tornado was modified.

Charlie Jones' photograph of the Vulcan, Alberta tornado approaching town — one photograph in a sequence of multiple — was used as the pictorial illustration for the "tornado" section in the Encyclopædia Britannica for several decades. The photograph is considered one of the most well-defined of its era, which is what lead to its use in the encyclopedia.

== See also ==
- Edmonton tornado — Alberta's most fatal and well-known tornado, occurring 60 years later
- 2007 Southern Manitoba tornado outbreak — Another potent Canadian tornado outbreak, which featured various intense to violent tornadoes
- List of Canadian tornadoes and tornado outbreaks
- List of meteorological photos and videos
