= 2012 Buenos Aires tornadoes =

On April 4, 2012, a strong storm system in the province of Buenos Aires affected most of the Greater Buenos Aires area, including Ciudad de Buenos Aires. The storm system killed 27 people, injured 893, and inflicted material damage valued at 275.5 million Argentine pesos.

== Meteorological synopsis ==
On 4 April 2012, the atmospheric conditions over northeastern Argentina were highly favorable to the development of thunderstorms. This area was downwind of a mid-tropospheric trough centered over San Luis, producing diverging wind flow over portions of central and northern Buenos Aires Province. This environment exhibited reduced stability conducive to thunderstorm growth, with northern parts of the Buenos Aires area bearing 800 J/kg of convective available potential energy (CAPE). Ample moisture was also available as indicated by equivalent potential temperature values exceeding 330 K aloft. During the day, a wedge-shaped cold front advanced northwestward towards the Rio de la Plata from a position southwest of Buenos Aires Province. The front forced the warm and humid air upwards, triggering storm formation. By 7:40 p.m. ART (UTC-3:00), infrared satellite imagery indicated cloud top temperatures falling to −70 °C (−94 °F). The storms reached the Rio de la Plata by 8:40 p.m.

According to the radar observations and preliminary reports by the National Meteorlogical Service of Argentina, the storm system took the shape of a bow echo that spawned four tornados, two F1 and two F2 tornadoes on the Fujita scale.

For their intensity, level of destruction and peculularity, these storms are the most destructive to hit the Buenos Aires-La Plata metropolitan area in its history.

== Affected areas ==
According to the final report by the National Meteorological Service, the phenomenon was classified as tornados. In some sectors the intensity was F1 and in others F2 with wind speeds up to 258 kilometers per hour.

The overall damages occurred in an area about 40 km wide that extends from the western municipalities of Luján, Marcos Paz, and Glew to La Plata on the coast. The tornados formed south of Luján, some seven kilometers from Ruta Nacional 5.

On the same day was the second day of the Quilmes Rock music festival, taking place in the Estadio River Plate. In spite of everything, the headlining bands (Foo Fighters and Arctic Monkeys) did not suspend their respective shows.

== Victims and damages ==
Eight people died in Buenos Aires and 18 died in the greater Buenos Aires metropolitan area. One person died in the city of Santa Fe.

In the first four days following the tornados, 5.5 million tree trunks and branches were withdrawn from the capital city alone. More than 1400 roads were closed for days, some for weeks, due to blockage by trees, poles or debris.

Ten thousand people were left without telephone service, and one month after the tornados, four thousand people were still without service. A total of 79,760 trees fell or were destroyed, causing damage to 500 homes and some 400 cars. Many schools went without classes and many others were forced to relocate classes due to instability in the school building structures. In areas without running water, the destruction of the electrical grid left many people without pumpers, and they went without water in their tanks for weeks. In just Morón, 50 houses were completely destroyed while 800 lost their roofs.
