= 2023 Northern Italy storms =

2023 storms in Italy

Meteorological history
- Duration: 18-25 July 2023

Storm impact
- Fatalities: 0
- Injuries: 130+
- Areas affected: Northern Italy
- Part of the 2023 European heatwaves

From 18–25 July 2023, several rounds of destructive hailstorms and supercells brought significant severe weather to portions of Northern Italy. The supercells produced hailstones of record-breaking sizes and damaged numerous comunes throughout the severe weather sequence.

== Climatological background ==
Northern Italy has been cited as one of the regions in Europe with the highest amount of hail. In the region, hail-producing storms usually pick up in frequency in May and reaches the highest storm frequency in June, with a high threat of hailstorms spreading from the Po Valley region in Northeast Italy, to the Adriatic coast in Northwest Italy. Hail frequency drops off in July and August, and in September and October an abrupt decrease in hail activity occurs.

The July 2023 storms were directly preceded and accompanied by a series of severe heatwaves that affected Italy through July. The heatwave acted as a hot airmass that had situated over Southern Europe a week prior to the severe weather sequence; the airmass produced several days of observed environments that were conducive to the development of rotating supercell thunderstorms.

== Timeline ==
=== 19 July ===
Three long-tracked supercells produced large hail up to 16 centimetres (6.3 in) in diameter in the Carmignano di Brenta community; the hail is the largest in European history to have been verified involving a photograph. At least 111 people were injured by hail on 19 July, as several towns suffered infrastructure damage.

=== 21 July ===
"Torrential rain" occurred across Northern Italy on July 21, accompanied by large hail and high winds. A flash flood impacted the community of Seregno, and a hailstorm tracked through the Venice area. An overnight hailstorm in the Lombardia region produced hailstones up to 13 centimetres (5.1 in) in diameter. High winds of up to 60 mph (97 km/h) were recorded in Monza, causing severe damage to the Monza Circuit including the felling of over 10,000 trees.

=== 22 July ===
Two long-tracked, hail-producing supercells moved across Northern Italy, dropping large hail in the comune of Terre del Reno and injuring five people. In addition to large hailstones, a destructive IF3 tornado touched down and tracked through the Romagna region, injuring 14 people. While the condensation funnel itself was not visible, the tornado was estimated to have been approximately 1,500 metres (0.93 mi) in width. The supercell that produced the tornado had a hail swath length of approximately 230 kilometres (140 mi), although the total swath length was "likely much longer".

=== 24 July ===
On 24 July, a particularly strong supercell storm caused extreme wind damage in Lombardy, Veneto and all northern Italy. Delta Air Lines Flight 185 departing from Milan Malpensa Airport and bound for New York JFK was diverted to Rome-Fiumicino Airport, after being damaged by a violent hailstorm. The Boeing 767 involved sustained damage to the right wing, both engines, the radome, and the wing leading edges. The National Agency for the Safety of Flight, Italy's aviation accident investigation agency, rated the event an accident.

=== 25 July ===
Two supercells produced "giant" hail as they tracked through Northern Italy; one of the cells dropped hailstones measured at an estimated 12.5 centimetres (4.9 in) in the Castiglione delle Stiviere comune.

== Impacts ==
More than 100 people were injured by large hailstones during the severe weather sequence.
