= Tornadoes in Iceland =

Tornadoes in the country of Iceland

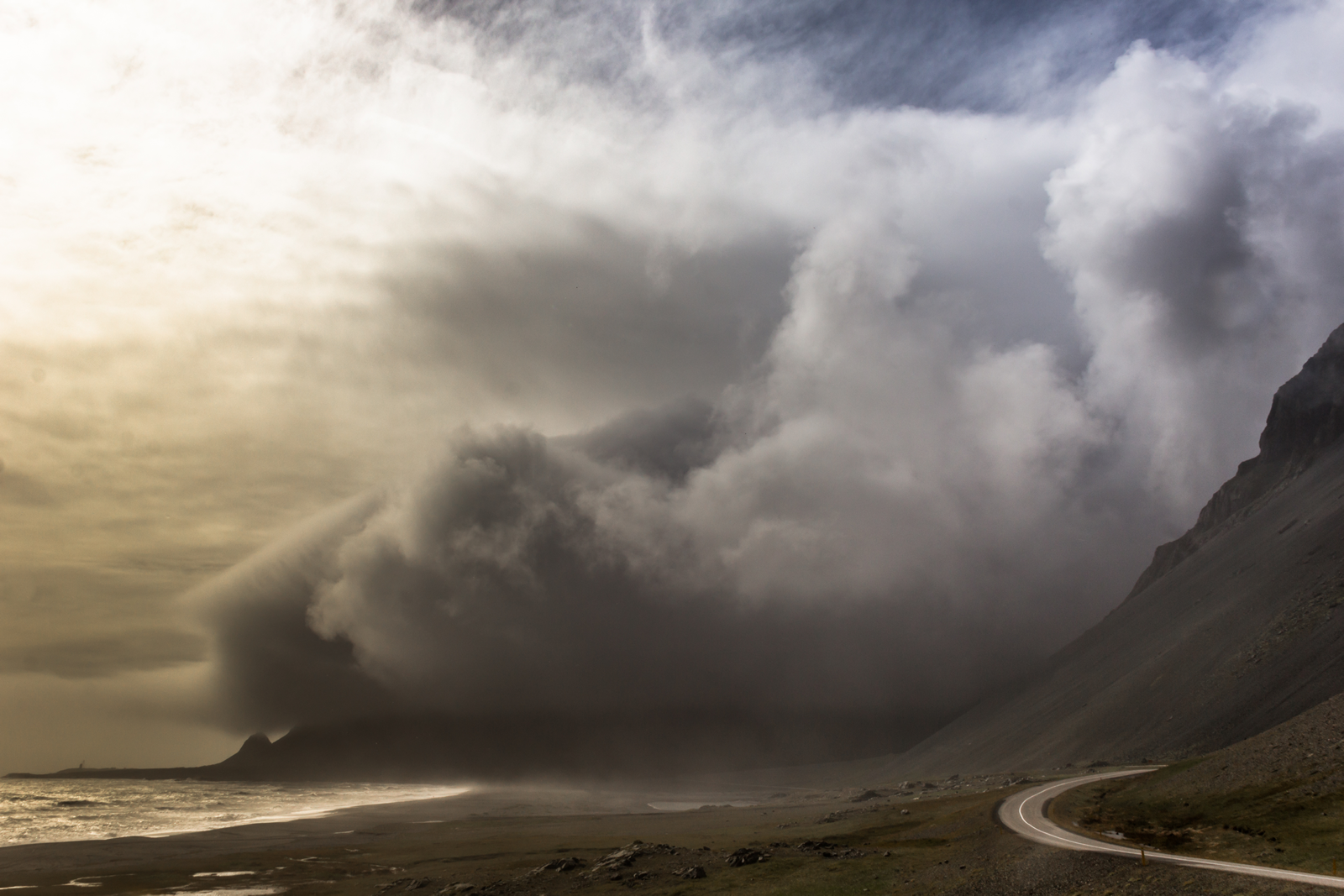
Storm clouds in Iceland in 2016, which produced a tornado

Tornadoes in the country of Iceland are extremely rare, with only 13 events ever being recorded in the country's history. No fatalities or injuries have ever been recorded because of tornadoes in Iceland, and the highest rated tornado to ever occur was an IF2

== Climatology ==
Thunderstorms are extremely rare for any specific location in Iceland, with fewer than five storms per year in the southern part of the island. They are most common in early or late summer. They can be caused by warm air masses coming up from Europe, or deep lows from the southwest in wintertime. Lightning can usually be observed in connection with ash plumes erupting from the island's volcanoes. Vortices, sometimes on the scale of tornadoes, also occur with volcanic eruptions. Landspouts and waterspouts are occasionally observed. Classic mesocyclone derived tornadoes (i.e. forming from supercells) are very rare, but have been observed. Any of these do occasionally cause damage, although the sparse population further reduces the probability of detection and the hazard.

== Events ==
FU	F0	F1	F2	F3	F4	F5
9	0	0	1	0	0	0

- July 27, 2007 – An FU tornado was documented around 3 miles northeast of Skaftafell, causing an unknown amount of damage.
- July 28, 2007 – A relatively brief FU tornado touched down northwest of Vík, causing minor damage to plants in the area.
- September 7, 2009 – An FU tornado touched down north of Eyrarbakki, damaging plants, trees and other things in its path. Little information is known about this tornado, or what exactly it damaged.
- July 10, 2010 – An FU tornado was reported by observers off the coast of Grindavík. This tornado caused no damage, and may have been a waterspout.
- September 3–13, 2014 – See section A brief FU tornado tracked over uninhabited land in central Iceland, causing no damage. Multiple "lava tornadoes" were recorded from the span of September 3–13.
- August 2, 2016 – A relatively brief FU tornado touched down directly west of Reykholt, damaging the ground and an unknown amount of structures. Although the tornado was never documented, it was confirmed via radar.
- August 14, 2016 – A brief FU tornado tracked 0.2 km (0.12 miles) over uninhabited land near Bogarnes, causing an unknown amount of damage.
- August 24, 2018 – An extremely rare IF2/T3 tornado touched down 15+ miles east of Vík, damaging an unknown amount of structures or plants. The tornado occurred over uninhabited land, so it is believed that the tornado did not impact any structures or cause any major damage.

Lava tornadoes of September 3-13, 2014
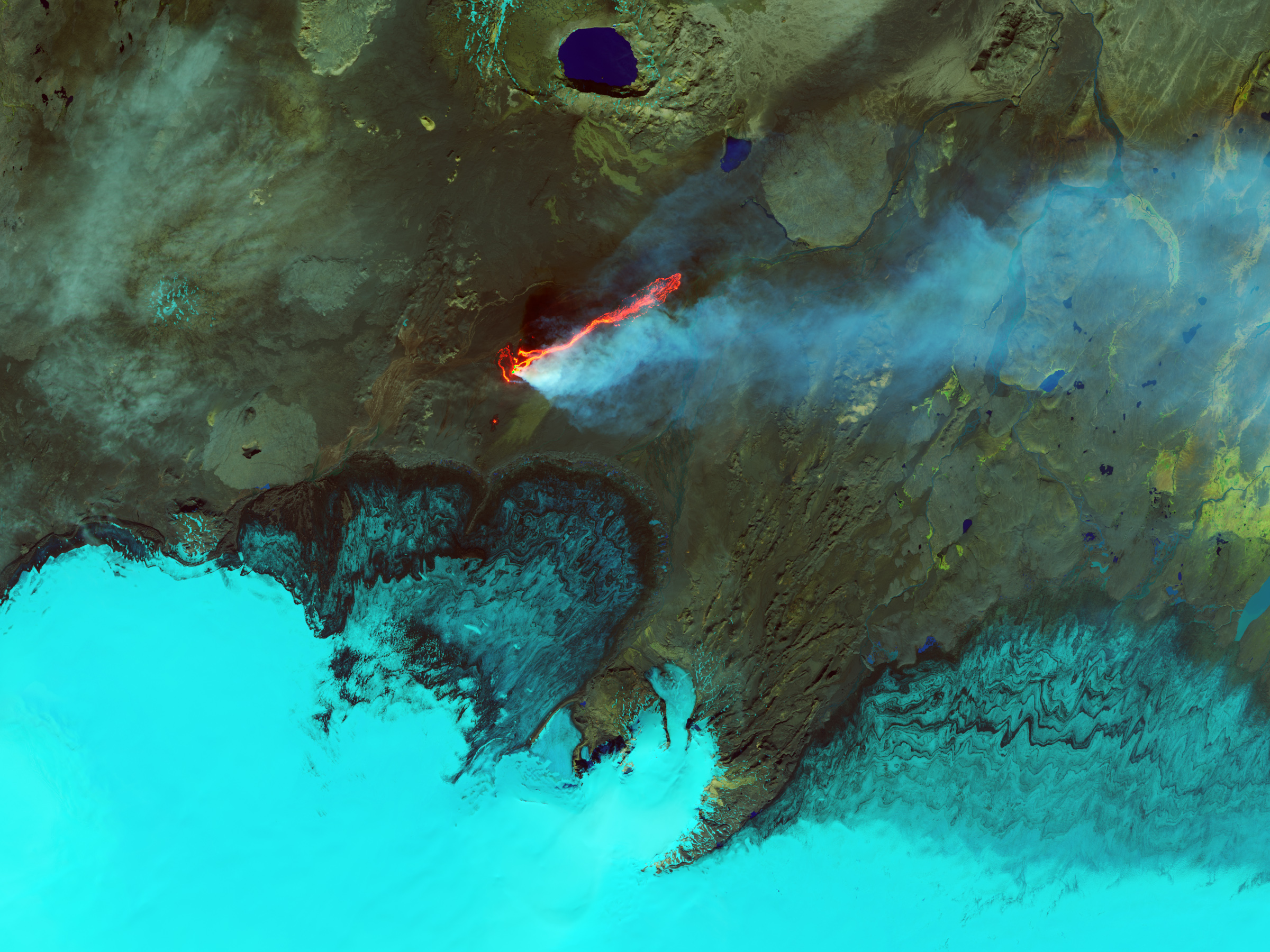
- The Holuhraun lava flow that spawned the tornadoes on September 4, 2014

Tornado outbreak
- Tornadoes: 4-6
- Max. rating: FU tornado

Overall effects
- Areas affected: Holuhraun

=== Lava tornadoes of September 3–13, 2014 ===
From the days of September 3 to September 13 of 2014, a volcanic eruption and subsequent lava field spawned multiple lava and fire tornadoes, an extremely rare phenomenon in which smoke from a fire (most commonly from wildfires, but can also be found in other events) mixes with cold atmosphere, creating an extremely hot rotating cloud of smoke which can ignite objects it tracks through.

On September 3, a cloud of sulfur dioxide gas originating from the Holuhraun lava flow caused the formation of a fire whirl, which consisted of a column stretching 3,300 feet (about 1 kilometer) into the air. A remotely monitored infrared camera caught the event on video. Multiple other "lava tornadoes" touched down in the days following, many of which were brief and only touched the ground for 5–10 seconds.
