= List of European tornadoes in 2010 =

This is a list of all tornadoes that were confirmed throughout Europe by the European Severe Storms Laboratory and local meteorological agencies during 2010. Unlike the United States, the original Fujita Scale and the TORRO scale are used to rank tornadoes across the continent.

== European yearly total ==
Tornadoes by Country
| Country | Total | F? | F0 | F1 | F2 | F3 | F4 | F5 |
| Armenia | 2 | 2 | 0 | 0 | 0 | 0 | 0 | 0 |
| Austria | 4 | 1 | 1 | 1 | 1 | 0 | 0 | 0 |
| Belarus | 3 | 2 | 0 | 0 | 1 | 0 | 0 | 0 |
| Belgium | 5 | 3 | 1 | 1 | 0 | 0 | 0 | 0 |
| Croatia | 6 | 3 | 0 | 3 | 0 | 0 | 0 | 0 |
| Czech Republic | 2 | 2 | 0 | 0 | 0 | 0 | 0 | 0 |
| Denmark | 2 | 2 | 0 | 0 | 0 | 0 | 0 | 0 |
| Estonia | 0 | 0 | 0 | 0 | 0 | 0 | 0 | 0 |
| Finland | 2 | 1 | 0 | 1 | 0 | 0 | 0 | 0 |
| France | 12 | 2 | 6 | 4 | 0 | 0 | 0 | 0 |
| Germany | 45 | 31 | 4 | 6 | 3 | 1 | 0 | 0 |
| Greece | 2 | 1 | 1 | 0 | 0 | 0 | 0 | 0 |
| Hungary | 7 | 4 | 2 | 1 | 0 | 0 | 0 | 0 |
| Italy | 16 | 5 | 6 | 5 | 0 | 0 | 0 | 0 |
| Latvia | 2 | 2 | 0 | 0 | 0 | 0 | 0 | 0 |
| Lithuania | 1 | 1 | 0 | 0 | 0 | 0 | 0 | 0 |
| Netherlands | 4 | 3 | 1 | 0 | 0 | 0 | 0 | 0 |
| Norway | 1 | 0 | 0 | 1 | 0 | 0 | 0 | 0 |
| Poland | 7 | 1 | 2 | 3 | 1 | 0 | 0 | 0 |
| Portugal | 6 | 2 | 1 | 3 | 0 | 0 | 0 | 0 |
| Romania | 6 | 2 | 0 | 4 | 0 | 0 | 0 | 0 |
| Russia | 23 | 10 | 0 | 12 | 1 | 0 | 0 | 0 |
| Serbia | 5 | 4 | 0 | 1 | 0 | 0 | 0 | 0 |
| Slovenia | 1 | 0 | 1 | 0 | 0 | 0 | 0 | 0 |
| Slovakia | 0 | 0 | 0 | 0 | 0 | 0 | 0 | 0 |
| Spain | 7 | 5 | 0 | 2 | 0 | 0 | 0 | 0 |
| Sweden | 9 | 4 | 2 | 3 | 0 | 0 | 0 | 0 |
| Turkey | 14 | 7 | 0 | 6 | 2 | 0 | 0 | 0 |
| Ukraine | 17 | 9 | 0 | 6 | 2 | 0 | 0 | 0 |
| United Kingdom | 2 | 1 | 0 | 0 | 1 | 0 | 0 | 0 |
| Totals | 221 | 107 | 27 | 68 | 16 | 1 | 0 | 0 |

== January ==
=== January 1 event ===
List of reported tornadoes - Friday, January 1, 2010
| F# | T# | Location | District/ County | Coord. | Time (UTC) | Path length | Comments/Damage |
|---|---|---|---|---|---|---|---|
Italy
| F1 | T2 | Borgo Piave | Lazio | 41.48°N 12.87°E | 0945 | 5 kilometres (3.1 mi) | |
Turkey
| F? | T? | Bursa | Bursa Province | 40.19°N 29.06°E | 1100 | Unknown | Tornado damaged two homes and several vehicles in Bursa |
Sources: ESSL Severe Weather Database

=== January 5 event ===
List of reported tornadoes - Tuesday, January 1, 2010
| F# | T# | Location | District/ County | Coord. | Time (UTC) | Path length | Comments/Damage |
|---|---|---|---|---|---|---|---|
Spain
| F? | T? | La Mojonera | Andalucía | 37.30°N 2.43°W | 0300 | Unknown | Tornado damaged crops and a greenhouse |
Sources: ESSL Severe Weather Database

=== January 9 event ===
- F? in Croatia

=== January 10 event ===
- F1 in Turkey

=== January 23 event ===
- F? in Portugal

== February ==
=== February 2 event ===
- F1 in Turkey

=== February 3 event ===
- F1 / T3 in Turkey

=== February 5 event ===
- F0 / T1 in France
- F0 in France

=== February 7 event ===
- F? in Turkey

=== February 12 event ===
- F? in Greece

=== February 21 event ===
- F? in Spain
- F1 in Spain

=== February 22 event ===
- F0 / T1 in Portugal
- F1 / T2 in Portugal
- F0 / T1 in Belgium

=== February 23 event ===
- F? in Spain
- F1 in Portugal

=== February 25 event ===
- F1 in France

== March ==
=== March 7 event ===
- F1 in Turkey

=== March 16 event ===
- F2 in Turkey
- F? in Turkey

=== March 29 event ===
- F1 / T2 in France
- F1 in France
- F? in Turkey

=== March 30 event ===
- F1 in France

=== March 31 event ===
- F1 in Italy

== April ==
=== April 7 event ===
- F0 in France

=== April 8 event ===
- F1 in Turkey
- F1 in Turkey

=== April 16 event ===
- F1 in Portugal
- F? in Portugal
- F1 in Spain
- F? in Spain

=== April 18 event ===
- F? in Spain

=== April 21 event ===
- F? in Turkey

=== April 27 event ===
- F0 / T0 in Italy

== May ==
=== May 6 event ===
- F0 in Italy

=== May 7 event ===
- F? in Croatia
- F1 in Croatia

=== May 10 event ===
- F? in Russia

=== May 12 event ===
- F? in Russia
- F? in Serbia

=== May 13 event ===
- F? in Italy
- F? in Austria

=== May 14 event ===
- F? in Hungary

=== May 16 event ===
- F1 in Croatia
- F1 in Serbia

=== May 17 event ===
- F? in Croatia

=== May 18 event ===
- F? in Ukraine
- F? in Ukraine
- F? in Ukraine
- F2 / T4 in Poland
- F? in Poland

=== May 19 event ===
- F1 in Italy

=== May 20 event ===
- F1 / T3 in Poland
- F0 in Poland

=== May 21 event ===
- F? in Denmark

=== May 24 event ===
- F2 in Germany
- F3 in Germany 1 fatality
- F? in Czech Republic
- F1 in Poland
- F1 / T2 in Poland
- F1 / T3 in Poland
- F0 / T1 in Hungary

=== May 25 event ===
- F1 / T3 in Ukraine
- F2 / T5 in Ukraine
- F? in Ukraine
- F? in Russia

=== May 26 event ===
- F1 / T3 in Austria
- F2 / T4 in Austria
- F1 / T3 in Romania

=== May 29 event ===
- F2 in Turkey

=== May 30 event ===
- F0 / T1 in Hungary
- F? in Hungary

=== May 31 event ===
- F? in Serbia

== June ==
=== June 2 event ===
- F1 in Hungary
- F? in Hungary

=== June 5 event ===
- F? in Russia
- F1 in Russia
- F1 / T2 in Russia

=== June 6 event ===
- F? in Belgium
- F? in Belgium

=== June 8 event ===
- F1 / T3 in Russia
- F2 in the United Kingdom
- F? in the United Kingdom
- F? in the Netherlands

=== June 9 event ===
- F1 / T2 in Germany
- F1 / T3 in Germany

=== June 11 event ===
- F? in Germany
- F0 in France

=== June 12 event ===
- F? in Armenia
- F2 / T4 in Russia

=== June 14 event ===
- F1 in Russia
- F1 / T3 in Russia
- F? in France
- F? in France
- F? in Hungary

=== June 16 event ===
- F1 in Romania

=== June 18 event ===
- F0 in Greece
- F1 in Romania

=== June 19 event ===
- F0 in Italy
- F0 in Italy
- F1 in Italy
- F0/T0 in Slovenia

=== June 20 event ===
- F2 in Belarus
- F? in Ukraine

=== June 21 event ===
- F1 in Italy
- F? in Armenia
- F? in Czech Republic

=== June 22 event ===
- F1 in Ukraine
- F1/T3 in Norway

=== June 23 event ===
- F1/T2 in Ukraine

=== June 27 event ===
- F? in Russia
- F1/T3 in Russia

=== June 28 event ===
- F? in Romania

=== June 29 event ===
- F? in Ukraine
- F? in Turkey

=== June 30 event ===
- F? in Ukraine

== July ==
=== July 5 event ===
- F? in Italy

=== July 6 event ===
- F1/T3 in Ukraine
- F? in Romania

=== July 7 event ===
- F? in Russia
- F1/T2 in Russia
- F? in Russia

=== July 8 event ===
- F1 in Russia

=== July 9 event ===
- F? in Russia

=== July 11 event ===
- F? in Ukraine
- F1 in Russia
- F? in Sweden

=== July 12 event ===
- F? in Germany
- F? in the Netherlands
- F0 in France
- F? in Sweden

=== July 13 event ===
- F0/T1 in Sweden
- F0/T1 in Sweden
- F? in Sweden

=== July 14 event ===
- F1 in Belgium
- F? in the Netherlands
- F? in Germany
- F? in Germany

=== July 16 event ===
- F? in Belgium

=== July 17 event ===
- F0 in Italy

=== July 18 event ===
- F1 in Sweden
- F1 in Sweden

=== July 19 event ===
- F2/T4 in Ukraine

=== July 21 event ===
- F? in Ukraine
- F1/T2 in Russia

=== July 22 event ===
- F1 in Sweden
- F? in Sweden

=== July 23 event ===
- F0 in Austria
- F? in Italy
- F? in Italy
- F0 in France

=== July 24 event ===
- F1/T2 in Croatia
- F? in Latvia

=== July 26 event ===
- F? in Serbia
- F? in Serbia
- F1/T3 in Ukraine
- F1 in Finland

=== July 27 event ===
- F1 in Ukraine

=== July 28 event ===
- F0 in the Netherlands
- F1/T3 in Romania
- F? in Lithuania
- F? in Belarus
- F? in Belarus
- F? in Latvia

=== July 29 event ===
- F? in Denmark
- F? in Germany
- F? in Russia
- F1/T3 in Russia
- F? in Russia
- F1/T3 in Russia

=== July 30 event ===
- F0 in Italy
- F? in Italy

== August ==
=== August 2 event ===
- F0 in France

=== August 4 event ===
- F? in Germany
- F1 in Finland
- F? in Finland

=== August 5 event ===
- F? in Germany
- F0 in Austria

=== August 6 event ===
- F? in Ukraine

=== August 8 event ===
- F2/T4 in Estonia

=== August 10 event ===
- F1 in Russia

=== August 14 event ===
- F2/T4 in Hungary

=== August 15 event ===
- F? in Slovakia
- F? in Hungary

=== August 16 event ===
- F? in Italy
- F? in Hungary
- F? in Hungary
- F? in Slovakia

=== August 17 event ===
- F? in Poland
- F? in Poland
- F? in Germany
- F0/T1 in Germany

=== August 18 event ===
- F? in Russia
- F? in Lithuania

=== August 19 event ===
- F2 in Russia

=== August 20 event ===
- F1/T2 in Norway

=== August 22 event ===
- F? in Germany
- F? in Germany
- F0/T1 in France

=== August 23 event ===
- F2/T5 in France
- F2/T5 in Germany
- F2/T4 in Germany
- F? in Germany
- F? in Germany
- F? in Germany
- F1/T3 in the United Kingdom

=== August 24 event ===
- F1 in Finland
- F? in Czech Republic

=== August 26 event ===
- F? in Germany
- F1/T3 in France

=== August 27 event ===
- F1/T3 in Germany
- F2/T5 in Poland
- F? in Poland

=== August 28 event ===
- F? in Denmark
- F? in Germany

=== August 30 event ===
- F1 in Germany

=== August 31 event ===
- F1 in Greece

== See also ==
- Tornadoes of 2010
