= Tornadic infrasound =

Tornadic infrasound is the study of infrasound produced by tornadoes, which has been measured between 0.5-6 Hertz.

== History ==
In May 2024, Doctor Bin Liang with the University of Mississippi published a paper on the results of a field research project on tornadoes. During the project, Liang was able to determine "that tornadoes emit dominant low-frequency infrasound between 0.5−1.2 Hertz", after examining tornadic and non-tornadic supercells.

In September 2024, researchers from the National Center for Physical Acoustics, a research center at the University of Mississippi, and Benchtop Engineering LLC, published a paper confirming tornadoes emit measurable infrasound between 2−6 Hertz.

In July 2025, the United States Senate Committee on Appropriations, amid negotiations for the 2026 United States federal budget, encouraged the Office of Oceanic and Atmospheric Research (OAR), a branch of the National Oceanic and Atmospheric Administration (NOAA), "to pursue research on near real-time infrasonic monitoring of tornadoes". They stated that "advanced infrasound signal processing methodologies and studies, deployed through a network of infrasound arrays to detect tornadoes, have the potential to provide accurate and reliable locations and warnings of active tornadoes".
