= CSU-CHILL =

US weather surveillance radar

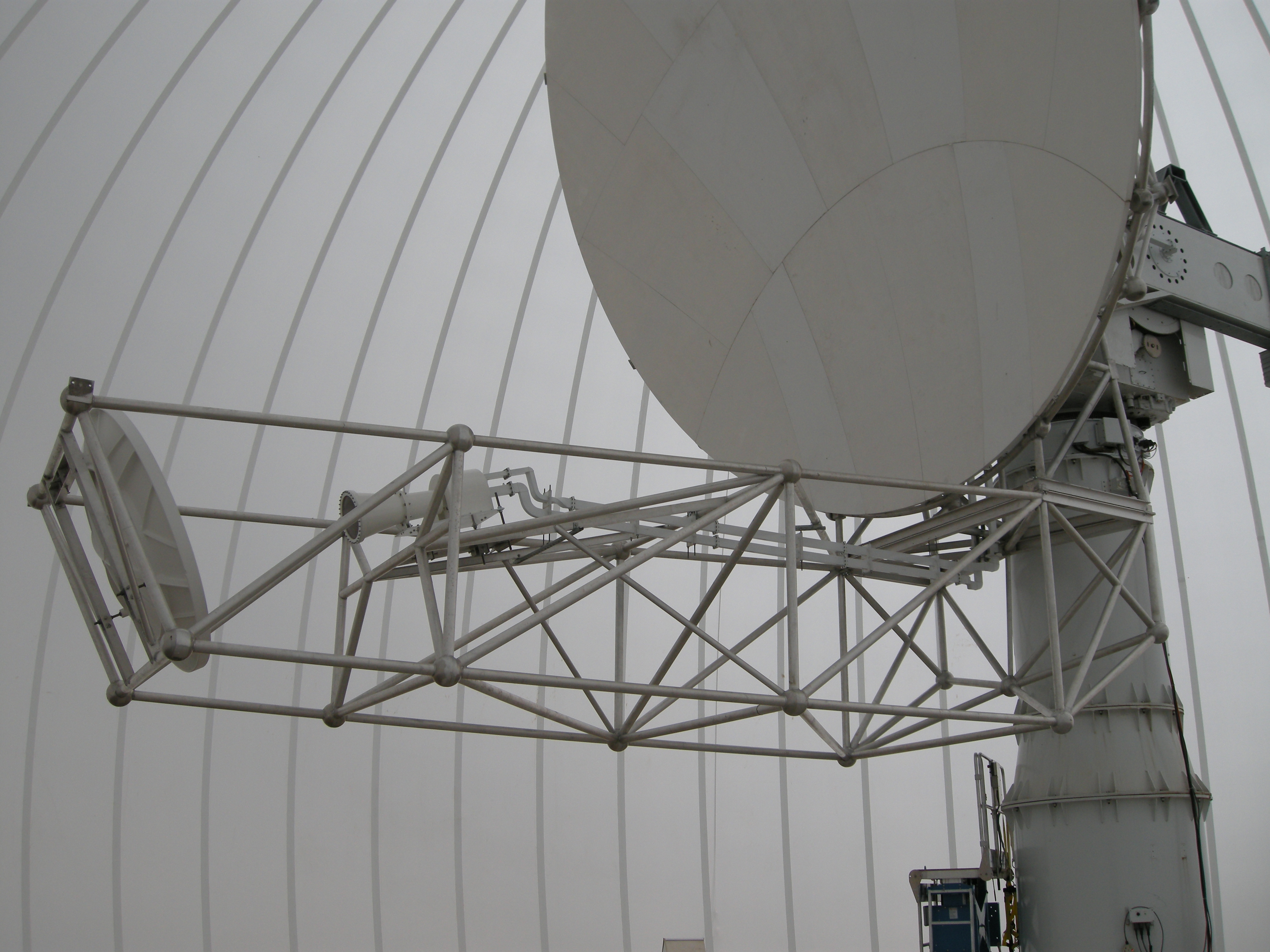
- CSU-CHILL antenna and feed horn
- Country of origin: United States
- No. built: 1
- Type: Weather radar
- Frequency: 2735 MHz (S-band); 9415 MHz (X-band)
- Beamwidth: 1.1°
- RPM: 0-33 deg s^{−1}
- Diameter: 8.5 m
- Elevation: 0°-90°
- Power: 800 kW - 25 kW (S and X-band)

Colorado State University - CHicago ILLinois radar, colloquially CSU-CHILL, is a semi-mobile, dual-frequency weather surveillance radar developed in 1970 by the University of Chicago and the Illinois State Water Survey, which has since been moved to Colorado on behalf of Colorado State University. The radar was operated through a cooperative agreement with the National Science Foundation.

== Description ==
CSU-CHILL is used to study atmospheric principles and precipitation on a small scale with the use of two frequencies. It has a transmitter consisting of both S and X-bands, both using a klystron. Each transmitter can individually transmit its respective frequency through its own feed horn onto the 9m offset parabolic antenna. This configuration also aids in the ability to gather samples from various polarizations. From these, the type of precipitation can be easily discerned.

CSU-CHILL is protected by a pneumatic dome, and is close to its control buildings. It is often positioned near Greeley, Colorado, but is semi-mobile, so that it is movable in separate pieces, and can be quickly assembled or disassembled to participate in a field study.
