= Ted Fujita =

Japanese-American meteorologist (1920–1998)

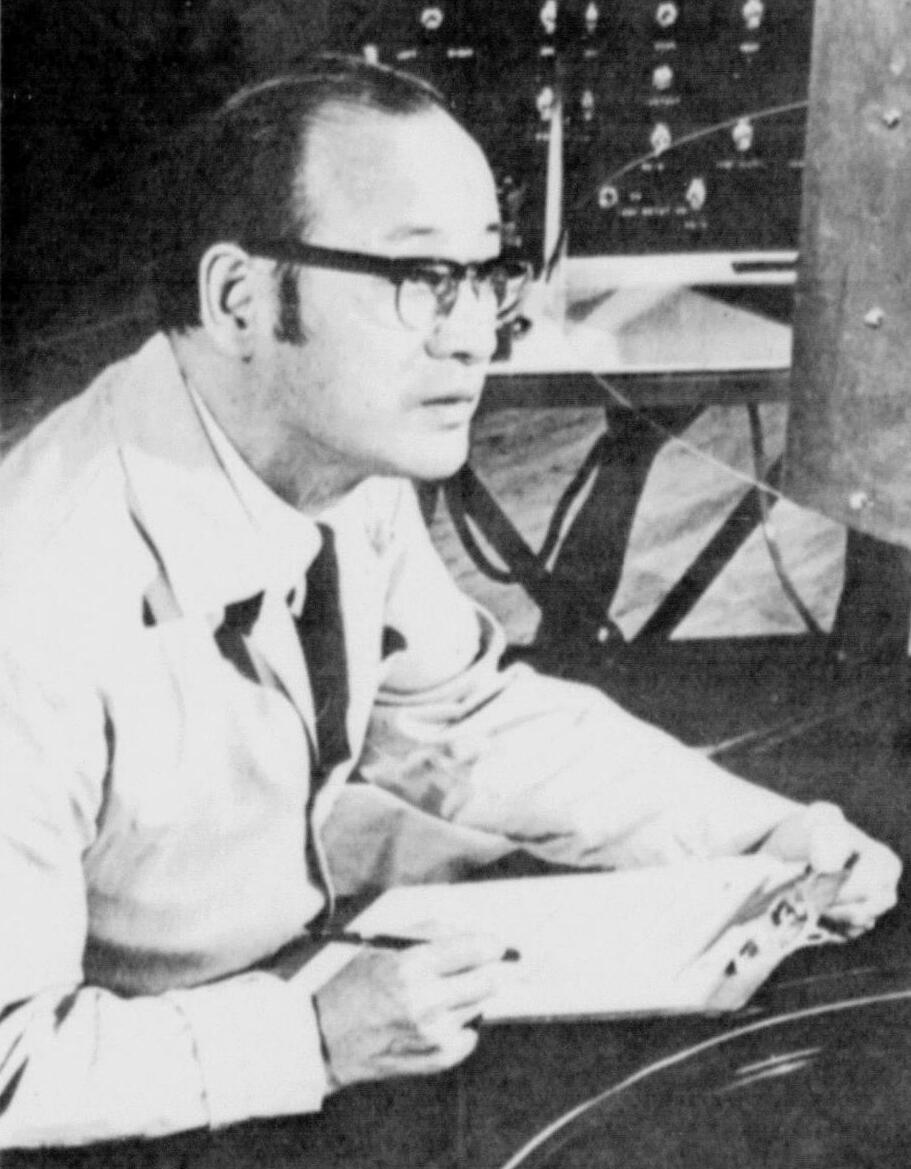
- Fujita in 1972
- Born: October 23, 1920; Sone-mura, Kiku-gun, Fukuoka Prefecture, Empire of Japan
- Died: November 19, 1998 (aged 78); Chicago, Illinois, U.S.
- Citizenship: Japan; United States (after 1968)
- Children: Kazuya Fujita
- Awards: Order of the Sacred Treasure, Gold and Silver Star (1991)
- Scientific career
- Education: Meiji Vocational College (B.S., 1943); University of Tokyo (D.Sc., 1950)
- Known for: tornadoes, tornadic storm morphology, Fujita scale, multiple-vortex tornadoes, downbursts, microbursts, mesoscale meteorology
- Fields: Meteorology
- Workplaces: University of Chicago
- Thesis: Analytical Study of Typhoons (1952)
- Doctoral advisor: Shigekata Syono
- Doctoral students: Roger M. Wakimoto, Gregory S. Forbes

Japanese name
- Kanji: 藤田 哲也
- Hiragana: ふじた てつや
- Katakana: フジタ テツヤ

Tetsuya Theodore Fujita (/ˈfuːdʒiːtɑː/; FOO-jee-tah) (藤田 哲也, Fujita Tetsuya; October 23, 1920 – November 19, 1998) was a Japanese and American meteorologist whose research primarily focused on severe weather. His research at the University of Chicago on severe thunderstorms, tornadoes, hurricanes, and typhoons revolutionized the knowledge of each. Although he is best known for creating the Fujita scale of tornado intensity and damage, he also discovered downbursts and microbursts and was an instrumental figure in advancing modern understanding of many severe weather phenomena and how they affect people, airplanes, and communities, especially through his work exploring the relationship between wind speed and damage.

== Biography ==
Fujita was born October 23, 1920 in the village of Sone, Fukuoka Prefecture, Japan, an area that is now part of the city of Kitakyushu.

=== World War II ===
Fujita resided in Kokura during World War II. Kokura was the primary target for the "Fat Man" plutonium bomb, but on the morning of August 9, 1945, the city was obscured by clouds and smoke from the neighboring city of Yahata, which had been firebombed the day before. As a result, the bomb was dropped on the secondary target, Nagasaki. Fujita was exempt from military service during the war due to poor eyesight. He worked as a physics teacher. In 1953 he moved to America at the invitation of Horace Byers at the University of Chicago.

Studying the damage caused by the nuclear explosions contributed to Fujita's understanding of downbursts and microbursts as "starbursts" of wind hitting the Earth's surface and spreading out.

=== Career ===
Fujita surveyed a tornado alongside Rodger A. Brown in Chicago in June 1961, which occurred March 1961 through the city's South Side. A report described the tornado as "the most destructive" of all of the tornadoes in the city over the previous 90 years. The survey also noted the strange damage patterns of the tornado, with most houses receiving only minor damage to shingles and windows being on the same property as destroyed garages and uprooted trees. Wind patterns and news reports were used to determine that another likely tornado occurring in Homewood at the same time was a "gust of straight-line wind".

Fujita was approached by an expert with the Flight Safety Foundation to investigate the case of Eastern Air Lines Flight 66, a deadly aviation crash that killed 112 under up-to-then unknown circumstances. By comparing the patterns of tree damage near the airport to previously-known patterns of non-tornadic damage, including those he surveyed during the 1974 Super Outbreak, he had come to the conclusion Flight 66 was downed by a downburst. This theory was controversial, with his theory of downbursts disagreeing with the existing theory of downdrafts and some academics not believing downdrafts could be strong enough to produce the aforementioned wind patterns. Fujita surveyed downburst wind patterns in corn fields from a low-flying Cessna plane between 1975 and 1978. The idea to analyze the wind pattern using doppler radar technology originated from the National Center for Atmospheric Research and culminated in Project NIMROD, which established a network of mesonets and doppler radar sites across northern Illinois. This project observed a microburst near Yorkville, Illinois on May 29, 1978, and subsequent analysis of data from this event aligned with Fujita's model of downbursts. Project NIMROD observed about 50 downbursts over its lifespan, and greatly improved the understanding of both the intensity and frequency of these events.

In April 1980, Fujita and other figures of NIMROD discussed their findings at the Conference of Radar Meteorology, which led to Project JAWS, an attempt at creating a higher-resolution model of the downburst. Project JAWS was conducted in the region around Denver, Colorado, between May 15 and August 13, 1982, with a particular focus on the "dry microburst" – Fujita's term for microbursts with low reflectivity returns when seen on weather radar. On June 12, 1982, Fujita observed an ongoing tornado for the first time. Project JAWS observed 186 microburst events in total.

He studied and taught at Meiji Vocational College, known after 1949 as Kyushu Institute of Technology. In 1953 he was invited to the University of Chicago by Horace R. Byers, who had become interested in Fujita's research, particularly his independent discovery of the cold air downdraft. Fujita remained at the University of Chicago until his retirement in 1990.

=== Personal life and death ===
Ted Fujita died in his Chicago home on November 19, 1998. The American Meteorological Society (AMS) held the "Symposium on The Mystery of Severe Storms: A Tribute to the Work of T. Theodore Fujita" during its 80th Annual Meeting in January 2000. Storm Track magazine released a special November 1998 issue, "A Tribute To Dr. Ted Fujita" and Weatherwise published "Mr. Tornado: The life and career of Ted Fujita" as an article in its May/June 1999 issue. He was the subject of Mr. Tornado, a documentary film that originally aired on the PBS series American Experience on May 19, 2020.

== Contributions to meteorology ==
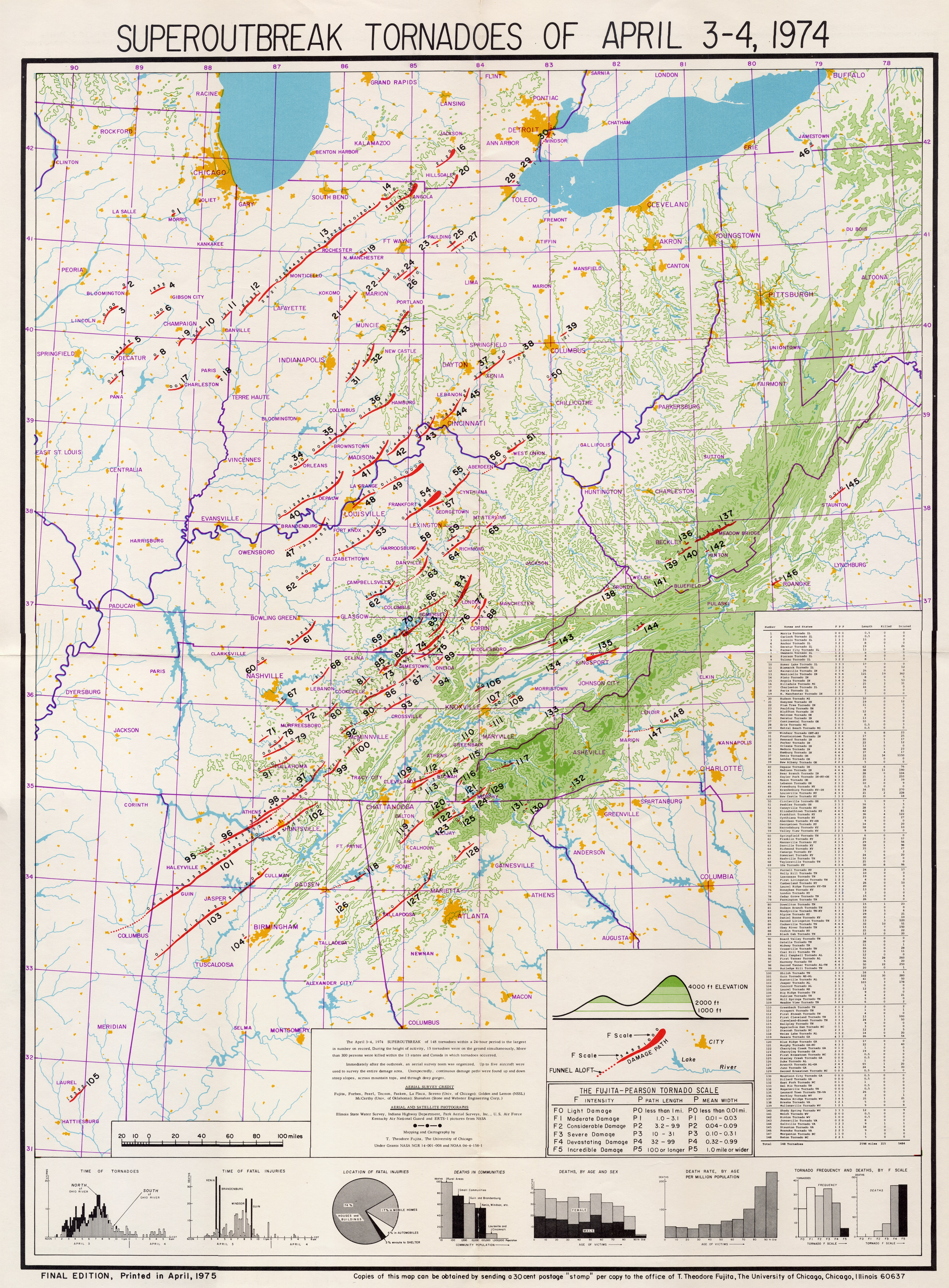
Fujita's track analysis of the 1974 Super Outbreak

Fujita is recognized as the discoverer of downbursts and microbursts and also developed the Fujita scale, which differentiates tornado intensity and links tornado damage with wind speed.

Ted Fujita was also widely known for mastering mesoanalysis of thunderstorm environments, he diagnosed it as a "thunderstorm high". He took aim at Morris Tepper saying quote "The intense system of storms was initiated before a pressure-surge line was organized."

Fujita's best-known contributions were in tornado research; he was often called "Mr. Tornado" by his associates and by the media. Fujita was a pioneer in the development of tornado overflight and damage survey techniques, which he used to study and map the paths of the tornado that hit Lubbock, Texas on May 11, 1970. He established the value of photometric analysis of tornado pictures and films to establish wind speeds at various heights at the surface of tornado vortices. Fujita was also the first to widely study the meteorological phenomenon of the downburst, which can pose serious danger to aircraft. As a result of his work, in particular on Project NIMROD, pilot training worldwide routinely uses techniques he pioneered to provide instruction to students.

Fujita was also largely involved in developing the concept of multiple vortex tornadoes, which feature multiple small funnels (suction vortices) rotating within a larger parent cloud. His work established that, far from being rare events as was previously believed, most powerful tornadoes were composed of multiple vortices. He also advanced the concept of mini-swirls in intensifying tropical cyclones. Ted Fujita also published a model to relate pressure and wind in tropical cyclones. He was the first to modify the exponent in the most common template.

== Sources ==
- — (1 August 1970). "The Lubbock tornadoes: A Study of Suction Spots". Weatherwise. 23 (4): 161–173. Bibcode:1970Weawi..23d.161F. doi:10.1080/00431672.1970.9932888. ISSN 0043-1672.
- Shanahan, J. A., and Fujita, T. T., 1971c. The Lubbock tornadoes and Fujita suction vortices. Presented at October 18–22, 1971, ASCE Annual and National Environmental Engineering meeting, St. Louis. [October 1971]
- — (22 June 1976). Photogrammetric Analysis of Tornadoes - F. History of Suction Vortices. Institute for Disaster Research. Proceedings of the Symposium on Tornadoes: Assessment of Knowledge and Implications for Man. Lubbock, Texas: Texas Tech University. pp. 78–88. hdl:10605/262139.
- Fujita, T. T., and Forbes, G. S., 1976f. Photogrammetric analysis of tornadoes, D. Three scales of motion involving tornadoes, in Peterson, R. E., ed., Proceedings of the Symposium on Tornadoes, Assessment of Knowledge and Implications for Man: Institute for Disaster Research, Texas Technological University, Lubbock, p. 53–57. [June 1976] (also issued as SMRP 140c)
