= 1945 tornado outbreak =

1945 tornado outbreak may refer to:

- Tornadoes of 1945
- Tornado outbreak of February 12, 1945
- Tornado outbreak of April 12, 1945
