= History of tornado research =

A Doppler on Wheels radar loop of a hook echo and associated mesocyclone in Goshen County, Wyoming on June 5, 2009. Strong mesocyclones show up as adjacent areas of yellow and blue (on other radars, bright red and bright green), and usually indicate an imminent or occurring tornado.

The history of tornado research spans back centuries, with the earliest documented tornado occurring in 200 CE and academic studies on them starting in the 18th century. Several people throughout history are known to have researched tornadoes. This is a timeline of government or academic research into tornadoes.

== Early studies ==
The earliest-known tornado occurred in Sardegna, Sardinia and Corsica, Roman Empire (modern-day Italy) in 200.

The earliest-known German tornado struck Freising (modern day Germany) in 788. The earliest-known Irish tornado appeared on April 30, 1054, in Rostella, near Kilbeggan. The earliest-known British tornado hit central London on October 23, 1091, and was especially destructive, with modern research classifying it as an F4 on the Fujita scale.

After the discovery of the New World, tornado documentation expanded into the Americas. On August 21, 1521, an apparent tornado is recorded to have struck Tlatelolco (present day Mexico City), just two days before the Aztec capital's fall to Cortés. Many other tornadoes are documented historically within the Basin of Mexico. The first confirmed tornado in the United States struck Rehoboth, Massachusetts, in August 1671. The first confirmed tornadic death in the United States occurred on July 8, 1680, after a tornado struck Cambridge, Massachusetts.

=== First tornadic case study ===
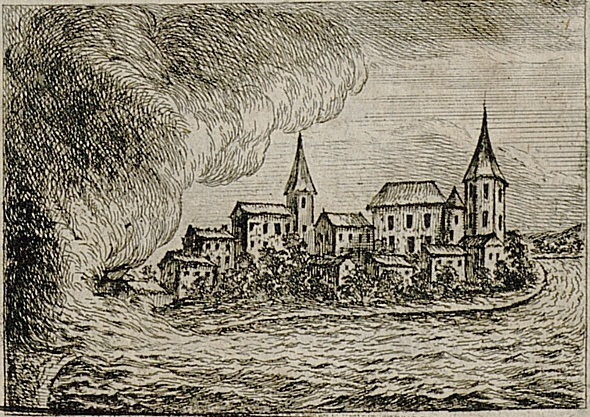
A copper engraving by Gottlob Burchard Genzmer showing the tornado

The first case study on a tornado took place following the violent 1764 Woldegk tornado, which struck around Woldegk, Duchy of Mecklenburg-Strelitz, Holy Roman Empire (modern-day Germany). Between 1764 and 1765, German scientist Gottlob Burchard Genzmer published a detailed survey of the damage path from the tornado. It covers the entire, 33km (18.6mi) long track and also includes eyewitness reports as well as an analysis of the debris and hail fallout areas. Genzmer calls the event an "Orcan" and only compares it to waterspouts or dust devils. Based on the damage survey, modern day meteorologists from the ESSL were able to assign a rating of F5, on the Fujita scale, and T11 on the TORRO scale, making it the earliest known F5 tornado worldwide. The T11 rating on the TORRO scale also places this event among the most violent tornadoes ever documented worldwide.

=== First studies by country ===
In May 1820, Józef Karol Skrodzki, professor at the University of Warsaw, read a paper describing a tornado that occurred in Mazew, Łęczyca County in Poland on August 10, 1819. It was described that the tornado had the appearance of a funnel whose color seemed different depending on the lighting, and that it damaged several buildings by tearing off roofs, damaging the structure, and lifting a hay wagon into the air. The paper was published in a collection of works by the Warsaw Society of Friends of Learning in 1821.

In 1838, the earliest recorded Asian tornado struck near the city of Calcutta in present-day West Bengal, India. It was described as moving remarkably slow across its 16-mile (26 km) path southeast over the span of 2 to 3 hours. It was recorded to cause significant damage to the area, including 3.5-pound (1.6 kg) hail being observed at the Dum Dum weather observatory.

Between 1839 and 1841, a detailed survey of damage path of significant tornado that struck New Brunswick, New Jersey, on June 19, 1835, which was the deadliest tornado in New Jersey history, occurred. The path was surveyed by many scientists on account of its location between New York City and Philadelphia, including early tornado theorists James Pollard Espy and William Charles Redfield. Scientists disagreed whether there was whirling, convergent, or rotational motion. A conclusion that remains accurate today is that the most intense damage tends to be on right side of a tornado (with respect to direction of forward movement), which was found to be generally easterly.

In 1840, the earliest known intensive study of a tornadic event published in Europe, by French scientist Athanase Peltier. In 1865, the first in India and earliest known scientific survey of a tornado that analyzed structure and dynamics was published by Indian scientist Chunder Sikur Chatterjee. The path damage survey of a tornado that occurred at Pundooah (now Pandua), Hugli district, West Bengal, India, was documented on maps and revealed multiple vortices, the tornadocyclone, and direction of rotation, predating work by John Park Finley, Alfred Wegener, Johannes Letzmann, and Ted Fujita.

== Research by topic ==
=== Tornadogenesis ===
Origin of Tornadoes, the theory of tornadogenesis by the United States Weather Bureau in 1898

In December 1898, Dr. B. F. Duke, along with Dr. Cleveland Abbe, published a paper regarding the United States's Weather Bureau's first official theory on how tornadoes form after Duke observed the formation of a tornado near Pascagoula, Mississippi, in April 1894. This theory included that winds have to be moving in two different directions ("northerly and southerly") and that when those winds meet, they form a rapid updraft, which forms a very buoyant cloud. The buoyant cloud then will "suck up the air beneath it with such violence as to form a waterspout over the ocean or a tornado over the land and the winds immediately below it are suddenly and greatly increased". Dr. Abbe then theorized that "it is possible that we may have violent whirls with horizontal axes", for the first theory of horizontal vortices within tornadoes.

In 1960, Bernard Vonnegut suggested that electricity in thunderstorms may power tornadoes.

=== Characteristics of tornadoes ===
In April 1899, Dr. Cleveland Abbe, along with Professor A. W. Baker and E. L. Dinniston, published an article regarding the characteristics of tornadoes. In the study and analysis, Abbe discovered that tornadoes in the United States rotate counterclockwise, just the same as a large low-pressure system. Abbe also stated that this rotation rule for tornadoes "is almost invariable".

In November 1900, S. C. Emery with the United States Weather Bureau conducted a case study, including detailed damage surveys, for a small tornado outbreak in Tennessee, Mississippi and Arkansas on November 19, 1900. In the study, Emery surveyed and mapped that one of the tornadoes "divided" into two nearly parallel parts, or that it had a "zig zag" motion, as some buildings were not damaged and others destroyed. Emery also stated he was "inclined to believe the latter explanation as more reasonable". Emery also noted one of the tornadoes had an average forward speed of 60 mph (97 km/h) and that a separate tornado travelled 215 miles (346 km).

In 1901 and later again in 1906, Frank H. Bigelow, chief of the United States Weather Bureau, calculated and published formulas to find the rotational speed of a tornado based on the height above sea level. In his study, Bigelow studied a waterspout off the coast of Cottage City, Massachusetts. Bigelow's formula went on to help Alfred Wegener, a leading geophysicist, atmospheric scientist, and an Arctic explorer, develop the hypothesis that tornadoes can form off of a gust front.

Bigelow's formula
Height above sea level (ft)	Diameter of tube (ft)	Radial velocity outward (mph)	Rotational velocity (mph)	Vertical velocity upwards (mph)
4,200 ft (1,300 m)	–	–	–	–
4,198 ft (1,280 m)	3,402 ft (1,037 m)	7.0 mph (11.3 km/h)	14.1 mph (22.7 km/h)	0.04 mph (0.064 km/h)
3,901 ft (1,189 m)	506 ft (154 m)	1.0 mph (1.6 km/h)	94.4 mph (151.9 km/h)	2.50 mph (4.02 km/h)
3,599 ft (1,097 m)	400 ft (120 m)	0.6 mph (0.97 km/h)	119.5 mph (192.3 km/h)	3.90 mph (6.28 km/h)
3,301 ft (1,006 m)	290 ft (88 m)	0.6 mph (0.97 km/h)	164.0 mph (263.9 km/h)	7.40 mph (11.91 km/h)
2,999 ft (914 m)	250 ft (76 m)	0.5 mph (0.80 km/h)	189.0 mph (304.2 km/h)	9.90 mph (15.93 km/h)
2,898 ft (883 m)	204 ft (62 m)	0.4 mph (0.64 km/h)	233.0 mph (375.0 km/h)	14.90 mph (23.98 km/h)
1,802 ft (549 m)	178 ft (54 m)	0.4 mph (0.64 km/h)	268.0 mph (431.3 km/h)	19.80 mph (31.87 km/h)
1,499 ft (457 m)	168 ft (51 m)	0.3 mph (0.48 km/h)	284.0 mph (457.1 km/h)	22.20 mph (35.73 km/h)
1,201 ft (366 m)	158 ft (48 m)	0.3 mph (0.48 km/h)	300.0 mph (482.8 km/h)	24.70 mph (39.75 km/h)
601 ft (183 m)	144 ft (44 m)	0.3 mph (0.48 km/h)	328.0 mph (527.9 km/h)	29.60 mph (47.64 km/h)
479 ft (146 m)	144 ft (44 m)	0.3 mph (0.48 km/h)	333.0 mph (535.9 km/h)	29.70 mph (47.80 km/h)
0 ft (0 m)	134 ft (41 m)	0.3 mph (0.48 km/h)	354.0 mph (569.7 km/h)	34.60 mph (55.68 km/h)

The 1957 Dallas tornado was studied extensively by the Severe Weather Forecast Unit (modern day Storm Prediction Center) in Kansas City, who proved several prominent theories about tornadoes were wrong. One of these-then proven false theories was that all air and debris flowed inward into the funnel and then upward, but on the outside edges of the funnel debris and people were even lifted. Among the studies was the first-ever photogrammetric analysis of wind speeds in a tornado. The film of the tornado is still regarded as being of exceptionally high quality and sharpness. Additionally, structural surveys following this and the Fargo tornado later in the year provided data that contributed to the development of the Fujita scale.

During the violent F4 tornado that struck Union City, Oklahoma on May 1973, for the first time the "Tornadic Vortex Signature" (TVS) was identified by the National Severe Storms Laboratory (NSSL). The storm was monitored with an experimental Doppler radar, which confirmed a rotation within the storm before the tornado touched down.

Video of several sub-vortices within the 2013 El Reno tornado

In 2018, researchers with the University of Oklahoma's School of Meteorology (OU SoM), NWS, NSSL, and Ohio University published a detailed analysis of the multiple-vortex nature of the 2013 El Reno, Oklahoma tornado.

=== Tornado watches and warnings ===
In April 1899, the Chicago Tribune wrote to the United States Weather Bureau via a news article posing the question on why tornado warnings are not sent out via telegraphs or even the telephone to warn the local population in the path. Cleveland Abbe responded by saying "it is certain that if any such arrangement were possible, the Weather Bureau would have done this many years ago" along with "we must remember that the destructive areas of tornadoes, and even of thunderstorms, are so small that the chance of being injured is exceedingly slight" and that "we do not attempt to prevent that which is inevitable".

In June 1899, U.S. Weather Bureau Oklahoma section director J. I. Widmeyer published that long-range forecasters in Oklahoma were sounding "unnecessary tornado alarms" due to "ignorant predictions" to residents in Oklahoma and that they were causing "frightened men, women, and children" to take shelter, despite no tornadoes occurring. Cleveland Abbe added on to the publication by Widmeyer saying, "It is unnecessary to resort to the caves and cellars, or to stop our ordinary avocations for fear of a tornado, until we see the cloud in the distance, or are positively certain that one is about to pass near us".

In April 1908, the U.S. Weather Bureau published several replies regarding a question posed to the Weather Bureau on: How can we protect against tornadoes?.

- Lieutenant John Park Finley responded with "the best we can do is to watch the distant tornado, and if it seems to approach us then move away toward the left; so far as we have learned, this still continues to be the best rule".
- The Chief of the Weather Bureau responded with the idea to establish a warning system by surrounding a city at a distance of 4 mi (6.4 km) with wires hooked up with alarms. That way, a warning can be given to the city for an impending tornado. The wire system would detect sudden pressure differences, if wires were twisted, or if wires were short circuited. It was also stated that at a distance of four miles from the city, the tornado "would be unable to reach the city from any direction without giving us an alarm".
- Cleveland Abbe responded by saying the idea of a wire-based system around a city is not practical as well as how tornadoes are very infrequent. Abbe ended by saying that "the mere forewarning of a tornado is no protection against its coming" and that it would be wiser to "spend your money to protect yourself against diseases, accidents, lightning, ect…".

On June 25, 1967, the Royal Netherlands Meteorological Institute (KNMI) issued a weather forecasting calling for tornadoes, which became the first-ever tornado forecast in Europe.

In May 2024, Timothy J. Dolney with Pennsylvania State University, published a new analysis of the 1985 United States–Canada tornado outbreak, specifically focusing on the state of Pennsylvania and Tornado Watch #211 issued by the National Weather Service for the tornado outbreak.

=== Pressure ===
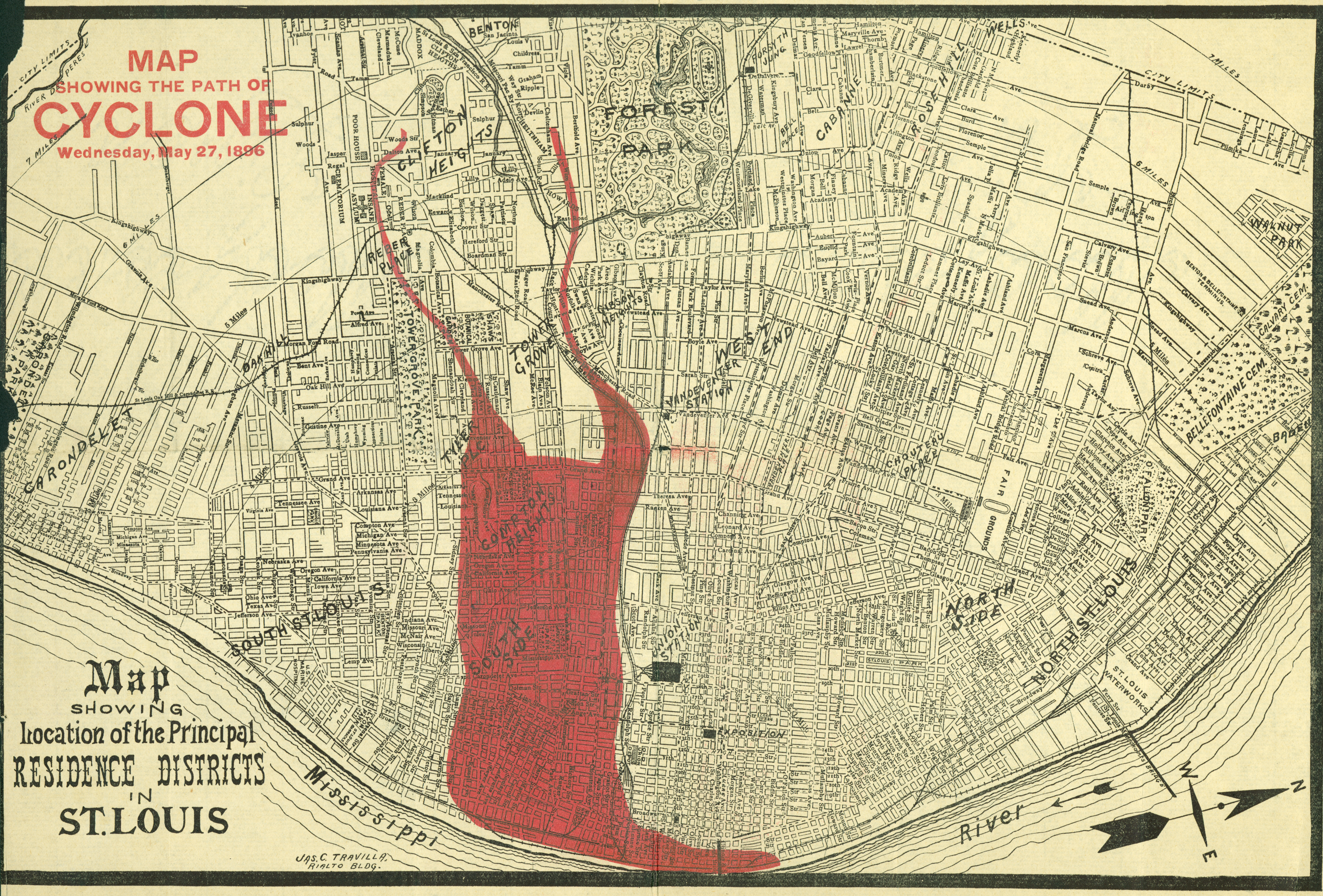
A map of the 1896 St. Louis–East St. Louis tornado‘s damage path by the Missouri History Museum

In 1896, H. C. Frankenfield with the United States Weather Bureau's local forecast office in St. Louis, conducted a case study on the 1896 St. Louis–East St. Louis tornado, which included a damage survey and meteorological analysis of the tornado and associated storm. Following the study by Frankenfield, a special case study was conducted by Julius Baier, a civil engineer in St. Louis to address an estimation made by Frankenfield. In his study, Baier stated that the tornado's center crossed directly over a barometer, which recorded a reading of 671 millimetres of mercury (895 mb). In the study, it was also documented that Baier, along with professor F. E. Nipher, tested the barometer and saw no apparent ways of an inaccurate reading.

On August 14, 2024, researchers with the Pressure Acoustics Research Inside Tornadoes EXperiment (PACRITEX) published research on some of the first pressure measurements and video observations inside three EF2 tornadoes taken by in-situ tornado probes.

- The first deployment of the probe was inside the 2016 Tulsa, Oklahoma tornado. Within two minutes, the pressure dropped from a reading of 985 hPa outside of the tornado to 929 hPa inside the tornado. During those two minutes, the probe recorded three individual spikes, indicating it most likely sampled suction vorticies.
- The second deployment of the probe was the 2019 Burnsville, Mississippi tornado. The probe captured video from inside the tornado, which allowed the researchers to carefully study the inflow and bowl feature of the tornado. During probe deployment, the researchers were directly struck by the tornado. The probe recorded a pressure drop from 990 hPa to 950 hPa and a wind speed measurement of 54.6 metres per second (122 mph; 197 km/h) from ground level inside the tornado.
- The third deployment of the probe was the 2019 McCook, Nebraska tornado. The probe was deployed directly inside the tornado. While inside the tornado, the probe captured 3 separate pressure drop spikes, with over 65 seconds between the second spike and third spike. During the third spike, the probe recorded a pressure of 890 hPa and a wind speed of up to 55 metres per second (120 mph; 200 km/h).

=== Wind speeds ===
In January 1904, Frank P. Chaffee, the director of the United States Weather Bureau office in Montgomery, Alabama, published a case study on a violent tornado which struck Moundville, Alabama, on January 22, 1904. The study included details on wind speed measurements of the tornado, reaching up to 60 miles per hour (97 km/h), taken around Birmingham, Alabama. In July 1904, Albert Ashenberger published a case study on a tornado in Mobile County, Alabama, on May 30, 1904.

In March 1906, Lee A. Denson with the U.S. Weather Bureau published a case study on a tornado which struck Meridian, Mississippi, on March 2, 1906. The center of the tornado passed within 250 yards (230 m) of the local U.S. Weather Bureau office, allowing for pressure, temperature, and wind speed measurements of up to 64 mph (103 km/h) close to the tornado. In May 1906, Andrew Noble along with H. A. Hunt, an Australian Government meteorologist, published a case study on a destructive tornado which struck North Sydney, New South Wales, Australia, on March 27, 1906.

Estimates of Minimum Wind Forces Causing Structural Damage by E.P. Segner Jr.

In September 1958, E.P. Segner Jr. published a case study on the 1957 Dallas tornado. In the analysis, Senger estimated that the tornado had winds at least up to 302 mph (486 km/h), due to the obliteration of a large billboard.

The University of Oklahoma's RaXPol mobile Doppler weather radar, positioned at a nearby overpass, measured winds preliminarily analyzed as in excess of 296 mph (476 km/h). These winds are considered the second-highest ever measured worldwide, just shy of the 302 ± 22 mph (486 ± 35 km/h) recorded during the 1999 Bridge Creek–Moore tornado. The El Reno tornado also had a documented width of 2.6 miles (4.2 km), which the modern-day National Weather Service stated was the widest tornado ever recorded, despite the United States government documenting and publishing about a tornado that was 4 miles (6.4 km) wide in 1946.

=== Political ===
Also in 1896, Norman B. Conger, an inspector with the United States Weather Bureau, conducted and published a case study on the 1896 Thomas, Michigan tornado, based on "all reliable, available sources". Conger's report also contained a map created by E. F. Hulbert. Following the tornado, Michigan governor John T. Rich created a committee to assess the damage and collect further information about the tornado.

In April 2004, the Tornado Research Act of 2004 was introduced by Alabama Representative Bud Cramer, on April 2, 2004, to create a new tornado research branch of the National Oceanic and Atmospheric Administration. The legislation failed and died in committee.

In April 2023, the TORNADO Act was introduced by U.S. Senator Roger Wicker as well as eight other senators from the 118th United States Congress.

In April 2023, the 118th United States House of Representatives passed the Weather Research and Forecasting Innovation Reauthorization Act of 2023, also known as the Weather Act Reauthorization Act of 2023, sending it to the United States Senate. The bill is set to provide authority for the Verification of the Origins of Rotation in Tornadoes Experiment (VORTEX-USA) by the National Oceanic and Atmospheric Administration.

In July 2024, Independent United States Senator Kyrsten Sinema, along with other Democratic and Republican Senators, introduced the Border Weather Resiliency Act of 2024 to the United States Senate. Days later, United States Congressman Randy Feenstra along with three other congressman introduced a bill (H.R.9081) to the United States House of Representatives to provide tax relief to people affected by severe storms, flooding, and tornadoes.

=== Frequency and locations ===
In June 1897, Cleveland Abbe, a PhD meteorologist and professor at Columbian University, published one of the first tornadic frequency tables for each state in the United States, which included the annual average per state as well as the average per 10,000 square miles (26,000 km^{2}). In the table, it was noted that Kansas was the leading state for tornadoes, with an annual average of 6.38 tornadoes, followed by Illinois with an annual average of 4.94 tornadoes. The only states documented with an annual average of 0 tornadoes was Alaska, Delaware, Idaho, Oregon, Rhode Island, Utah, and Washington. In July 1897, M. C. Walsh with the La Salle Institute reported the beginning of the 1896 St. Louis–East St. Louis tornado's track, which included a description of "two long, heavy black masses of cloud, one moving from the southwest, the other curving from the northeast" with them meeting "at a height of about 1,000 feet (330 yd; 300 m)".

In April 1899, Abbe published an article along with the Iowa State Register and Iowa Weather and Crop Service, stated the number of tornadoes across the United States was not truly increasing and that any numeric increase in tornado count was strictly due to the increase of newspaper and telegraph coverage in the United States. It was also stated that tornadoes are now documented almost entirely within 24-hours, so no meteorological phenomenon is causing an increase in tornado counts. Abbe also stated anything to the contrary was a "popular mistake".

In April 2024, Timothy A. Coleman, with the University of Alabama in Huntsville (UAH), Richard L. Thompson with the NOAA Storm Prediction Center, and Dr. Gregory S. Forbes, a retired meteorologist from The Weather Channel published an article to the Journal of Applied Meteorology and Climatology stating, "it is apparent that the perceived shift in tornado activity from the traditional tornado alley in the Great Plains to the eastern U.S. is indeed real".

In June 2024, researchers with the University of Illinois published a paper on various regional and seasonal trends of tornadoes across the United States.

=== Sound ===
In February 1898, J. J. O'Donnell, an observer for the United States Weather Bureau, published a detailed meteorological case study and damage analysis on a violent tornado which struck Fort Smith, Arkansas, on January 11–12, 1898. Prior to being struck by the tornado, O'Donnell observed a barometer which read a pressure of 28.846 inches of mercury (976.8 mb). O'Donnell also recorded the order-of-sequence of what an approaching tornado sounds like: "a gurgling noise...like water rushing rushing out of a bottle, followed immediately by a rumbling, such as that made by a number of heavy carriages rolling rapidly over a cobblestone pavement, and finally like a railroad train." O'Donnell later stated these three sounds, in sequence is the "tornado roar". This sequence of sounds documented by O'Donnell, particularly the sound of a train, is the described sound of a tornado by people, even in the 21st century.

In May 2024, Doctor Bin Liang with the University of Mississippi published a paper on the results of a field research project on tornadoes. During the project, Liang was able to determine "that tornadoes emit dominant low-frequency infrasound between 0.5−1.2 Hertz", after examining tornadic and non-tornadic supercells.

=== Psychological ===
In April 1907, WM. F. Reed Jr., an observer with the U.S. Weather Bureau, along with J. H. Patterson, J. R. Steward, and J. P. Harrison, published a case study on a tornado which struck Escambia County, Florida on April 5, 1907. The case study involved first hand accounts from survivors, some of whom were thrown by the tornado, along with a complete damage survey.

In February 2024, researchers with the University of Tennessee and University of Missouri published an academic study about how survivors from the 2011 Joplin tornado recover from "Tornado Brain", a new term for the PTSD of tornado survivors.

In July 2024, Jennifer M. First with the University of Missouri, published a paper examining the aftermath of the 2020 Nashville tornado, focusing on the mental health issues of survivors and the gender-based recovery difference.

=== Media ===
==== Photographs ====
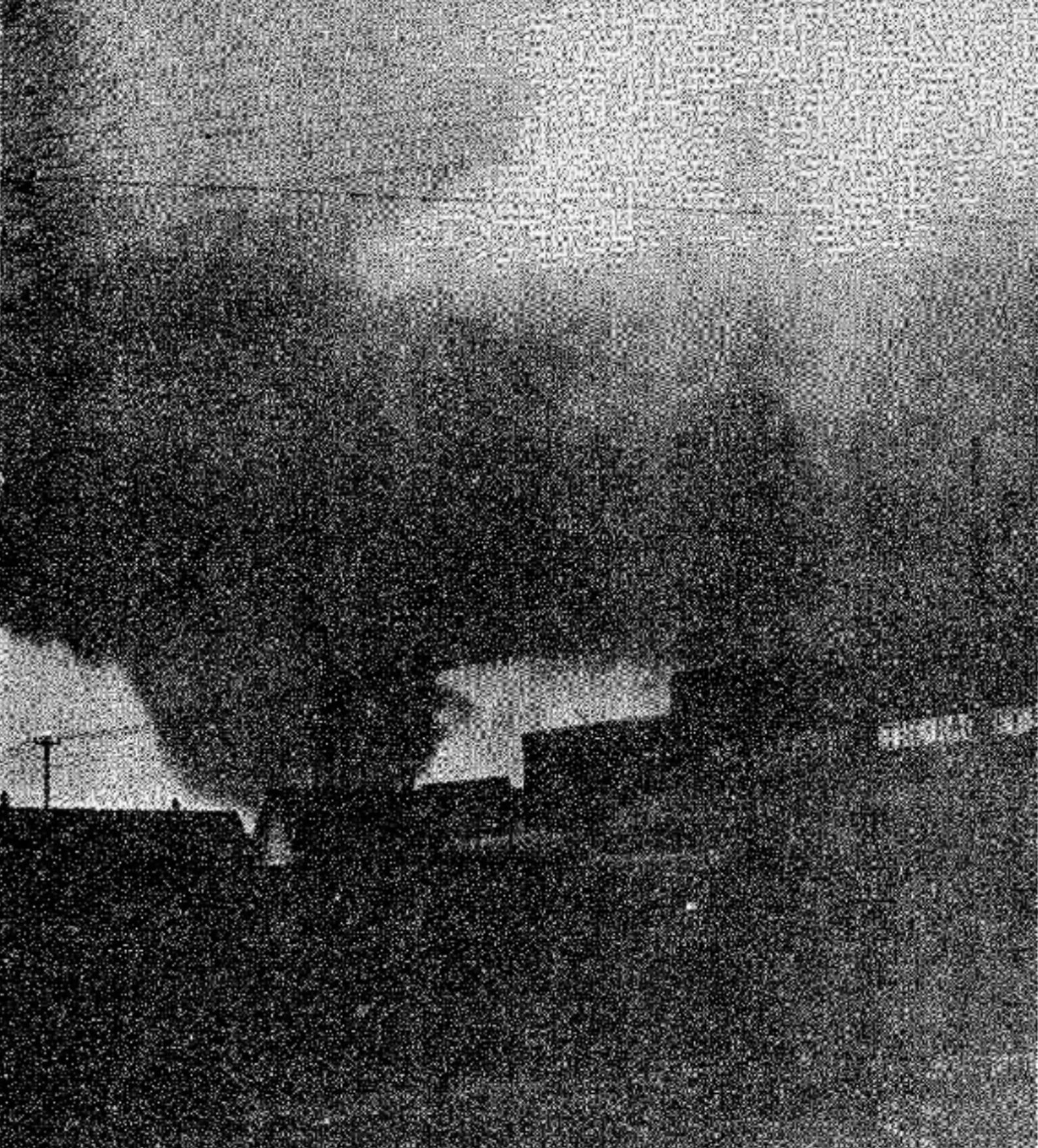
A photograph taken 500 yards (460 m) away from a tornado near Wills Point, Texas

In June 1907, the U.S. Weather Bureau published a complete damage survey and analysis on a strong tornado which struck Wills Point, Texas on May 25, 1907. The analysis included some of the first-ever photographs of a tornado, taken by George Alford; one taken 500 yd (460 m) and the other taken 3 miles (4.8 km) away from the tornado.

==== Films ====
On July 19, 2024, the hit disaster-film Twisters released, which included accurate scientific theories on ways to potentially disrupt tornadoes.

=== Tornado outbreak and tornado family studies ===
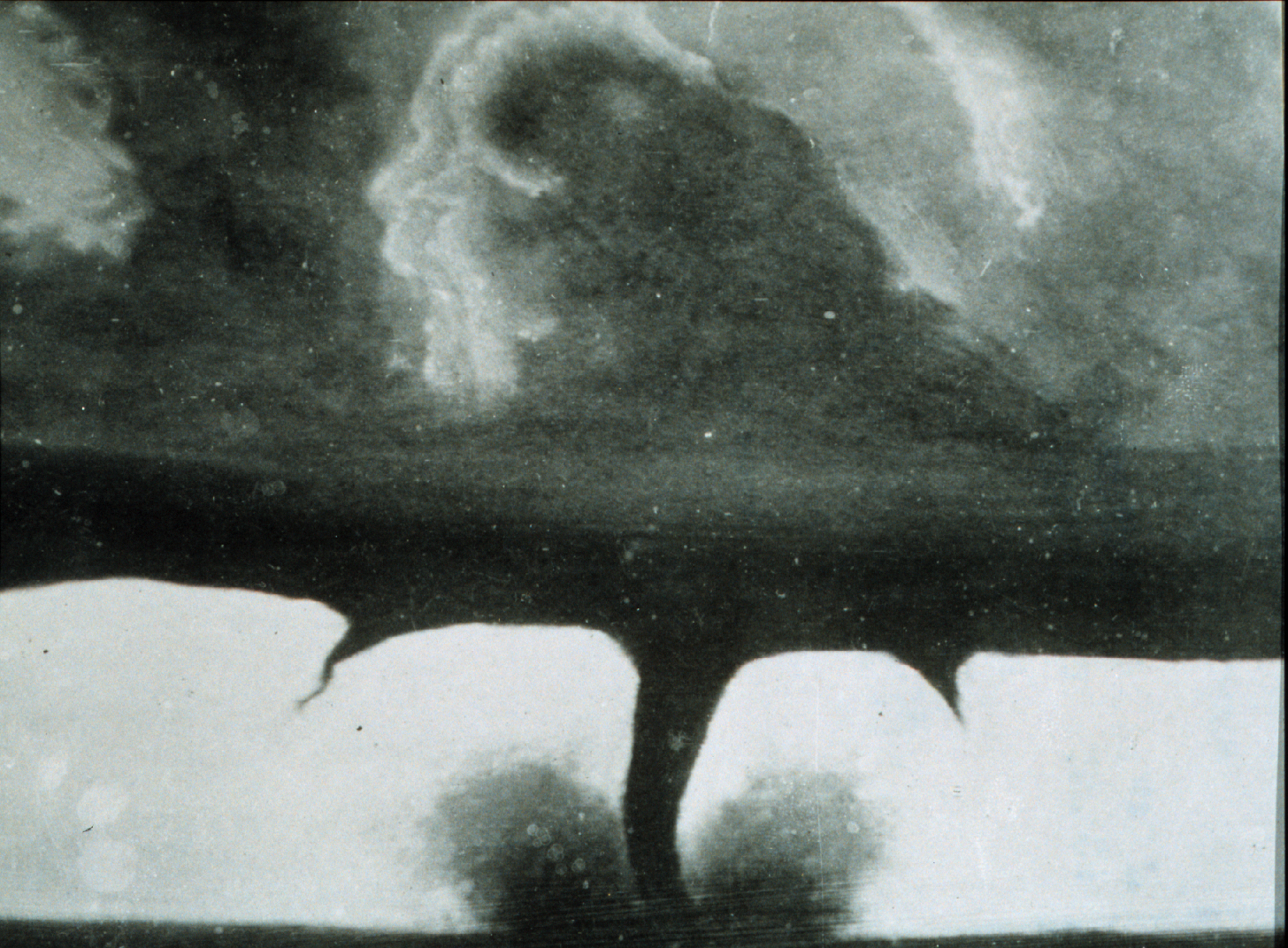
One of the oldest photographs of an active tornado, taken near Howard, South Dakota on 28 August 1884

In 1886, Lieutenant Jno. J. P. Finley in the United States Army Signal Corps, under official orders from the United States military, wrote a case study on a tornado outbreak which occurred between September 12–18, 1886. Finley studied 26 tornadoes which occurred during the outbreak.

In 1895, D. Fisher with the United States Weather Bureau (USWB) published a case study on a tornado which struck Augusta, Georgia, on March 20, 1895, along with a twin tornado and a satellite tornado, which also struck Augusta. Two months later, the United States Weather Bureau conducted a short case study on the tornado outbreak of May 3, 1895, tracking each of the 18 tornadoes that occurred during the outbreak.

In May 1898, Willis L. Moore, the chief of the United States Weather Bureau, created a map, which was later published by an order from the United States Secretary of Agriculture, of meteorological observations across the United States as well as the tracks of tornadoes which occurred on May 17, 1898.

Between April 3–4, 1974, a catastrophic Super Outbreak occurred across the United States, which produced 148 tornadoes in a 24-hour period and led to the deaths of 335 people. The 1974 Super Outbreak was extensively studied by Ted Fujita along with other researchers. Following the outbreak, Fujita and a team of colleagues from the University of Chicago, University of Oklahoma, and National Severe Storms Laboratory, undertook a 10-month study of the 1974 Super Outbreak. Along with discovering new knowledge about tornadoes, such as downbursts and microbursts, and assessing damage to surrounding structures, the violent tornado which struck Xenia, Ohio, was determined to be the worst out of 148 storms.

In 1993, Thomas P. Grazulis, head of The Tornado Project and regarded tornado expert, published Significant Tornadoes 1680–1991 in which, he documented all known significant tornadoes, which he considered F2–F5 intensity or one that caused a death, in the United States going back to 1680. He also retroactively rated significant tornadoes in the United States going back to 1880. This book, also called the "de facto bible of U.S. tornado history" is widely cited by meteorologists, historians, and by the United States government.

In April 2011, the Super Outbreak, the largest and costliest tornado outbreak ever to occur, produced 360 tornadoes across the Midwestern, Southern, and Northeastern United States, leading to dozens of academic studies. On May 22, 2011, a violent EF5 tornado impacted Joplin, Missouri, killing 158 people, becoming the deadliest modern-day tornado in history.

In November 2023, American meteorologist and tornado expert Thomas P. Grazulis published Significant Tornadoes 1974–2022, which includes the outbreak intensity score (OIS), a new way to classify and rank tornado outbreaks.

In January 2024, researchers with Colorado State University’s Department of Atmospheric Science, published an analysis and database of 74 tornadoes which occurred in South America. According to the researchers, this was the first time tornadic environments were studied across South America.

In June 2024, researchers with the University of Miami’s CIMAS’s, the Atlantic Oceanographic and Meteorological Laboratory, the University of California, the Jet Propulsion Laboratory, and Mississippi State University published a paper regarding how a prolonged and unusual Pacific–North American pattern contributed to the formation of the tornado outbreak of December 10–11, 2021 and the infamous Quad-State Supercell.

In July 2024, scientists and historians from the University of Maryland, College Park, Storm Prediction Center, National Weather Service Norman, Oklahoma, Stanford University, and the University of Oklahoma's School of Meteorology, Center for Analysis and Prediction of Storms, and Advanced Radar Research Center, published information on a new database, called Tornado Archive, which contains information on more than 100,000 tornadoes. Also in July 2024, Andrew Mercer, Kenneth Swan, and Adonte Knight with Mississippi State University published the first quantitative definition for how to define a tornado outbreak. The researchers also analyzed intensity and frequency trends of tornado outbreaks between 1960 and 2021. In their analysis, it was determined that between 1960 and 2021, the United States experienced 6,723 individual tornado outbreaks and that there is also a downward trend of 0.25 tornado outbreaks per year.

In September 2024, researchers published a study with the American Meteorological Society regarding the various environmental conditions associated with long-track tornadoes (defined as a path length of at least 30 mi (48 km)), including, but not only, the 2021 Tri-State EF4 tornado, the 2021 Western Kentucky EF4 tornado, the 2021 Kenton–Dresden, Tennessee/Pembroke, Kentucky EF3 tornado, and the Barneveld–Black Earth F5 tornado.

=== Intensity and rating of tornadoes ===
A diagram illustrating the relationship between the Beaufort, Fujita, and Mach number scales.

In 1971, Ted Fujita, with the University of Chicago, in collaboration with Allen Pearson, head of the National Severe Storms Forecast Center/NSSFC (currently the Storm Prediction Center/SPC), introduced the Fujita scale as a way to estimate a tornado's intensity. Following the scale's introduction, tornadoes across the United States were retroactively rated on the scale going back to 1950, and the National Oceanic and Atmospheric Administration (NOAA) formally adopted the scale. The scale was updated in 1973, taking into account path length and width, becoming the modern-day Fujita scale. Ted Fujita rated tornadoes from 1916 to 1992, however, pre-1949 rating were not formally accepted by the U.S. government.

Fujita initially assigned the 1974 Xenia tornado a preliminary rating of F6 intensity ± 1 on the Fujita scale, before stating F6 ratings were "inconceivable".

In 2002, a Service Assessment Team was formed by the United States government to assess the quality of forecasts and post-tornado assessments conducted by the National Weather Service (NWS) office in Baltimore/Washington for the 2002 La Plata tornado. Their assessment and findings, released in September 2002, found that the local NWS office failed to indicate the initial findings of F5 damage on the Fujita scale was "preliminary" to the media and public. The Service Assessment Team also recommended the National Oceanic and Atmospheric Administration require local National Weather Service offices to only release "potentially greater than F3" if F4 or F5 damage was suspected and to only release information regarding F4 or F5 damage after Quick Response Team (QRT) had assessed the damage. Following the report, the National Weather Service created a national Quick Response Team (QRT), whose job is to assess and analyze locations believed to have sustained F4 or F5 damage on the Fujita scale.

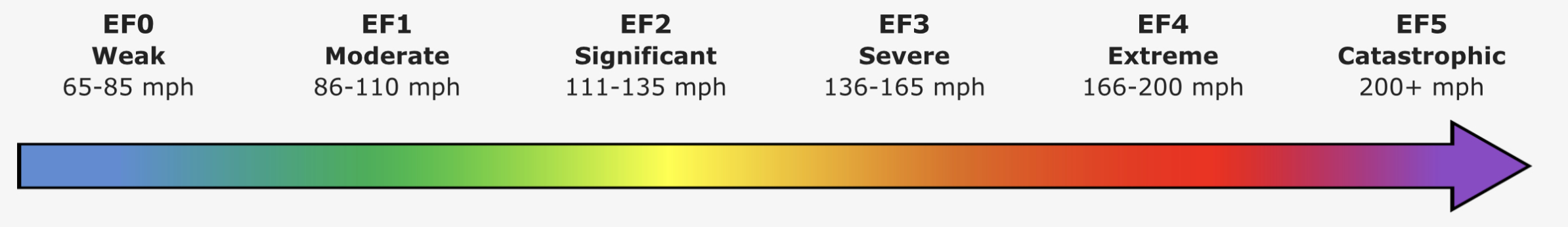
The National Weather Service's arrow showing the EF scale, which includes a description word for each level of the scale

In February 2007, the Enhanced Fujita scale was formally released and put into use across the United States, replacing the Fujita scale. In May, the 2007 Greensburg tornado family occurred, producing a tornado family of 22 tornadoes, including the first tornado to receive the rating of EF5 on the Enhanced Fujita scale; the 2007 Greensburg tornado.

In April 2013, Environment Canada (EC) adopted a variation of the Enhanced Fujita scale (CEF-scale), replacing the Fujita scale across Canada.

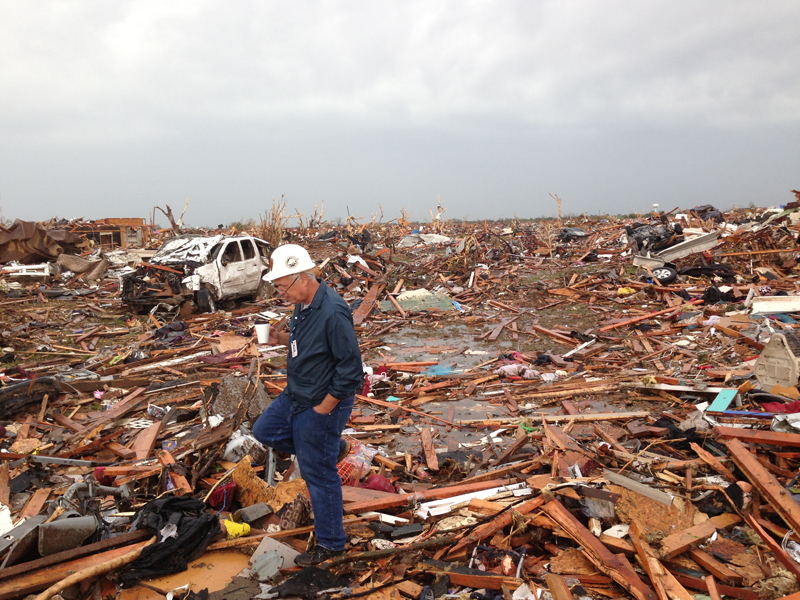
Meteorologist, structural and forensic engineer Timothy P. Marshall surveys a neighborhood that was devastated by the 2013 Moore tornado

In May, a violent EF5 tornado impacted Moore, Oklahoma, which would be the last tornado to receive the rating of EF5 on the Enhanced Fujita scale until 2025. A few days later, a violent tornado impacted areas around El Reno, Oklahoma.

In 2015, the European Severe Storms Laboratory along with the Max Planck Institute for Nuclear Physics published a detailed assessment of the 1764 Woldegk tornado, in which it was assigned a rating of F5 on the Fujita scale, marking the oldest official F5 tornado.

In 2021, Nate DeSpain, with the University of Louisville and Tom Reaugh, with the National Weather Service, published a detailed damage survey and analysis of the 1890 Louisville tornado, where it was rated F4 on the Fujita scale.

In May 2019, a large EF4 tornado affected the western Kansas City metropolitan area. South of the city of Lawrence, Kansas, a storm chasing research team, led by Reed Timmer, launched a custom-built meteorological rocket probe from a specialized interceptor vehicle into the inflow region of the tornado. The rocket was lofted at a maximum height of 11,914 m (39,088 ft) above sea level, into the upper troposphere before descending back down. The tornado was officially rated as low-end EF4 with corresponding winds of 170 mph (270 km/h). The research team caught instantaneous winds of 85.1 m/s (306 km/h; 190 mph), suggesting higher intensity than rated. Reed Timmer and accompanying storm chasers, became the first ever people to document intensity through the method of launching a rocket probe into a tornado.

In March 2022, the National Weather Service published a new damage survey and analysis for the 2012 Henryville tornado, where a "possible EF5 damage" location is identified and discussed.

In July 2022, a research team, from the University of Oklahoma, National Severe Storms Laboratory, and University of Alabama in Huntsville was funded by the National Oceanic and Atmospheric Administration to investigate a stretch 8.7 miles (14 km) of the 2019 Greenwood Springs, Mississippi EF2 tornado where the National Weather Service was unable to survey. In their survey, published in Monthly Weather Review, they note that the tornado "produced forest devastation and electrical infrastructure damage up to at least EF4 intensity" and conclude by writing that "the Greenwood Springs event was a violent tornado, potentially even EF5 intensity."

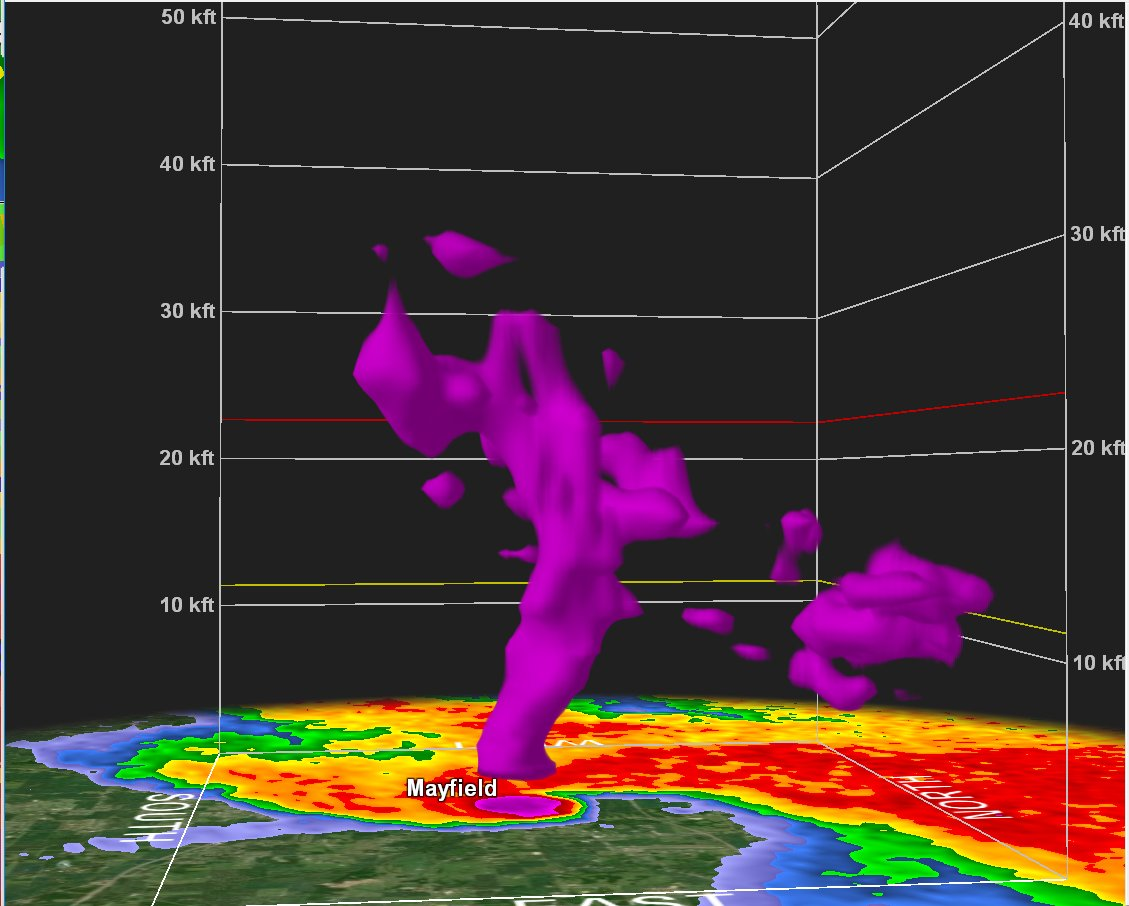
Radar 3D volume scan of the 2021 Western Kentucky tornado showing debris lofted over 30,000 feet (9.1 km) in the air as the tornado struck Mayfield, Kentucky

In 2022, Timothy Marshall, a meteorologist, structural and forensic engineer; Zachary B. Wienhoff, with Haag Engineering Company; Christine L. Wielgos, a meteorologist at the National Weather Service of Paducah; and Brian E. Smith, a meteorologist at the National Weather Service of Omaha, published a detailed damage survey and analysis of the 2021 Western Kentucky EF4 tornado. In their conclusion, the researchers state, "the tornado damage rating might have been higher had more wind resistant structures been encountered. Also, the fast forward speed of the tornado had little 'dwell' time of strong winds over a building and thus, the damage likely would have been more severe if the tornado were slower."

In July 2023, the International Fujita scale (IF-scale) was officially published. In April 2024, the European Severe Storms Laboratory and the Czech Hydrometeorological Institute, along with seven other European organizations, published the first-ever detailed damage survey and analysis on the 2021 South Moravia tornado using the International Fujita scale.

In March 2024, Anthony W. Lyza, Matthew D. Flournoy, and A. Addison Alford, researchers with the National Severe Storms Laboratory, Storm Prediction Center, CIWRO, and the University of Oklahoma's School of Meteorology, published a paper where they stated, ">20% of supercell tornadoes may be capable of producing EF4–EF5 damage" and that "the legacy F-scale wind speed ranges may ultimately provide a better estimate of peak tornado wind speeds at 10–15 m AGL for strong–violent tornadoes and a better damage-based intensity rating for all tornadoes". In their conclusion, the researchers also posed the question: "Does a 0–5 ranking scale make sense given the current state of understanding of the low-level tornado wind profile and engineering of structures?"

In May 2024, researchers with the University of Western Ontario's Northern Tornado Project and engineering department conducted a case study on the 2018 Alonsa EF4 tornado, the 2020 Scarth EF3 tornado, and the 2023 Didsbury EF4 tornado. In their case study, the researchers assessed extreme damage caused by the tornado which is ineligible for ratings on the Canadian Enhanced Fujita scale or the American Enhanced Fujita scale (EF-scale). In their analysis, it was determined all three tornadoes caused damage well-beyond their assigned EF-scale ratings, with all three tornadoes having EF5-intensity winds; Alonsa with 127 metres per second (280 mph; 460 km/h), Scarth with 110–119 metres per second (250–270 mph; 400–430 km/h), and Didsbury with 119 metres per second (270 mph; 430 km/h). At the end of the analysis, the researchers stated, "the lofting wind speeds given by this model are much higher than the rating based on the ground survey EF-scale assessment. This may be due to the current tendency to bias strong EF5 tornadoes lower than reality, or limitations in conventional EF-scale assessments".

On May 21, 2024, a violent EF4 tornado struck the town of Greenfield, Iowa. As the tornado moved through the town, a Doppler on Wheels measured winds of at least >250 mph (400 km/h), "possibly as high as 290 mph (470 km/h)" at 48 yards (44 m) above the surface. Pieter Groenemeijer, the director of the European Severe Storms Laboratory, noted that "on the IF-scale, 250 mph measured below 60 m above ground level is IF4 on the IF-scale, 290 mph is IF5." The peak wind speed estimate was revised to between 309 mph (497 km/h) and 318 mph (512 km/h), a figure "among the highest wind speeds ever determined using DOW data", on June 22, 2024.

=== Forecast models ===
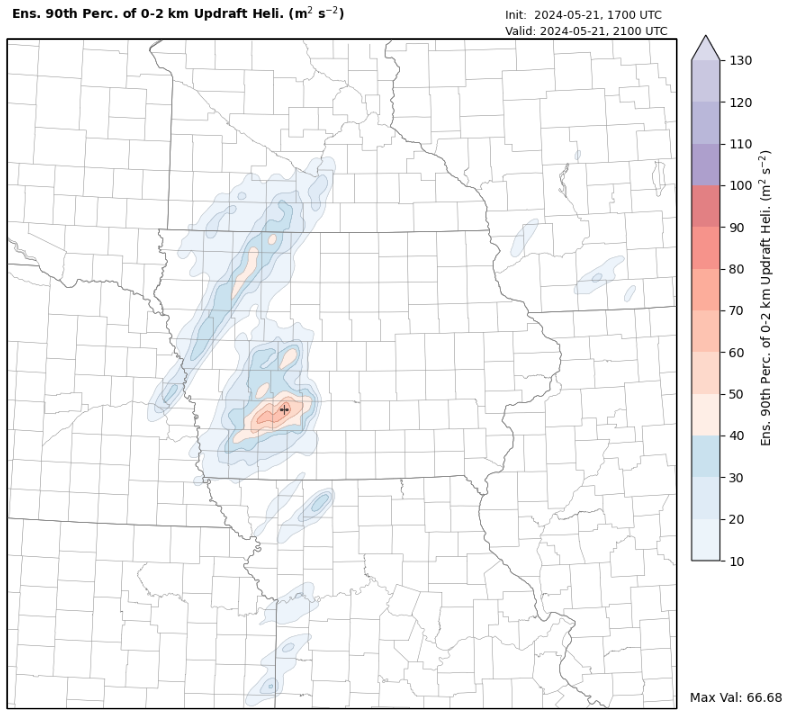
The Warn-on-Forecast run at 17z on May 21, 2024, showing a high probability of low-level updraft helicity near Adair County three hours before the Greenfield tornado formed

A few weeks after the 2024 Greenfield tornado, the National Oceanic and Atmospheric Administration released details about an experimental warning system which was tested before and during the tornado. This new warning system, named Warn-on-Forecast System (WoFS), was created by the Hazardous Weather Testbed housed in the National Weather Center in Norman, Oklahoma. During the experiment and test, the WoFS gave a high indication of “near-ground rotation” in and around the area of Greenfield, Iowa between 2-4 p.m. According to the press release, 75-minutes later, the violent EF4 tornado touched down. Scientists with the National Severe Storms Laboratory were able to give local National Weather Service forecasters a 75-minute lead time for the tornado.

=== Field research projects ===
Between 2019 and 2023, the Targeted Observation by Radars and UAS of Supercells (TORUS) project, led by the University of Nebraska–Lincoln, along with the NOAA NSSL, NOAA Office of Marine and Aviation Operations (OMAO), CIWRO, and Texas Tech University, and the University of Colorado Boulder, occurs.

Between March 2022 and April 2023, the Propagation, Evolution, and Rotation in Linear Storms (PERiLS) Project occurred. The project involved over a hundred people from sixteen organizations and was described as "the largest and most ambitious study focused on improving [the] understanding of tornadoes associated with linear storms." The PERiLS Project was funded by two grants from the National Science Foundation, three grants from the NOAA's VORTEX-USA program, and a grant from the United States Department of Commerce.

Between December 2023 – April 2024, the Detecting and Evaluating Low-level Tornado Attributes (DELTA) project, led by NOAA, along with the National Severe Storms Laboratory and several research universities, occurred.

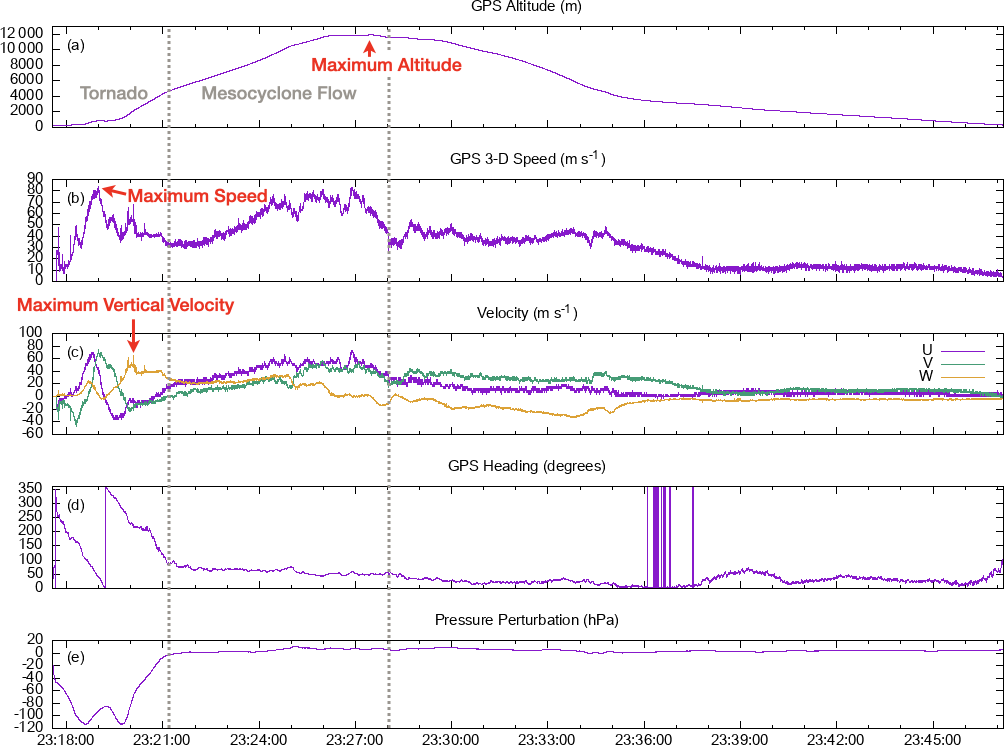
Data from the rocket probe

On February 8, 2024, meteorologist and storm chaser Reed Timmer, along with Mark Simpson, Sean Schofer, Curtis Brooks, published a paper about the design of and information about a new meteorological rocket probe which can be launched into tornadoes. The researchers launched one of these rocket probes into the 2019 Linwood EF4 tornado. The probe recorded winds of 85.1 m/s (190 mph; 306 km/h) during its first rotation around the tornado and also recorded a pressure drop of 113.5 hPa (113.5 mb) inside the tornado. The probe also recorded that the tornado's updraft was 65.0 m/s (145 mph; 234 km/h). The tornado threw the probe 32 mi (51 km), where the researchers were able to recover it.

In mid-April 2024, the National Severe Storms Laboratory along with Texas Tech University began the Low-Level Internal Flows in Tornadoes (LIFT) Project, with the goal to collect data from the "damage layer" of tornadoes; from ground level to 20 m (22 yd) above the surface. The LIFT project deployed 11 times between April–June, gathering data from "numerous successful intercepts".

=== Engineering ===
In February 2024, researchers with Auburn University (AU), Florida International University (FIU), Pennsylvania State University (Penn State), Louisiana State University (LSU), University of South Alabama, University of Illinois Urbana-Champaign (UIUC), University of Kentucky, and CoreLogic, published an academic case study on how hurricane-resistant houses performed during the 2022 Arabi–New Orleans EF3 tornado.

=== Other events or research ===
In July 1899, O. G. Libby, a professor at the University of Wisconsin–Madison, conducted a case study on a violent tornado, which struck New Richmond, Wisconsin, on June 12, 1899. Abbe later added onto the work by Libby in the final publication as well.

In May 1902, S. C. Emery with the United States Weather Bureau published a case study and damage survey for a 118 mi (190 km)-long tornado which struck northeastern Mississippi and northwestern Alabama on March 28, 1902.

In June 1903, J. B. Marbury, the director of the United States Weather Bureau office in Atlanta, Georgia, published a case study on a tornado which struck Gainesville, Georgia, on June 1, 1903. Marbury stated the tornado itself had a "characteristic greenish hue" and that it was "one of the most destructive tornadoes in the history of Georgia".

In August 1905, C. M. Strong, the director of the United States Weather Bureau office in Oklahoma published a detailed case study for a damage survey of the violent and deadly 1905 Snyder, Oklahoma tornado, which occurred on May 10, 1905.

In June 1908, D. S. Landis, an observer with the U.S. Weather Bureau, published a detailed case study, specifically on the complete description and timeline of a tornado near Fort Worth, Texas on May 29, 1908.

On March 18, 1925, the violent Tri-State tornado occurred, killing 695 people and injuring 2,027 people, while traveling 219 miles (352 km) over a period of 3 hours and 45 minutes. At one point, the tornado was moving with a forward speed of 73 miles per hour (117 km/h), setting the record as the fastest forward moving violent tornado in history. The tornado also became the deadliest tornado in United States history as well as the longest traveled tornado in history. All of these records have led the Tri-State tornado to be extensively surveyed and analyzed by academic researchers.

Between 1945 and 1946, Floyd C. Pate, a forecaster at the United States Weather Bureau office in Montgomery, Alabama, undertook an extensive survey and assessment of the tornado outbreak of February 12, 1945, and the 1945 Montgomery–Chisholm tornado. Pate later would describe the Montgomery–Chisholm tornado as "the most officially observed one in history", as it passed 2 miles (3.2 km) away from four different government weather stations, including the U.S. Weather Bureau office in Montgomery.

In August 2008, Timothy P. Marshall, a meteorologist and structural and forensic engineer with Haag Engineering, Karl A. Jungbluth with the National Weather Service, and Abigail Baca with RMS Consulting Group, published a detailed damage survey and analysis for the 2008 Parkersburg–New Hartford tornado. In October, Matthew R. Clark with the United Kingdom's Met Office published a case study on a tornadic storm in southern England on December 30, 2006.

In April 2014, meteorologist, structural and forensic engineer Timothy P. Marshall, along with the National Weather Service (NWS) and Texas Tech University's National Wind Institute, published a detailed damage survey and analysis of the 2014 Mayflower–Vilonia, Arkansas EF4 tornado. In October, researchers with the Cooperative Institute for Severe and High-Impact Weather Research and Operations (CIWRO), NWS, National Severe Storms Laboratory (NSSL), and Timothy P. Marshall with Haag Engineering, published a detailed damage survey and analysis on the 2013 Moore, Oklahoma EF5 tornado. During the same month, researchers at Lyndon State College and the University of Colorado Boulder published a damage and radar analysis of the 2013 Moore tornado.

In May 2020, researchers at Howard University, the Cooperative Science Center for Atmospheric Sciences and Meteorology, and the National Center for Atmospheric Research (NCAR), published a detailed damage survey and analysis on the 2011 Tuscaloosa–Birmingham EF4 tornado.

In January 2023, the 2023 Pasadena–Deer Park tornado prompts the National Weather Service forecasting office in Houston to issue a rare tornado emergency, the first ever issued by the office.

In September 2023, the National Weather Service offices in Jackson, Mississippi, and Nashville, Tennessee, along with the National Severe Storms Laboratory (NSSL) and the University of Oklahoma's CIWRO publish a joint damage survey and analysis on the 2023 Rolling Fork–Silver City EF4 tornado, the 2023 Black Hawk–Winona EF3 tornado, and the 2023 New Wren–Amory EF3 tornado.

In February 2024, researchers with the Tornado and Storm Research Organisation (TORRO), Met Office, and Jersey Met, published a case study on the storm which produced an intense tornado and a hailstorm on the island nation of Jersey in November 2023.

In August 2024, researchers with Central Michigan University, the University of Nebraska–Lincoln, the National Weather Service and the Polish Adam Mickiewicz University published an investigation into "230 significant tornadoes, 246 significant hail events, and 191 null cases across the United States" and how cell mergers, boundaries, other supercells, along with other meteorological phenomenon interact and what impacts do they have on tornadoes and significant hail. During August 2024, researchers with the University of Alabama also published a paper on how tornadoes devastated the tsuga canadensis, commonly known as eastern hemlock, in part of Alabama.

== See also ==
- Timeline of meteorology
  - Meteorology in the 21st century
- List of tornadoes observed by mobile radars
