= Tornado outbreak of April 12, 1945 =

Tornado outbreak in the United States

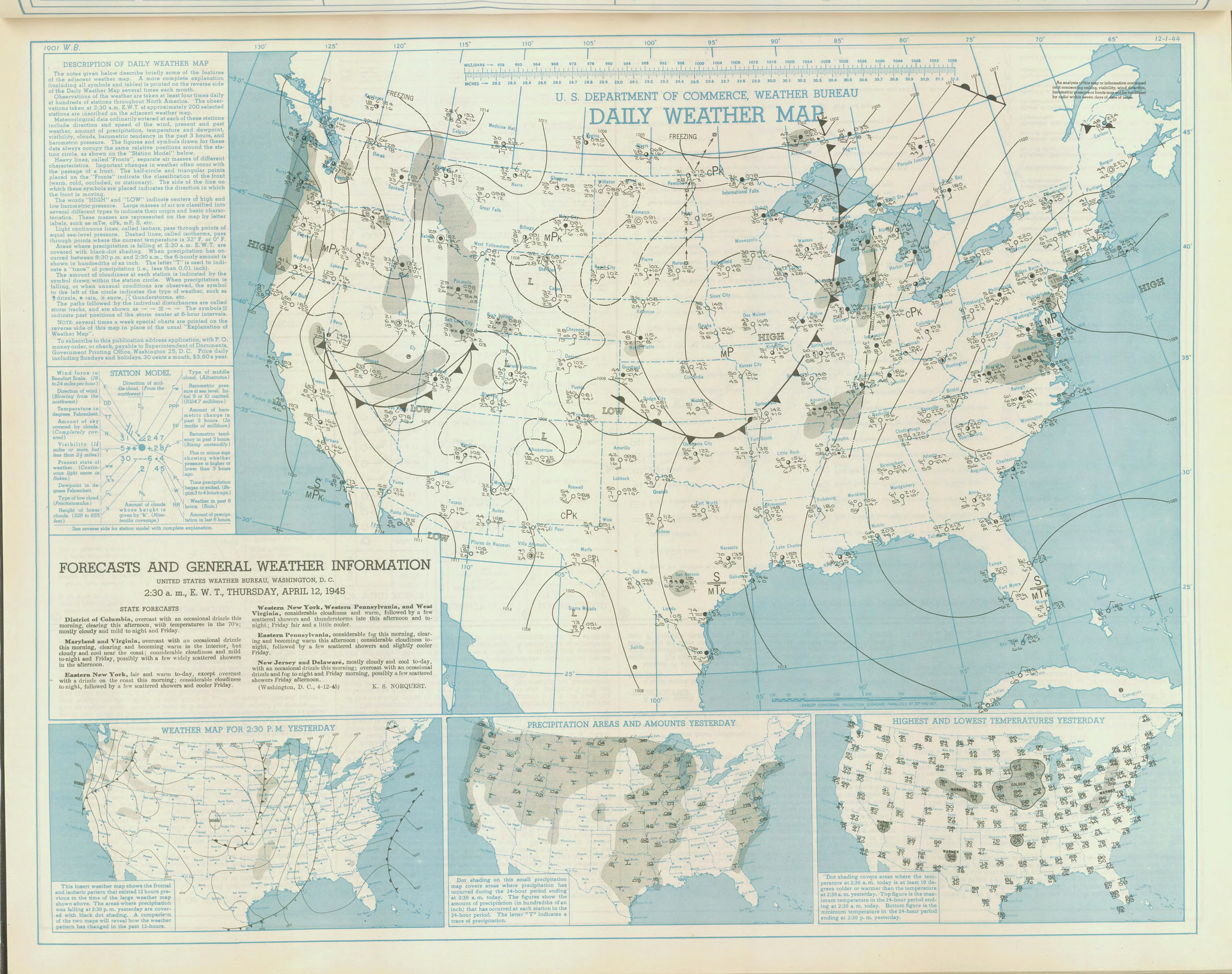
- The Daily Weather Map for April 12, 1945, issued at 2:30 a.m. EST.

Meteorological history
- Duration: April 12, 1945

Tornado outbreak
- Tornadoes: ≥ 17
- Max. rating: F5 tornado
- Duration: 6.5 hours
- Highest winds: 261–318 miles per hour (420–512 km/h)

Overall effects
- Casualties: 128 fatalities (+17 indirect), 1,001 injuries
- Damage: $7.63 million (1945 USD) ($124 million in 2022)
- Areas affected: Midwestern United States
- Part of the tornado outbreaks of 1945

On April 12, 1945, a tornado outbreak occurred in the Midwestern United States, producing numerous strong tornadoes and killing at least 128 people and injuring over 1,000 others; however, the concurrent death of President Franklin D. Roosevelt overshadowed news of the outbreak. On July 5, 1945, the United States Weather Bureau documented this entire outbreak as a single wind event, not a tornado or series of tornadoes, which killed 119 people and caused $2.65 million (1945 USD) in damage. This report was later corrected on December 1, 1945, when the report was corrected to be a series of tornadoes. J. L. Baldwin, a meteorologist at the United States Weather Bureau office in Washington, D.C., later stated that, “these storms made April 12 the worst single day of tornado disaster[s] in the history of Oklahoma.”

== Confirmed tornadoes ==
All ratings on the Fujita scale were made by Thomas P. Grazulis, a tornado expert, and are classified as unofficial ratings since official ratings for tornadoes began in 1950. Grazulis only documented tornadoes he considered to be significant (F2+), so the true number of tornadoes for this outbreak is most likely higher. The National Weather Service in Norman, Oklahoma noted the Antlers, Oklahoma tornado was F5 on the Fujita scale, which makes that tornado’s rating an official/unofficial rating, since it is a rating mentioned by the National Weather Service before 1950.

Confirmed tornadoes by Fujita rating
| FU | F0 | F1 | F2 | F3 | F4 | F5 | Total |
|---|---|---|---|---|---|---|---|
| ? | 0 | 0 | 7 | 5 | 4 | 1 | ≥17 |

Confirmed tornadoes during April 12, 1945 (Note: All dates are based on the local time zone where the tornado touched down; however, all times are in Coordinated Universal Time and dates are split at midnight CST/CDT for consistency.)
| F# | Location | County / Parish | State | Time (UTC) | Path length | Max. width |
|---|---|---|---|---|---|---|
| F4 | Valley Brooke to Dell City to Choctaw | Oklahoma | OK | 21:25–? | 20 mi (32 km) | 400 yd (370 m) |
| F4 | 8 deaths — Between the three towns, 160 homes were destroyed. In total, the tornado killed eight people, injured 200 others, and caused $1 million (1945 USD) in damage. Most of the casualties occurred in families of personnel at Tinker Air Force Base. | | | | | |
| F3 | SE of Wilburton to Boggy | Latimer | OK | 22:15–? | 12 mi (19 km) | 200 yd (180 m) |
| F3 | 3 deaths — The community of Boggy, located 5 miles (8.0 km) north of Red Oak, sustained major damage from the tornado, with several houses, an elementary school, a teacherage, a cemetery, and a church, being largely destroyed. Three children died when a home was obliterated, and 15 individuals were injured. Notably, the elementary school's principal had released students early due to the predicted storm. This decision likely prevented more casualties, as the brick school building was subsequently found flattened to its foundation. | | | | | |
| F3 | Roland (OK) to N of Dora (AR) | Sequoyah (OK), Crawford (AR) | OK, AR | 22:30–? | 11 mi (18 km) | Unknown |
| F3 | 7 deaths — In Oklahoma, five people were killed in a small home that was destroyed. Near Dora, a girl and her grandmother were killed after the tornado destroyed their house, causing a fire which burned the debris. In total, seven people were killed and 40 others were injured. | | | | | |
| F4 | Eastern Muskogee | Muskogee | OK | 22:50–? | 3 mi (4.8 km) | 400 yd (370 m) |
| F4 | 13 deaths — The tornado struck the Hyde Park residential community, damaging or destroying multiple homes. The School for the Blind was also struck, where three people were killed after a dormitory roof collapsed. In total, 100 homes were damaged or destroyed, 13 people were killed, and 200 others were injured. The United States Weather Bureau documented that all 13 deaths occurred at the School for the Blind, while Grazulis documents that only three people were killed at the school. | | | | | |
| F2 | Hulbert | Cherokee | OK | 23:00–? | 4 mi (6.4 km) | 200 yd (180 m) |
| F2 | 4 deaths — In Hulbert, 81 structures were damaged or destroyed. On the north side of the town, four people were killed in a small home. Eight other people were injured by the tornado. | | | | | |
| F5 | Antlers to One Creek to Nashoba | Pushmataha | OK | 23:40–? | 28 mi (45 km) | 800 yd (730 m) |
| F5 | 69+ deaths — See article on this tornado | | | | | |
| F2 | S of Harrison to SE of Bellefonte | Boone | AR | 00:50–? | 5 mi (8.0 km) | 25 yd (23 m) |
| F2 | The tornado destroyed tourist cabins, a barn, a combination home/gas station, and injured two people. | | | | | |
| F3 | W to N of Pineville to S of Stella | McDonald | MO | 01:00–? | 13 mi (21 km) | 200 yd (180 m) |
| F3 | 1 death — Several homes were destroyed around Pineville. In one of the homes, a woman was killed and five other occupants were injured. In total, one person was killed and 15 others were injured. | | | | | |
| F2 | NNE of Gage Mountain to Cisco | Carroll | AR | 02:00–? | 6 mi (9.7 km) | Unknown |
| F2 | A home was destroyed in Cisco. | | | | | |
| F3 | Crosses to SE of Huntsville to E of Metalton | Madison, Carroll | AR | 02:00–? | 30 mi (48 km) | 400 yd (370 m) |
| F3 | 9 deaths — Multiple small communities were struck by this tornado. Near Japton, a person was killed in a barn that had been destroyed. South of Marble, a small home was obliterated, killing seven members of a family. Thousands of acres of forest were uprooted. In total, it killed nine people, injured 30 others, and caused $70,000 (1945 USD) in damage. | | | | | |
| F2 | Palmyra (MO) to Loraine (IL) | Marion (MO), Adams (IL) | MO, IL | 02:15–? | 30 mi (48 km) | Unknown |
| F2 | The tornado caused $500,000 (1945 USD) in damage in the city of Palmyra and $2.23 million (1945 USD) in damage to the village of Loraine. In Loraine, the business district was “torn apart”, and the dome on top of the courthouse was blown off. Multiple homes and a hotel's roofs were pulled off, and a barn near Loraine was destroyed. Three homes also had their roofs pulled off by the tornado near Mendon, Illinois. Tornado expert Thomas P. Grazulis documented that this tornado was most likely a family of smaller tornadoes, accompanied by destructive downbursts. In his assessment, it was documented that most of the damage in Palmyra was most likely caused by downbursts, rather than a tornado. | | | | | |
| F4 | Morrisville | Polk | MO | 02:45–? | 8 mi (13 km) | 300 yd (270 m) |
| F4 | 4 deaths — In the northwestern part of Morrisville, eight homes were destroyed, with deaths occurring in two of the homes. In total, the tornado killed four people, injured 16 others, and caused $250,000 (1945 USD) in damage. | | | | | |
| F2 | Plymouth to Colmar | Hancock, McDonough | IL | 02:45–? | 5 mi (8.0 km) | Unknown |
| F2 | A dozen buildings in downtown Plymouth were damaged by the tornado. A couple, living on the second story of a store, were injured when the tornado sheared the entire second story off of the building. 2 miles (3.2 km) northeast of Plymouth, a barn was “reduced to kindling” and three barns were destroyed near Colmar. The tornado caused $200,000 (1945 USD) in damage. | | | | | |
| F3 | S of Bradleyville to N of Ava to NE of Mansfield | Taney, Douglas, Wright | MO | 02:50–? | 32 mi (51 km) | 600 yd (550 m) |
| F3 | In the northeastern portion of Taney County, two farms “nearly vanished”, leaving eight people injured. Near Ava, ten homes were damaged or destroyed. Just southeast of Mansfield, “a two-story home was turned into a pile of debris”. Along the track, at least one real home was also completely leveled. In total, the tornado injured 20 people. | | | | | |
| F4 | SW of Booneville to NE of Clarksville | Logan, Johnson | AR | 03:00–? | 50 mi (80 km) | 600 yd (550 m) |
| F4 | 10 deaths — Numerous home were “swept away” between 2 miles (3.2 km) east of Paris to 8 miles (13 km) northeast of Paris. In that area, five people were killed. Near the end of the tornado’s path, the community of Minnow Creek was struck, where five other people were killed. Along the tornado’s track in Johnson County, around 100 homes were damaged or destroyed in five small communities. In total, the tornado killed ten people, injured 70 others, and caused $200,000 (1945 USD) in damage. Tornado expert Thomas P. Grazulis documents that this was most likely a tornado family, rather than a singular tornado. | | | | | |
| F2 | Industry | McDonough | IL | 03:00–? | 4 mi (6.4 km) | 50 yd (46 m) |
| F2 | Twenty buildings on the west side of Industry were damaged and one home was unroofed by the tornado. Tornado expert Thomas P. Grazulis documented that this tornado caused “minimal F2” damage. | | | | | |
| F2 | Palmyra (MO) to Quincy (IL) | Marion (MO), Adams (IL) | MO, IL | 04:00–? | >1 mi (1.6 km) | 400 yd (370 m) |
| F2 | The tornado tore apart 100 buildings in northwestern Palmyra. According to Grazulis, the tornado injured 11 people and caused $250,000 (1945 USD) in damage, along a short 1 mile (1.6 km) track in Palmyra. The United States Weather Bureau, however, stated this tornado continued into Illinois and struck Quincy 20 minutes after striking Palmyra. In Quincy, most of the damage occurred to high buildings, indicating that the “tornado evidently did not reach the ground”; however, since it caused damage to structures, it was still considered a tornado. | | | | | |

=== Antlers–One Creek–Nashoba, Oklahoma ===
Antlers–One Creek–Nashoba, Oklahoma
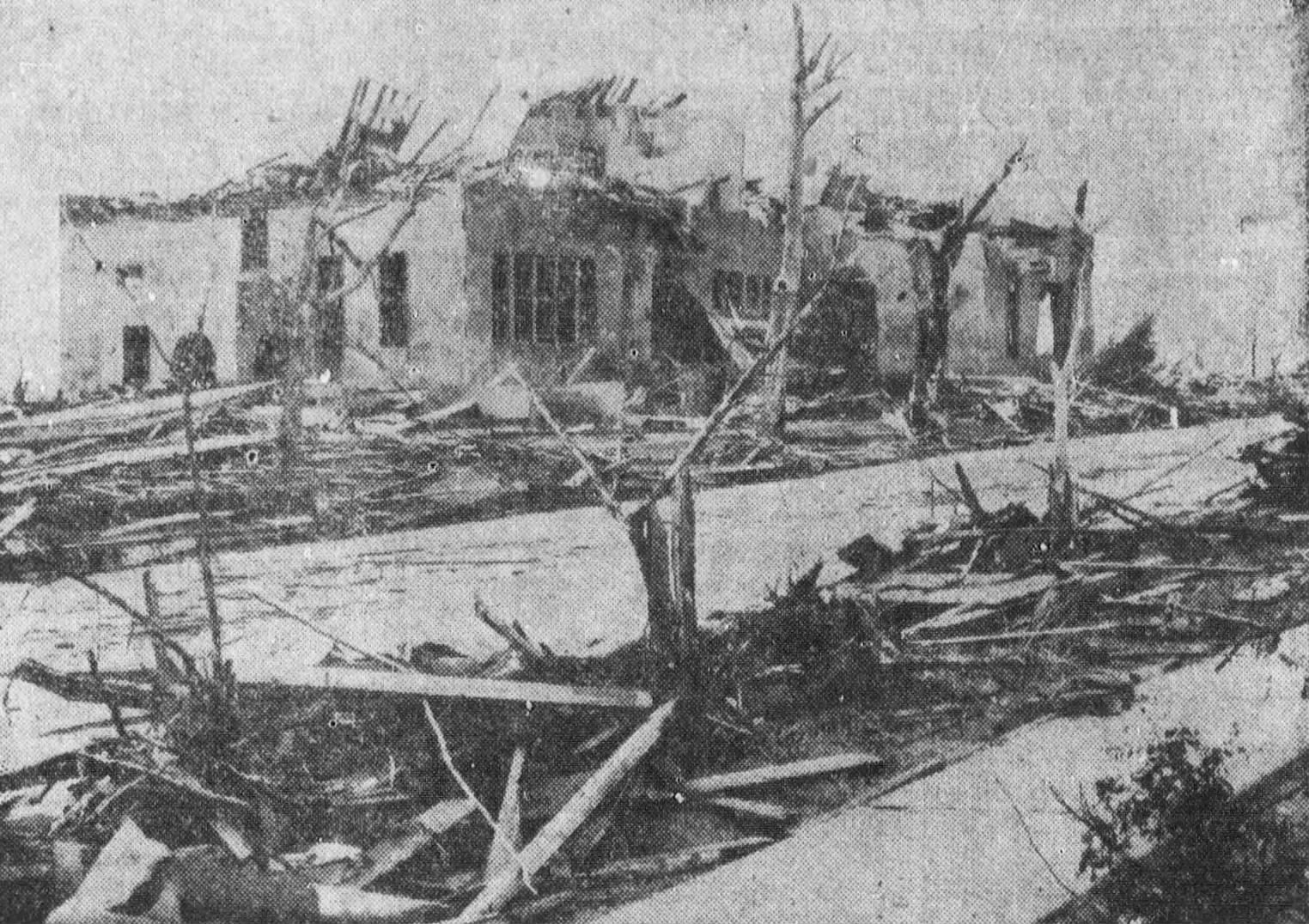
- The ruins of the St. Agnes Mission Church in Antlers.

Meteorological history
- Formed: April 12, 1945, 5:40 p.m. (UTC−05:00)
- Dissipated: April 12, 1945, 6:30 p.m. (UTC−05:00)
- Duration: Approximately 1 hour

F5 tornado
- on the Fujita scale
- Highest winds: 261–318 km/h (162–198 mph)

Overall effects
- Casualties: ≥69 fatalities, ≥343 injuries

This violent tornado, commonly known as the Antlers Tornado, devastated a third of Antlers, with over 600 structures being destroyed and over 700 others being damaged, as it crossed from the southwest corner to the northeast corner of the town. Some portions of Antlers were completely swept clean of all debris. In total, the tornado killed 69 people, injured 353 others, and caused $1.5 million (1945 USD) in damage. Despite the extremely large death toll and extreme destruction in Antlers, the tornado was barely reported, due to the death of the sitting U.S. President Franklin D. Roosevelt. Tornado expert Thomas P. Grazulis said that, “even nearby newspapers had more information on the death of the President than on the tornado”. The National Weather Service in Norman, Oklahoma (NWS Norman) marked this tornado as the fourth deadliest tornado in Oklahoma history. NWS Norman also rated this tornado F5 on the Fujita scale, making the rating on this tornado an official/unofficial rating. In December 1945, J. L. Baldwin, a meteorologist at the United States Weather Bureau office in Washington, D.C., published a paper, where he stated that this tornado was “the greatest tornado disaster during 1945”. The Tornado Project, headed by Grazulis, listed this tornado as one of the worst tornadoes in Oklahoma history. The Pushmataha County Historical Society stated that a total of 86 people were eventually killed by the storm, indicating at least 17 indirect deaths occurred from the tornado.

== See also ==
- Tornado outbreak of February 12, 1945 – A violent tornado outbreak exactly two months earlier
- 1999 Oklahoma tornado outbreak – Produced a violent F5 tornado over southern portions of Oklahoma City
- List of North American tornadoes and tornado outbreaks
- Tornado outbreak of May 18–21, 2013 – Generated an EF5 tornado in the same area as the 1999 event
- Tornado outbreak sequence of May 2003 – Spawned an F4 tornado that hit Tinker Air Force Base
