= Tornado outbreak of February 12, 1945 =

1945 tornado outbreak in the Southeastern U.S.

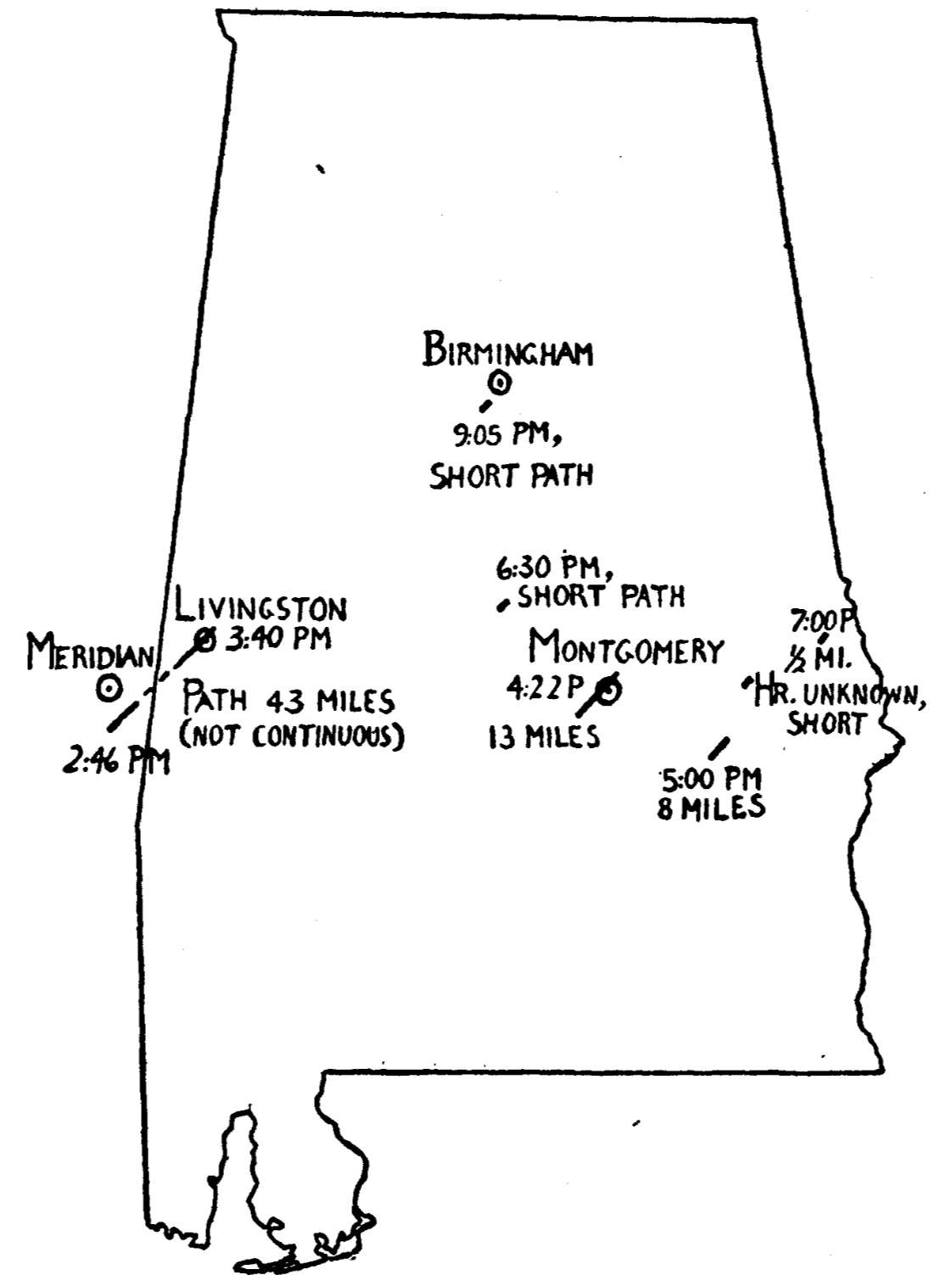
- A map of the tornado outbreak on February 12, 1945 by Floyd C. Pate.

Meteorological history
- Duration: February 12, 1945

Tornado outbreak
- Tornadoes: ≥8
- Max. rating: F4 tornado
- Duration: 6.5 hours
- Highest winds: 207–260 miles per hour (333–418 km/h)

Overall effects
- Casualties: 45 fatalities, 427 injuries
- Damage: $1.972 million ($353 million in 2025 dollars)
- Areas affected: Southeastern United States
- Part of the tornado outbreaks of 1945

On February 12, 1945, a devastating tornado outbreak occurred across the Southeastern United States. The storms killed 45 people and injured 427 others. The outbreak included a devastating tornado that struck Montgomery, Alabama, killing 26 people. The United States Weather Bureau described this tornado as "perhaps the most officially observed one in history" as it reached within five miles (8 km) of the U.S. Weather Bureau's office. Tornado expert Thomas P. Grazulis estimated the intensity of the Montgomery tornado to be F3 on the Fujita scale. The Montgomery storm destroyed around 100 houses, as well as two warehouses and a freight train. This is the deadliest tornado to ever impact the city of Montgomery.

Earlier that day, another tornado – also estimated to be F3 intensity – struck Meridian, Mississippi, killing five to seven people. Located east of the Meridian tornado, the strongest tornado of the day struck near York and Livingston, Alabama, killing 11 people. Grazulis estimated the intensity of this tornado to be F4 on the Fujita scale.

== Confirmed tornadoes ==
All ratings on the Fujita scale were made by Thomas P. Grazulis and are classified as unofficial ratings, since official ratings for tornadoes only began in 1950. Grazulis only documented tornadoes he considered to be significant (F2+), so the true number of tornadoes for this outbreak is most likely higher. That said, the National Weather Service (NWS) office in Birmingham, Alabama, published a list of Alabama's 1945 tornadoes, assigning Fujita scale ratings to the tornadoes, and lending official support to the ratings for these tornadoes.

Confirmed tornadoes by Fujita rating
FU	F0	F1	F2	F3	F4	F5	Total
≥ 0	≥ 0	≥ 0	3	4	1	0	≥8

=== February 12 event ===
Confirmed tornadoes during February 12, 1945 (Note: All dates are based on the local time zone where the tornado touched down; however, all times are in Coordinated Universal Time for consistency.)
F#	Location	County / Parish	State	Time (local)	Path length	Max width
F3	Jones to Vimville	Lauderdale	MS	15:35	9 mi (14 km)	400 yd (370 m)
F3	7 deaths – The tornado started in the community of Jones, seven miles (11 km) south of Meridian, and moved northeastward. Multiple homes in rural communities were completely swept away, with four deaths occurring in three of these homes. A fifth person was killed in an open field while running for shelter. In total, five people were killed and 40 others were injured. This was one of three tornadoes marked by Grazulis that the United States Weather Bureau originally regarded as a single, long-track tornado that killed 40 people and injured 200 others. Modern research by Thomas P. Grazulis, as well as later publications from the U.S. Weather Bureau, indicates that there were actually three separate tornadoes. Two more deaths and a total of 50 injuries were reported by the Associated Press, as cited by the National Weather Service office in Birmingham, Alabama. This brings the total number of deaths to seven and the total number of injuries to 50 for this tornado.					
F4	Near York to near Livingston	Sumter	AL	16:30	18 mi (29 km)	400 yd (370 m)
F4	11 deaths – A home was leveled on the southeastern edge of York, where a couple was killed. In Livingston, five people were killed in a single home. Two other homes were damaged or destroyed, and a person was killed in each. The tornado struck a train crossing the Sucarnoochee River, where it derailed 39 cars. The conductor of the train was killed, along with a fireman, and many others were injured. In total, the tornado killed 11 people, injured 63 others, and caused $220,000 (1945 USD) in damage. This is one of the three tornadoes marked by Grazulis that the United States Weather Bureau originally regarded as a single long-track tornado that killed 40 people and injured 200 others. Modern research by Thomas P. Grazulis as well as later publications from the U.S. Weather Bureau indicate that there were actually three separate tornadoes.					
F3	Southwest of Montgomery to Chisholm	Montgomery	AL	17:22	13 mi (21 km)	350 yd (320 m)
F3	26 deaths – See section on this tornado – 293 people were injured.					
F2	West of Union Springs to Thompson	Bullock	AL	18:00	8 mi (13 km)	100 yd (91 m)
F2	Four homes were destroyed in Thompson, and four others were damaged. Nine people were injured.					
F3	East of Tuskegee	Macon	AL	18:30	0.5 mi (0.80 km)	120 yd (110 m)
F3	This brief, intense tornado struck a cluster of five small homes, destroying all of them and leaving two people injured.					
F2	South of Opelika	Lee	AL	19:30	0.5 mi (0.80 km)	125 yd (114 m)
F2	The tornado destroyed two barns and four other buildings, injuring one person.					
F3	Southeast of Stanton	Chilton	AL	19:45	1 mi (1.6 km)	100 yd (91 m)
F3	1 death – A large house and a barn were destroyed southeast of Stanton. One person was killed and eight others were injured.					
F2	Shades Mountain	Jefferson	AL	22:05	0.5 mi (0.80 km)	120 yd (110 m)
F2	Seven buildings were destroyed, six were damaged, and one person was injured. A roof from one of the buildings was carried over one mile (1.6 km).					

=== Montgomery–Chisholm, Alabama ===
Montgomery–Chisholm, Alabama
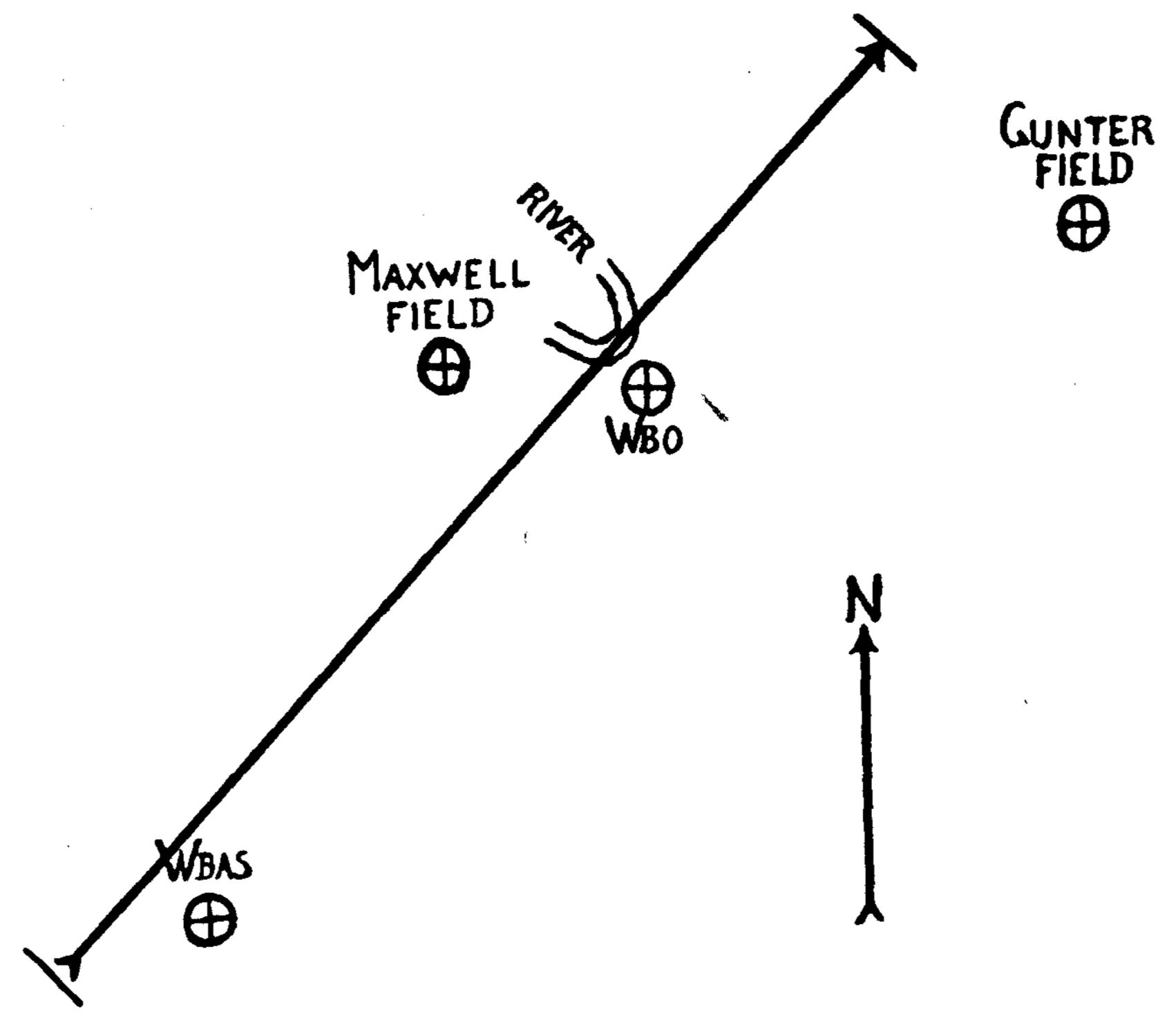
- A map of the Montgomery, Alabama tornado

Meteorological history
- Formed: February 12, 1945, 4:22 p.m. CST

F3 tornado
- on the Fujita scale

Overall effects
- Fatalities: 26
- Injuries: 293
- Damage: $1.7 million ($30 million in 2025 dollars)

The tornado started five miles (8.0 km) southwest of Montgomery, Alabama, and moved northeast, toward Montgomery, where it brushed the western edge of the city. The tornado leveled two warehouses belonging to either the government or the U.S. army. A freight train was also struck, where, according to the Associated Press, fifty cars "were ripped and tossed about like match boxes". Maxwell Air Force Base was plunged into hours of darkness due to an electrical blackout caused by the tornado, which passed close to the base. After hitting Montgomery, the tornado struck Chisholm, Alabama, where it caused catastrophic damage, including the destruction of 35 homes. All the fatalities from this tornado occurred in 15 homes within a 20-block radius. Along its 13-mile (21 km) path, the tornado killed 26 people, injured 293 others, completely destroyed around 100 homes, and caused $1.7 million in damage (around $30 million in 2025).

In his book, Grazulis states that the maximum width of this tornado was 100 yards (91 m), whereas the United States Weather Bureau reported that the tornado was uniformly 100 yards (91 m) wide except near Union Station, where it momentarily grew to its peak width of 350 yards (320 m). The Bureau documented that this long-track tornado killed 40 people and injured 200 others. Modern research published by Grazulis and a later publication from the U.S. Weather Bureau indicate that there were actually three separate tornadoes. The Tornado Project, headed by Grazulis, later listed this set of storms as one of the "worst tornadoes" in the history of Alabama.

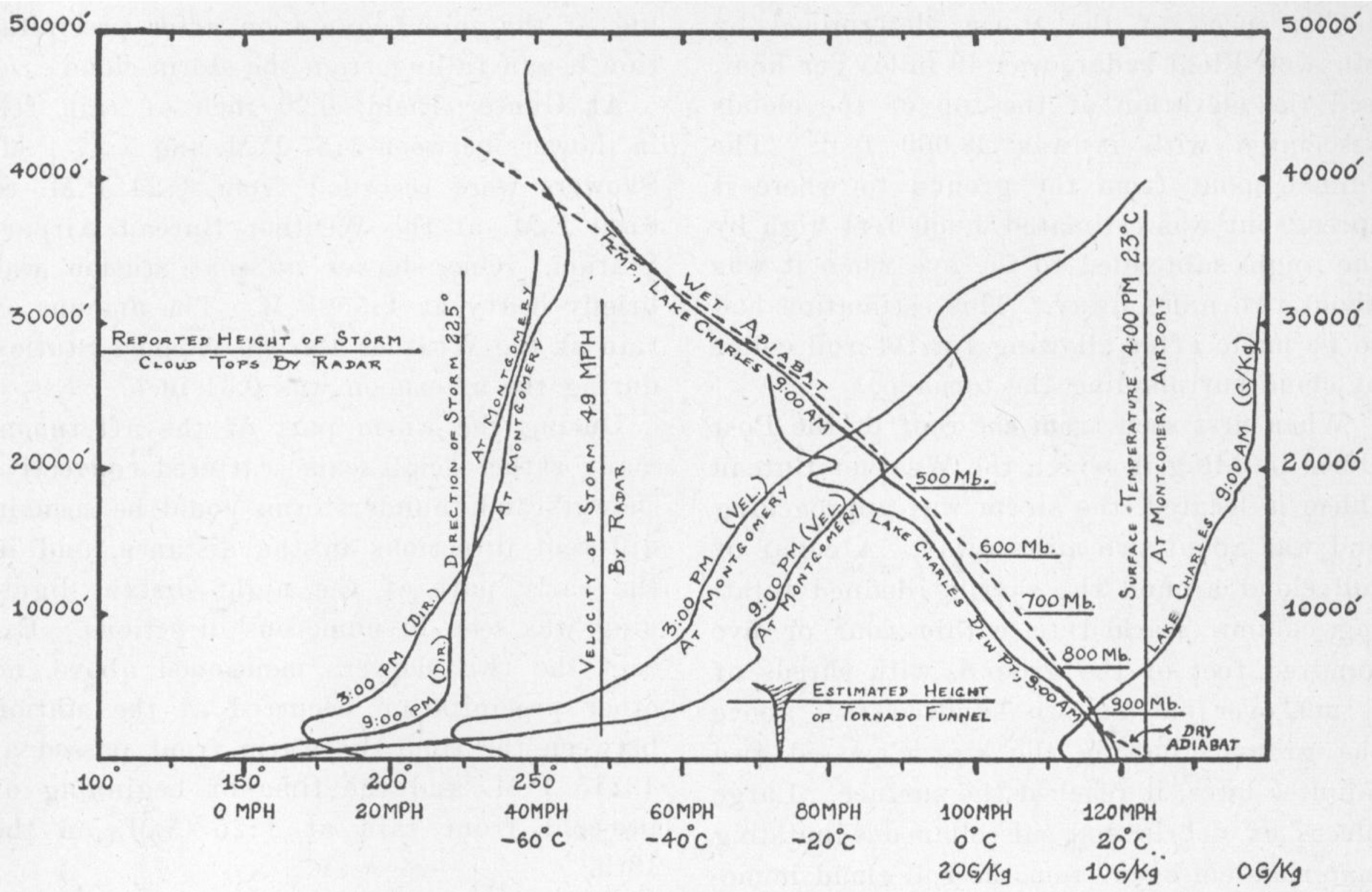
Observed conditions from the tornado and the environment near the tornado

The entire city of Montgomery lost power for several hours following the tornado. The Alabama governor, Chauncey Sparks, ordered three companies from the Alabama National Guard to the state capital to prevent looting. As news of the tornado's impact on Montgomery and Chisholm spread, curiosity set in as residents attempted to travel to the affected areas "by the thousands", causing traffic congestion and blocking of the roads. Military police from Maxwell Air Force Base and Gunter Field, along with local law enforcement, eventually cleared the streets of onlookers. Cadets from both military bases were sent to clear away the debris while organizations such as the Red Cross cared for those who were injured or left homeless by the storm.

Floyd C. Pate, a forecaster at the United States Weather Bureau office in Montgomery, Alabama, undertook an extensive assessment of this tornado between 1945 and 1946. During this assessment, Pate called this tornado "perhaps the most officially observed one in history", as it passed 2 miles (3.2 km) away from four different government weather stations, including his own U.S. Weather Bureau office in Montgomery. Fellow U.S. Weather Bureau meteorologist E. D. Emigh stated that he watched the tornado from his downtown observatory.

The radar at Maxwell Field, one of the government weather stations passed by the tornado, determined the forward speed of the tornado to have been 49 miles per hour (79 km/h), with a height of 4,000 feet (1,200 m). The storm which produced the tornado was dry, with no documentable precipitation. It was noted that as the tornado dissipated, a rain shaft formed in place of the tornado, which dropped 0.3 inches (0.76 cm) of rain.

== See also ==
- Tornado outbreak of April 12, 1945
- History of tornado research
