= John Park Finley =

American meteorologist (1854–1943)

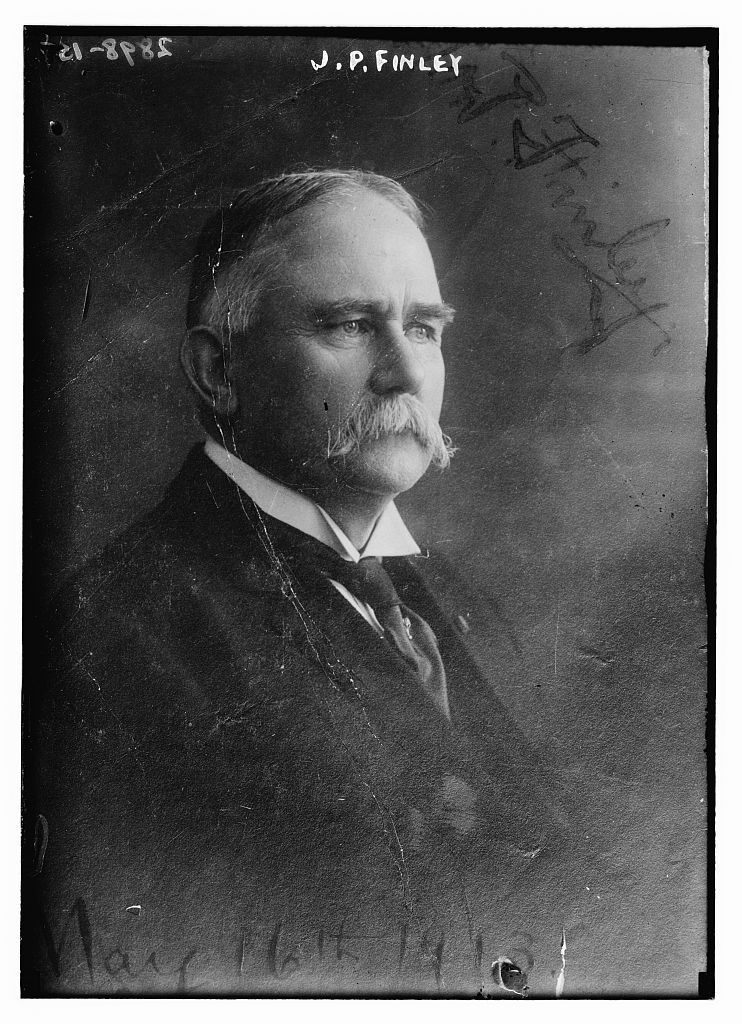
- Finley in 1913
- Born: April 11, 1854; Ann Arbor, Michigan, US
- Died: November 24, 1943 (aged 89); Battle Creek, Michigan, US
- Known for: Tornado research

John Park Finley (April 11, 1854 – November 24, 1943) was an American meteorologist and Army Signal Service officer who was the first person to study tornadoes intensively and pioneer tornado forecasting. He also wrote the first known book on the subject as well as many other manuals and booklets, collected vast climatological data, set up a nationwide weather observer network, started one of the first private weather enterprises, and opened an early aviation weather school.

== Biography ==
John Park Finley was born on April 11, 1854, in Ann Arbor, Michigan. In the late 1860s into the early 1870s, he attended Michigan State Agricultural and Mechanical College, now Michigan State University. He graduated with a Bachelors in Science in 1873, specializing in climate impacts on agriculture. In 1877, he enlisted in US Army Signal Service, and was subsequently assigned to the Philadelphia, Pennsylvania signal office, where he kindled an interest in severe weather and tornadoes. Finley was soon stationed in Washington, where he was frequently ordered by the service to survey nearby tornado damage. In subsequent years, Finley authored several books, including his Tornadoes: What They Are and How To Observe Them. He died on November 24, 1943, in Battle Creek, Michigan.

== Selected works ==
The University of Oklahoma holds a large collection of Finley's publications. Here are some selected works, which may or may not be contained in said collection:

- John P. Finley (1881). The tornadoes of May 29 and 30, 1879, In Kansas, Nebraska, Missouri, and Iowa. Prof. Paper No. 4, U.S. Signal Service.
- John P. Finley, WB Hazen (1884). Charts of Relative Storm Frequency for a Portion of the Northern Hemisphere. U.S. Army Signal Office.
- John P. Finley (1884). Tornado predictions. American Meteorological Journal, 1, 85-8
- John P. Finley (1884). Report of the character of six hundred tornadoes. Prof. Paper No. 7, U.S. Signal Service, 116 pp.
- John P. Finley (1884). The Special Characteristics of Tornadoes, With Practical Directions for the Protection of Life and Property, 19pp.
- John P. Finley (1887). Tornadoes: What They Are and How to Observe Them. Insurance Monitor Press, New York, 196 pp.
- John P. Finley (1888). Tornadoes: What They Are, and How to Escape Them, 90pp.
- John P. Finley (1889). State Tornado Charts. Amer. Meteor. J., 5.
- John P. Finley (1888). Iowa Tornadoes for 51 Years, 1837-1887, 10pp.
- John P. Finley (1888). The Tornadoes of Illinois for 54 Years, 1835-1887, 12pp.
- John P. Finley (1888). Kansas Tornadoes for 29 Years, 1859-1887, 12pp.
- John P. Finley (1893). Certain Climatic Features of the Two Dakotas, 192pp.

== See also ==
- Johannes Letzmann, tornado researcher
