= Floyd C. Pate =

American meteorologist

- Scientific career
- Fields: Meteorology
- Institutions: United States Weather Bureau

Floyd C. Pate was an American meteorologist who worked for the United States Weather Bureau and was a member of the American Meteorological Society. Pate worked at the U.S. Weather Bureau office in Montgomery, Alabama as a forecaster, then at the office in Lynchburg, Virginia, and later as the meteorologist in charge (MIC) of the office in Enewetak Atoll, Marshall Islands.

== Works ==
Pate is best known for conducting a detailed case study on the 1945 Montgomery tornado titled The Tornado at Montgomery, Alabama, February 12, 1945. Pate described the tornado as "the most officially observed one in history", as it passed 2 miles (3.2 km) away from four different government weather stations, including the U.S. Weather Bureau office in Montgomery.

In 1956, Pate, along with other meteorologists at the U.S. Weather Bureau office in Montgomery, Alabama, published an academic study titled Lightning Damages in Alabama.
