= Johannes Letzmann =

Estonian meteorologist

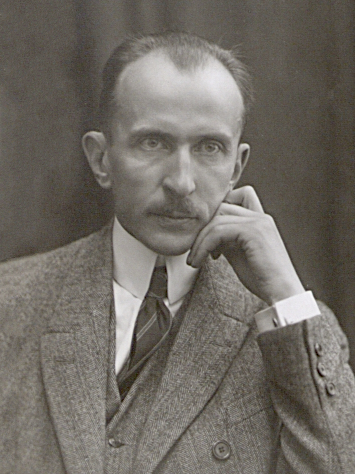
- Born: 19 July 1885; Wenden, Livonia now Cēsis, Latvia
- Died: 21 May 1971 (aged 85); Langeoog, West Germany
- Education: University of Tartu; University of Helsinki
- Known for: Tornado damage analysis
- Scientific career
- Fields: Meteorology
- Workplaces: University of Tartu; University of Graz

Johannes Peter Letzmann (19 July 1885 – 21 May 1971) was an Estonian meteorologist, and a pioneering tornado researcher. His prolific output related to severe storms concepts included: developing tornado damage studies, atmospheric vortices, theoretical studies and laboratory simulations, tornado case studies, and observation programs. It generated extensive analysis techniques and insights on tornadoes at a time when there was still very little research on the subject in the United States.

== Biography ==
From 1906 to 1913, Letzmann attended the University of Tartu in Tartu, Estonia, studying meteorology. His career studying tornadoes began in 1918 when the esteemed visiting scientist Alfred Wegener introduced him to his copious European tornado climatological and other studies. The University of Helsinki awarded Letzmann a PhD in 1924. Most of his studies were done at Dorpat (Tartu), but he did travel with Wegener for a year in 1928 to the University of Graz. He was a professor of meteorology at the University of Graz from 1939 (or 1940) to 1945. There he built a "Forschungsstelle für atmosphärische Wirbel" (Research Center for Atmospheric Whirls). After the Second World War, he lost his chair, but remained in Graz, Austria. In 1962, he elected to retire to a hostel established for former Baltic Germans at Langeoog, an island off the North Sea coast of Germany. Letzmann's antebellum work remained forgotten for decades until rediscovery beginning in the 1990s.

== See also ==
- John Park Finley
