= Valentinovka =

Valentinovka Валентиновка
- Selo
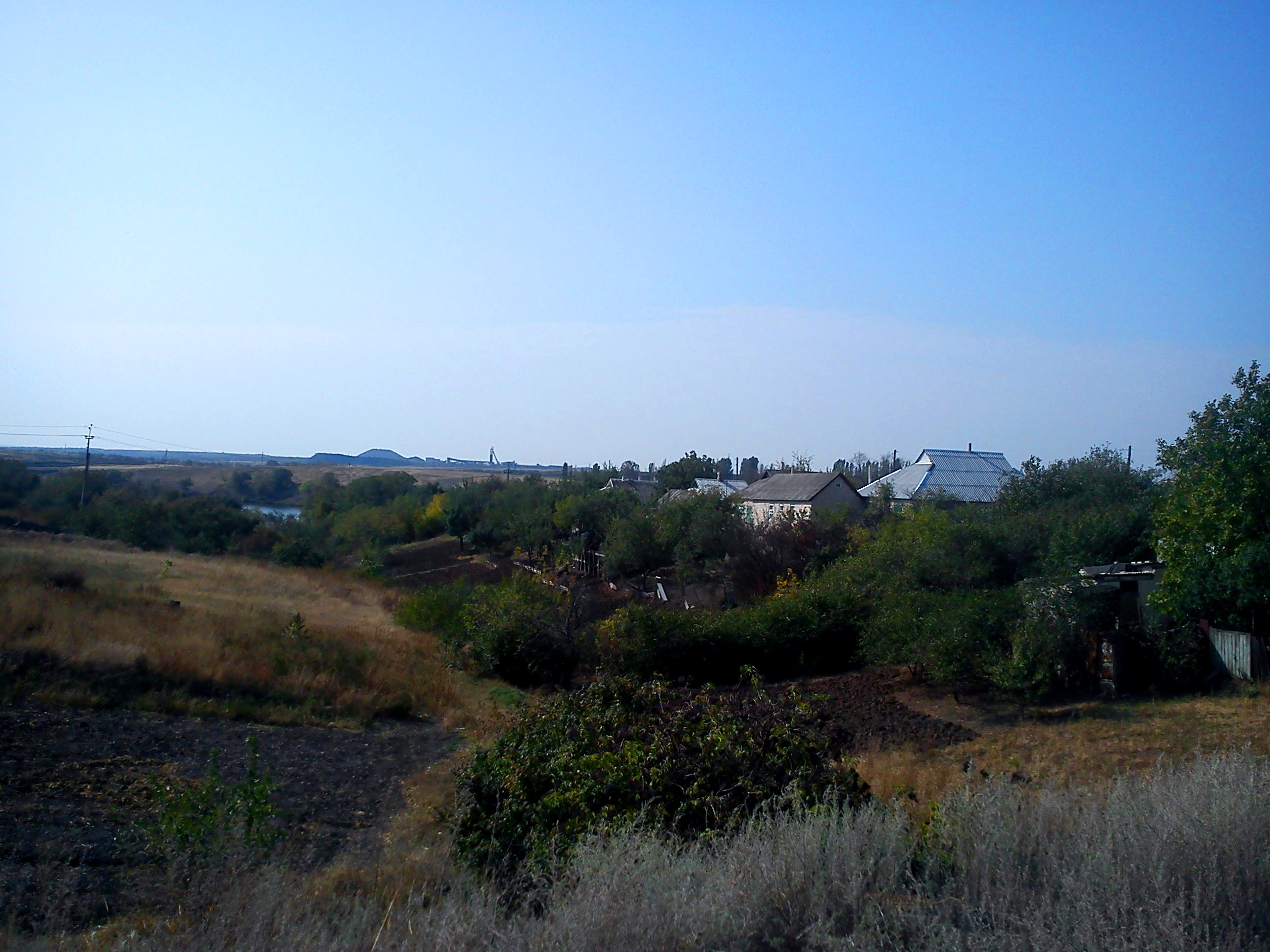

- Location within Bashkortostan Location within Russia
- Coordinates: 54°32′N 56°52′E
- Country: Russia
- Region: Bashkortostan
- District: Arkhangelsky District
- Time zone: UTC+5:00

Valentinovka (Russian: Валентиновка) is a rural locality (a selo) and the administrative center of Inzersky Selsoviet, Arkhangelsky District, Bashkortostan, Russia. The population was 592 as of 2010. There are 12 streets.

== Geography ==
Valentinovka is located 20 km north of Arkhangelskoye (the district's administrative centre) by road. Sukhopol is the nearest rural locality.
