= Tornadoes of 1945 =

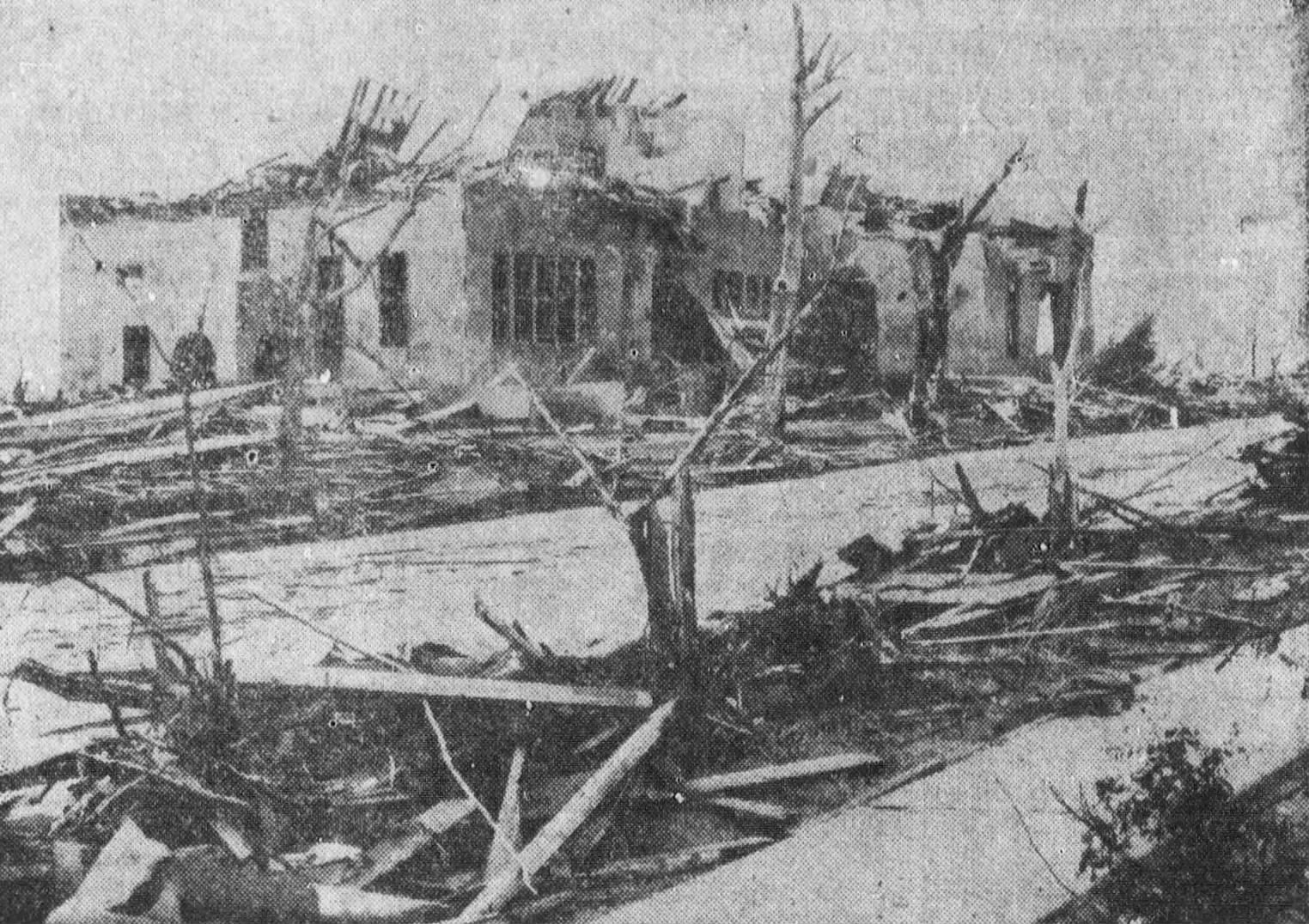
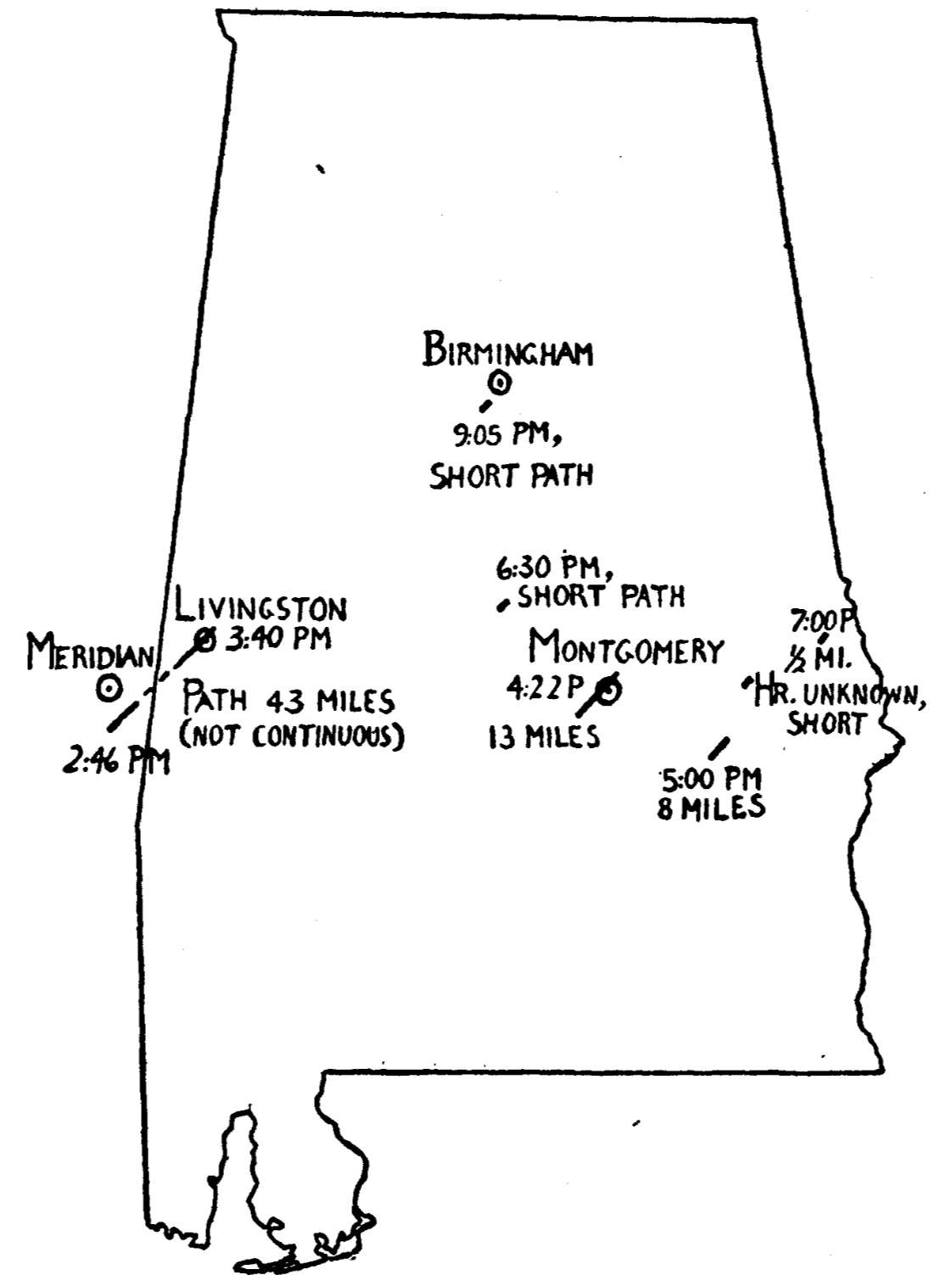
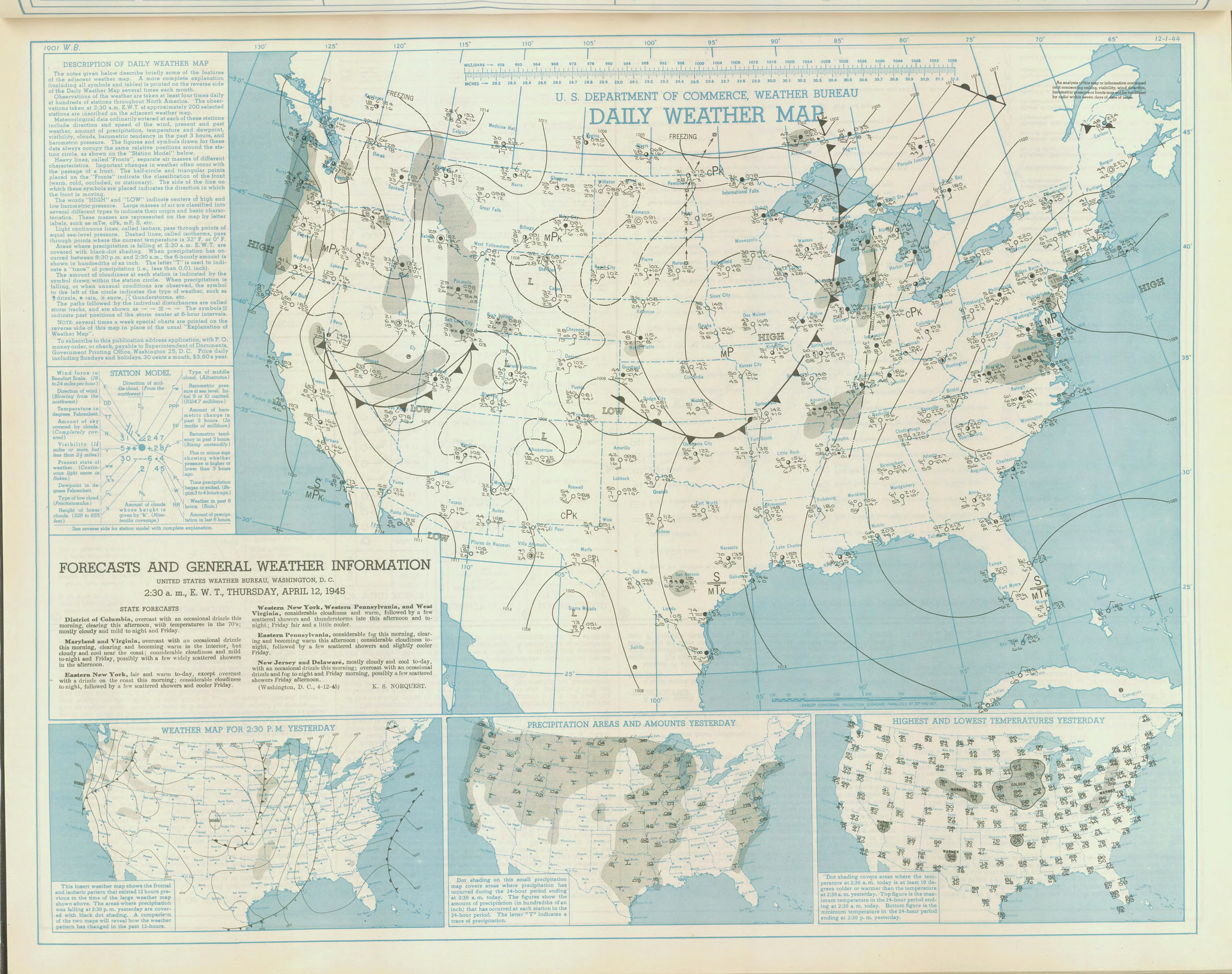
- Clockwise from the top: A church after a F5 tornado in Antlers; The Daily Weather Map for April 12, 1945, issued at 2:30 a.m. EST; A map of the tornado outbreak on February 12, 1945 by Floyd C. Pate
- Timespan: February 12 — December 24
- Maximum rated tornado: F5 tornado: Antlers, Oklahoma on April 12
- Tornadoes in U.S.: ≥136 (Note: Totals are from J. L. Baldwin, who worked for the U.S. Weather Bureau and wrote an academically peer reviewed paper in Monthly Weather Review)
- Damage (U.S.): ~$21,724,500 (U.S. Weather Bureau)
- Fatalities (U.S.): ≥205 (Grazulis); 198 (U.S. Weather Bureau)
- Fatalities (worldwide): ≥205

This page documents the tornadoes and tornado outbreaks of 1945, primarily in the United States. Most recorded tornadoes form in the U.S., although some events may take place internationally. Tornado statistics for older years like this often appear significantly lower than modern years due to fewer reports or confirmed tornadoes.

All documented significant tornadoes prior to 1950 in the United States were given unofficial ratings by tornado experts like Thomas P. Grazulis, which this article uses for the ratings below. Most of these records are limited to significant tornadoes; those rated F2 or higher on the Fujita scale, or which caused a fatality. Some listed events were tornado families rather than single tornadoes. There are also no official tornado counts for each month, so not every month is included in this article. In subsequent years, the documentation of tornadoes became much more widespread and efficient, with the average annual tornado count being around 1,253. Outside the United States, various meteorological organizations, like the European Severe Storms Laboratory rated tornadoes, which are considered official ratings.

== Events ==
=== United States yearly total ===
Confirmed tornadoes by Fujita rating
FU	F0	F1	F2	F3	F4	F5	Total
≥	?	?	≥67	≥29	≥8	≥1	≥105

(Note: Totals are from Grazulis, who only lists F2 and stronger tornadoes and F1/F0 tornadoes with fatalities.)

== February ==
=== February 12 ===
Confirmed tornadoes by Fujita rating
FU	F0	F1	F2	F3	F4	F5	Total
≥ 0	≥ 0	≥ 0	3	4	1	0	≥8

On February 12, 1945, a devastating tornado outbreak occurred across the Southeastern United States. The storms killed 45 people and injured 427 others. An violent F4 tore through York. The most devastating tornado was an F3 near Montgomery.

== April ==
=== April 12 ===
FU	F0	F1	F2	F3	F4	F5
?	0	0	7	5	4	1

On April 12, 1945, a tornado outbreak occurred in the Midwestern United States, producing numerous strong tornadoes and killing at least 128 people and injuring over 1,000 others. The strongest tornado of the day was an F5 near Antlers.

== September ==
=== September 2 (Soviet Union) ===
A tornado, rated F3 by the European Severe Storms Laboratory struck Valentinovka, Soviet Union, which is a suburb of Moscow. It was noted that a damage survey was conducted by a “severe weather expert” to determine the rating and that the tornado had a path length of 15 kilometres (9.3 mi) with a maximum width of 300 metres (330 yd). No information was provided about the damage caused by the tornado.

=== September 21 (Argentina) ===
An F2 tornado struck Armstrong in Argentina.

=== September 26 (Belarus) ===
A tornado, rated F1 by the European Severe Storms Laboratory struck Barsuki, Belarus, injuring one person. It was noted that the rating was based on a written account of the damage.

== October ==
=== October 20 (United Kingdom) ===
A tornado, rated F2/T4 by the European Severe Storms Laboratory struck Titchfield, England. It was noted that a damage survey was conducted by a “severe weather expert” with no further information given.
