= List of United States tornadoes in March 1973 =

This is a list of all tornadoes that were confirmed by local offices of the National Weather Service in the United States in March 1973. By the end of the month, damage totals were up to $57,054,800 (1973 USD).

== United States yearly total ==
Confirmed tornadoes by Fujita rating
FU	F0	F1	F2	F3	F4	F5	Total
0	219	497	301	71	13	1	1102

== March ==
Confirmed tornadoes by Fujita rating
FU	F0	F1	F2	F3	F4	F5	Total
0	12	29	35	2	2	0	80

=== March 1 event ===
List of confirmed tornadoes - Thursday, March 1, 1973
F#	Location	County	Coord.	Time (UTC)	Path length	Damage
Texas
F2	Bosqueville/Lacy Lakeview areas	McLennan	31.62°N 97.2°W	1450	8 miles (12.9 km)	A tornado caused at least $50,000 (1973 USD) in damages.

=== March 3 event ===
List of confirmed tornadoes - Saturday, March 3, 1973
F#	Location	County	Coord.	Time (UTC)	Path length	Damage
Texas
F0	Wichita Falls area	Wichita	33.92°N 98.52°W	1800	0.1 miles (0.2 km)	A tornado caused at least $50 (1973 USD) in damages.

=== March 6 event ===
List of confirmed tornadoes - Tuesday, March 6, 1973
F#	Location	County	Coord.	Time (UTC)	Path length	Damage
Texas
F2	Hurst area	Tarrant	32.82°N 97.18°W	0625	1.5 miles (2.4 km)	A tornado caused at least $5,000 (1973 USD) in damages.
F1	Austin area	Travis	30.3°N 97.6°W	0805	0.1 miles (0.2 km)	

=== March 8 event ===
List of confirmed tornadoes - Thursday, March 8, 1973
F#	Location	County	Coord.	Time (UTC)	Path length	Damage
Florida
F1	W of Sylvan Shores	Highlands	27.32°N 81.38°W	1720	0.3 miles (0.5 km)	A tornado caused at least $50 (1973 USD) in damages.
F2	NW of Belleview	Marion	29.07°N 82.1°W	2320	1.5 miles (2.4 km)	A tornado caused at least $50,000 (1973 USD) in damages.
Kansas
F2	SW of Galesburg to Erie to E of Walnut	Neosho, Crawford	37.43°N 95.4°W	1950	23.5 miles (37.8 km)	A tornado caused at least $50,000 (1973 USD) in damages.

=== March 9 event ===
List of confirmed tornadoes - Friday, March 9, 1973
F#	Location	County	Coord.	Time (UTC)	Path length	Damage
Texas
F0	ENE of Ennis	Ellis	32.33°N 96.5°W	1959	1.5 miles (2.4 km)	

=== March 10 event ===
List of confirmed tornadoes - Saturday, March 10, 1973
F#	Location	County	Coord.	Time (UTC)	Path length	Damage
Texas
F2	WSW of Miles	Tom Green	31.58°N 100.25°W	0140	0.3 miles (0.5 km)	1 death – A tornado killed one person near Miles. The tornado caused at least $50,000 (1973 USD) in damages.
F2	W of Potosi	Taylor	32.33°N 99.75°W	0300	0.1 miles (0.2 km)	A tornado caused at least $5,000 (1973 USD) in damages.
F3	Burnet area	Burnet	30.73°N 98.23°W	0410	7.8 miles (12.6 km)	A tornado injured 40 people.
F1	Mueller area	Travis	30.3°N 97.7°W	0545	0.3 miles (0.5 km)	A tornado caused at least $50,000 (1973 USD) in damages.
F4	Mart to Hubbard	McLennan, Limestone, Hill	31.53°N 96.83°W	0602	23.3 miles (37.5 km)	6 deaths - A long-tracked, violent tornado destroyed many houses in Mart and traveled NNW. The tornado caused significant ground scouring before hitting Watt. The tornado moved NE afterwards. The tornado hit Hubbard and dissipated in the middle of the town. The tornado injured at least 77 people.
F1	ESE of Loebau	Lee	30.28°N 96.88°W	0700	0.1 miles (0.2 km)	A tornado caused at least $50 (1973 USD) in damages.
F3	S of Gordonville	Grayson	33.77°N 96.85°W	0700	6.8 miles (10.9 km)	A long-tracked, strong tornado traveled along the Hagerman National Wildlife Refuge and tracked near Pottsboro, injuring at least 3 people.
F2	SSW of Pattonville	Lamar	33.57°N 95.4°W	0800	1.5 miles (2.4 km)	A tornado caused at least $5,000 (1973 USD) in damages.
F1	SW of East Tawakoni	Rains	32.87°N 95.95°W	0800	0.3 miles (0.5 km)	A tornado caused at least $50,000 (1973 USD) in damages.
F2	Sulphur Springs area	Hopkins	33.17°N 95.63°W	0845	0.5 miles (0.8 km)	A tornado caused at least $5,000 (1973 USD) in damages.
F1	Price area	Rusk	32.13°N 94.95°W	1000	0.1 miles (0.2 km)	A tornado caused at least $500 (1973 USD) in damages.
Arkansas
F2	SE of Wimar to NE of Rye	Drew	33.62°N 91.92°W	1530	11.5 miles (18.5 km)	A tornado caused at least $5,000 (1973 USD) in damages.
Mississippi
F2	SE of Grenada to E of Coffeeville	Grenada, Yalobusha	33.72°N 89.78°W	2200	19.9 miles (32.0 km)	A tornado caused at least $50,000 (1973 USD) in damages.

=== March 11 event ===
List of confirmed tornadoes - Sunday, March 11, 1973
F#	Location	County	Coord.	Time (UTC)	Path length	Damage
Mississippi
F2	WNW of Sanatorium to SE of Puckett	Simpson, Rankin	31.9°N 89.8°W	0125	12.9 miles (20.8 km)	A long-tracked tornado moved near Mendenhall, injuring one person when it hit Puckett.
Wisconsin
F1	Kegonsa area	Dane	42.95°N 89.22°W	0805	0.5 miles (0.8 km)	
F1	SSW of Garnet	Fond du Lac, Calumet	43.92°N 88.27°W	1030	2 miles (3.2 km)	A tornado caused at least $5,000 (1973 USD) in damages.

=== March 13 event ===
List of confirmed tornadoes - Monday, March 13, 1973
F#	Location	County	Coord.	Time (UTC)	Path length	Damage
Texas
F1	SSW of Colorado City to WNW of Loraine	Mitchell	32.37°N 100.87°W	0900	9.8 miles (15.8 km)	A tornado struck Colorado City and traveled in opened fields near Loraine. The tornado caused at least $5,000 (1973 USD) in damages.
Oklahoma
F2	Granite area	Greer	34.95°N 99.4°W	1153	4.5 miles (7.2 km)	A tornado caused at least $5,000 (1973 USD) in damages.
F2	NW of Geronimo	Comanche	34.5°N 98.43°W	1227	0.1 miles (0.2 km)	A tornado caused at least $5,000 (1973 USD) in damages.
F1	NNW of Temple	Cotton	34.3°N 98.25°W	1235	6.6 miles (10.6 km)	A tornado caused at least $5,000 (1973 USD) in damages.
F0	S of Waurika	Jefferson	34.15°N 98.0°W	1250	0.5 miles (0.8 km)	A tornado caused at least $5,000 (1973 USD) in damages.
F2	WSW of Kildare, OK to ENE of Atlanta, KS	Kay (OK), Cowley (KS)	36.8°N 97.13°W	1508-1548	51.6 miles (83.0 km)	A long–tracked tornado caused at least $500,000 (1973 USD) in damages.
Kansas
F2	N of Coldwater	Comanche	37.35°N 99.33°W	1320	2.3 miles (3.7 km)	A tornado caused at least $5,000 (1973 USD) in damages.
F1	Goodland area	Sherman	39.33°N 101.7°W	1512	0.1 miles (0.2 km)	A tornado caused at least $500 (1973 USD) in damages.
F2	SE of Olpe to WNW of Neosho Rapids	Lyon	38.23°N 96.12°W	1700	10.2 miles (16.4 km)	A tornado caused at least $5,000 (1973 USD) in damages.
F2	Plainville area	Rooks	39.23°N 99.28°W	1710	1 mile (1.6 km)	A tornado caused at least $50,000 (1973 USD) in damages.
F2	NE of Portis to Lebanon	Smith	39.58°N 98.58°W	1800	17.2 miles (27.7 km)	A long-tracked tornado caused no injuries or fatalities. The tornado caused at least $5,000 (1973 USD) in damages.
F0	Olathe area	Johnson	38.88°N 94.82°W	1820	4.6 miles (7.4 km)	A tornado caused at least $5,000 (1973 USD) in damages.
Missouri
F2	SW of Table Rock	Stone	36.57°N 93.33°W	2020	2.5 miles (4.0 km)	A waterspout tornado touched down on Table Rock Lake. The tornado caused at least $5,000 (1973 USD) in damages.
F2	E of Elkhead	Douglas	37.0°N 92.82°W	2105	2 miles (3.2 km)	A tornado caused at least $5,000 (1973 USD) in damages.
F1	Columbia area	Boone	38.9°N 92.28°W	2146	6.1 miles (9.8 km)	A tornado caused at least $5,000 (1973 USD) in damages.
F1	SE of Millwood	Lincoln	39.08°N 91.17°W	2330	1.8 miles (2.9 km)	A tornado caused at least $5,000 (1973 USD) in damages.

=== March 15 event ===
List of confirmed tornadoes - Wednesday, March 15, 1973
F#	Location	County	Coord.	Time (UTC)	Path length	Damage
Tennessee
F2	Sparta area	White	35.92°N 85.5°W	0200	0.1 miles (0.2 km)	1 death - A tornado caused at least $50,000 (1973 USD) in damages.

=== March 16 event ===
List of confirmed tornadoes - Thursday, March 16, 1973
F#	Location	County	Coord.	Time (UTC)	Path length	Damage
Alabama
F2	W of Marbury to NNW of Titus	Autauga, Chilton, Coosa	32.7°N 86.5°W	0730	9.7 miles (15.6 km)	A tornado caused at least $50,000 (1973 USD) in damages.
F1	SW of Epes	Sumter	32.67°N 88.18°W	1020	1 mile (1.6 km)	A tornado caused at least $50,000 (1973 USD) in damages.
F2	WNW of Havana	Hale	32.9°N 87.67°W	1030	4.5 miles (7.2 km)	A tornado caused at least $5,000 (1973 USD) in damages.
F2	ENE of Arcola	Hale	32.62°N 87.67°W	1100	9.5 miles (15.3 km)	A tornado caused at least $50,000 (1973 USD) in damages.
F2	Pelham area	Shelby	33.28°N 86.82°W	1210	4.3 miles (6.9 km)	A tornado injured five people. The tornado caused at least $50,000 (1973 USD) in damages.
F1	Pell City area	St. Clair	33.58°N 86.28°W	1230	1 mile (1.6 km)	A tornado caused at least $50,000 (1973 USD) in damages.
Georgia
F2	SE of Trion	Chattooga	34.5°N 85.25°W	1325	7.6 miles (12.2 km)	One person was injured. The tornado caused at least $500,000 (1973 USD) in damages.
F2	Resaca area	Gordon	34.57°N 84.95°W	1337	2 miles (3.2 km)	A tornado touched down in Resaca, injuring at least five people. The tornado caused at least $50,000 (1973 USD) in damages.
F1	Tallapoosa area	Gordon	33.75°N 85.28°W	1405	1 mile (1.6 km)	A tornado caused at least $5,000 (1973 USD) in damages.
F1	East Ellijay to N of Morganton	Gilmer, Fannin	34.68°N 84.48°W	1405	20 miles (32.2 km)	A tornado caused at least $50,000 (1973 USD) in damages.

=== March 17 event ===
List of confirmed tornadoes - Saturday, March 17, 1973
F#	Location	County	Coord.	Time (UTC)	Path length	Damage
Florida
F1	W of Treasure Island	Pinellas	27.77°N 82.78°W	0200	1 mile (1.6 km)	A waterspout tornado moved ashore to the town of Treasure Island. The tornado caused at least $5,000 (1973 USD) in damages.
F2	Zephyrhills area	Pasco	28.22°N 82.17°W	0245	0.3 miles (0.5 km)	A tornado injured one person and caused at least $5,000 (1973 USD) in damages.
F1	NE of Winter Haven	Polk	28.03°N 81.72°W	0300	0.5 miles (0.8 km)	A tornado caused at least $5,000 (1973 USD) in damages.
F2	WSW of Haines City	Polk	28.1°N 81.67°W	0300	0.3 miles (0.5 km)	A tornado caused at least $5,000 (1973 USD) in damages.
F1	SE of Sharpes	Brevard	28.42°N 80.75°W	0400	0.3 miles (0.5 km)	A tornado caused at least $500 (1973 USD) in damages.

=== March 23 event ===
List of confirmed tornadoes - Friday, March 23, 1973
F#	Location	County	Coord.	Time (UTC)	Path length	Damage
Texas
F2	NE of Dumont to Matador	Cottle, Motley	33.87°N 100.37°W	1430	24.7 miles (39.8 km)	A long-tracked tornado caused at least $5,000 (1973 USD) in damages.
F1	Girard area	Kent	33.33°N 100.73°W	1530	9.1 miles (14.6 km)	A tornado caused at least $500 (1973 USD) in damages.
F2	Amarillo area	Potter	35.22°N 101.88°W	1600	2 miles (3.2 km)	A brief tornado caused at least $5,000 (1973 USD) in damages.
F1	Sylvester area	Fisher	32.72°N 100.25°W	1600	0.5 miles (0.8 km)	A brief tornado caused at least $5,000 (1973 USD) in damages.
F2	Sweetwater area	Nolan	32.47°N 100.4°W	1600	3.3 miles (5.3 km)	A tornado caused at least $50,000 (1973 USD) in damages.
F0	S of Clyde	Callahan	32.35°N 99.5°W	1730	0.1 miles (0.2 km)	
F1	NNW of Carey	Childress	34.48°N 100.33°W	1800	1 mile (1.6 km)	A tornado caused at least $500 (1973 USD) in damages.
F0	Vidor area	Orange	30.13°N 94.03°W	1915	0.1 miles (0.2 km)	A tornado caused less than $50 (1973 USD) in damages.
F0	SSW of Coady	Chambers	29.75°N 95.03°W	1930	0.1 miles (0.2 km)	
F0	E of Brackettville	Kinney	29.3°N 100.3°W	2325	0.1 miles (0.2 km)	

=== March 24 event ===
List of confirmed tornadoes - Saturday, March 24, 1973
F#	Location	County	Coord.	Time (UTC)	Path length	Damage
Texas
F0	SSW of La Belle	Jefferson	29.85°N 94.17°W	0545	0.1 miles (0.2 km)	
Louisiana
F1	NNW of Chataignier to WNW of Ville Platte	Evangeline	30.6°N 92.33°W	0955	7.4 miles (11.9 km)	A tornado caused at least $50,000 (1973 USD) in damages.
F1	ENE of Maurepas	Livingston	30.3°N 90.6°W	1830	1 mile (1.6 km)	A tornado caused at least $5,000 (1973 USD) in damages.
Oklahoma
F0	ENE of Terral	Jefferson	33.9°N 97.9°W	1340	0.5 miles (0.8 km)	

=== March 28 event ===
List of confirmed tornadoes - Wednesday, March 28, 1973
F#	Location	County	Coord.	Time (UTC)	Path length	Damage
Oklahoma
F1	NNW of Centralia to WSW of Commerce	Craig, Ottawa	36.87°N 95.4°W	1640	28 miles (45.1 km)	A tornado caused at least $5,000 (1973 USD) in damages.

=== March 29 event ===
List of confirmed tornadoes - Thursday, March 29, 1973
F#	Location	County	Coord.	Time (UTC)	Path length	Damage
Texas
F1	NE of Plains	Yoakum	33.22°N 102.75°W	1700	0.3 miles (0.5 km)	A tornado caused at least $500 (1973 USD) in damages.

=== March 31 event ===
List of confirmed tornadoes - Saturday, March 31, 1973
F#	Location	County	Coord.	Time (UTC)	Path length	Damage
Missouri
F0	N of Clinton	Henry	38.42°N 93.78°W	1125	0.3 miles (0.5 km)	A tornado caused less than $50 (1973 USD) in damages.
Illinois
F1	NW of Merna	McLean	40.53°N 88.85°W	1519	0.1 miles (0.2 km)	A tornado caused at least $500 (1973 USD) in damages.
F0	SSE of Chenoa	McLean	40.7°N 88.7°W	1655	0.1 miles (0.2 km)	A tornado caused less than $50 (1973 USD) in damages.
F1	W of Rome	Peoria	40.88°N 89.58°W	1750	0.1 miles (0.2 km)	A tornado caused at least $500 (1973 USD) in damages.
F2	NE of Gilman	Iroquois	40.78°N 87.97°W	1800	0.1 miles (0.2 km)	A tornado caused at least $5,000 (1973 USD) in damages.
Georgia
F2+	Jonesboro to SW of Colbert	Clayton, Henry, Rockdale, Newton, Walton, Oconee, Clarke, Madison	33.53°N 84.33°W	1630	75.8 miles (122.0 km)	2 deaths – A very long-tracked tornado touched down in Jonesboro at around 4:30 p.m. The tornado badly damaged homes in Conyers and Monroe, but the worst damage occurred in Athens. Two people were killed in a trailer park and at least 70 others were injured. Several businesses, including a truck stop were destroyed. The damage still places the tornado at an F2+ rating because the truck stop wasn't anchored properly. Though some sources consider the tornado an F4, the tornado has never been given an official rating. The tornado weakened after it exited Athens and dissipated near Colbert. A tornado caused at least $50,000,000 (1973 USD) in damages.
South Carolina
F4	ESE of Calhoun Falls to S of Hodges	Abbeville, Greenwood	34.08°N 82.57°W	1820	22.6 miles (36.4 km)	7 deaths – A tornado struck Abbeville. The tornado caused at least $5,000,000 (1973 USD) in damages.
F2	ESE of Liberty	Pickens, Greenville	34.77°N 82.62°W	1900	12.4 miles (20.0 km)	A tornado caused at least $50,000 (1973 USD) in damages.

== See also ==
- Tornadoes of 1973
- List of United States tornadoes from January to February 1973
