= Tornadoes of 1973 =

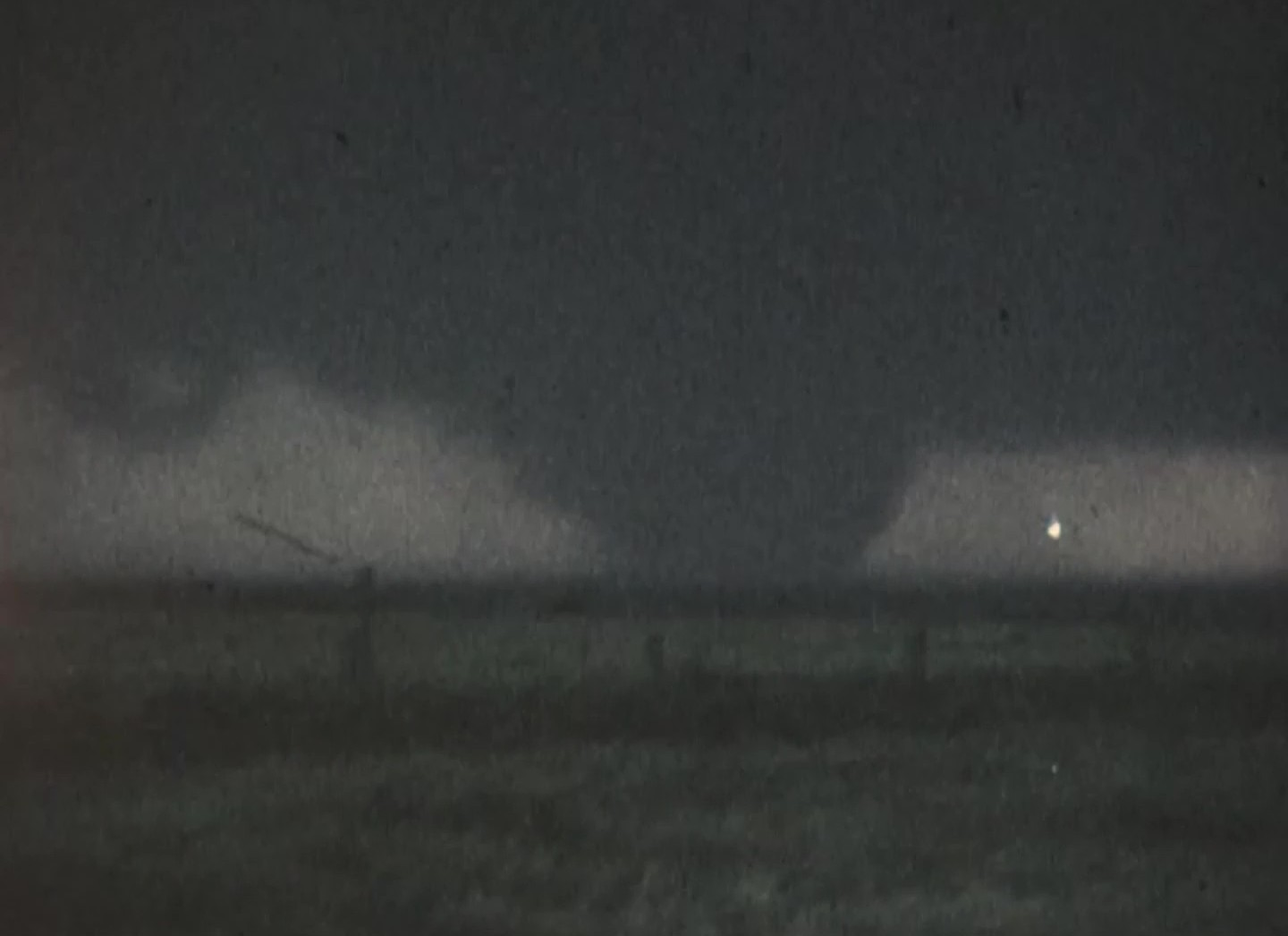
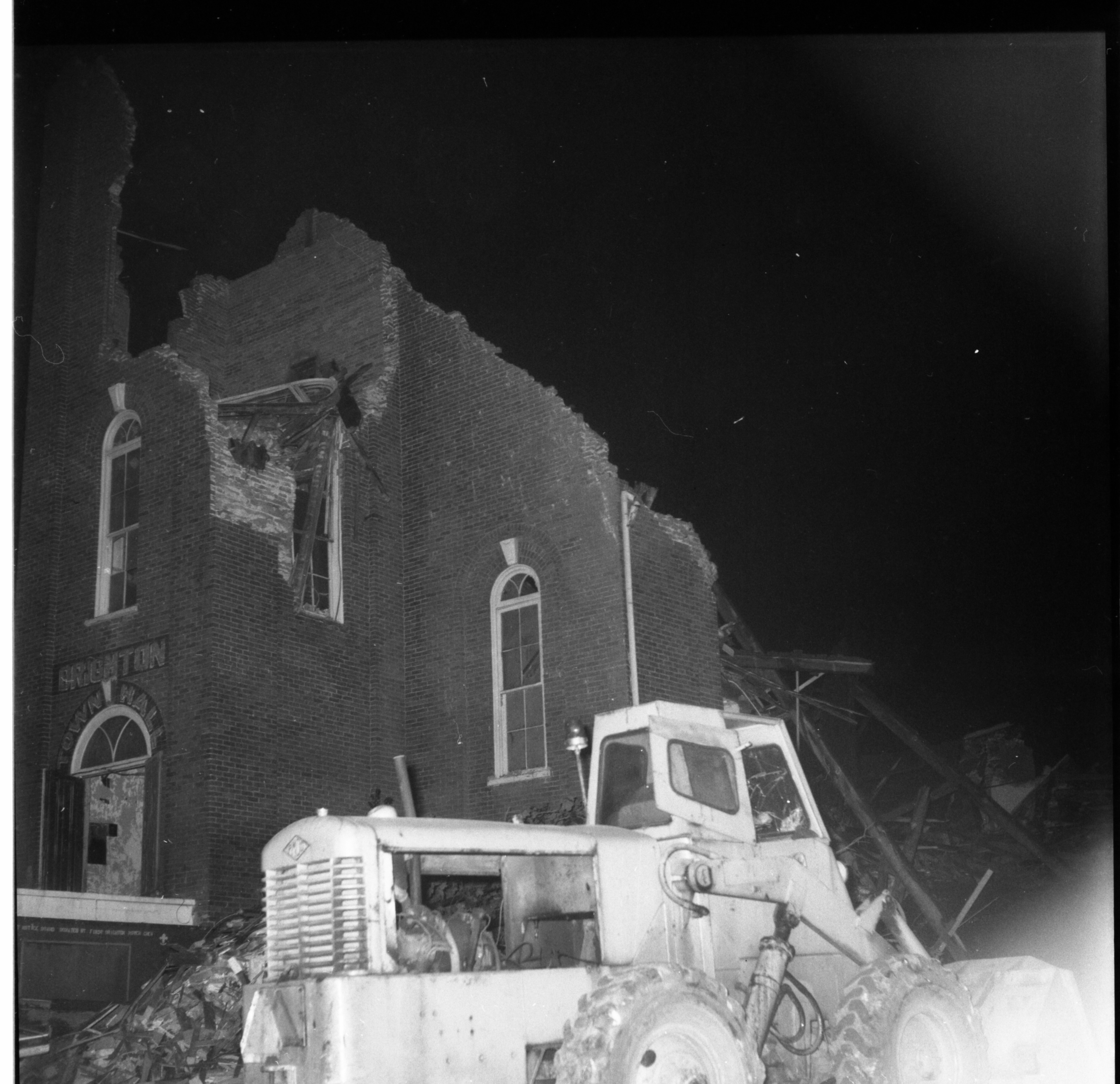
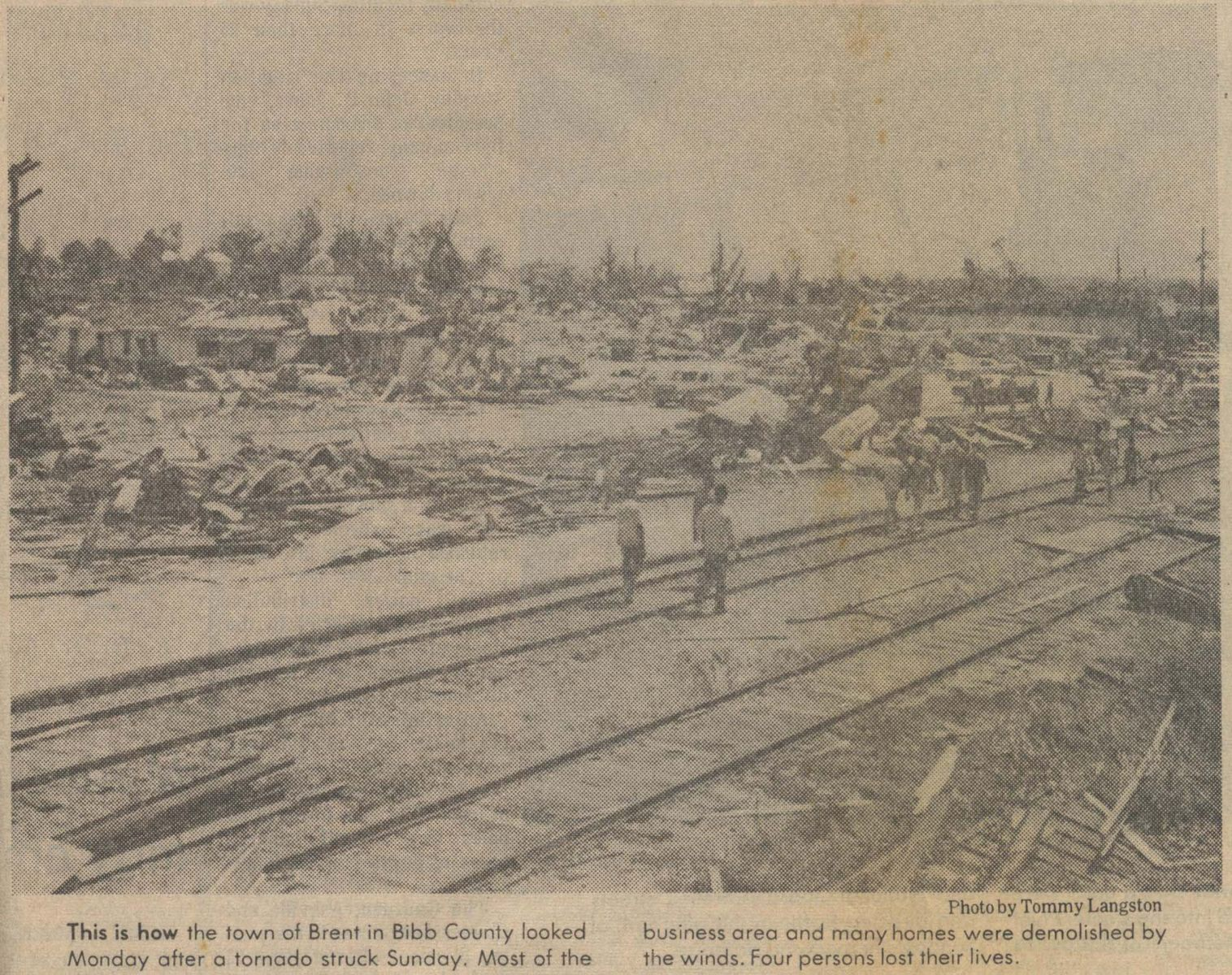
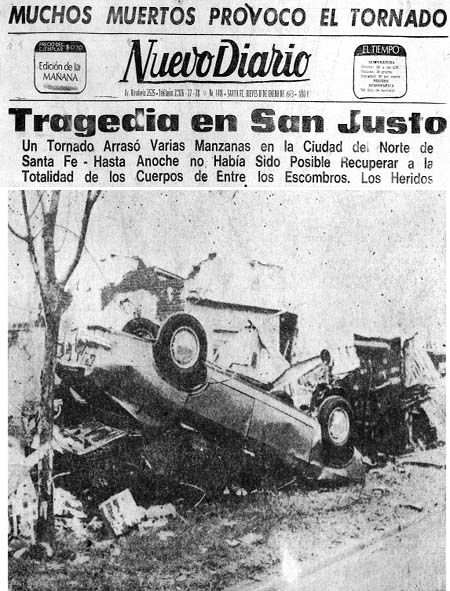
- Clockwise from top: A large F4 tornado near Pearsall, Texas on April 15; A high school in Jonesboro, Arkansas damaged by an F4 tornado on May 26; A newspaper showing a photo of damage in San Justo, Santa Fe after an F5 tornado on January 10; Researchers observing an F4 tornado near Union City, Oklahoma on May 24; Violent F4 damage in Brent, Alabama after a tornado on May 27; Damage to Brighton, Ontario's town hall after a tornado on July 13.
- Timespan: January 10–December 31, 1973
- Maximum rated tornado: F5 tornado: San Justo, Santa Fe, Argentina on January 10; Valley Mills, Texas on May 6
- Tornadoes in U.S.: 1,102
- Damage (U.S.): Unknown
- Fatalities (U.S.): 89
- Fatalities (worldwide): >833

This page documents notable tornadoes and tornado outbreaks worldwide in 1973, but mostly features events in the United States. According to tornado researcher Thomas P. Grazulis, documentation of tornadoes outside the United States was historically less exhaustive, owing to the lack of monitors in many nations and, in some cases, to internal political controls on public information. Most countries only recorded tornadoes that produced severe damage or loss of life. Consequently, available documentation in 1973 mainly covered the United States. On average, most recorded tornadoes, including the vast majority of significant—F2 (Note: The Fujita scale was devised under the aegis of scientist T. Theodore Fujita in the early 1970s. Prior to the advent of the scale in 1971, tornadoes in the United States were officially unrated. While the Fujita scale has been superseded by the Enhanced Fujita scale in the U.S. since February 1, 2007, Canada utilized the old scale until April 1, 2013; nations elsewhere, like the United Kingdom, apply other classifications such as the TORRO scale.) or stronger—tornadoes, form in the U.S., although as many as 500 may take place internationally. Some locations, like Bangladesh, are as prone to violent tornadoes as the U.S., meaning F4 or greater events on the Fujita scale.

Historically, the number of tornadoes globally and in the United States was and is likely underrepresented: research by Grazulis on annual tornado activity suggests that, as of 2001, only 53% of yearly U.S. tornadoes were officially recorded. Significant low biases in U.S. tornado counts likely occurred through the early 1990s, when advanced NEXRAD was first installed and the National Weather Service began comprehensively verifying tornado occurrences. Owing to increases in storm spotters, the number of tornadoes in the U.S. reached new heights in the early 1970s. 1973 was the first year in which more than 1,000 tornadoes were verified in the United States. The long-term annual mean for the U.S. is roughly 1,300 tornadoes each year, though Grazulis estimates that the real total may be close to 1,800. Despite having the highest annual total in the nation to date, 1973 failed to establish records in terms of significant or killer tornadoes—several earlier years had already done so.

Notable scientific milestones toward understanding the life cycle of tornadoes occurred in Oklahoma on May 24, 1973, when researchers exploited primitive Doppler weather radar, then under development by the National Severe Storms Laboratory (NSSL), to examine a tornado vortex signature, or TVS, for the first time in history. The scientists, in one of the earliest successful cases of storm chasing, were able to study the evolution of a violent tornado near Union City, and to generate clear visual photography of its entire life cycle, from birth to decay. The successful deployment of Doppler weather radar to detect tornado formation also pointed the way to the development of a nationwide Doppler radar system, and helped precipitate funding for studies on tornadogenesis.

== Synopsis ==
Fatal United States tornadoes in 1973
- Approximate touchdown location of killer tornadoes in 1973
Summary of tornadoes
- January 18 – Louisiana (1 death)
- March 10 – Texas (1 death)
- March 10 – Texas (6 deaths)
- March 15 – Tennessee (1 death)
- March 31 – Georgia (2 deaths)
- March 31 – South Carolina (7 deaths)
- April 15 – Texas (2 deaths)
- April 15 – Texas (5 deaths)
- April 20 – Arkansas (1 death)
- April 20 – Missouri (1 death)
- April 27 – North Carolina (1 death)
- May 1 – Missouri (2 deaths)
- May 8 – Alabama (2 deaths)
- May 9 – Minnesota (1 death)
- May 10 – Ohio (6 deaths)
- May 24 – Oklahoma (2 deaths)
- May 26 – Florida (1 death)
- May 26 – Kansas (3 deaths)
- May 26 – Oklahoma (5 deaths)
- May 26 – Arkansas (3 deaths)
- May 27 – Mississippi (1 death)
- May 27 – Alabama (7 deaths)
- May 27 – Alabama (1 death)
- May 28 – Georgia (1 death)
- June 18 – Iowa (2 deaths)
- June 24 – South Dakota (1 death)
- July 1 – South Dakota (1 death)
- August 28 – New York, Massachusetts (4 deaths)
- September 25 – Kansas, Nebraska (3 deaths)
- November 19 – Oklahoma (5 deaths)
- November 24 – Missouri (3 deaths)
- November 24 – Arkansas (1 death)
- November 24 – Missouri (2 deaths)
- November 27 – Mississippi (1 death)
- December 13 – South Carolina (2 deaths)
- December 13 – South Carolina (1 death)
Total fatalities: 89

At the beginning of the year, one of the strongest El Niño episodes since 1950, as defined by sea surface temperatures, was in progress but gradually diminishing, according to the Oceanic Niño Index (ONI). Peak trimonthly anomalies, measured in moving averages, were +1.7 °C above normal for the period December–February 1972 – 1973. The month of January featured clusters of tornado activity along the Gulf Coast, primarily in Texas and Louisiana, as well as part of the Florida peninsula—a pattern not inconsistent with that of El Niño winters in general. The deadliest and strongest tornado of the month was an F3 that struck Caldwell Parish, Louisiana, on January 18, killing one person and injuring two others. It was part of a larger outbreak on the same date that spawned five other significant tornadoes near the Gulf Coast, with 20 total injuries. A smaller outbreak affected Central Florida ten days later, causing damaging F2 tornadoes in the Campbell–Orlando area, with 24 injuries. February featured much less activity, with 10 confirmed tornadoes compared to 33 in January, and no destructive or deadly tornadoes occurred. Outside the U.S., a catastrophic tornado, believed to be an F5, ravaged a small town in Argentina on January 10, causing more than 50 deaths.

Intense tornado activity increased significantly across the U.S. in March, when the nation's first violent tornadoes of the year touched down in Texas and South Carolina. There were 17 deaths and 300 injuries by the end of the month, largely due to two major tornado outbreaks, and tornadoes occurred as far north as Kansas and Michigan. On March 10, an overnight outbreak concentrated in Texas produced a killer F4 tornado that devastated the small town of Hubbard, killing six people and injuring 77. On March 31, another outbreak spawned a long-lived supercell that tracked through northern Georgia, causing what was officially (Note: Subsequent reanalysis conducted by Harold E. Brooks concluded that the actual losses were about $89 million in contemporary U.S. dollars—matching the original losses reported in the monthly publication Storm Data.) that state's costliest natural disaster at the time, with prolific losses from a tornado centered in and near Conyers–Athens; damages reportedly reached $113 million in 1973 dollars. Despite the damage, the tornado was of only F2 intensity, (Note: A paper coauthored by Dr. Fujita in 1973 synthesized aerial photography and ground surveys to analyze the intensity and track of the tornado. It determined that the tornado, officially over 72 miles (116 km) in length, was likely a family of two events, each of which produced peak damage that was assigned an F4 rating.) and just two deaths were attributed to the tornado, with about 100 injuries. On the same date, a separate tornado in western South Carolina attained F4 strength, (Note: Fujita and Pearson's study in 1973 awarded an F5 rating to this tornado, which lofted an occupied motel across State Highway 72, causing it to shatter into pieces, killing four people then inside the structure. One segment was moved 200 feet (61 m) from its original location on the foundation.) killing seven people and injuring 30. In all, 80 tornadoes struck the U.S. in the month of March, 39 of which were F2 or greater.

The month of April was even more active, with 150 tornadoes and 73 F2+ events. The highest concentration of significant tornadoes was in Missouri, where 17 F2+ events occurred. The deadliest tornado of the month was a massive F4 on April 15 that produced intense damage to vehicles and an airport near Pearsall, Texas, killing five people and injuring 12. All of the dead were riding in vehicles, one of which contained eight occupants, mostly Mexicans. The tornado struck two cars traveling on Interstate 35 and lofted them into fields, where they were mangled so badly as to be unidentifiable as vehicles. On the same day, an F3 tornado near Plainview affected Interstate 27 and killed two people, one of whom was yet again inside a car: a monitor working for REACT was positioning himself when the tornado hurled his vehicle hundreds of yards. The latter part of April was extremely active, with a major tornado outbreak sequence on April 19–21 and smaller outbreaks on several other days. The period April 17–28 featured tornadoes on 11 consecutive days. The state of Missouri was hardest hit, with three F4 tornadoes each on April 19–21. There were two deaths during this period, one each in Missouri and Arkansas.

The following month, May, was the deadliest month of the year in the U.S., with 35 fatalities from tornadoes—22 of which took place in a three-day span on May 26–29. The nation's only F5 tornado of the year struck near Valley Mills, Texas, on May 6, where it swept away a few barns, leaving little debris on the foundations. Engineers assigned an F5 rating to the tornado because it lofted a pickup truck for a considerable distance. An outbreak over Ohio on May 10 included an F3 tornado that flattened mobile homes in three trailer courts near Willard, inflicting six deaths and 100 injuries. Deadly F4 tornadoes killed a combined seven people in Oklahoma on May 24 and 26, respectively, with significant impacts to the community of Keefton. An outbreak sequence produced continuous tornado activity from May 26–29, with no gap between tornadoes exceeding six hours. A destructive nighttime tornado, or series of tornadoes, ravaged Jonesboro, Arkansas, on May 26, injuring nearly 300 people, but surprisingly with only three deaths. The next day, a long-tracked, violent tornado crossed almost 140 mi (230 km) of central Alabama, obliterating most of the town of Brent, injuring about 200 people, and killing seven.

The remainder of the year featured a rare F4 tornado in New England that struck along the New York/Massachusetts state line on August 28, killing four people, injuring 36, and devastating a large truck stop in West Stockbridge, Massachusetts. An outbreak sequence consisting of several tornado families hit mainly Kansas and Nebraska on September 24–26, with three deaths and almost 60 injuries. At the end of the year, on December 20, Dade County, Florida, experienced one of its most damaging tornadoes to date when an F2 tornado passed through farmland near Homestead, with $800,000 in contemporary losses. In the United States, 1973 was the most active tornado year up to that time, with over 1,100 confirmed tornadoes. Tornadoes killed 89 people nationwide, which exceeded the annual average of about 60, and there were almost 2,400 injuries. Greg Carbin of the Storm Prediction Center (SPC), upon examining data maintained, concluded that strong El Niño events—as measured by the multivariate ENSO index—may foster better conditions for more tornadoes.

== Events ==
=== United States yearly total ===
Confirmed tornadoes by Fujita rating
FU	F0	F1	F2	F3	F4	F5	Total
0	219	497	301	71	13	1	1,102

== January ==
33 tornadoes were confirmed in January in the United States.

=== January 10 (Argentina) ===
A large and violent but short-lived tornado caused at least 63 direct deaths and 350 injuries as it devastated the town of San Justo in Santa Fe Province, Argentina. The tornado, which traversed the west side of the town, headed south-southwest for about 1.5 km (0.93 mi) before dissipating, produced peak winds in excess of 261 mph (420 km/h), and attained a peak width of over 300 m (330 yd), leaving over 2000 people homeless. The tornado affected 500 homes in its path, many of which were leveled or severely damaged, along with a hotel and a car dealership. A press report indicated that numerous homes were swept clean from their concrete foundations. Reportedly, the tornado hurled dozens of vehicles like "ping-pong balls," including an occupied car that flew 30 ft (9.1 m) through the air, with four fatalities from single family being later found hanged on trees. Several vehicles were thrown for at least 200 m (220 yd) and mangled beyond recognition. One vehicle was lofted 50 m (55 yd) above the ground and "disintegrated"; its motor was later found embedded in a concrete wall about 100 m (110 yd) away. Additionally, a 10 t (22,000 lb) tractor was found in a wooded area 500 m (550 yd) from its origin, and immense trees were torn from the ground and thrown. Furthermore, grass was reportedly ripped from the ground and a pond outside of town was sucked dry. The tornado, which was officially rated F5 in 2017, was the most violent ever reported in Argentina and Southern Hemisphere, and caused great economic loss. The economic cost of this disaster was about $60,000.

=== January 18 ===
FU	F0	F1	F2	F3	F4	F5
0	2	2	5	1	0	0

An outbreak of 10 tornadoes largely affected the Mississippi Valley on January 18, though scattered activity occurred as far west as the town of Seminole in Oklahoma, where an F2 tornado damaged several structures, vehicles, and electrical wires, injuring four people mildly, as well as toppling trees. There was one deadly tornado in the outbreak: an F3 that touched down near Corey, Louisiana, in Caldwell Parish, and lofted a poorly built tenant home for 100 yards (91 m), causing the death of a young woman and injuring her child and another person. The parent supercell later continued into Richland Parish, with a path length totaling 38 miles (61.2 km). Another tornado, an F2, struck Tallulah, wrecking a self-service laundry and causing roof damage to five homes, resulting in four minor injuries. The largest number of injuries in a single tornado on January 18 occurred in Mississippi, where an F2 near Stallo flipped trailers and a business, both of which shattered, injuring eight people. Two of the injured were hurled from the structure in which they were standing. In all, the entire outbreak spawned tornadoes as far north as southern Illinois, injured 20 people, and killed one.

=== January 20–22 ===
FU	F0	F1	F2	F3	F4	F5
0	2	11	4	0	0	0

A localized outbreak of mostly weak tornadoes affected parts of Central and Northeast Texas on January 20–21. Around mid-afternoon on January 20, an F2 tornado developed near Bullard in Smith County, injuring one person and damaging crops. Early on January 21, shortly after midnight CST, another F2 tornado struck the community of James in Shelby County, badly damaging several homes, with three injuries. On January 21–22, the storm system that produced the outbreak headed east, generating additional tornadoes over the Florida Panhandle and Central Florida. On January 21, an F0 tornado near Pensacola caused slight damage to an awning on a mobile home. The next day, an F1 tornado that struck Lithia wrecked several trailers, causing eight injuries. In all, the entire outbreak produced 17 tornadoes and 12 injuries.

=== January 28 ===
FU	F0	F1	F2	F3	F4	F5
0	0	1	3	0	0	0

Central Florida experienced a small but significant tornado outbreak (Note: The threshold of a tornado outbreak varies by geographic region. For most of the U.S., an outbreak is defined as a swarm of at least six to ten tornadoes, with no gap between touchdowns of more than six hours. On the Florida peninsula, an outbreak consists of at least four tornadoes occurring relatively synchronously—no more than four hours apart.) on January 28. The most destructive of the four tornadoes on this day struck the Kissimmee and Orlando areas. An F2 tornado affected Campbell and the Idora Park section of Kissimmee, causing significant damage to about 300 homes, with seven injuries. Another F2 tornado struck the southwestern side of Orlando, where it removed the roof and wrecked several units of a multi-story apartment complex. The tornado damaged almost 230 homes and businesses, along with numerous vehicles, leaving hundreds of residents homeless and 16 (possibly 25) injured. An F1 tornado damaged mobile homes near Dade City, injuring one person, and an F2 tornado snapped an airway beacon at the Titusville–Cocoa Airport, where it also damaged an airport terminal. The entire outbreak injured 24 people.

== February ==
10 tornadoes were reported in February in the United States.

== March ==
80 tornadoes were reported in March in the United States.

=== March 9–11 ===
FU	F0	F1	F2	F3	F4	F5
0	1	6	7	2	1	0

A relatively small but deadly tornado outbreak mainly affected Texas during the overnight period of March 9–10, though other tornadoes from the same storm system struck Mississippi, Arkansas, and Wisconsin on March 10–11. Shortly before daybreak on March 10, the deadliest tornado of the outbreak, a violent F4, caused six deaths and 77 injuries in and near Hubbard, Texas, with severe destruction in the town itself, which lost about half of its business district and one-third of the remainder of town. Also in Texas, an F2 tornado killed one person and injured seven near Grape Creek, where it wrecked mobile homes. Another tornado in Texas, an F3, affected about 200 homes and businesses, many of which were razed, in the town of Burnet, with 40 injuries. Yet another F3 tornado in the state injured three people as it leveled barns and farmhouses near Pottsboro, where it also moved objects for distances ranging from 100 yd (91 m) to a mile. Altogether, the tornadoes from the entire severe weather event killed seven people and injured 132.

=== March 13–15 ===
FU	F0	F1	F2	F3	F4	F5
0	2	5	10	0	0	0

A minor tornado outbreak produced several significant tornadoes across Oklahoma, Kansas, Texas, and Missouri. An F2 tornado that formed near Geronimo, Oklahoma, was responsible for most of the injuries on this day as it damaged mobile homes and roofs, injuring five people. Another F2 tornado developed near Ponca City and lifted near Atlanta, Kansas, causing severe damage to many barns and homes. Downbursts accompanied the tornado, and the combined effects caused $1 million in losses. Yet a third F2 tornado touched down near Branson in Missouri and leveled several trailers adjourning Table Rock Lake, with four injuries. It also submerged many boats near the shoreline. The large-scale weather system that spawned the outbreak headed east, producing a brief but damaging F2 tornado on March 15 near Taft, Tennessee, that damaged trees, a manufacturer, and several homes, with three injuries. One person died at the manufacturer as its roof was lifted off, crushing a security guard. During the severe weather event, 17 tornadoes touched down, one person died, and 14 people were injured.

=== March 16–17 ===
FU	F0	F1	F2	F3	F4	F5
0	0	7	8	0	0	0

A progressive outbreak sequence affected the Southeastern U.S. on March 16–17. On March 16, activity occurred in Alabama and Georgia. An F2 tornado affected Helena in Alabama, with extensive damage to several mobile homes and a commercial center. Five injuries, none of which was life-threatening, occurred. In Georgia, another F2 tornado hit the Resaca area, where severe damage was reported to structures and a vehicle was overturned. Five people were injured there as well. On March 17, five tornadoes struck Central Florida, including two F2 events, with one injury. The entire outbreak sequence caused 12 injuries but no fatalities.

=== March 23–24 ===
FU	F0	F1	F2	F3	F4	F5
0	6	5	3	0	0	0

A minor tornado outbreak commenced on March 23, with additional tornadoes the following day. It affected Texas, Louisiana, and Oklahoma, but did not produce any deaths or injuries. The most significant tornado was an F2 that tracked for about 25 mi (40.2 km) across northern Texas, near Roaring Springs.

=== March 31 ===
FU	F0	F1	F2	F3	F4	F5
0	2	2	3	0	1	0

A small but significant tornado outbreak on March 31 produced its most severe damage in Georgia and South Carolina, though other tornadoes struck Missouri and Illinois. An extremely destructive, long-tracked tornado caused the costliest natural disaster in Georgia history up to that time, though officially it only produced F2 damage. A survey by Ted Fujita concluded that the tornado produced F4 damage and was two distinct events in a family, not a single tornado. At least two people died and 100 were injured in Georgia, mainly near Conyers and Athens, though Grazulis mentioned a third death that is not officially documented. An F4 tornado killed seven people, mostly in a motel, in the Calhoun Falls–Abbeville area of South Carolina, where it affected well over 100 homes and injured 30 people. At the time, Fujita assigned an F5 rating to the tornado in South Carolina, but it was later downgraded to F4.

== April ==
150 tornadoes were reported in April in the United States.

=== April 17 ===
Two F3 tornadoes touched down in the Lake Charles area, injuring one person.

=== April 17 (Bangladesh) ===
One of the deadliest tornadoes to strike Bangladesh leveled large swaths of Balur Char and other locations in the Manikganj District. At least 681 fatalities occurred, though unverifiable estimates exceeded 1,000. Reportedly, observers witnessed twin funnels that combined to form a single, large tornado. At least eight villages were nearly obliterated as the tornado tracked near the Kaliganga River. The tornado is believed to have been "violent" (at least F4 in intensity).

=== April 19–21 ===
FU	F0	F1	F2	F3	F4	F5
0	4	26	26	9	3	0

An expansive, major tornado outbreak sequence spawned 68 tornadoes, including 38 significant events, on April 19–21. Tornadoes affected the states of Arkansas, Tennessee, Kansas, Missouri, Kentucky, South Dakota, Iowa, Illinois, North Dakota, and Oklahoma. On April 19, an F3 tornado struck Batesville in Arkansas, where structures were dislodged from their foundations or sustained collapse of their walls. 18 injuries occurred in town. Early on April 20, another F3 tornado struck the Ada area in Oklahoma, damaging about 500 structures and several aircraft. Numerous homes and a trailer park were razed, leaving 21 people injured. Later that morning, yet another F3 tornado hit near Harrison, Arkansas, where one fatality occurred and many homes disintegrated, with 19 injuries. An F2 tornado flattened barns and trailers near Sedalia, Missouri, dispersing debris for a few miles and injuring eight (possibly 13) people. Six injuries (possibly 12) occurred in an F3 tornado near Lockwood that leveled some homes and lofted debris for up to 35 mi (56.3 km). The strongest tornado of the day attained F4 intensity near La Plata, where one home disintegrated and was swept from its foundation, causing one death. Three injuries occurred as well. Two other F4 tornadoes struck Missouri on April 19 and 21, respectively. On the latter date, an F2 tornado in the Parnell–Holbrook area in Iowa struck 25 farms in its path, tearing off roofs, leveling several barns, and causing one home to slide and buckle. The tornado injured six (possibly only one) people. In all, the entire outbreak sequence killed two people and injured 106.

=== April 23–25 ===
FU	F0	F1	F2	F3	F4	F5
0	1	13	9	1	0	0

A small outbreak of tornadoes mainly impacted Texas and Arkansas on April 23–24, with additional tornadoes farther east on April 25. On April 23, a brief tornado traveled 2.5 mi (4.0 km) through Cleburne, Texas, producing F3-level damage as roofs were removed. Three people were injured in Cleburne. Just before dawn on April 24, another F2 tornado caused extensive damage to parts of Texarkana, injuring eight people and producing losses of nearly $2 million in 1973 U.S. dollars. Later that morning, a third F2 tornado struck a school in Sumner, Mississippi, leveling temporary structures and injuring 42 people. Minor tornadoes struck Tennessee, Florida, and Georgia on April 25. The entire severe weather event injured 59 people.

=== April 26–27 ===
FU	F0	F1	F2	F3	F4	F5
0	2	3	4	1	0	0

Another small outbreak on April 26–27 spawned tornadoes mostly along the Gulf Coast from Texas to Florida, with isolated tornadoes elsewhere. On April 26, an F3 tornado struck a lumberyard near Baton Rouge, Louisiana, producing extensive damage to the area. An F1 tornado injured six people near Panama City Beach, Florida. A deadly F2 tornado struck the Burbage Crossroads area in North Carolina on April 27, killing one person and injuring another. The entire severe weather event caused one fatality and nine injuries.

=== April 30–May 1 ===
FU	F0	F1	F2	F3	F4	F5
0	3	8	6	1	0	0

A localized outbreak sequence—concentrated over Oklahoma, Kansas, Missouri, and Arkansas—occurred on April 30–May 1. An F2 tornado struck the outskirts of White Deer, Texas, tearing roofs from homes and flattening many trailers, with three injuries. A separate F2 tornado damaged several structures, including a café, as it passed over part of the Great Salt Plains Lake and tracked near Medford in Oklahoma, inflicting six injuries. On May 1, a low-end F2 tornado hit Siloam Springs, Arkansas, toppling several structures, including a broiler facility, and causing four injuries in the area. Later that day, the strongest tornado of the outbreak sequence produced F3 damage near Kahoka, Missouri, where it removed most walls from a home, killed two people in mobile homes, and injured 20. The outbreak sequence injured 33 people.

== May ==
250 tornadoes were reported in May in the United States.

=== May 6–8 ===
FU	F0	F1	F2	F3	F4	F5
0	9	15	21	1	0	1

An extensive tornado outbreak sequence on May 6–8 produced tornadoes from the High Plains to the Southeast. On May 6, an F2 tornado in eastern Colorado caused five injuries, one of which was severe, as it wrecked and tossed a mobile home for 150 yd (140 m). Later that day, the only F5 tornado of the year in the U.S. touched down near Valley Mills, Texas, leveling a few barns, with only scant debris left on the foundations. Engineers assigned an F5 rating, however, based on the lofting of a pickup truck for .5 mi (0.8 km). There were no casualties, making this the only F5/EF5 tornado in the US to not cause any casualties. The next day, May 7, an F3 tornado affected the vicinity of Poplar Bluff, Missouri, where it tipped over boxcars, flattened a barn, and turned a home that stayed on its foundation. Seven injuries occurred. On May 8, a long-tracked F2 tornado traveled almost 30 mi (48.3 km) through the Guntersville–Rainsville area in Alabama, damaging or destroying numerous structures, killing two people, and injuring 12. The entire outbreak sequence produced 47 tornadoes, killing two, and injuring 41.

=== May 9–10 ===
FU	F0	F1	F2	F3	F4	F5
0	1	11	4	2	0	0

A deadly tornado outbreak affected the state of Ohio on May 10, though tornado activity began as early as May 9 in Minnesota.

FU	F0	F1	F2	F3	F4	F5
0	1	0	0	0	1	0

=== May 24 ===
On May 24, a well-documented F4 tornado killed two and injured four in Union City, Oklahoma.

=== May 26–27 ===
FU	F0	F1	F2	F3	F4	F5
0	25	64	41	10	3	0

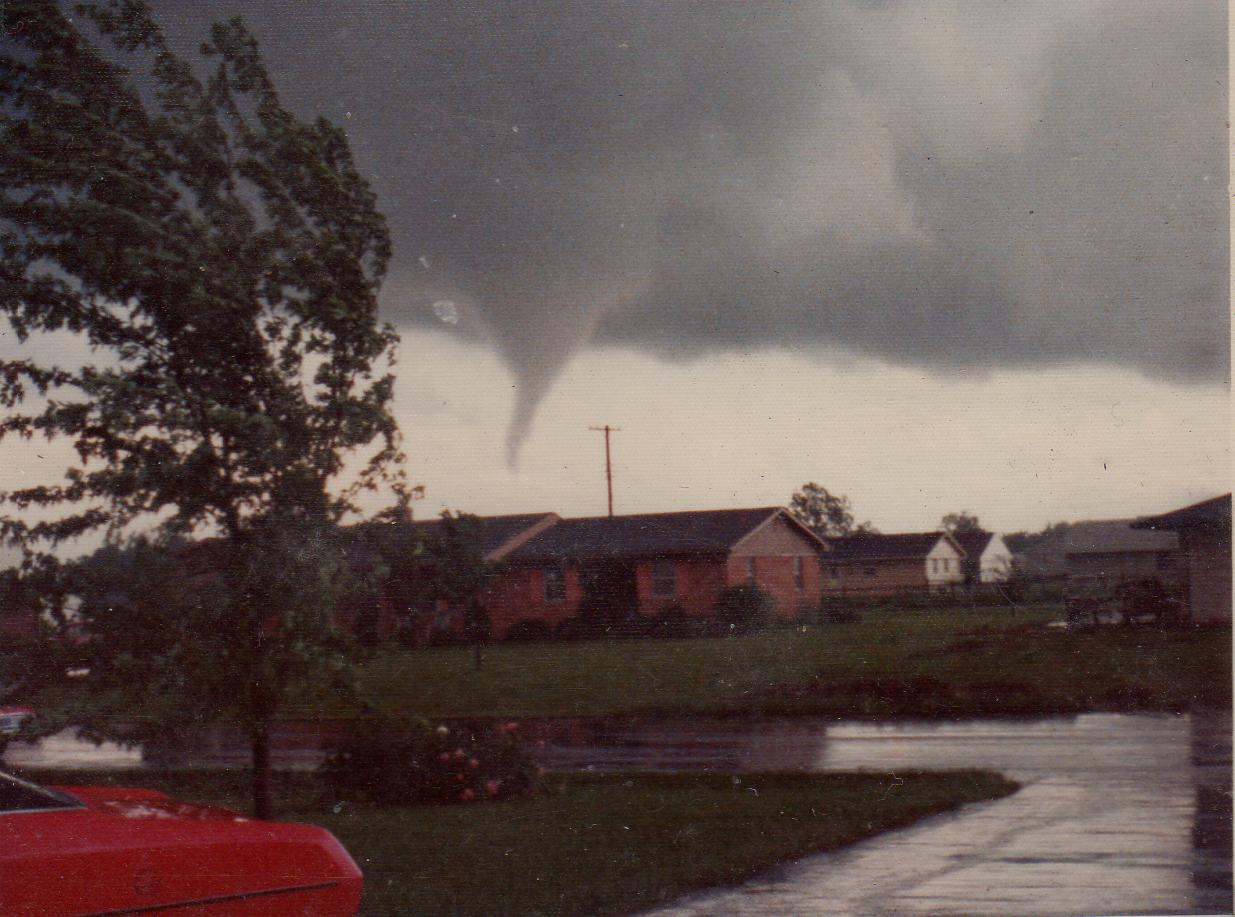
An F2 tornado in Greenwood, Indiana on May 27.

On May 26, a tornado was captured on time-lapse as it spun on the southwest edge of the storm west of Wichita, Kansas. The tornado would cause F3 damage to three homes north of Goddard. Three people were killed when a F1 tornado picked up a 19-foot boat and threw it back in the water before uprooting trees at shore in Cheney Reservoir. A F4 tornado damaged 75% of Keefeton, Oklahoma and tossed a pickup truck where all four occupants died. That same day, another long-tracked F4 tornado in Northeastern Arkansas killed three and injured 289. One more disastrous, long-tracked F4 tornado occurred the next day in Central Alabama south of Birmingham, Alabama, killing seven and injuring 199 (208 according to Grazulis). A F3 tornado (part of the tornado family originating from Walton County) struck northern Athens, Georgia with one fatality and 65 injuries. In the end, the tornadoes caused 24 fatalities and 820 injuries.

== June ==
224 tornadoes were reported in June in the United States.

== July ==
80 tornadoes were reported in July in the United States.

== August ==
51 tornadoes were reported in August in the United States.

=== August 28 ===
FU	F0	F1	F2	F3	F4	F5
0	0	0	0	0	1	0

At approximately 1 p.m. (EDT), an F4 tornado touched down in Canaan, New York and moved in a south-southeast direction across the Massachusetts state line into the town of West Stockbridge, Massachusetts. It caused significant damage to the Berkshire Farm for Boys in Canaan then “obliterated” nearly every house in its path in West Stockbridge. Finally, it leveled the Berkshire Truck Stop on Massachusetts Route 102 near the Massachusetts Turnpike, overturning and throwing trucks and cars and ripping gas pumps out of their stands. When it was over, four people had been killed (including three at the truck stop), 36 were injured, and approximately $25 million ($148 million, 2021 USD) in damage had been done.

== September ==
69 tornadoes were reported in September in the United States.

=== September 24–25 ===
FU	F0	F1	F2	F3	F4	F5
0	2	4	4	17	1	0

The outbreak starts with a high end F3 tornado that hit Fredonia, Kansas where six homes were destroyed while 36 others were damaged, a near-F4 damage was recorded in a farm house, six were injured by this tornado. A F3 tornado struck Vinita, Oklahoma where eight farms sustained damage, seven homes were unroofed or destroyed while other homes were damaged and a car was thrown and rolled 150 yards, 14 were injured by this tornado. A F2 tornado destroyed three homes and outbuildings on five farms near Xenia, Kansas. The next day features a complex tornado family that causes minor to significant damage in Bennington, Kansas (two injuries) and Hanover, Kansas before moving to Nebraska and tore apart many farms with one of them sustaining high end F4 (near-F5) damage, 10 were injured by this tornado family and the tornado family left 2 million dollar losses in damage. A widely visible intense (F3) tornado destroyed dozens of barns in Saline County, Kansas before moving through the south edge of Salina where it destroyed two homes and destroying many trailers in a trailer park before moving to New Cambria where homes were torn apart or unroofed with two injuries, the tornado left no deaths and six injuries (four in a trailer park while two others in New Cambria). The first deadly tornado on that day was a F3 tornado (officially listed as single tornado although Grazulis listed it as separate event which was related to the previous event) that struck Niles, Kansas where eight homes were torn apart with three destroyed at F3 intensity, most of the damage done by this tornado were from the huge steel grain bins that were hurled to the town. One was killed and two others were injured. The deadliest tornado of the outbreak was what was officially listed as two long tracked tornadoes (listed as a family of eight or more tornadoes by Grazulis) that hit Clay Center, Kansas where many homes suffered significant damage with some destroyed at F3 intensity while damaging hospital, 22 were injured in Clay Center before the tornado moved to Greenleaf where every homes and businesses were either damaged or destroyed, two were killed and. This tornado or another related tornado struck Hanover about two hours after the earlier tornado. The outbreak ends with a F2 tornado that destroyed a barn in Union, Nebraska. In the end, the outbreak spawned eight tornadoes while leaving three deaths and 66 injuries.

== October ==
25 tornadoes were reported in October in the United States.

== November ==
81 tornadoes were reported in November in the United States.

=== November 4 (Australia) ===
FU	F0	F1	F2	F3	F4	F5
0	0	0	0	1	0	0

On 4 November, the Australian city of Brisbane was struck by an intense F3 tornado–one that is believed to be the costliest in the country's history. The tornado spawned around Brookfield, Queensland at approximately 6:10pm local time (8:10am UTC), and as it travelled towards the coast, the storm damaged 600 houses, hospitalized 12 people, injured 20 and gave 100 people cuts from flying debris. Some say the tornado potentially wiped one house completely off its foundation. The storm lasted for about one hour in total, travelling 51 km (32 mi) across its lifespan and reached a maximum width of 230 m (250 yd). The tornado's final damages were about $2 million in nominal AUD.

== December ==
49 tornadoes were reported in December in the United States.

=== December 13 ===
An F4 tornado killed two people in Greenwood, South Carolina. Three F3s and two F2s were also associated with the outbreak.

== See also ==
- Tornado
  - Tornadoes by year
  - Tornado records
  - Tornado climatology
  - Tornado myths
- Tornado intensity
  - Fujita scale
  - Enhanced Fujita scale
- List of tornado outbreaks
  - List of F5 and EF5 tornadoes
  - List of North American tornadoes and tornado outbreaks
  - List of 21st-century Canadian tornadoes and tornado outbreaks
  - List of European tornadoes and tornado outbreaks
  - List of tornadoes and tornado outbreaks in Asia
  - List of Southern Hemisphere tornadoes and tornado outbreaks
  - List of tornadoes striking downtown areas
