= 1973 Jonesboro tornado =

Weather event in Arkansas, United States

- Damage to the Jonesboro High School's main building

Meteorological history
- Formed: May 26, 1973

F4 tornado
- on the Fujita scale
- Highest winds: 210 to 261 mph (338 to 420 km/h)

Overall effects
- Fatalities: 3
- Injuries: 289
- Part of the tornado outbreaks of 1973

In the early morning hours of May 26, 1973, a destructive tornado moved through the Jonesboro metropolitan area in the U.S. state of Arkansas, killing three people and injuring over 280 others.

== Summary ==
On the Jonesboro High School campus, every building but the gymnasium was destroyed. Most buildings in Jonesboro's main shopping district were either completely destroyed or were heavily damaged. The Arkansas State University narrowly avoided being hit by the tornado.

5 inches of rain fell in the hours following the tornado, affecting crops.

== Aftermath ==
$37 million in damage was inflicted by the tornado in Jonesboro alone, with a further $110,00 in damage being inflicted in Jackson County. According to an estimate from the International Red Cross and Red Crescent Movement, 2,000 homes suffered major damage as a result of the tornado.

Three people were killed by the tornado: one near the Otwell community in Craighead County, one in Weiner, and another in Jonesboro. 171 people were treated for tornadic injuries at the St. Bernard's Hospital in Jonesboro.

The tornado was the last in Jonesboro until 2020, when an EF3 tornado affected the city's northeastern portions.

== See also ==
- List of F4, EF4, and IF4 tornadoes
- 1973 Central Alabama tornado

== Sources ==
- Grazulis, Thomas P. (May 1984). Violent Tornado Climatography, 1880–1982. OSTI (Technical report). NUREG. Washington, D.C.: Nuclear Regulatory Commission. OSTI 7099491. CR-3670.
- — (November 1990). Significant Tornadoes 1880–1989. Vol. 2. St. Johnsbury, Vermont: The Tornado Project of Environmental Films. ISBN 978-1-879362-02-4.
