= 1973 San Justo tornado =

1973 tornado in Argentina

Coordinates: 30.788301°S 60.598524°W

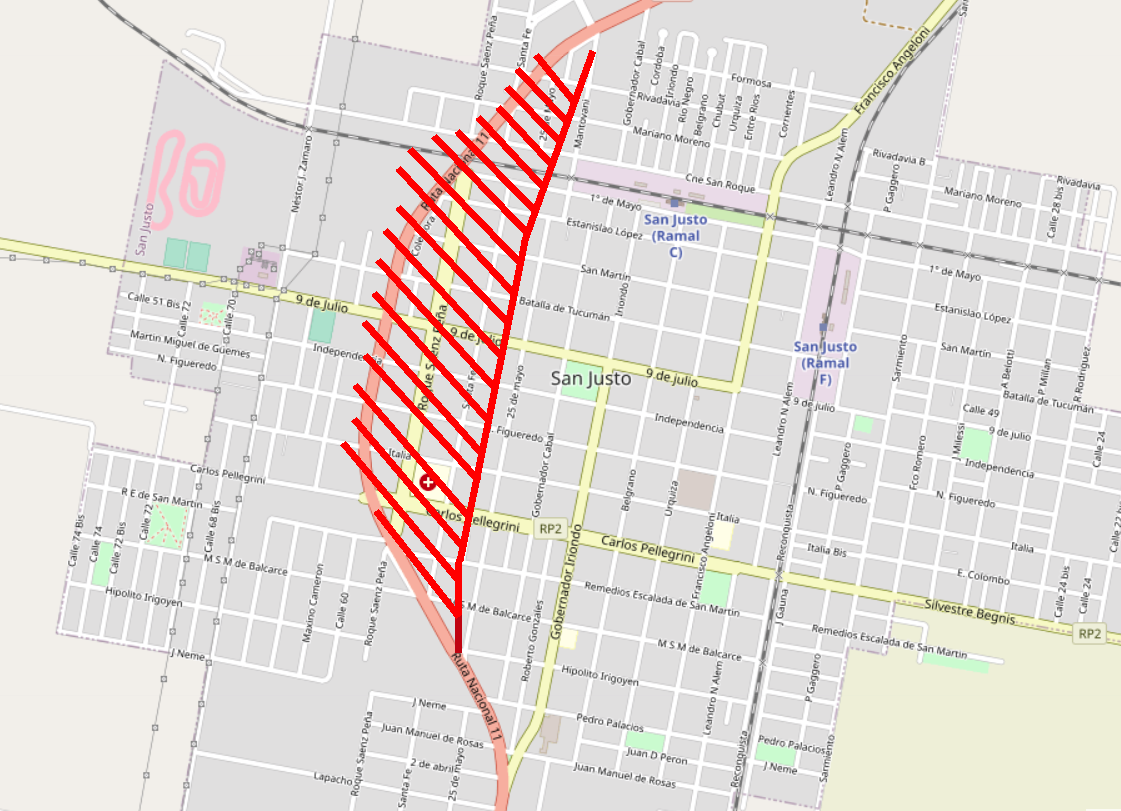
- Plan of the city of San Justo. The striped part shows the area most affected by the tornado.

Meteorological history
- Formed: 10 January 1973, 2:15 p.m. ART (UTC-03:00)
- Dissipated: 10 January 1973, 2:25 p.m. ART (UTC-03:00)
- Duration: 10 minutes

F5 tornado
- on the Fujita scale
- Max width: 300 m (330 yd)
- Path length: 1.5 km (0.93 mi)
- Highest winds: >261 mph (420 km/h)

Overall effects
- Fatalities: 63
- Injuries: 350
- Damage: ~$60,000 (~$440,000 in 2025 USD)
- Areas affected: San Justo, Santa Fe, Argentina
- Part of the tornadoes of 1973

The 1973 San Justo tornado was an extremely powerful and deadly F5 tornado which struck San Justo, a town in the province of Santa Fe, Argentina, on January 10, 1973. At least 63 people were reported dead and 350 were reported injured as it cut a 330-yard-wide (300 m) swath through the town. It was the most violent tornado ever recorded in South America, and also the entire Southern Hemisphere. This tornado was widely considered to have been an F5 on the Fujita Scale, and in 2017, it received its official F5 rating. The tornado had an economic cost of about $60,000 and was the deadliest tornado in Argentina's history. The tornado is the only F5 tornado to have been reported in Argentina.

== Meteorological synopsis ==
After a morning of intense heat, at noon, huge cumulonimbus clouds were seen forming and traveling in the direction of San Justo. Due to the high relative humidity content and extreme instability, around 13:00 local time, the clouds produced some isolated rainfalls.

== Tornado summary ==
Then, at about 14:15 local time, a tornado touched down in an open field. Slowly tracking to the south-southwest, the tornado killed several heads of a livestock, tossing cows over 30 m (98 ft) into the air and downed power poles. Several outbuildings were destroyed and lagoon was sucked dry before the tornado crossed the General Belgrano Railroad tracks and entered into town. According to eyewitnesses, the ground was shaking, "as if several jet planes were landing over the houses". The tornado quickly became extremely violent, reaching F5 intensity a few minutes later. The tornado reached a maximum width of 300 m (980 ft) and tore through western part of the San Justo, wrecking multiple factories and over 500 homes, leveling or sweeping clean some homes entirely. "Like ping pong balls", vehicles were thrown hundreds of yards and mangled beyond recognition, and grass was reportedly ripped from the ground. A newspaper image showed a vehicle motor that was embedded into a poured concrete wall by the tornado. A 10 t (22,000 lb) tractor was found in a wooded area 500 m (1,600 ft) away from the dealership where it originated. Large trees were torn out of the ground and flew "like matchsticks". A trailer was buried in a 2-metre-wide (6.6 ft) ditch.

As the tornado passed through the town, it turned more to the southwest. Crossing the National Route 11, the tornado struck a family car, lofting it 30 ft (9.1 m) into the air. Three children, man and woman were ejected from the car. The woman sustained only minor injuries, but man and children were killed and thrown 600 metres (660 yd) into eucalyptus forest, where hundreds of trees were snapped or debarked; their bodies were later found hanged on trees, being "unrecognizable and stripped of clothes". The tornado abruptly weakened and dissipated seven minutes after reaching F5 intensity. The tornado traveled for at least 1.5 kilometres (0.9 mi), killed 63 people along its path, and caused millions of pesos in damage.

The tornado is said by most locals to have changed color multiple times while crossing through San Justo, something that is very unusual for tornadoes to do. The tornado began with a unique violet color, then turned red as it devastated brick homes, with the color being caused by the brick dust it picked up. The tornado destroyed many wooden planks, and turned them into projectiles, which were what caused most of the fatalities.

== Aftermath ==
The supercell that spawned the tornado continued to produce very violent rain for another hour, and then rescue efforts were started immediately afterwards. The local San Justo Hospital was turned into a morgue, with bodies waiting to be identified. Most of the victims were reportedly rendered unrecognizable or caked in mud. Radio communications were cut, and San Justo was left without electricity for some time. The tornado left over 2000 people homeless due to the extreme house damage. Dr. Ted Fujita studied this tornado, and called it "the worst tornado ever recorded in the world outside the borders of the United States."

In 2013, a memorial was erected near the intersection of Roque Sáenz Peña boulevard and May 1st street for those who perished and their relatives.

In 2018, a group of sanjustinos made a documentary film entitled Vorágine about the experience of 3 relatives of tornado casualties. The film was directed by Fernando Molinas and produced by Imanol Sánchez.

== Sources ==
- Agee, Ernest M.; Childs, Samuel (June 1, 2014). "Adjustments in Tornado Counts, F-Scale Intensity, and Path Width for Assessing Significant Tornado Destruction". Journal of Applied Meteorology and Climatology. 53 (6). American Meteorological Society: 1494–1505. Bibcode:2014JApMC..53.1494A. doi:10.1175/JAMC-D-13-0235.1.
- Brooks, Harold E. (April 2004). "On the Relationship of Tornado Path Length and Width to Intensity". Weather and Forecasting. 19 (2): 310–19. Bibcode:2004WtFor..19..310B. doi:10.1175/1520-0434(2004)019<0310:OTROTP>2.0.CO;2.
- Cook, A. R.; Schaefer, J. T. (August 2008). "The Relation of El Niño–Southern Oscillation (ENSO) to Winter Tornado Outbreaks". Monthly Weather Review. 136 (8): 3121–3137. Bibcode:2008MWRv..136.3121C. doi:10.1175/2007MWR2171.1.
- Edwards, Roger; LaDue, James G.; Ferree, John T.; Scharfenberg, Kevin; Maier, Chris; Coulbourne, William L. (May 1, 2013). "Tornado Intensity Estimation: Past, Present, and Future". Bulletin of the American Meteorological Society. 94 (5). American Meteorological Society: 641–653. Bibcode:2013BAMS...94..641E. doi:10.1175/BAMS-D-11-00006.1.
- Grazulis, Thomas P. (May 1984). Violent Tornado Climatography, 1880–1982. OSTI (Technical report). NUREG. Washington, D.C.: Nuclear Regulatory Commission. OSTI 7099491. CR-3670.
  - — (November 1990). Significant Tornadoes 1880–1989. Vol. 2. St. Johnsbury, Vermont: The Tornado Project of Environmental Films. ISBN 1-879362-02-3.
  - — (July 1993). Significant Tornadoes 1680–1991: A Chronology and Analysis of Events. St. Johnsbury, Vermont: The Tornado Project of Environmental Films. ISBN 1-879362-03-1.
  - — (2001a). The Tornado: Nature's Ultimate Windstorm. Norman: University of Oklahoma Press. ISBN 978-0-8061-3538-0.
  - — (2001b). F5-F6 Tornadoes. St. Johnsbury, Vermont: The Tornado Project of Environmental Films.
