= 1973 Central Alabama tornado =

1973 F4 tornado in Alabama, U.S.

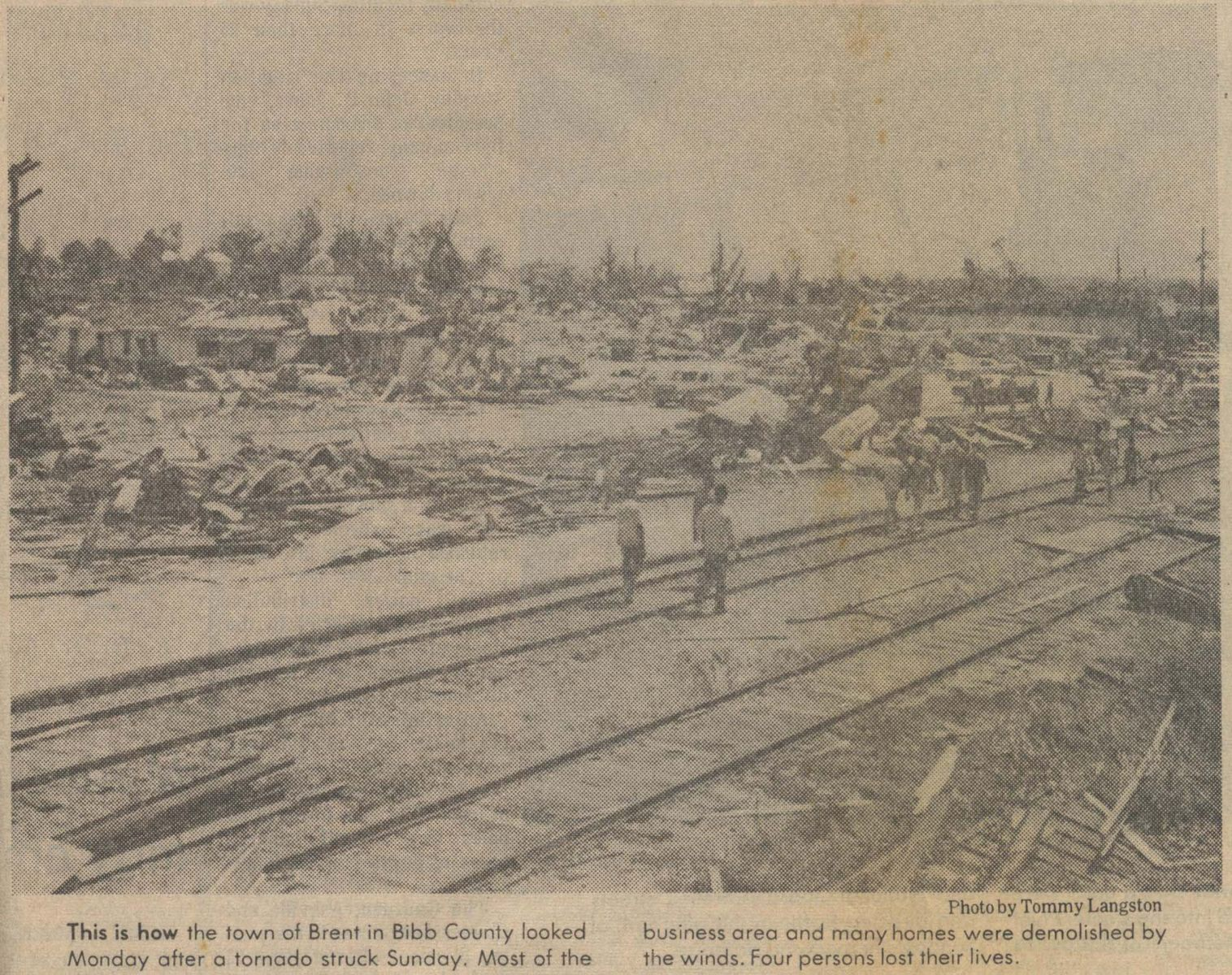
- Violent F4, borderline F5, tornado damage in Brent, Alabama

Meteorological history
- Formed: May 27, 1973, 5:20 p.m. CDT (UTC−04:00)
- Dissipated: May 27, 1973, 7:20 p.m. CDT (UTC−04:00)
- Duration: 2 hours

F4 tornado
- on the Fujita scale
- Highest winds: 210 to 261 mph (338 to 420 km/h)

Overall effects
- Fatalities: 7
- Injuries: 199-208
- Part of the tornado outbreaks of 1973

During the afternoon and evening of May 27, 1973, a violent and long-tracked tornado tracked across Central Alabama, where it produced catastrophic damage in the cities of Greensboro, Brent, Centreville, Montevallo, Columbiana, Wilsonville, and Childersburg. The tornado was on the ground for an exceptionally long time, crossing six counties along a track of 139.1 miles (223.9 km). During this long track, seven people were killed and 199 others were injured. The National Weather Service (NWS) rated the tornado F4 on the Fujita scale, with winds estimated to be between 210 and 261 mph (338 and 420 km/h). In the official publication for storm events in the United States, done in the months following a weather event, the National Oceanic and Atmospheric Administration and the National Climatic Data Center did not report any information for this tornado. The tornado also struck the NWS office in Centreville, becoming one of the few tornadoes to ever strike an NWS office building.

== Tornado summary ==
The tornado touched down 3 miles (4.8 km) north-northeast of Demopolis and moved towards Greensboro. In Greensboro, 72 people were injured, and major damage occurred to several structures. The tornado struck the Old South Academy, where a large brick building was torn apart, as well as the Greensboro bank, where cancelled checks from the bank were thrown all the way to Gadsden, over 100 miles (160 km) away.

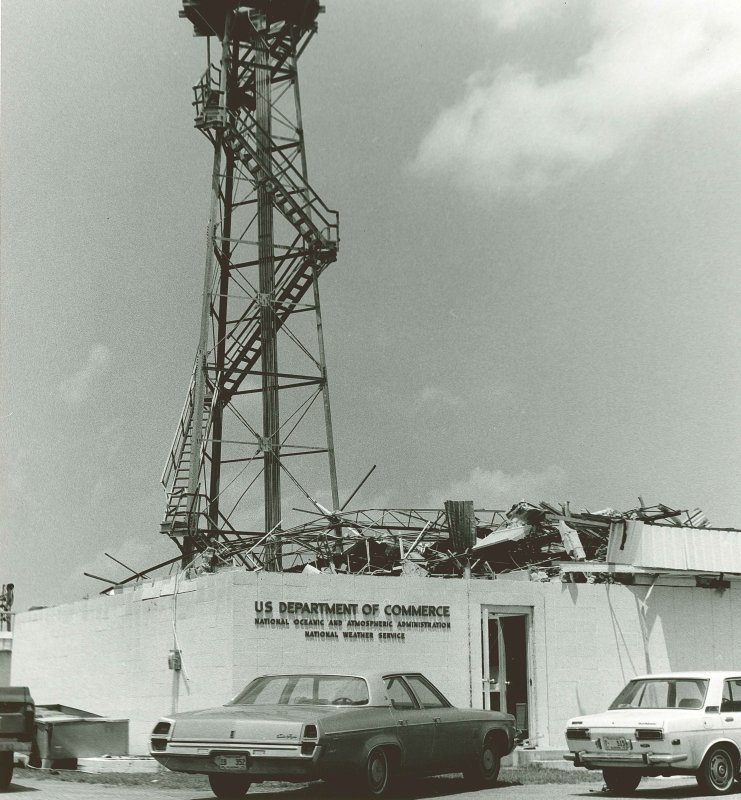
Damage to the National Weather Service office in Centreville.

After Greensboro, the tornado continued northeast, where it struck the city of Brent. Tornado expert Thomas P. Grazulis documented that 90 percent of Brent was destroyed, with parts described by John Brasher as being "beyond recognition". In Brent, five people were killed and 56 others were injured. Between Brent and the adjacent city of Centreville, 67 homes and 27 trailer homes were destroyed, and 37 businesses were damaged or destroyed. As the tornado formed near Demopolis, Dale Black, a radar operator at the NWS office in Centreville, stated that if the storm "holds together it will pass right over us". As the tornado struck the NWS building, Bob Cole, a forecaster at the office, was sending information to the NWS forecast office in Birmingham on West Oxmoor Rd. about another storm. Radar operator Black used a phone "which somehow remained operational for a short time" and called the office in Birmingham, where he said, "We’ve been hit". The radar at the office was completely destroyed by the tornado, with the NWS noting the radar dome "vanished". John Brasher, a reporter for the Centreville Press, called the two meteorologists at the Centreville office "heroes", as they stayed on the job, knowing they were in the path of the tornado.

Along the tornado's entire track, 216 buildings were destroyed, 570 others were damaged, 45 businesses were damaged or destroyed, and 97 trailer homes were destroyed. Grazulis documented that "more than 12,000 acres of timber were heavily damaged" by the tornado. In total, the 800-yard (730 m) wide tornado killed seven people and injured at least 199 people along the 139.1-mile (223.9 km) track. While the NWS officially recorded 199 injuries, Grazulis recorded 208. Grazulis also documented this tornado as being most likely a family of tornadoes, with only the first 65 miles (105 km) being a single tornado. John Brasher and Jim Oakley, another reporter with the Centreville Press, followed the tornado's track and said that “the tornado never lifted from the ground as it followed Highway 25 the entire way.”

=== Possible F5 intensity ===
John Brasher, a reporter and photographer for the Centreville Press, stated that as the tornado struck Main Street in Brent, “the tornado’s already violent F4 winds would ramp up to, and possibly beyond, the threshold of F5 strength”. The National Weather Service in Birmingham, Alabama, noted the rating for this tornado was F4 on the Fujita scale, which has a wind speed range of 207 to 260 miles per hour (333 to 418 km/h). However, the wind speeds assigned to this tornado was between 210 to 261 miles per hour (338 to 420 km/h), indicating the potential that this tornado had winds up to F5 intensity.

== See also ==
- List of F4, EF4, and IF4 tornadoes
  - 1973 Jonesboro tornado
