= List of United States tornadoes from January to February 1973 =

This is a list of all tornadoes that were confirmed by local offices of the National Weather Service in the United States from January to February 1973.

== United States yearly total ==
Confirmed tornadoes by Fujita rating
FU	F0	F1	F2	F3	F4	F5	Total
0	219	497	301	71	13	1	1102

== January ==
Confirmed tornadoes by Fujita rating
FU	F0	F1	F2	F3	F4	F5	Total
0	5	14	13	1	0	0	33

=== January 18 event ===
List of confirmed tornadoes - Thursday, January 18, 1973
F#	Location	County	Coord.	Time (UTC)	Path length	Damage
Oklahoma
F2	WSW of Keokuk Falls	Seminole	35.4°N 96.67°W	0220	5.1 miles (8.2 km)	A tornado damaged several homes, injuring 4 people.
Arkansas
F0	SW of Dardanelle	Boone	35.2°N 93.18°W	0850	0.1 miles (0.2 km)	
Missouri
F2	N of Doniphan	Ripley	36.68°N 90.83°W	1355	4.3 miles (6.9 km)	A tornado damaged a home, injuring 1 person.
F1	SSW of Guam	Stoddard	36.88°N 89.83°W	1610	4.7 miles (7.6 km)	
Illinois
F1	SE of Commerce, MO to SSE of Rising Sun, IL	Alexander, Pulaski, Union, Johnson, Pope, Saline, Gallatin	37.13°N 89.42°W	1415	95.9 miles (154.3 km)	
Louisiana
F3	NNW of Columbia to NE of Archibald	Caldwell, Richland	32.4°N 91.73°W	1355	38 miles (61.2 km)	1 death - A long-tracked tornado destroyed several homes while tracking through the communities of Logtown and Alto. The tornado also injured an additional two people.
F2	NE of Tallulah	Madison	32.42°N 91.17°W	1700	0.2 miles (0.3 km)	
Florida
F0	ESE of Molino	Escambia	30.72°N 87.3°W	2000	0.3 miles (0.5 km)	
Mississippi
F2	Stallo area	Neshoba, Winston	32.92°N 89.1°W	2000	7.6 miles (12.2 km)	
F2	ENE of Redwater	Leake	32.8°N 89.47°W	2030	2.7 miles (4.3 km)	

=== January 20 event ===
List of confirmed tornadoes - Saturday, January 20, 1973
F#	Location	County	Coord.	Time (UTC)	Path length	Damage
Texas
F1	SSE of Timpson to NNE of Woods	Shelby, Panola	31.88°N 94.38°W	1410	14.5 miles (23.3 km)	
F1	SSE of Timpson to W of Antioch	Shelby, Panola	31.88°N 94.38°W	1415	17.3 miles (27.8 km)	
F1	NNW of Lindale	Smith	32.57°N 95.43°W	1430	0.3 miles (0.5 km)	
F1	NE of Bullard	Smith	32.15°N 95.28°W	1515	0.5 miles (0.8 km)	
F1	SE of Melvin	McCulloch	31.12°N 99.43°W	1800	0.5 miles (0.8 km)	
F1	SE of Harkeyville	San Saba	31.2°N 98.78°W	1815	4.3 miles (6.9 km)	
F1	Fredericksburg area	Gillespie	30.25°N 98.83°W	1900	0.1 miles (0.2 km)	A tornado snapped several trees by a pond.
F1	Seguin area	Guadalupe	29.6°N 97.97°W	1930	0.1 miles (0.2 km)	Brief tornado damaged a couple homes.
F1	SE of Leesville	Camp	32.95°N 95.05°W	1930	0.3 miles (0.5 km)	
F1	Alcoa area	Milam	30.57°N 97.07°W	2100	0.3 miles (0.5 km)	
F2	NNE of Bee Cave	Travis	30.35°N 97.92°W	2100	0.1 miles (0.2 km)	
Louisiana
F2	SSE of Harmon	Red River	32.00°N 93.45°W	1745	7.7 miles (12.4 km)	

=== January 21 event ===
List of confirmed tornadoes - Sunday, January 21, 1973
F#	Location	County	Coord.	Time (UTC)	Path length	Damage
Texas
F2	SW of James	Shelby	31.83°N 94.13°W	0015	8.7 miles (14.0 km)	A long-tracked tornado touched down SW of James, snapping many trees. The tornado traveled into the community of Antioch, and damaged several homes, injuring three people. The tornado then lifted near Campti.
F0	SE of Rose City	Orange	30.07°N 94.00°W	0130	3 miles (4.8 km)	
Florida
F0	Pensacola area	Escambia	30.47°N 87.2°W	1145	0.3 miles (0.5 km)	A tornado downed several power lines, trees, and damaged several homes.

=== January 22 event ===
List of confirmed tornadoes - Monday, January 22, 1973
F#	Location	County	Coord.	Time (UTC)	Path length	Damage
Florida
F1	Lakeland	Polk	28.02°N 81.97°W	0845	1.5 miles (2.4 km)	A tornado damaged many homes and businesses, including a church whose steeple was blown off.
F1	SSE of Durant	Hillsborough	27.87°N 82.17°W	0856	0.3 miles (0.5 km)	

=== January 26 event ===
List of confirmed tornadoes - Friday, January 26, 1973
F#	Location	County	Coord.	Time (UTC)	Path length	Damage
Alabama
F2	WSW of Geraldine	Marshall	34.33°N 86.07°W	1545	0.1 miles (0.2 km)	

=== January 28 event ===
List of confirmed tornadoes - Sunday, January 28, 1973
F#	Location	County	Coord.	Time (UTC)	Path length	Damage
Florida
F1	SE of Dade City	Pasco	28.33°N 82.17°W	1035	2 miles (3.2 km)	Several buildings sustained minor damage, along with downed trees and power lines.
F2	Kissimmee area	Osceola	28.27°N 81.47°W	1115	14 miles (22.5 km)	A tornado tracked through Kissimmee, damaging many buildings. The tornado downed many trees and blew a car off the road. The tornado injured at least 7 people.
F2	Orlando area	Orange	28.52°N 81.43°W	1142	2.7 miles (4.3 km)	A tornado destroyed many buildings, injuring 16 people.
F2	N of Port St. John	Brevard	28.5°N 80.8°W	1230	5.1 miles (8.2 km)	A tornado damaged buildings and then crossed the Indian River.

=== January 31 event ===
List of confirmed tornadoes - Wednesday, January 31, 1973
F#	Location	County	Coord.	Time (UTC)	Path length	Damage
Texas
F0	SE of Kaufman	Kaufman	32.53°N 96.2°W	1650	6.2 miles (10.0 km)	

== February ==
Confirmed tornadoes by Fujita rating
FU	F0	F1	F2	F3	F4	F5	Total
0	1	5	4	0	0	0	10

=== February 2 event ===
List of confirmed tornadoes - Friday, February 2, 1973
F#	Location	County	Coord.	Time (UTC)	Path length	Damage
Georgia
F1	SSE of Norwood	Warren	33.45°N 82.7°W	0230	1 mile (1.6 km)	
F1	NE of Thomson	McDuffie	33.5°N 82.47°W	0230	1 mile (1.6 km)	A tornado downed trees and destroyed a small shed.
New Jersey
F2	SE of Clinton	Hunterdon	40.6°N 74.87°W	2030	2.7 miles (4.3 km)	
F1	Dreahook area	Hunterdon	40.58°N 74.8°W	2030	0.2 miles (0.3 km)	
F1	N of Union Township	Hunterdon	40.67°N 74.97°W	2030	0.3 miles (0.5 km)	

=== February 8 event ===
List of confirmed tornadoes - Thursday, February 8, 1973
F#	Location	County	Coord.	Time (UTC)	Path length	Damage
Georgia
F0	NW of Albany	Lee	31.65°N 84.25°W	1640	0.1 miles (0.2 km)	Brief tornado downed trees and destroyed a fence.
F2	NW of Sylvester	Worth	31.58°N 83.93°W	1730	2 miles (3.2 km)	A strong tornado destroyed a mobile home and damaged many other buildings, injuring at least 5 people.

=== February 9 event ===
List of confirmed tornadoes - Thursday, February 8, 1973
F#	Location	County	Coord.	Time (UTC)	Path length	Damage
Florida
F2	Port Salerno area	Martin	27.13°N 80.2°W	2228	2 miles (3.2 km)	A very strong tornado impacted the southern portion of Port Salerno, causing major roof damage to several buildings and downing trees and power lines. The tornado also damaged a marina and moved into the Atlantic Ocean. The tornado injured at least one person.

=== February 13 event ===
List of confirmed tornadoes - Thursday, February 8, 1973
F#	Location	County	Coord.	Time (UTC)	Path length	Damage
Texas
F2	Cypress area	Harris	29.97°N 95.72°W	1300	3.3 miles (5.3 km)	A tornado damaged many buildings, injuring 1 person.
Mississippi
F1	Gulf Hills area	Jackson	30.43°N 88.83°W	2359	1.3 miles (2.1 km)	A weak tornado touched down in Gulf Hills in the middle of the night, injuring 1 person.

== See also ==
- Tornadoes of 1973
