= Tornadoes of 1980 =

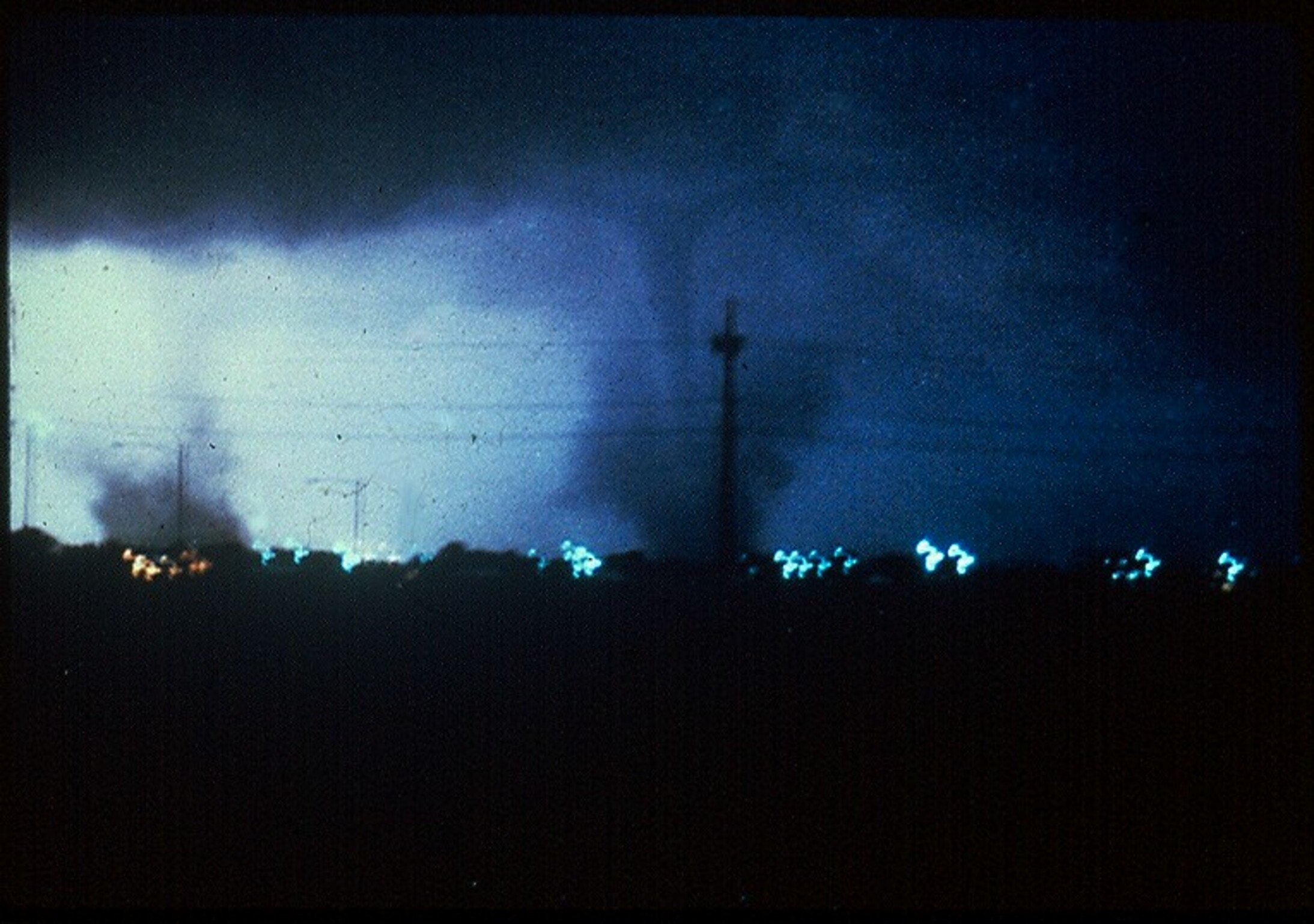
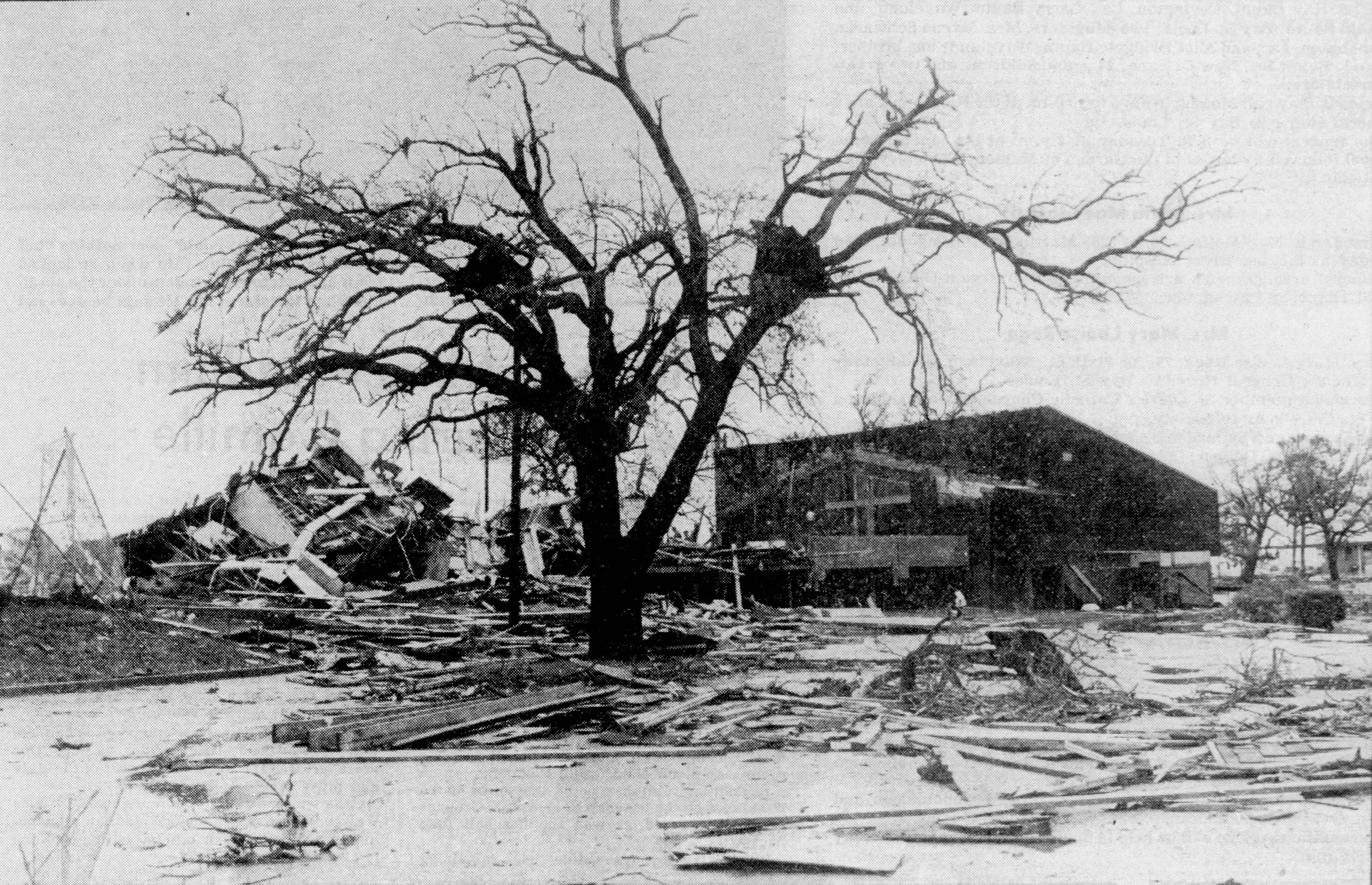
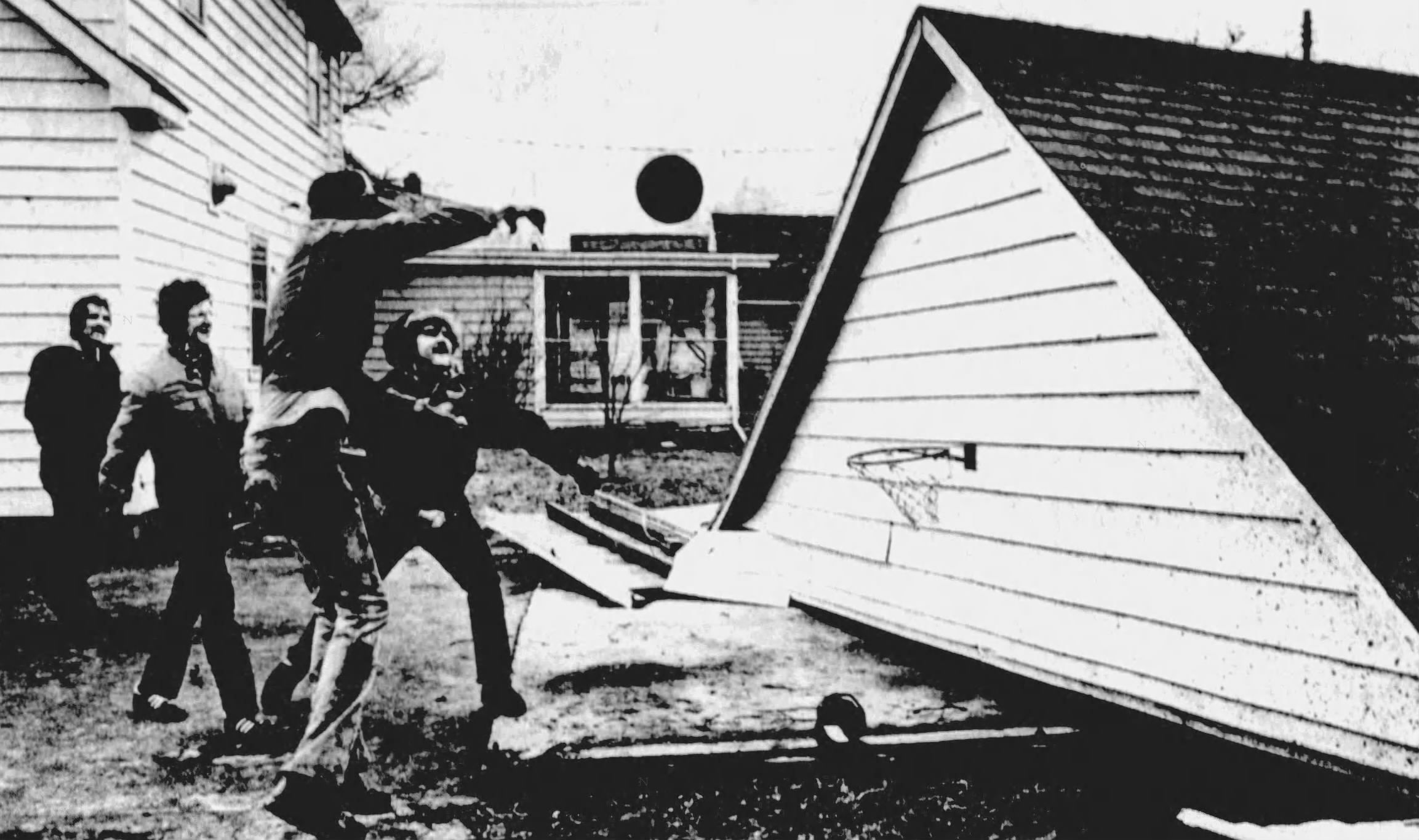
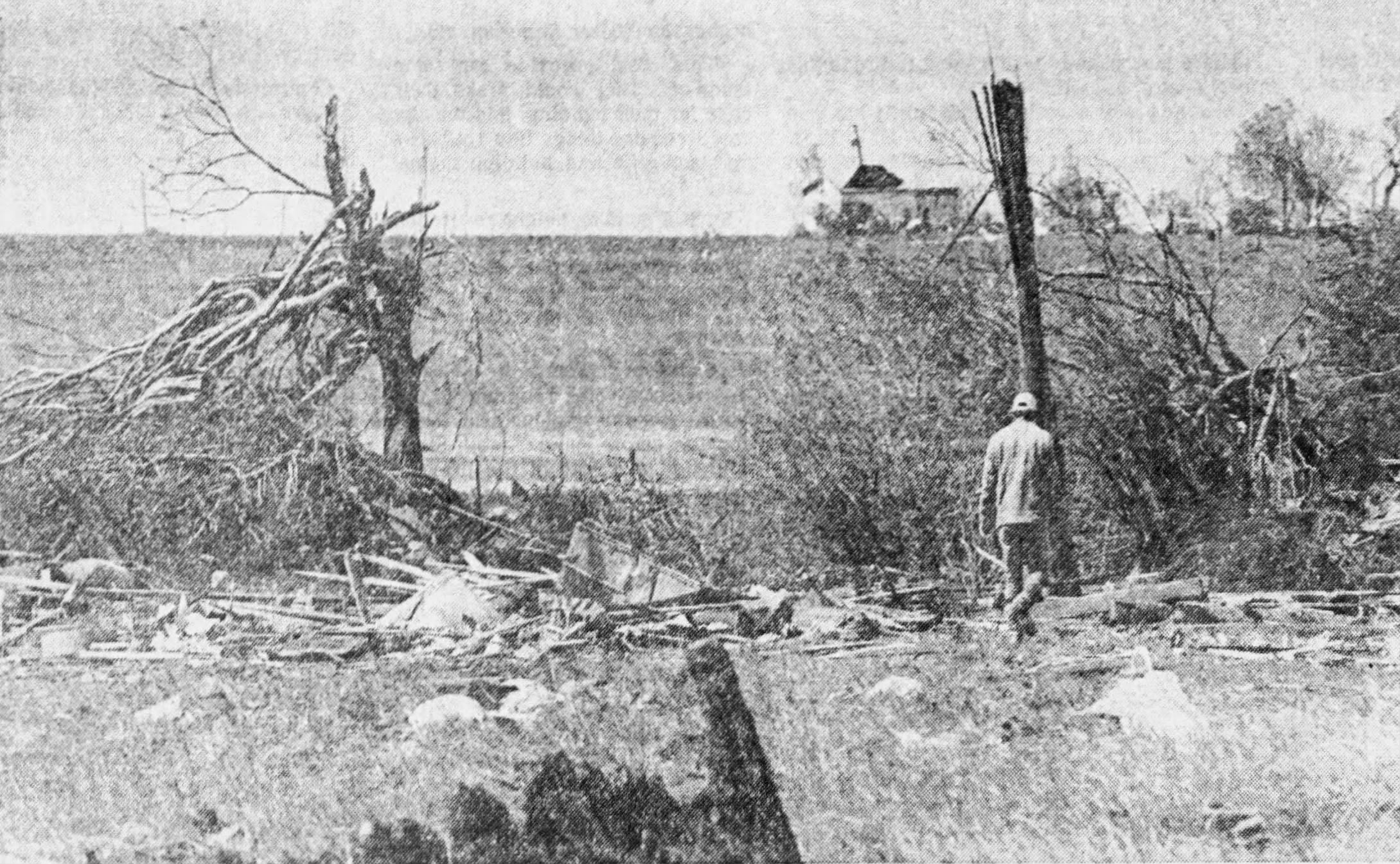
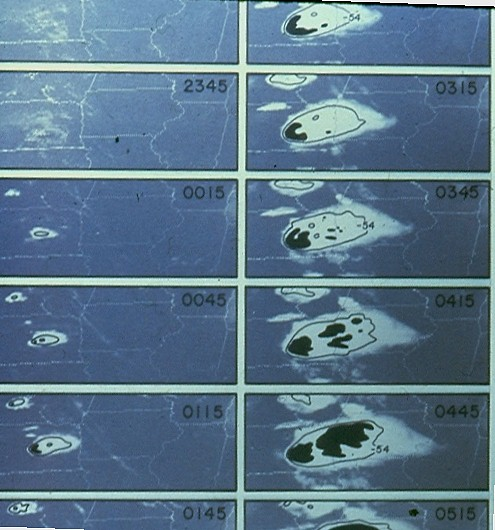
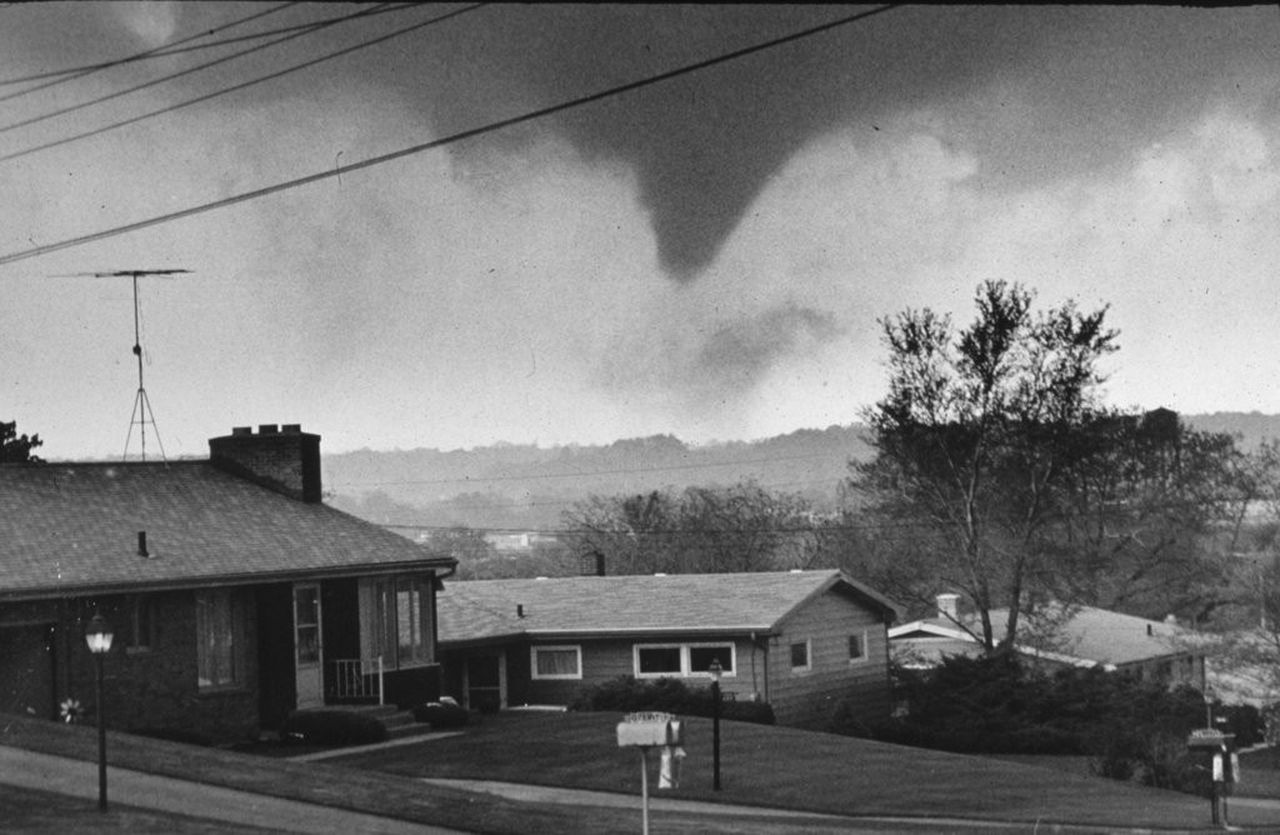
- Clockwise from top: Two nocturnal tornadoes on the ground simultaneously in Grand Island, Nebraska on June 3: one condensed and one uncondensed; Cleanup workers playing basketball with a hoop that was still intact after an F2 tornado struck Beaver Dam, Wisconsin on April 7; A series of satellite photos showing a tornadic supercell that produced 7 tornadoes in Grand Island, Nebraska on June 3; An F3 tornado that struck downtown Kalamazoo, Michigan on May 13, 1980; Damage to a home northeast of Austin, Texas after an F3 tornado on April 7; The Westside Community Center in Gulfport, Mississippi after an F3 tornado on April 13.
- Timespan: January 11 – December 7, 1980
- Maximum rated tornado: F4 tornado: Baylor County, Texas on April 2; Lamoni, Iowa-Powersville, Missouri on June 2; Natrona Heights, Pennsylvania on June 3; Grand Island, Nebraska on June 3; Rushville, Indiana on July 9
- Tornadoes in U.S.: 866
- Damage (U.S.): >$350 million
- Fatalities (U.S.): 28
- Fatalities (worldwide): >28

This page documents the tornadoes and tornado outbreaks of 1980, primarily in the United States. Most tornadoes form in the U.S., although some events may take place internationally. Tornado statistics for older years like this often appear significantly lower than modern years due to fewer reports or confirmed tornadoes.

== Events ==
Fatal United States tornadoes in 1980
- Approximate touchdown location of killer tornadoes in 1980
Summary of tornadoes
- March 1 – Florida (1 death)
- March 20 – Mississippi (1 death)
- April 7 – Texas (1 death)
- April 8 – Kentucky (2 deaths)
- April 25 – Mississippi (1 death)
- May 13 – Michigan (5 deaths)
- May 15 – Louisiana (1 death)
- May 16 – Louisiana (1 death)
- May 30 – Indiana (1 death)
- June 2 – Indiana (1 death)
- June 3 – Nebraska (1 death)
- June 3 – Nebraska (1 death)
- June 3 – Nebraska (3 deaths)
- June 7 – Indiana (1 death)
- July 9 – Indiana (2 deaths)
- July 15 – Wisconsin (1 death)
- July 15 – Wisconsin (1 death)
- July 15 – Wisconsin (1 death)
- September 3 – Minnesota (1 death)
- October 17 – Arkansas (1 death)
Total fatalities: 28

Numbers for 1980 were below average, both in terms of number of tornadoes and number of fatalities; however, there were over 1,100 injuries related to tornadoes.

=== United States yearly total ===
Confirmed tornadoes by Fujita rating
FU	F0	F1	F2	F3	F4	F5	Total
0	269	398	162	32	5	0	866

== January ==
There were 7 tornadoes in the US in January.

== February ==
There were 11 tornadoes in the US in February.

== March ==
There were 41 tornadoes in the US in March.

=== March 1 ===
FU	F0	F1	F2	F3	F4	F5
0	0	1	0	1	0	0

An F3 tornado struck Pompano Beach, Florida, killing one and injuring 33. This was last of only three F3/EF3 tornadoes to hit Broward County, Florida, with the others occurring on April 10, 1956, and February 23, 1965.

== April ==
There were 137 tornadoes in the US in April.

=== April 2–4 ===
FU	F0	F1	F2	F3	F4	F5
0	4	10	2	0	1	0

An outbreak of 17 tornadoes struck the Great Plains, Midwest, and Eastern United States starting with an F4 tornado that struck Baylor County, Texas. Overall, the outbreak injured four.

=== April 5 ===
A rare strong F2 tornado injured one in California.

== May ==
There were 203 tornadoes in the US in May.

=== May 13 ===
FU	F0	F1	F2	F3	F4	F5
0	0	2	0	2	0	0

A destructive F3 tornado tore through Downtown Kalamazoo, Michigan, killing five, injuring 79, and causing an estimated at $50 million in damage. The tornado was one of four damaging tornadoes on this day. There were five fatalities and 94 injuries.

== June ==
There were 217 tornadoes in the US in June.

=== June 2–3 ===
FU	F0	F1	F2	F3	F4	F5
0	2	11	9	4	3	0

A two-day tornado outbreak caused widespread damage from North Dakota and Nebraska to Pennsylvania. The outbreak is best remembered for a slow-moving supercell complex that moved across Grand Island, Nebraska, spawning seven tornadoes, three of which were anticyclonic. The tornadoes also did not move in a straight line, with most looping back over their own path at least once. This part of the outbreak, which is also known as The Night of the Twisters, killed five and injured 200. Overall, the outbreak produced 29 tornadoes, killed six people and injured 413.

=== June 29 ===
FU	F0	F1	F2	F3	F4	F5
0	0	1	2	0	0	0

An F2 tornado in Harford County, Maryland, moved onto the Aberdeen Proving Ground, injuring 10.

== July ==
There were 95 tornadoes in the US in July.

=== July 8–12 ===
FU	F0	F1	F2	F3	F4	F5
0	4	11	5	1	1	0

A deadly outbreak sequence of 22 tornadoes tore through the Northern United States with July 9 producing an F4 tornado that killed two and injured 25 in Rushville, Indiana. Overall, two people were killed and 37 others were injured.

=== July 15–16 ===
FU	F0	F1	F2	F3	F4	F5
0	4	6	5	1	0	0

An intense weather system spawned a derecho that trigged the start of a two-day tornado outbreak from South Dakota to Pennsylvania, although it started with an F1 tornado in Florida. Three people were killed in separate tornadoes in Wisconsin on July 15, with tornadoes also injuring 27 others.

== August ==
There were 73 tornadoes in the US in August.

== September ==
There were 37 tornadoes in the US in September.

=== September 3 ===
FU	F0	F1	F2	F3	F4	F5
0	5	0	3	1	0	0

A small, but destructive outbreak of nine tornadoes hit the Mississippi Valley with a deadly F3 tornado striking Downtown St. Cloud, Minnesota, killing one and injuring 15.

== October ==
There were 43 tornadoes in the US in October.

== November ==
There were 3 tornadoes in the US in November.

== December ==
There were 2 tornadoes in the US in December.

== See also ==
- Tornado
  - Tornadoes by year
  - Tornado records
  - Tornado climatology
  - Tornado myths
- List of tornado outbreaks
  - List of F5 and EF5 tornadoes
  - List of North American tornadoes and tornado outbreaks
  - List of 21st-century Canadian tornadoes and tornado outbreaks
  - List of European tornadoes and tornado outbreaks
  - List of tornadoes and tornado outbreaks in Asia
  - List of Southern Hemisphere tornadoes and tornado outbreaks
  - List of tornadoes striking downtown areas
- Tornado intensity
  - Fujita scale
  - Enhanced Fujita scale
