= Broward County tornadoes of March 1, 1980 =

Weather event in Florida, United States

Tornado outbreak
- Tornadoes: 2
- Max. rating: F3 tornado
- Duration: March 1, 1980
- Highest winds: 52 kn (60 mph; 96 km/h)

Overall effects
- Fatalities: ≥ 1
- Injuries: 33
- Damage: $7,750,000 ($30,280,000 in 2025 USD) (Note: All losses are in 1980 United States dollars unless otherwise noted.)
- Areas affected: Broward County, Florida
- Part of the tornadoes and tornado outbreaks of 1980

On Saturday, March 1, 1980, a pair of destructive tornadoes struck South Florida, extensively damaging to apartment complexes, businesses, school buildings, and homes. The first of the tornado touched down in Oakland Park and tracked northeast for almost 12 mi (19 km), moving offshore at Pompano Beach. It produced F3 damage, killed one person, and injured 33 others. A second, smaller, and weaker tornado produced F1 damage just 5 mi (8.0 km) to the north, in Deerfield Beach. Losses from both tornadoes totaled almost $8 million.

== Confirmed tornadoes ==
Confirmed tornadoes by Fujita rating
FU	F0	F1	F2	F3	F4	F5	Total
0	0	1	0	1	0	0	2

Prior to 1990, there is a likely undercount of tornadoes, particularly E/F0–1, with reports of weaker tornadoes becoming more common as population increased. A sharp increase in the annual average E/F0–1 count by approximately 200 tornadoes was noted upon the implementation of NEXRAD Doppler weather radar in 1990–1991. (Note: Historically, the number of tornadoes globally and in the United States was and is likely underrepresented: research by Grazulis on annual tornado activity suggests that, as of 2001, only 53% of yearly U.S. tornadoes were officially recorded. Documentation of tornadoes outside the United States was historically less exhaustive, owing to the lack of monitors in many nations and, in some cases, to internal political controls on public information. Most countries only recorded tornadoes that produced severe damage or loss of life. Significant low biases in U.S. tornado counts likely occurred through the early 1990s, when advanced NEXRAD was first installed and the National Weather Service began comprehensively verifying tornado occurrences.) 1974 marked the first year where significant tornado (E/F2+) counts became homogenous with contemporary values, attributed to the consistent implementation of Fujita scale assessments. (Note: The Fujita scale was devised under the aegis of scientist T. Theodore Fujita in the early 1970s. Prior to the advent of the scale in 1971, tornadoes in the United States were officially unrated. Tornado ratings were retroactively applied to events prior to the formal adoption of the F-scale by the National Weather Service. While the Fujita scale has been superseded by the Enhanced Fujita scale in the U.S. since February 1, 2007, Canada used the old scale until April 1, 2013; nations elsewhere, like the United Kingdom, apply other classifications such as the TORRO scale.) Numerous discrepancies on the details of tornadoes in this outbreak exist between sources. The total count of tornadoes and ratings differs from various agencies accordingly. The list below documents information from the most contemporary official sources alongside assessments from tornado historian Thomas P. Grazulis.

Color/symbol key
Color / symbol	Description
†	Data from Grazulis 1990/1993/2001b
¶	Data from a local National Weather Service office
※	Data from the 1980 Storm Data publication
‡	Data from the NCEI database
♭	Data from newspaper(s)
♯	Maximum width of tornado
±	Tornado was rated below F2 intensity by Grazulis but a specific rating is unavailable.

=== March 1 event ===
Confirmed tornadoes – Saturday, March 1, 1980 (Note: All dates are based on the local time zone where the tornado touched down; however, all times are in Coordinated Universal Time and dates are split at midnight CST/CDT for consistency.)
F#	Location	County / Parish	State	Start Coord. (Note: All starting coordinates are based on the NCEI database and may not reflect contemporary analyses.)	Time (UTC)	Path length	Width (Note: The listed width values are primarily the average/mean width of the tornadoes, with those having known maximum widths denoted by ♯. From 1952 to 1994, reports largely list mean width whereas contemporary years list maximum width. Values provided by Grazulis are the average width, with estimates being rounded down (i.e. 0.5 mi (0.80 km) is rounded down from 880 yards to 800 yards.)	Damage
F3	Southwestern Oakland Park to Pompano Beach	Broward	FL	26.17°N 80.17°W	01:50–?†	12 mi (19 km)♭	500 yd (460 m)	$7,000,000♭
F3	1+ death – See section on this tornado – 33 injuries occurred.							
F1	Deerfield Beach※	Broward	FL	26.33°N 80.08°W	02:30–02:45♭	0.5 mi (0.80 km)‡	33 yd (30 m)‡	$750,000※
F1	A brief tornado smashed glass, jalousie windows, and roofing, including a 10-by-10-foot (3.0 by 3.0 m) patio roof-and-screen section; it also tore off tarpaper and awnings. Fallen roof tiles damaged a new automobile as well.							

=== Oakland Park–Pompano Beach, Florida ===
Oakland Park–Pompano Beach, Florida
Meteorological history
- Formed: March 1, 1980, 8:50 p.m. EST (UTC−05:00)
- Dissipated: March 1, 1980, 9:15 p.m. EST (UTC−05:00)
- Duration: 25 minutes

F3 tornado
- on the Fujita scale
- Highest winds: 158–206 mph (254–332 km/h)

Overall effects
- Fatalities: 1+
- Injuries: 33
- Damage: $7,000,000 ($27,350,000 in 2025 USD)

Possibly a tornado family, an intense tornado touched down in southwestern Oakland Park, striking the Royal Park condominium. There it damaged 20 or more automobiles and flipped five, one of which it piled atop another. It also extensively damaged 20 condo units; flying glass flayed several residents, resulting in severe injuries. Hitting Easterlin Park, it downed trees, lofted tents, and upended campers, injuring four people. Officials said the park was "leveled" and that tree damage would "take years" to repair, the Fort Lauderdale News stated. The tornado then overturned an 18-wheeler on 44th Street, near Commercial Boulevard. Crossing I-95, it was described as a "triangular black funnel with blue lights around it". It then impacted an elementary school, wrecking a portable classroom. Near Andrews Avenue and Prospect Road it flipped a few other large trucks, while tipping a nearby car onto its side, stranding people inside. At Oakland Pines Apartments it broke windows, felled trees, and unroofed buildings, turning the complex into a "battlefield", according to a denizen. A transformer was blown away and deemed missing. One person commented that she "saw the traffic lights flying off the wires and power lines flying in every direction".

We're taking away as many people as we can. They're not just going to one hospital, but to all of them

— Fort Lauderdale News

In Pompano Beach the tornado blew out windows in an art gallery, badly damaged a furniture store, unroofed a warehouse, hit the Sun Sentinel offices, and injured 10 restauranteurs. It knocked down fencing and gates at a cemetery; tore out walls at the Island Club; and entangled an 8-foot (2.4 m) fishing boat in power lines, 15 ft (4.6 m) above ground. It then hit oceanside condos, doing most of its damage. An elderly woman fell six stories to her death, and a few other deaths were rumored. The tornado then moved over the Atlantic Ocean, having injured 33 people, most of them slightly. It or related events may have hit northern Fort Lauderdale, just south of Fort Lauderdale Executive Airport; Coconut Creek; or near Fort Lauderdale–Hollywood International Airport. Multiple funnel clouds were sighted in Coconut Creek and elsewhere along the path. The tornado was the most damaging to hit South Florida since 1953, unroofing numerous apartments and other buildings; it also damaged many businesses. About 300 to 400 buildings were affected, but homes were not completely destroyed. After the storm 200 public workers in Pompano Beach were mustered for cleanup, as were 80 in Oakland Park. As of 2024, the tornado is one of just three official E/F3s on record in South Florida. (Note: Tornadoes in the United States were unrated before 1971. Ratings were retroactively applied to events prior to the formal adoption of the F-scale by the National Weather Service. While official ratings extended back to 1950, tornado expert Thomas P. Grazulis rated older events.)

== Other effects ==
Winds toppled trees in Wilton Manors, and peaked at 52 kn (60 mph; 96 km/h) in Monroe County.

== See also ==
- List of North American tornadoes and tornado outbreaks
- Tornado outbreak of February 23, 1965 – Also spawned an F3 tornado near Fort Lauderdale
