= Hurricane Allen =

Category 5 Atlantic hurricane in 1980

- Allen at its record peak intensity east of the Yucatán Peninsula on August 7

Meteorological history
- Formed: August 1, 1980
- Dissipated: August 11, 1980

Category 5 major hurricane
- 1-minute sustained (SSHWS/NWS)
- Highest winds: 190 mph (305 km/h) (Tied for highest in Atlantic basin)
- Lowest pressure: 899 mbar (hPa); 26.55 inHg

Overall effects
- Fatalities: 281
- Missing: 26
- Damage: $1.57 billion (1980 USD)
- Areas affected: Lesser Antilles, Greater Antilles, Yucatán Peninsula, Northern Mexico, Southern Texas
- IBTrACS
- Part of the 1980 Atlantic hurricane season

Hurricane Allen was the most powerful Atlantic hurricane by wind speed on record, tied with Hurricane Melissa of 2025. The second tropical depression and first named storm of the 1980 Atlantic hurricane season, Allen was also the seventh most intense Atlantic hurricane on record in terms of barometric pressure. It was one of the few hurricanes to reach Category 5 status on the Saffir–Simpson scale on three occasions, and spent more time at Category 5 status than all but two other Atlantic hurricanes. Until Hurricane Melissa in 2025, Allen was the only hurricane in the recorded history of the Atlantic basin to achieve sustained winds of 190 mph (305 km/h), (Note: All wind speeds in the article are maximum sustained winds sustained for one minute, unless otherwise noted.) and until Hurricane Patricia in 2015, these were also the highest sustained winds in the Western Hemisphere. Hurricane Allen was also the third-most intense tropical cyclone to exist in the Gulf of Mexico in terms of minimum central pressure, behind hurricanes Milton in 2024 and Rita in 2005.

Throughout its track, Allen moved through the deep tropics on a westward to northwestward course across the tropical Atlantic Ocean, Caribbean Sea, and Gulf of Mexico before making its final landfall near the United States–Mexico border. At peak strength, the hurricane passed near Haiti, causing hundreds of deaths and heavy damage. After crossing the Gulf of Mexico, Allen weakened as it struck the lower Texas coast, causing high winds, a significant storm surge, and heavy rainfall, which resulted in considerable damage to South Texas. Overall, Allen killed at least 281 people and left $1.57 billion in damages (1980 US dollars), mostly in Haiti and the United States. Due to the hurricane's impact, the name Allen was retired from the six-year revolving list of Atlantic tropical cyclone names in 1981 and replaced by Andrew. The remnants of the storm caused a brief lapse in the heat wave of 1980 in places like Dallas/Fort Worth, Texas, which had recorded 69 days of 100 °F (38 °C) heat.

== Meteorological history ==
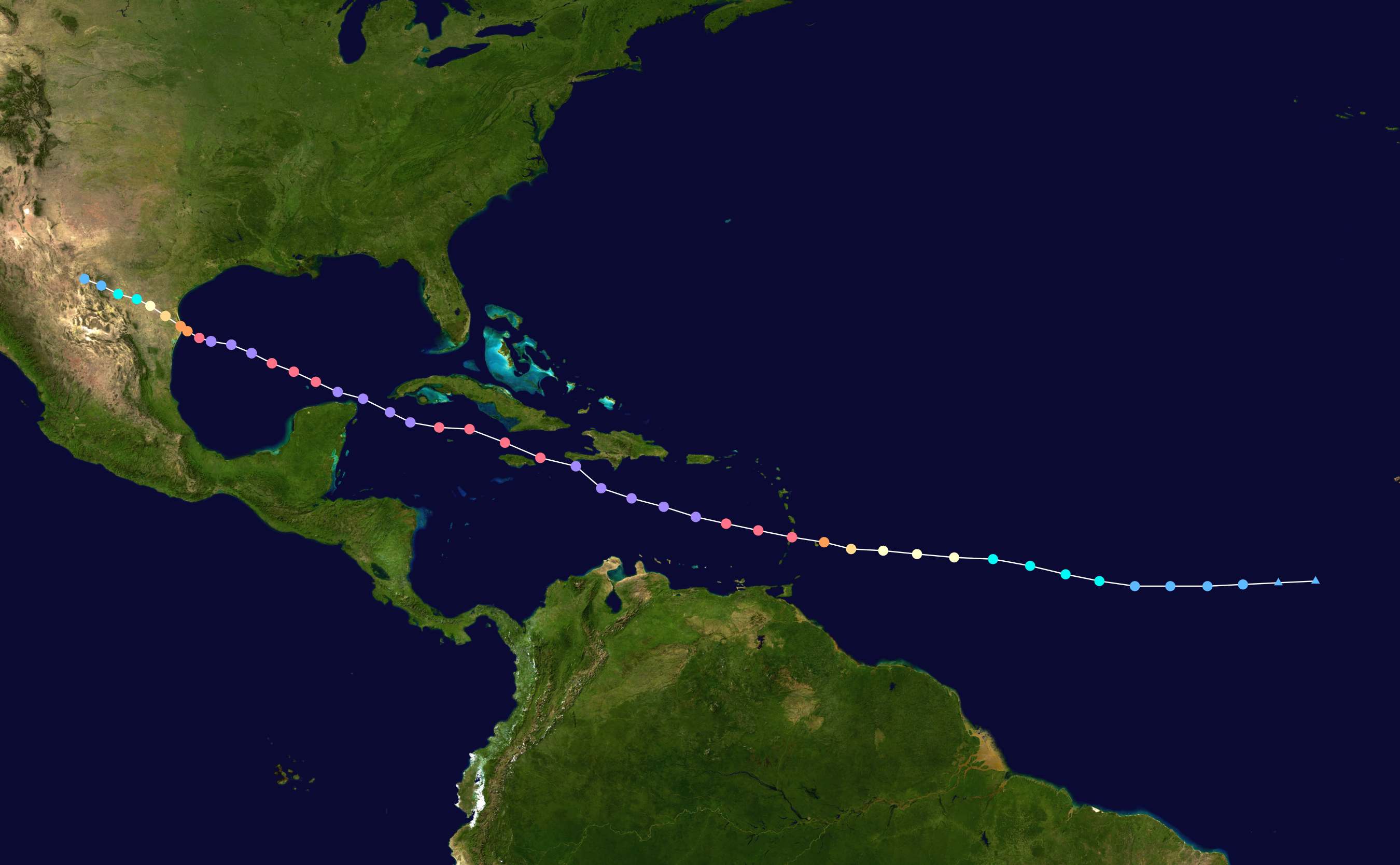
Map plotting the storm's track and intensity, according to the Saffir–Simpson scale Map key Saffir–Simpson scale Tropical depression (≤38 mph, ≤62 km/h) Tropical storm (39–73 mph, 63–118 km/h) Category 1 (74–95 mph, 119–153 km/h) Category 2 (96–110 mph, 154–177 km/h) Category 3 (111–129 mph, 178–208 km/h) Category 4 (130–156 mph, 209–251 km/h) Category 5 (≥157 mph, ≥252 km/h) Unknown Storm type Tropical cyclone Subtropical cyclone Extratropical cyclone, remnant low, tropical disturbance, or monsoon depression

Allen was an early-season Cape Verde-type hurricane, originating from a tropical wave that left the African coastline on July 30. The system developed quickly as it moved westward, becoming a tropical depression the following day. However, the National Hurricane Center did not initiate advisories on Allen until almost 24 hours later, when it was centered 1,300 mi (2,100 km) east of the Windward Islands. Early on August 2, as the depression moved quickly westward towards the Caribbean, it intensified into the first named storm of the 1980 Atlantic hurricane season. Allen rapidly strengthened as it continued westward. By the time an aircraft reconnaissance plane entered the tropical cyclone's center late on August 3, it had already achieved major hurricane status, with maximum sustained winds of 125 mph (200 km/h) and a minimum central pressure of 967 mbar (28.6 inHg), making Allen a Category 3 hurricane. The storm's central pressure dropped to 951 mbar (28.1 inHg) that night as its eye passed north of Barbados on August 4.

Allen continued to move quickly westward and entered the Caribbean Sea shortly after passing south of St. Lucia. Allen's rapid intensification continued during this time, as it was steered by a mid- to upper-level ridge to its north. Shortly before 0000 UTC on August 5, the hurricane's minimum pressure decreased to 924 mbar (924 hPa; 27.3 inHg), which was noted as equivalent to Hurricane David in the previous season. Another reconnaissance aircraft shortly thereafter discovered Allen had become an extremely strong Category 5 hurricane, with sustained winds of 180 mph (290 km/h) and a minimum pressure of 911 mbar (26.9 inHg) the following day. This was the lowest central pressure ever recorded in the eastern Caribbean Sea. Allen maintained its extreme intensity for most of the day. However, late on August 5, the storm began to weaken as it underwent an eyewall replacement cycle and interacted with the mountainous terrain of Hispaniola, with the storm taking a northwestward jog south of the island, a common track deviation for most hurricanes that have passed through the area.

Most intense Atlantic hurricanes
Rank	Hurricane	Season	Pressure	
Rank	Hurricane	Season	hPa	inHg
1	Wilma	2005	882	26.05
2	Gilbert	1988	888	26.23
3	"Labor Day"	1935	892	26.34
3	Melissa	2025	892	26.34
5	Rita	2005	895	26.43
5	Milton	2024	895	26.43
7	Allen	1980	899	26.55
8	Camille	1969	900	26.58
9	Katrina	2005	902	26.64
10	Mitch	1998	905	26.73
10	Dean	2007	905	26.73
Source: HURDAT

Allen resumed a more westward course as it left behind Hispaniola and passed north of Jamaica and the Cayman Islands on August 6. The very warm waters of the northwestern Caribbean Sea allowed the storm to begin another phase of rapid intensification. Allen reached its second and greatest peak intensity on the afternoon of August 7, with maximum sustained winds of 190 mph (305 km/h) and a minimum barometric pressure of 899 mbar (26.5 inHg). This makes Allen tied with Hurricane Melissa for the highest maximum sustained winds ever recorded in an Atlantic hurricane. Its minimum pressure of 899 millibars was the second-lowest pressure on record for the basin at the time. The major hurricane was also very large at this time, with hurricane-force winds extending 144 mi (232 km) from its center and tropical-storm-force winds extending 345 miles. Allen's circulation filled nearly the entire Gulf of Mexico, and was regarded at the time as the second-largest Atlantic hurricane on record, after 1961's Hurricane Carla. Continuing westward, the southern portion of Allen's circulation passed over the Yucatán Peninsula, causing the cyclone to weaken again. Allen bottomed out with winds of 130 mph (210 km/h) on August 8. Continued movement west over the warm waters of the Gulf of Mexico allowed Allen to restrengthen into a Category 5 hurricane for a third time as it moved over the open waters of the Gulf. The hurricane's central pressure dropped back to a tertiary low of 909 mbar (909 hPa; 26.8 inHg). Pressure falls over the southern United States at this time indicated Allen would soon slow its forward motion as it approached Texas. Allen's forward speed slowed considerably in the hours before it made landfall near Brownsville as a low-end Category 3 major hurricane on August 10. The storm rapidly weakened as it moved inland, eventually dissipating over the mountainous terrain of northern Mexico the following day.

== Preparations ==
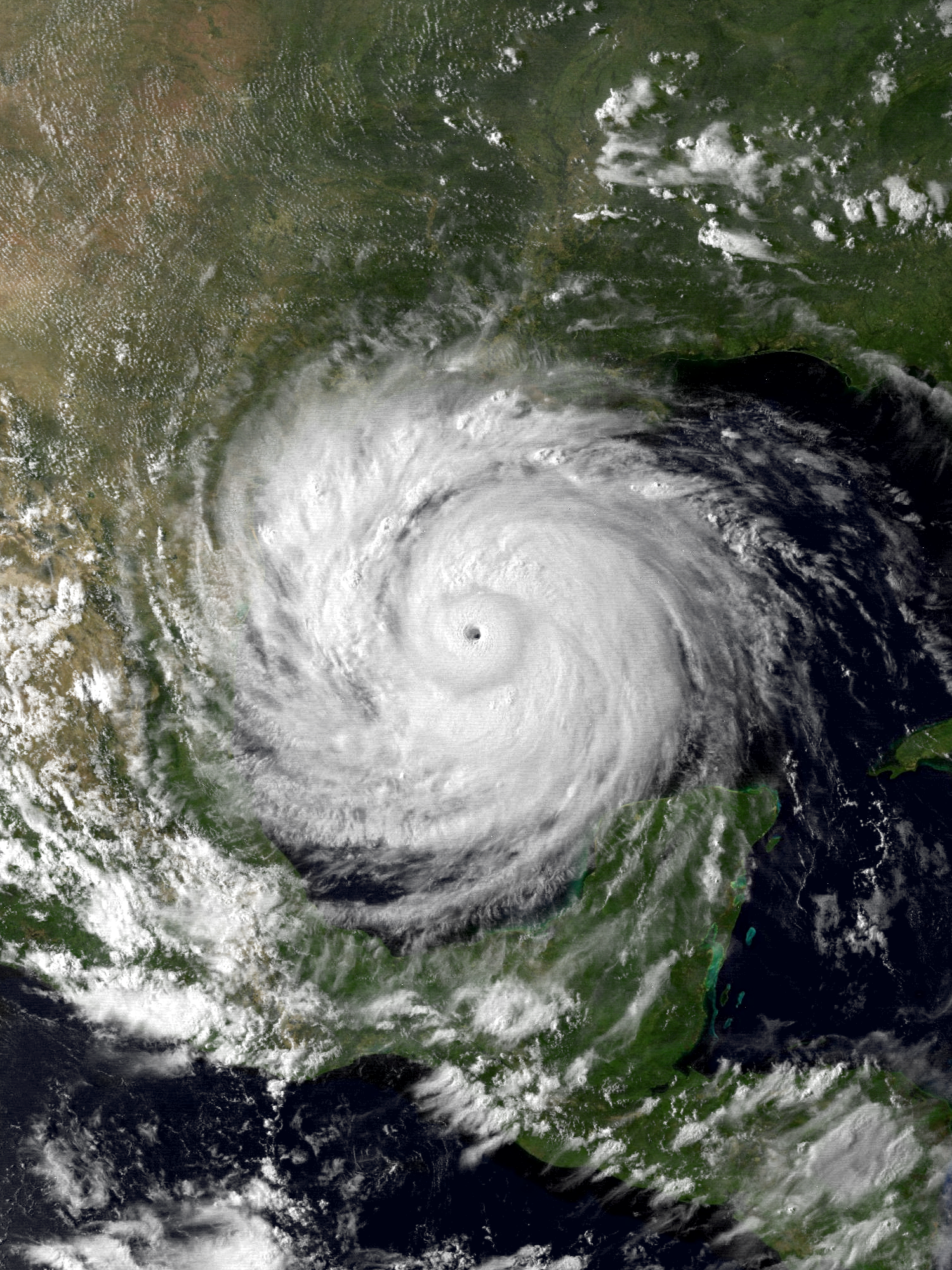
Hurricane Allen in the Gulf of Mexico on August 8.

As Allen approached the Caribbean Sea, gale warnings and a hurricane watch were issued for the islands of Barbados, St. Lucia, St. Vincent, Dominica, Grenada, Martinique, and Guadeloupe during the daylight hours of August 3. Gale warnings were in effect for Antigua from 11 am on August 3 until 11 am on August 4. Hurricane warnings were raised for Barbados, St. Vincent, St. Lucia, Martinique, and Dominica from the early afternoon of August 3 until the late morning of August 4. As Allen moved into the Caribbean sea, hurricane watches were issued for southeastern sections of the Dominican Republic and the southwestern peninsula of Haiti from 11 am on August 4 until the morning of August 5. Gale warnings were then in effect for the southern Dominican Republic from the night of August 4 into the night of August 5, while southern Haiti maintained the warnings from the night of August 4 into the morning of August 5. The hurricane watch was issued for Jamaica during the morning hours of August 5, while hurricane warnings were raised for the southwest peninsula of Haiti from the late morning of August 5 into the morning of August 6. Hurricane warnings went into effect for Jamaica from around noon on August 5 until late in the afternoon of August 6. The Cayman Islands saw hurricane watches issued from the afternoon of August 5 into the morning of August 6 before the watches were upgraded to hurricane warnings from the morning until late afternoon of August 6.

As Allen approached the Gulf of Mexico, hurricane warnings were raised for the northeast Yucatán peninsula of Mexico from the afternoon of August 6 into the morning of August 8. Gale warnings were in effect for the Florida Keys from the evening of August 6 into the early morning of August 8. As Allen approached its final landfall, the northeast Mexican coast and Texas coast were placed under a hurricane watch from the morning of August 8 until the morning of August 9 for Mexico and the afternoon of August 9 for Texas. Hurricane warnings were posted for the Texas coast during the afternoon of August 8, and were lowered north of Freeport, Texas during the afternoon of August 9 and south of Freeport during the afternoon of August 10. Gale warnings and a hurricane watch were issued for the Louisiana coast from Vermilion Bay westward from the afternoon of August 8 into the afternoon of August 9. Hurricane warnings were in effect for northeast Mexico from the early afternoon of August 9 into the late afternoon of August 10. Hurricane warnings were downgraded to gale warnings between High Island, Texas and Freeport, Texas between the late afternoon of August 9 and the late afternoon of August 10. Hurricane watches were dropped for the Louisiana coast during the late afternoon of August 9. Hurricane warnings were downgraded to gale warnings for the lower Texas coast south of Freeport from the late afternoon of August 10 into the early morning of August 11.

In addition to the various watches and warnings put in place ahead of Allen's arrival, various international governments took measures to prepare for the hurricane in Haiti. A disaster committee and executive committee to address the aftermath of the storm was formed by Haitian President Jean-Claude Duvalier, the latter of which was headed by members of the Haitian Ministry of Health and Hatian Red Cross, while members of the committees included representatives from the army, Pan American Health Organization (PAHO), United States Agency for International Development (USAID), and others. Emergency instructions were issued by the Haitian government to prevent possible increases in malaria cases following Allen's passage. The United States government made preparations to send personnel, as well as financial and aerial assistance, to Haiti. In neighboring Cuba, over 200,000 people across seven provinces were evacuated.

Tens of thousands of people evacuated the Texas coast before Allen's landfall, and forecasters advised that all areas within one mile of the coastline be cleared. The American Red Cross opened 109 shelters across Hidalgo County and in the city of Corpus Christi. Access to Padre Island National Seashore was cut off, and all visitors there and residents of Galveston Island were ordered to evacuate the respective areas. Six thousand people in lower Cameron Parish, Louisiana, 14,000 people in Port Lavaca, and additional residents of the low-lying suburbs of Houston, Texas were ordered to evacuate as well. A total of 2,500 troops were put on alert in Texas prior to the storm's passage.

== Impact ==
Deaths and damage by area
Country	Deaths	Damage	Source
Barbados	None	$6 million	
Cayman Islands	None		
Cuba	3		
Dominican Republic	7	$47 million	
Grenada	None	$5.3 million	
Guadeloupe	1	Unknown	
Haiti	220	$400 million	
Jamaica	8	$100 million	
Martinique	None	$68 million	
Mexico	None	None	
St. Lucia	18	$235 million	
St Vincent and The Grenadines	None	$16.3 million	
United States	7	$630 million	
Offshore	17	$60 million	
Total	281	$1.57 billion	

Allen caused just over $1 billion (1980 USD) in damages and killed at least 281 people throughout its course (including indirect deaths).

=== Caribbean ===
The island of St. Lucia sustained catastrophic damage from Allen when it was a strong category 3 hurricane. Sustained winds of 90 knots (170 km/h) and a sea level pressure as low as 967 millibars (28.6 inHg) were reported at Hewanorra. A total of $235 million in damage was incurred on the island. The country's banana crop was devastated, and its main hospital, Victoria Hospital, was left powerless and with part of its roof missing. Much of St. Lucia's telephone lines and other communications were down due to the storm, and foreign governments communicated with the island via ham radio. Eighteen people were killed as a result of the storm's passage. One death in Guadeloupe was attributed to Allen.

In Barbados, damages were estimated to be $6 million (1980 USD) by local officials, mostly to agriculture, housing and the local fishing industry. The highest recorded winds on the island were 68 knots (78 mph (126 km/h)) on its south side, though Allen likely brought much stronger winds of greater than 100 knots (115 mph (185 km/h)) on the northern part of Barbados under the eyewall of the hurricane. About 500 houses were either damaged or destroyed. No deaths were reported. 20 small boats were destroyed on the island and another 75 sustained damage. In Martinique, damage was extensive as the storm passed 50 miles (80 km) south of the island. Waves 6 metres (20 ft) high battered the coast of the island during the storm. Torrential rainfall caused damage to agriculture on Saint Vincent. Despite being located 250 mi (400 km) away from Allen's center as it passed to the south, Puerto Rico saw wind gusts of up to 70 mph (110 km/h) due to the hurricane.

In the central Caribbean, Cayman Brac was hit by winds in excess of 115 mph (185 km/h) which caused considerable property damage. A coral reef at Discovery Bay, Jamaica was devastated by the intense waves from the storm. Offshore Jamaica, greater numbers of smaller-sized Damselfishes were witnessed in the wake of Allen. Much of the capital city Kingston was left without power. Wind speeds of 100 mph (160 km/h) occurred along Jamaica's northern coast where Allen made its closest approach to the island. Storm surge and strong waves along Jamaica's northeastern coast damaged buildings, and 10 in (250 mm) to 20 in (510 mm) inches of rainfall was recorded. Eight deaths in Jamaica occurred due to Allen. Three additional deaths were attributed to Allen in Cuba. Citrus and tobacco crops were ruined on Isla de la Juventud. 25,000 exchange students were stuck on the island during Allen's passage. Additional coffee and banana crops across the Caribbean were devastated by the hurricane.

Extensive damage occurred in Haiti due to high winds and flash flooding. Total costs for that country were estimated to be at more than $400 million (1980 USD). 2.5 million people were affected by the storm, with an estimated 333,000 people considered at risk for food shortage. Roughly 60% of the nation's coffee crop was destroyed. In Port-au-Prince, Allen caused many fallen trees, local flooding, and temporary disruptions to electric power and telephone services. The island of Île-à-Vache had its food supply depleted and its entire water supply contaminated with salt water. At least 140 bodies were recovered from rural areas of the country in the wake of the storm. In all, 220 people were killed and 835,000 were left homeless by the catastrophic flooding and wind damage Allen caused in Haiti.

=== United States ===
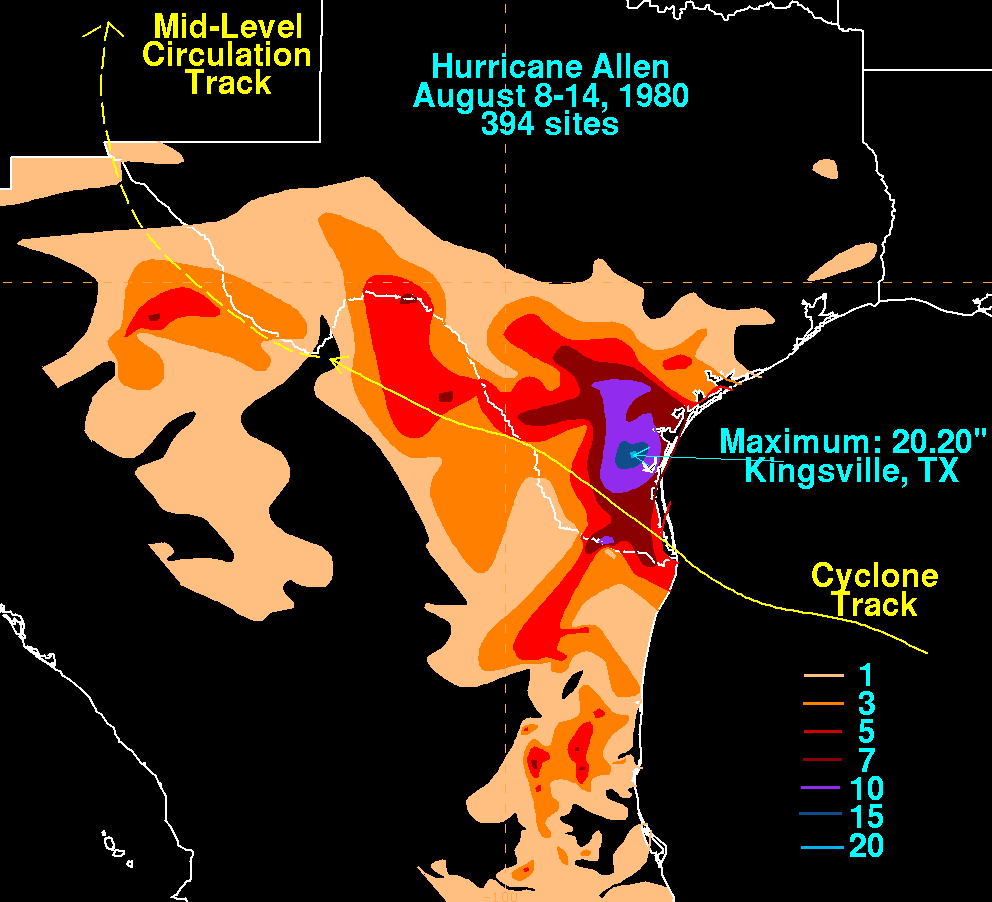
Hurricane Allen's rainfall across Texas and Mexico

In Texas, the storm surge was reported as high as 12 feet (3.7 m) at Port Mansfield, which caused major damage in the town, though it may have been higher elsewhere along the Texas coast. A peak wind gust of 129 mph (208 km/h) was also measured at Port Mansfield. Tropical storm-force winds in Corpus Christi, Texas blew roof gravel through the city, which led to substantial glass breakage to the 18-story Guarantee Bank Building and a 12-story wing of Spohn hospital. Allen dumped 15 to 20 inches (380 to 510 mm) of rain in south Texas along a 50 to 100 mile swath of land from the coast inland, ending a summer-long drought during the Heat Wave of 1980. The Nueces River peaked at 39 ft (12 m), 14 ft (4.3 m) above flood level.

The storm caused seven deaths in Texas and 17 in Louisiana, most in the latter state resulting from the crash of a helicopter evacuating workers from an offshore oil platform. Allen spawned several tornadoes in Texas; a total of 34 were reported in association with the hurricane, 11 of which were rated F2. One tornado caused an estimated $50 million in damage when it hit an airport in Austin, Texas. Two offshore oil rigs in the Gulf of Mexico were destroyed by Allen, and 13 people died in the aforementioned helicopter crash during the evacuation of a rig. A total of $600 million in damage was recorded in Texas due to Allen. Overall, however, the storm caused less damage than initially feared in the United States due to its suddenly diminished power, as well as its highest tides and winds hitting a sparsely populated portion of the Texas coast.

=== Elsewhere ===
Areas of northeastern Mexico saw heavy rains with the passage of Allen, with the highest totals exceeding 7 inches (180 mm). The hurricane earlier brushed the Yucatán Peninsula. As Allen only affected sparsely populated regions of Mexico, there were no reports of significant damage. The Panamanian freighter Georgios G went missing on August 5 on the way to Belize City with 25 people aboard. While information on the ship's fate is incomplete, it was likely intercepted by Allen on its course.

== Aftermath ==
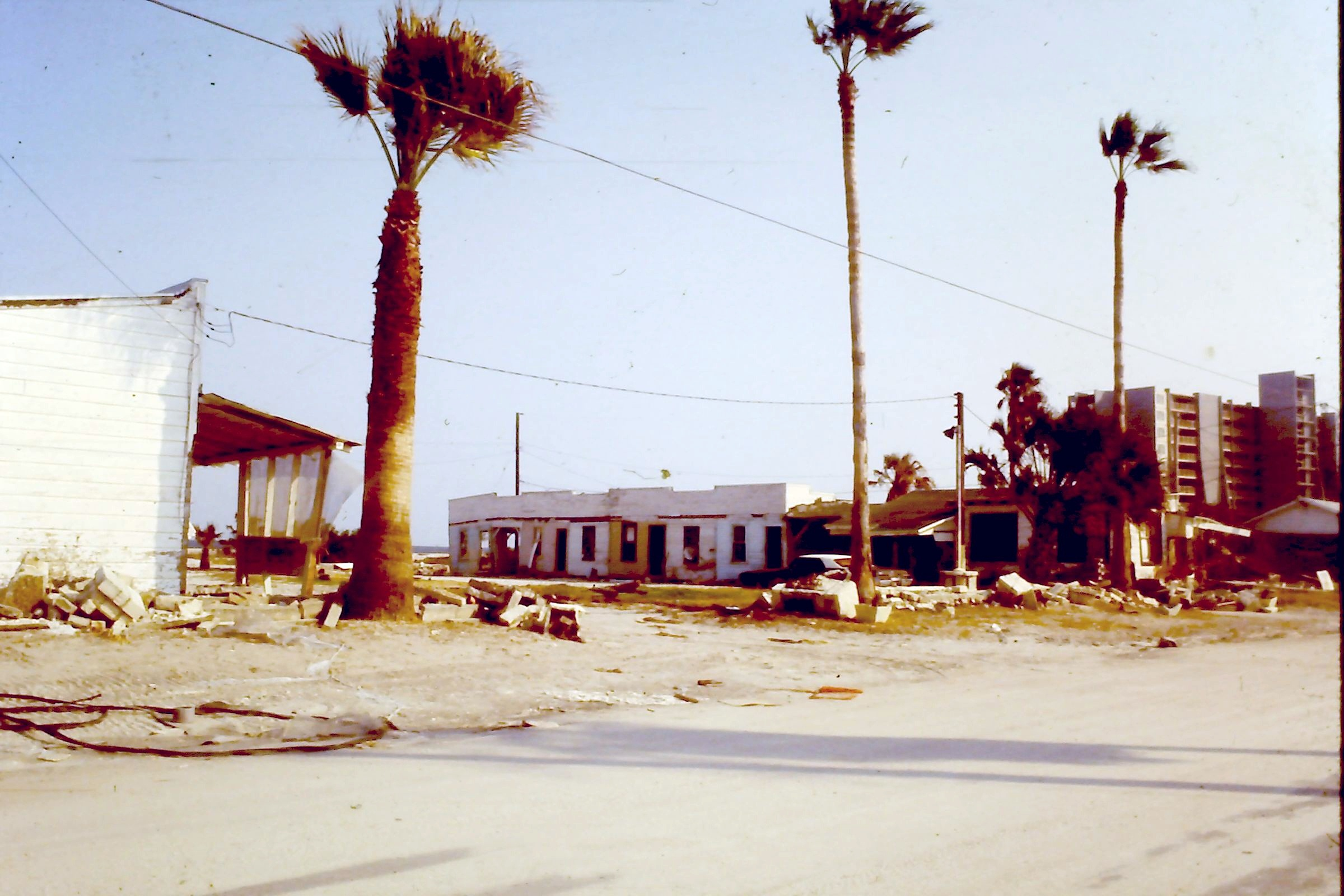
The ruins of several buildings in Corpus Christi after Hurricane Allen.

In the aftermath of Allen, the United States Department of Defense announced it would be providing aid to St. Lucia, Haiti and Jamaica. A C-130 cargo plane delivered humanitarian supplies and radios to St. Lucia. Two helicopters flew to the Haitian capital Port-au-Prince and three reconnaissance aircraft were sent to Jamaica, all for damage surveys. Haitian President Jean-Claude Duvalier declared Haiti's Tiburon Peninsula a disaster area. A network of ham radios was utilized to communicate with isolated victims of the hurricane across the eastern Caribbean. The Haitian Red Cross coordinated aid with other regional Red Crosses, needing supplies and food to support 50,000 people affected by Allen. Seeds were distributed to small farm owners to allow for the quick replant of crops lost in the storm. An island off the coast of Haiti with around 7,000 residents in need of urgent aid was reached by the USAID mission, bringing support personnel as well as sump pumps and water purification units to clean wells contaminated by salt water. US helicopters transported a total of 108,123 pounds of relief supplies and 10,793 gallons of water to Haiti; following this, all Department of Defense officials withdrew from the country by August 21. Concerns of a potential malaria outbreak due to expanses of standing water led Haiti's anti-malaria office to request the drug chloroquine from the US government. A total of 4.65 million chloroquine tablets were sent to Haiti in August and September 1980. Food-for-work programs organized by the Office of U.S. Foreign Disaster Assistance (OFDA) and Catholic Relief Services (CRS) provided reliable food sources for many storm victims and provided additional tools and seeds. A total of $1 million was made available for 2,300 tons of fertilizer, additional farming tools, and funds for the internal transport of food and the fertilizer. Only $664,963 ended up being spent on this agriculture project. A total of $9,534,370 was spent by the US government, $277,853 by private US organizations, $3,649,172 by foreign governments, and $5,675,766 by foreign voluntary agencies (mostly other Red Crosses) on providing aid in the form of direct financial contributions, food, and supplies to Haiti.

In St. Lucia, Agriculture Minister Peter Josie announced that 90% of the island's banana crop, 40% of its coconut crop, and 30% of its breadfruit trees were destroyed by Allen. In response, an emergency plan was implemented for the immediate replanting of vegetable and fruit crops due to the "very bleak" food situation. Josie also called for large investments of capital into rebuilding the severely disrupted shipping industry on the island, as 120 boats had been lost and 32 more damaged. US President Jimmy Carter declared six counties in southern Texas major disaster areas on August 11, allowing them to receive federal and state financing for cleanup from Allen. Seven American helicopters and 78 Americans assisted in the search for victims. Several stranded oil tankers had to be removed from the Gulf of Mexico, running the danger of a potential oil spill. The American Red Cross expected a $2 million expenditure for post-storm relief (as well as to shelter 136,000 evacuees during the storm's climax). Most hotels in southern Texas reported minimal damage from the storm and planned to resume normal operations not long after the storm dissipated. After various tankers were grounded in silt stirred up by the hurricane, the Federal Emergency Management Agency (FEMA) requested the Coast Guard to compile a list of all ships still at sea near southern Texas.

=== Retirement ===
Because of the hurricane's destructive impacts, the name Allen was retired from the Atlantic tropical storm name list by the World Meteorological Organization in the spring of 1981, and will never again be used for a future Atlantic hurricane. It was replaced with Andrew for the 1986 season.

== See also ==
- Timeline of the 1980 Atlantic hurricane season
- List of Category 5 Atlantic hurricanes
- Hurricane Carla (1961) – Category 4 hurricane that took a similar path
- Hurricane Beulah (1967) – Category 5 hurricane that took a similar path
- Hurricane Gilbert (1988) – Category 5 hurricane that took a similar path and impacted similar areas
- Hurricane Emily (2005) – Category 5 hurricane that took a similar path
- Hurricane Harvey (2017) – Category 4 hurricane that took a similar path
- Hurricane Beryl (2024) – Category 5 hurricane that took a similar path
