= 1980 United States heat wave =

Weather Disaster

The 1980 United States heat wave was a period of intense heat and drought that wreaked havoc on much of the Midwestern United States and Southern Plains throughout the summer of 1980. It was among the most destructive and deadliest natural disasters in U.S. history, claiming at least 1,700 lives. Because of the massive drought, agricultural damage reached US$20 billion (equivalent to $78 billion in 2025 dollars). It is among the billion-dollar weather disasters listed by the National Oceanic and Atmospheric Administration.

== Causes ==
The heat wave began in June when a strong high pressure ridge began to build in the central and southern United States allowing temperatures to soar to 90 °F (32 °C) almost every day from June to September. The high pressure system also acted as a cap on the atmosphere inhibiting the development of thunderstorm activity, leading to exceptionally severe drought conditions. The heat wave paused briefly when the decaying Hurricane Allen disrupted the prevailing weather pattern.

== Effects ==
The drought and heat wave conditions led many Midwestern cities to experience record heat. In Kansas City, Missouri, the high temperature was below 90 °F (32 °C) only twice and soared above the century mark (100 °F or 38 °C) for 17 days straight; in Memphis, Tennessee, the temperature reached an all-time high of 108 °F (42 °C) on July 13, 1980, part of a 15-day stretch of temperatures above 100 °F (38 °C) that lasted from July 6 to 20. In Indianapolis, Indiana on July 15, the temperature reached 100 °F (38 °C) for the first time since 1954.

In Dallas/Fort Worth, Texas, high temperatures exceeded 100 °F (38 °C) a total of 69 times, including a record 42 consecutive days from June 23 to August 3, of which 28 days were above 105, and five days above 110. The area saw 29 days in which the previous record high temperature was either broken or tied, including its all-time high when the temperature hit 113 °F (45 °C) on three consecutive days (June 26 and 27 at DFW Airport and June 28 at Dallas Love Field).

Some 43% of American homes were without air conditioning in 1980.

Hurricane Allen briefly paused the heat wave in early August. The 2011 North American heat wave would ultimately surpass the 1980 heat wave in terms of number of days with highs exceeding 100 (with 71 days) and the highest-ever low temperature for a single day (86 degrees); however, that heat wave only had 40 consecutive days of temperatures exceeding 100 (two short of the record) and the 113 degrees of 1980 remains a DFW all-time high. The high temperatures of the 1980 heat wave were worse than 2011, as was its early start in June and its ultimate human toll.

On the northern rim of the high pressure ridge, several severe long-lived windstorms called derechos formed. The most notable was the "More Trees Down Derecho" that occurred on July 5. It raced from eastern Nebraska to Virginia in 15 hours, killing six and injuring about 70. The Western Wisconsin Derecho of July 15 killed three, and caused extensive property damage.

== See also ==
- 1988–89 North American drought
- Extreme weather
- List of disasters
- List of disasters in the United States by death toll
- Meteorology
