= Western Wisconsin Derecho =

Weather event

- Shelf cloud as it approached Downsville, WI
- Date(s): July 15, 1980
- Peak wind gust (measured): 112 mph (180 km/h; 50.1 m/s)
- Tornado count: 10
- Strongest tornado^{1}: F3 tornado
- Fatalities: 3
- Damage costs: $240 million (1980)
- Areas affected: Wisconsin
- ^{1}Most severe tornado damage; see Fujita scale

The Western Wisconsin Derecho was a derecho, or severe weather system, that occurred through several counties of Western Wisconsin on July 15, 1980. It caused $240 million in damage (equivalent to $937.8 million in 2025) -- the largest storm damage total in Wisconsin history to that point. Three people died. The storm is still referred to as The July 15th Storm, July 15, 1980, or simply The Storm.

== Prelude ==
The storm developed during the devastating heat wave of 1980. Eight of the previous nine days in the Twin Cities had highs above 90 °F (32 °C). The high on July 11, 1980 was 100 °F (38 °C). On July 14, 1980, the day before the storm, the high was 99 °F (37 °C); the overnight low was a sticky 79 °F (26 °C).

== The storm ==
At 2 p.m. on the afternoon of July 15, 1980, a weak area of low pressure was stationed over eastern South Dakota, adjacent to a warm front that extended southeast through southern Minnesota into eastern Iowa. Ahead (north) of the warm front was an area of hot, dry air: the high temperature for the day at Eau Claire was 93 °F (34 °C) and 93 °F (34 °C) in the Twin Cities. South of the front was very humid, hot air: Cedar Rapids, Iowa had a high temperature of 98 °F (37 °C).

Weather radar at 9:39 p.m. showing the prominent bow echo west of the radar site

As the afternoon progressed, the warm front moved into the drier air to the north, pulling with it the moist air over the dry air. Regional meteorologists were aware of the potential for thunderstorms because of the low pressure system and the intense heat and moisture. The storm system formed in eastern Minnesota during the early evening of July 15, 1980, when a 30-year-old female boater was killed on Prior Lake. Winds were estimated at 110 mph (180 km/h). Storm damage in Minnesota approached $43 million.

Entering Wisconsin around 7:30 p.m., the storm devastated approximately 4,800 square miles (12,000 km^{2}) of St Croix, Pierce, Dunn, Eau Claire, Chippewa, and Clark counties; the band of damage was more than 40 miles (64 km) wide. The greatest destruction occurred from Menomonie through Eau Claire. A maximum wind speed of 97 knots (180 km/h; 112 mph) was recorded at the Chippewa Valley Regional Airport at 8:48 p.m., blowing away the airport's anemometer; 100 mph (160 km/h) wind was recorded in the city of Eau Claire. At 9:39 p.m., WEAU-TV broadcast an alert from the National Weather Service regarding one of several tornado warnings that evening for Eau Claire County; moments later, the station lost power and went off-the-air. Seven of the city's eight radio stations were still off-the-air the next morning. Up to 97 percent of Northern States Power customers in Eau Claire were left without power following the storm. After seven days, 20,000 customers still had no power.

By 10 p.m., with the most intense part of the storm winding down, the area of low pressure was directly over western Wisconsin. Behind the low, air had cooled considerably, with the Twin Cities reporting temperatures in the upper 60s (°F). In addition to being tremendously destructive, the storm was considerably long-lived. The same system produced severe derechos through Illinois and Michigan overnight and into the following day. The system was estimated to have caused $650 million ($2.54 billion in 2025) in damage across the four states.

== Tornadoes ==
Although much of the storm's damage was caused by straight-line winds (see downburst), several tornadoes were reported.

Confirmed tornadoes by Fujita rating
FU	F0	F1	F2	F3	F4	F5	Total
0	2	4	3	1	0	0	10

=== July 15 event ===
List of reported tornadoes - Tuesday, July 15, 1980
F#	County	Coord.	Time (UTC)	Path length	Damage
Wisconsin
F3	Eau Claire	44.83°N 91.52°W	0225	1 mile (1.6 km)	1 Death 10 Injuries 3/4-mile-wide tornado briefly touched down causing US$2.5 million in damages. Strongest tornado during the three-hour event.
F1	Eau Claire	44.77°N 91.27°W	0240	0.3 miles (0.5 km)	Brief touchdown, caused $25,000 in damages.
F2	Chippewa	44.87°N 91.48°W	0240	0.2 miles (0.3 km)	1 Death 5 Injuries Brief touchdown, caused $2.5 million in damages.
F2	St. Croix, Dunn	45.08°N 92.17°W	0245	unknown	1 Death 12 Injuries Caused $2.5 million in damages.
F1	Chippewa	44.92°N 91.43°W	0245	0.1 miles (0.2 km)	Brief touchdown, caused $2,500 in damages.
F0	Chippewa	44.92°N 91.45°W	0245	0.1 miles (0.2 km)	Brief touchdown, no damage reported.
F2	Eau Claire	44.62°N 91.18°W	0250	2.7 miles (4.3 km)	Brief touchdown, caused $250,000 in damages.
F0	Chippewa	44.92°N 91.25°W	0307	0.1 miles (0.2 km)	Brief touchdown, no damage reported.
F1	Clark	44.93°N 90.87°W	0507	0.1 miles (0.2 km)	Brief touchdown, no damage reported.
F1	Eau Claire	44.7°N 91.48°W	0508	0.1 miles (0.2 km)	Brief touchdown, no damage reported.

== Aftermath ==
One hard-hit area of Eau Claire was the Mill Run subdivision, at the time a part of the Town of Union, now a neighborhood on the city's north side. Many homes in the neighborhood were destroyed. Across US-12 from Mill Run are the headquarters of the home improvement retailer Menards, which also sustained major damage. Six residents of the Stardust Estates mobile home court were injured in the storm.

A 25-year-old Dunn County woman was killed when a refrigerator in her mobile home fell on her during the storm.

=== Farm losses ===
Farm property was hit very hard, with Dunn County receiving the worst damage. It was estimated that more than $27M of damage was done just to farm buildings in that county, and $8M in crops. More than 10,000 farms were initially without power after the storm. Wisconsin National Guard and the DNR delivered water to farms. There were reports of cattle that had gone without water for 36 hours.

Numerous concrete stave silos on the small Wisconsin dairy farms were blown in half with only the bottom half showing.

It also caused the bankruptcy of the Martel Mutual Fire Insurance Company, which inexplicably did not have re-insurance coverage. Thus, many farmers had to pay hundreds or thousands of dollars in assessments to cover the final losses of the insurance company.

=== Political controversy ===
Four counties affected by the storm were declared federal disaster areas on 24 July by President Jimmy Carter. Approximately $3.3M of public property in Eau Claire County was damaged in the storm. The Federal Emergency Management Agency (FEMA) would have covered that entire amount in theory. But at some point that year, the rule was changed on what FEMA would cover, which amounted to only 75%. That left better more than $800,000 for Wisconsin to pay. No one notified the states when the rule was changed.

Theories for the change in coverage include the massive influx of Cubans into the country; the Mount St. Helens eruption of 18 May; the severe tornadoes in Grand Island, Nebraska in June; and flooding in western Pennsylvania during August. The federal government's budget was badly impacted by these and other disasters. In all, there were 22 major disaster declarations in 1980.

Compounding problems for the state was that the storm occurred in an election year. Frustrated Wisconsin officials, including Governor Lee Dreyfus, were not prepared for the difficulty in dealing with the federal government during such a time.

== Property damage (1980 dollars) ==
- Total damage was initially estimated at nearly $160 million.
  - Eau Claire County $60,983,650
  - Dunn County: $38,572,000
  - Pierce County: $29,557,000
  - Chippewa County: $10,675,000
  - Public property: $7,359,500
  - Timber losses: $14,518,000
- Later calculations brought the number to $240 million.
  - Public facilities such as electric cooperatives, highways, and highway signs: $26,500,000
  - Private property (excluding rural structures): $87,200,000
  - Agricultural losses: $104,300,000
  - Lost wages due to power outages: $4,800,000
  - Timber losses: $16,500,000

== See also ==
- List of derecho events
