= Tornado outbreak of February 23, 1965 =

Extreme weather event in Florida, US

Tornado outbreak
- Tornadoes: 4
- Max. rating: F3 tornado
- Duration: February 23, 1965

Overall effects
- Fatalities: 0
- Injuries: 8
- Damage: $302,500 (1965 USD) (Note: All losses are in 1965 USD unless otherwise noted.) $3.09 million (2025 USD)
- Areas affected: South Florida
- Part of the tornadoes and tornado outbreaks of 1965

On Tuesday, February 23, 1965, a small, localized tornado outbreak affected southern portions of the U.S. state of Florida. At least four confirmed tornadoes touched down between 10 a.m.–1 p.m. EST (15:00–18:00 UTC); the strongest tornado moved through the Fort Lauderdale area and produced F3 damage on the Fujita scale, injuring six people. In addition, an F1 tornado also moved through northern Broward and southern Palm Beach counties. Two tornadoes also affected Lee County, producing F2 and F1 damage, respectively. (Note: An outbreak is generally defined as a group of at least six tornadoes with no more than a six-hour gap between individual tornadoes; however, the threshold varies slightly according to local climatology. On the Florida peninsula, an outbreak consists of at least four tornadoes occurring relatively synchronously—no more than four hours apart.) (Note: The Fujita scale was devised under the aegis of scientist T. Theodore Fujita in the early 1970s. Prior to the advent of the scale in 1971, tornadoes in the United States were officially unrated. While the Fujita scale has been superseded by the Enhanced Fujita scale in the U.S. since February 1, 2007, Canada used the old scale until April 1, 2013; nations elsewhere, like the United Kingdom, apply other classifications such as the TORRO scale.) (Note: Historically, the number of tornadoes globally and in the United States was and is likely underrepresented: research by Grazulis on annual tornado activity suggests that, as of 2001, only 53% of yearly U.S. tornadoes were officially recorded. Documentation of tornadoes outside the United States was historically less exhaustive, owing to the lack of monitors in many nations and, in some cases, to internal political controls on public information. Most countries only recorded tornadoes that produced severe damage or loss of life. Significant low biases in U.S. tornado counts likely occurred through the early 1990s, when advanced NEXRAD was first installed and the National Weather Service began comprehensively verifying tornado occurrences.)

== Confirmed tornadoes ==
Confirmed tornadoes by Fujita rating
FU	F0	F1	F2	F3	F4	F5	Total
0	0	2	1	1	0	0	4*

- A tornado reportedly damaged three residences in a pair of duplexes in Lehigh Acres, injuring a person with airborne glass, flaying the paint on a vehicle with pebbles, pulling up roofing, and scattering TV antennae, garbage cans, and awnings. However, this was officially classified as a severe thunderstorm wind.

Confirmed tornadoes – Tuesday, February 23, 1965 (Note: All dates are based on the local time zone where the tornado touched down; however, all times are in Coordinated Universal Time and dates are split at midnight CST/CDT for consistency.) (Note: Prior to 1994, only the average widths of tornado paths were officially listed.)
F#	Location	County / Parish	State	Start coord.	Time (UTC)	Path length	Max. width	Damage
F1	Western Pompano Beach to Delray Beach	Broward, Palm Beach	FL	26.25°N 80.20°W	15:50–?	14.1 mi (22.7 km)	33 yd (30 m)	$2,500
F1	This tornado produced intermittent, minor damage, mainly to trees and fences. A small, rural barn was destroyed as well. Losses totaled $2,500.							
F3	Southwestern Fort Lauderdale to southeastern Oakland Park	Broward	FL	26.10°N 80.17°W	16:15–?	5.7 mi (9.2 km)	60 yd (55 m)	$250,000
F3	See section on this tornado							
F1	Iona	Lee	FL	26.50°N 81.75°W	17:45–?	0.1 mi (0.16 km)	33 yd (30 m)	$25,000
F1	This tornado substantially damaged saran housing and vegetation at a plant nursery. A mother and infant were injured in a trailer. Losses totaled $25,000.							
F2	Fort Myers	Lee	FL	26.62°N 81.87°W	17:45–?	0.5 mi (0.80 km)	67 yd (61 m)	$25,000
F2	Various structures and small homes were either partly unroofed or extensively damaged. A metal structure at a factory was damaged, skylights and windows were smashed, a built-up roof was mostly pulled off its sheathing, a shed and awnings were blown away, a carport was shifted, and a pair of trucks were tipped sideways. Additionally, a 40-foot-long (13 yd), 12-foot-tall (4.0 yd) CMU wall was downed, while a similar but smaller wall elsewhere was bent 2 ft (0.67 yd) outward. Losses totaled $25,000. Grazulis did not list this tornado as an F2 or stronger.							

=== Fort Lauderdale–Oakland Park, Florida ===
Fort Lauderdale–Oakland Park, Florida
Meteorological history
- Formed: February 23, 1965, 11:15 a.m. EST (UTC−05:00)

F3 tornado
- on the Fujita scale

Overall effects
- Casualties: 6 injuries
- Damage: $250,000 (1965 USD) $2.55 million (2025 USD)

The second tornado touched down near Chula Vista and moved north-northeast across western portions of the city of Fort Lauderdale, affecting a 1-square-mile (2.6 km^{2}) area, or 40 blocks, of the city. The small funnel was visible from a jetliner awaiting takeoff at Fort Lauderdale International Airport. Later, it briefly lifted prior to touching down in Oakland Park, and it dissipated northeast of Wilton Manors. Though three funnel clouds occurred along the path, only one tornado developed. One home was destroyed, while seven trailers, three cars, and a pair of trucks received severe damage. Most of the damage affected a marina and a trailer park, though damage to power poles left about 2,400 residents powerless. 75 small watercraft were damaged at the marina, along with the clubhouse. The width of the damage path averaged 60 yd (180 ft), but occasionally reached 100 yd (300 ft). The tornado caused six injuries, three of them due to airborne debris, and at least $140,000–$300,000 in damages (NCEI lists damages as $250,000). The tornado is officially estimated to have been an F3 event. It remains the second of only three F/EF3 tornadoes to affect Broward County since 1950; the others occurred on April 10, 1956, and March 1, 1980. However, tornado researcher Thomas P. Grazulis classified the tornado as an F2.

== Non-tornadic effects ==
In addition to tornadoes, multiple funnel clouds occurred over at least two counties in southern Florida, and at least one waterspout touched down near West Palm Beach.

== See also ==
- List of North American tornadoes and tornado outbreaks
- Hurricane Isbell tornado outbreak – One of the largest outbreaks on record in South Florida

== Sources ==
- Brooks, Harold E. (April 2004). "On the Relationship of Tornado Path Length and Width to Intensity". Weather and Forecasting. 19 (2). Boston: American Meteorological Society: 310–19. Bibcode:2004WtFor..19..310B. doi:10.1175/1520-0434(2004)019<0310:OTROTP>2.0.CO;2.
- Cook, A. R.; Schaefer, J. T. (August 2008). Written at Norman, Oklahoma. "The Relation of El Niño–Southern Oscillation (ENSO) to Winter Tornado Outbreaks". Monthly Weather Review. 136 (8). Boston: American Meteorological Society: 3135. Bibcode:2008MWRv..136.3121C. doi:10.1175/2007MWR2171.1.
- Grazulis, Thomas P. (November 1990). Significant Tornadoes 1880–1989. Vol. 2. St. Johnsbury, Vermont: The Tornado Project of Environmental Films. ISBN 1-879362-02-3.
- Grazulis, Thomas P. (July 1993). Significant Tornadoes 1680–1991: A Chronology and Analysis of Events. St. Johnsbury, Vermont: The Tornado Project of Environmental Films. ISBN 1-879362-03-1.
- Grazulis, Thomas P. (2001a). The Tornado: Nature's Ultimate Windstorm. Norman: University of Oklahoma Press. ISBN 978-0-8061-3538-0.
- Grazulis, Thomas P. (2001b). F5-F6 Tornadoes. St. Johnsbury, Vermont: The Tornado Project of Environmental Films.
- Hagemeyer, Bartlett C. (September 1997). "Peninsular Florida Tornado Outbreaks". Weather and Forecasting. 12 (3). Boston: American Meteorological Society: 400. Bibcode:1997WtFor..12..399H. doi:10.1175/1520-0434(1997)012<0399:PFTO>2.0.CO;2.
- National Weather Service (February 1965). Storm Data Publication (Report). National Centers for Environmental Information – via Storm Events Database.
- U.S. Weather Bureau (February 1965). "Storm Data and Unusual Weather Phenomena". Storm Data. 7 (2). Asheville, North Carolina: National Climatic Data Center.
