= Tornadoes of 1972 =

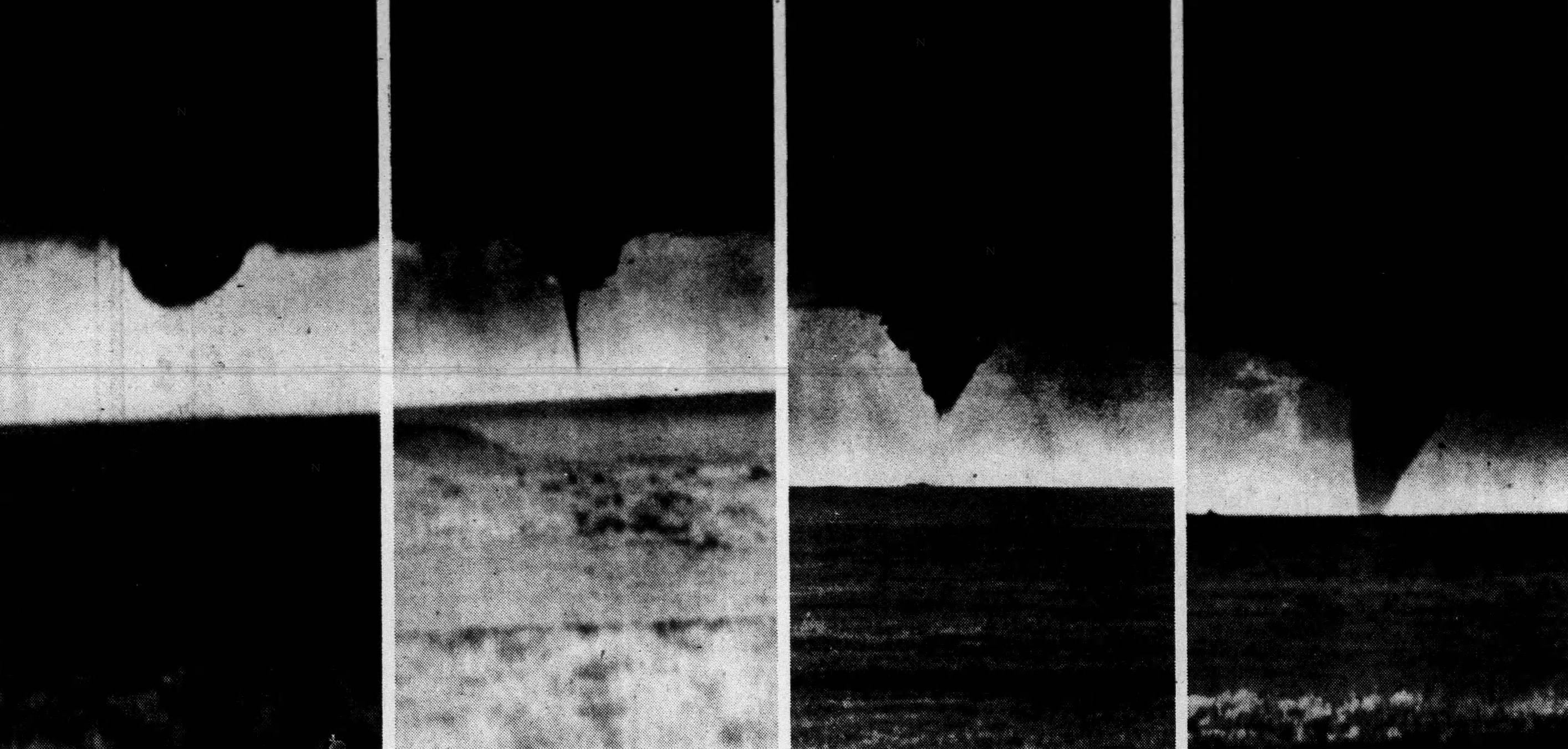
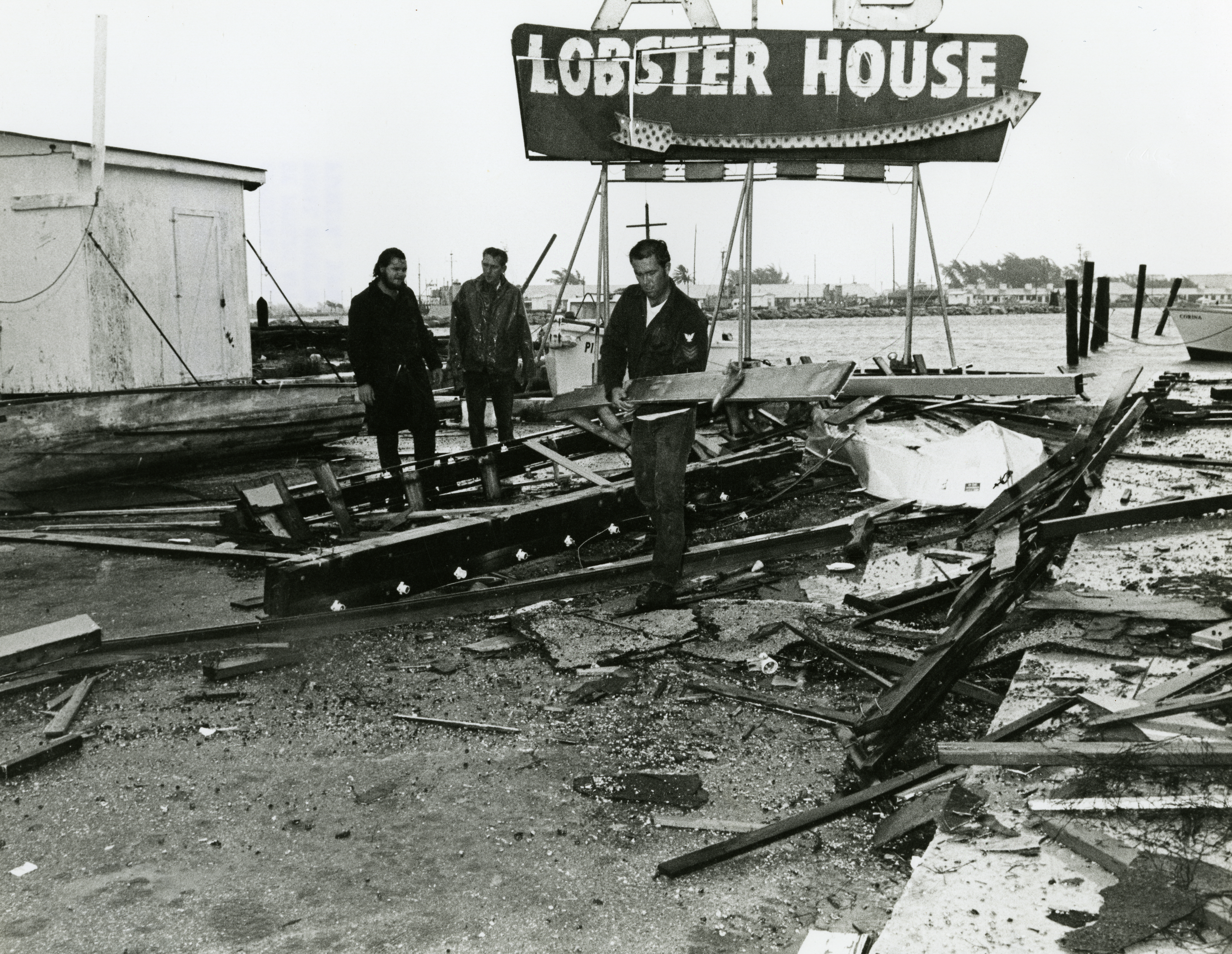
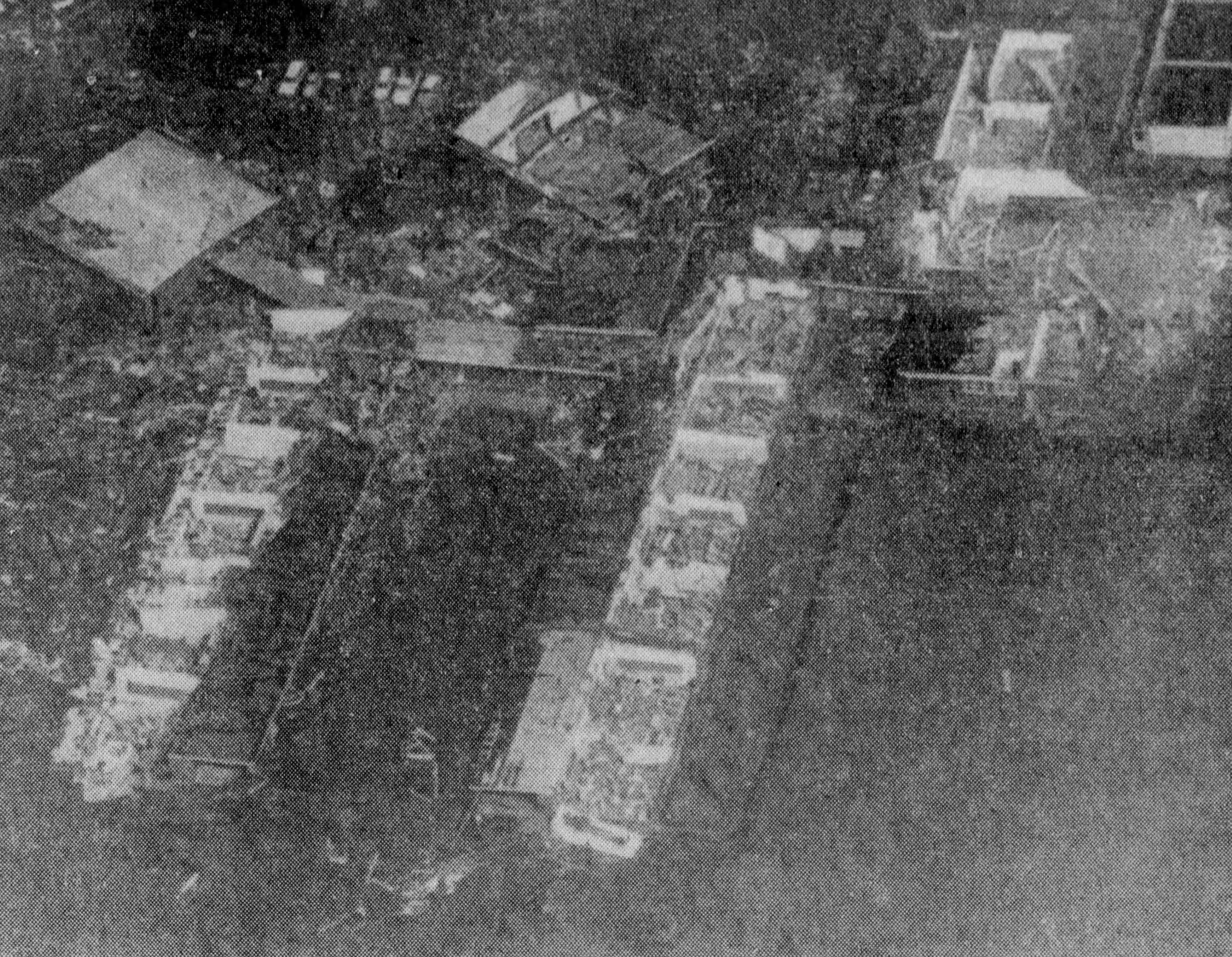
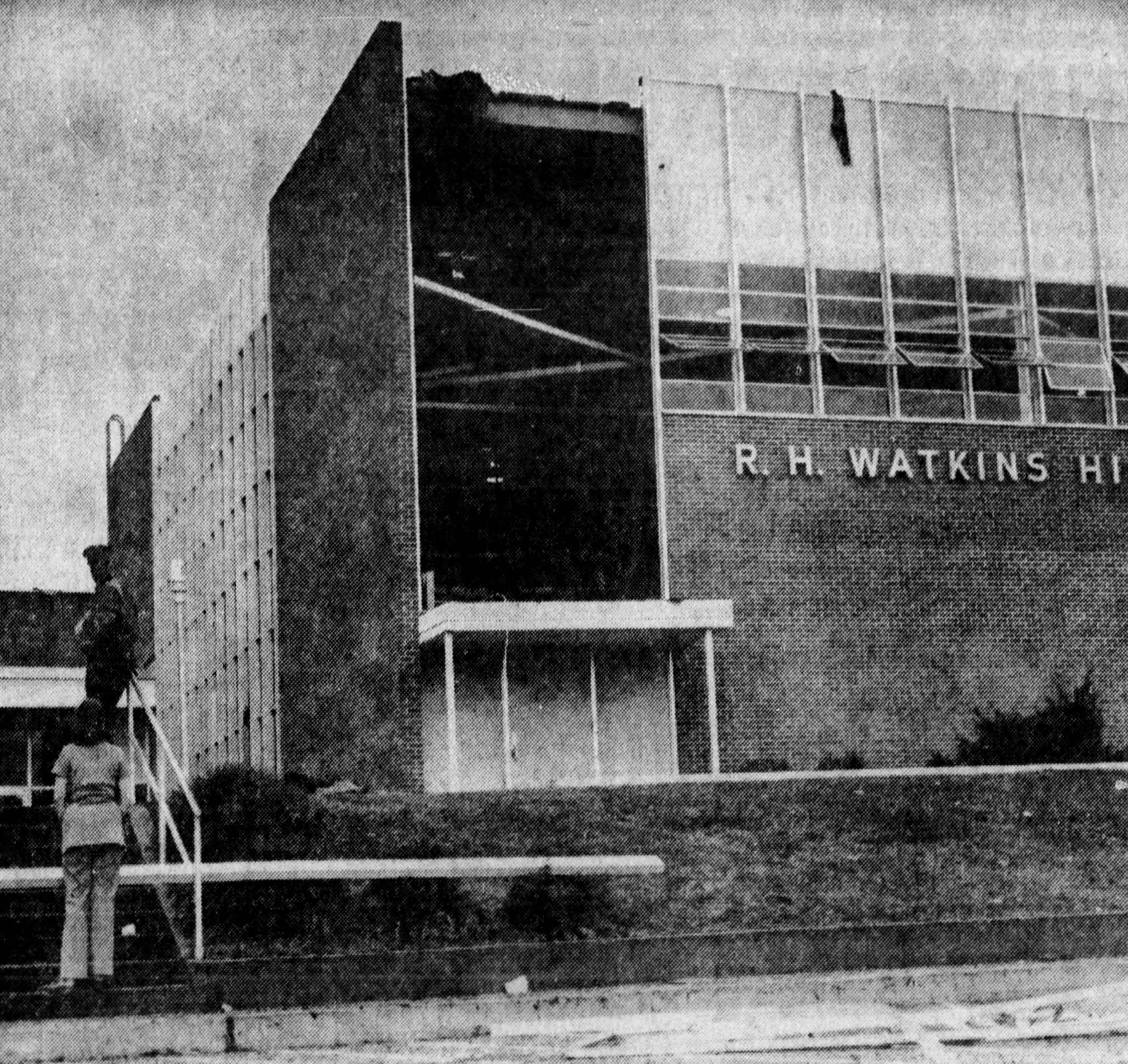
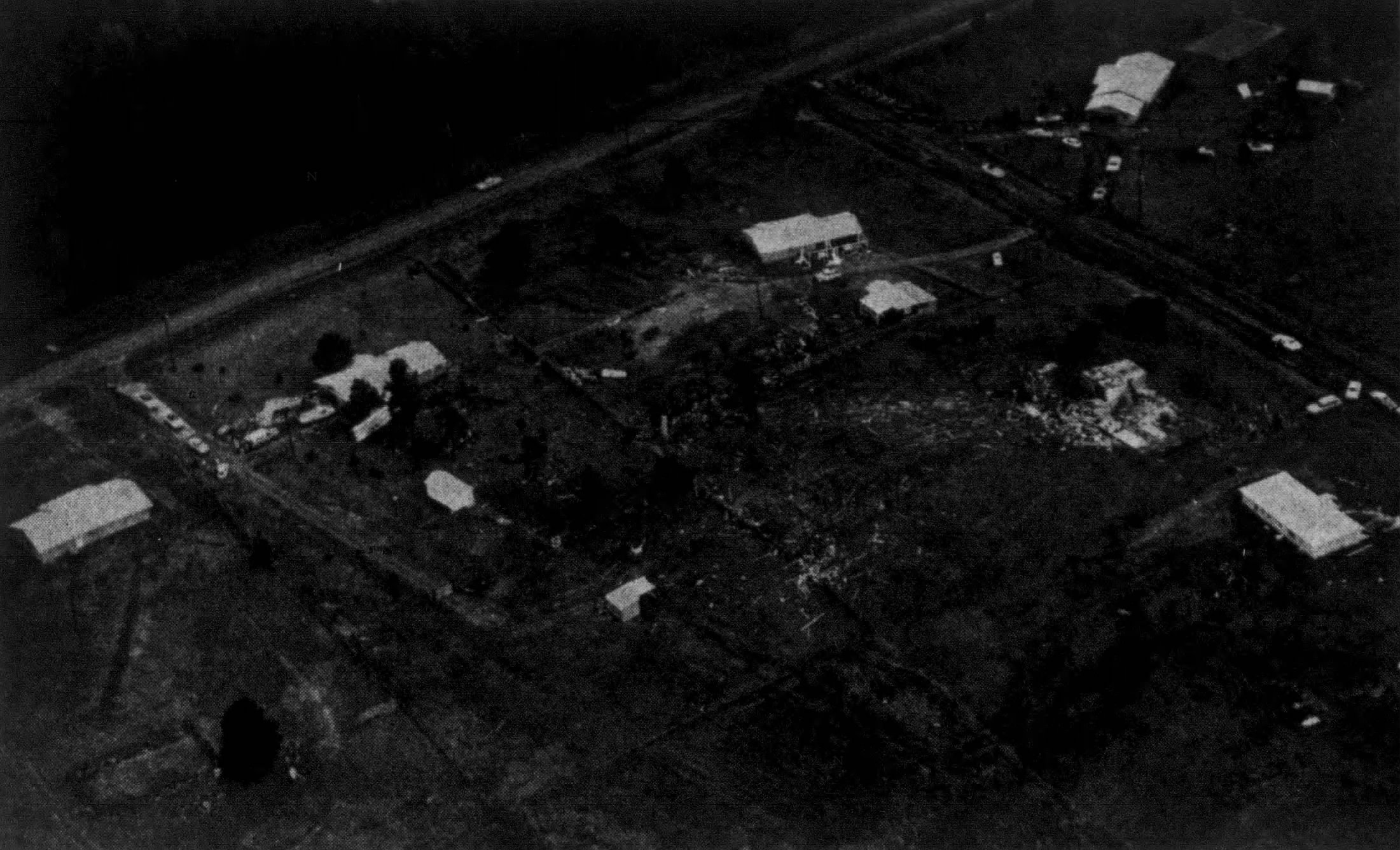
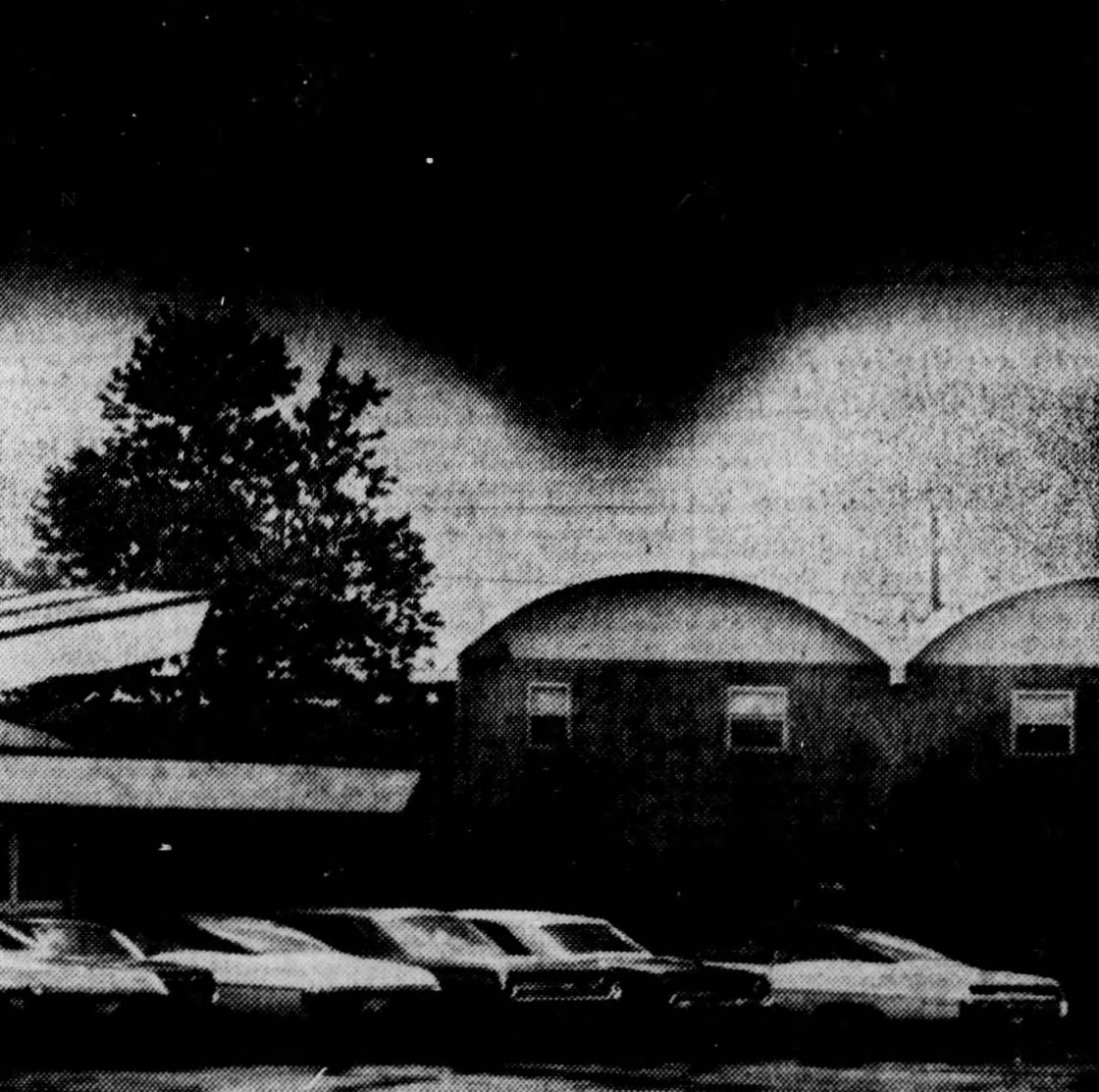
- Clockwise from top: A series of photos showing an F1 tornado near Gruver, Texas on June 15; Damage to a school in Vancouver, Washington after an F3 tornado on April 5; Damage in Harrison County, Texas after an F3 tornado on October 22; An F4 tornado shortly after formation in Indianapolis, Indiana on May 14; Damage to a school in Laurel, Mississippi after an F3 tornado on January 9; Damage in the Florida Keys after an F2 tornado spawned by Hurricane Agnes on June 17.
- Timespan: January 1, 1972 – December 30, 1972
- Maximum rated tornado: F4 tornado: Ratliff City, Oklahoma on April 19; Jetmore, Kansas on April 30; Indianapolis, Indiana on May 14; Waukegan, Illinois on September 28
- Tornadoes in U.S.: 741
- Damage (U.S.): Unknown
- Fatalities (U.S.): 34
- Fatalities (worldwide): >34

This page documents the tornadoes and tornado outbreaks of 1972, primarily in the United States. Most tornadoes form in the U.S., although some events may take place internationally. Tornado statistics for older years like this often appear significantly lower than modern years due to fewer reports or confirmed tornadoes.

== Synopsis ==
Fatal United States tornadoes in 1972
- Approximate touchdown location of killer tornadoes in 1972
Summary of tornadoes
- January 10 – Georgia (1 death)
- January 13 – Alabama (4 deaths)
- April 5 – Oregon, Washington (6 deaths)
- April 6 – Illinois (1 death)
- April 6 – Illinois (1 death)
- April 19 – Oklahoma (5 deaths)
- April 21 – Illinois (3 deaths)
- June 18 – Florida (1 death)
- June 18 – Florida (6 deaths)
- June 20 – Ohio (1 death)
- June 25 – Florida (1 death)
- August 7 – New York (1 death)
- August 9 – Massachusetts (1 death)
- November 13 – Texas (2 deaths)
Total fatalities: 34

1972 was a near normal year, producing 741 tornadoes. Deaths were significantly below average, but there was a very high total of over 900 injuries.

== Events ==
=== United States yearly total ===
Confirmed tornadoes by Fujita rating
FU	F0	F1	F2	F3	F4	F5	Total
0	174	345	181	37	4	0	741

== January ==
33 tornadoes were reported in the United States in January.

=== January 13 ===
FU	F0	F1	F2	F3	F4	F5
0	1	7	4	2	0	0

On January 13, tornadoes touched down across portions of Alabama, Georgia, and South Carolina. An F2 tornado struck Fort Rucker and two nearby trailer parks occupied by army dependents. The tornado destroyed 68 trailers, killing four people and injuring 88. An F3 tornado (possibly two tornadoes) traveled from east of Wadley to Waynesboro, Georgia, injuring 21 people. An F2 tornado destroyed two homes southwest of Pelham, Georgia, carrying the residents of one home approximately 200 yards without injuring them.

== February ==
7 tornadoes were reported in the United States in February.

== March ==
69 tornadoes were reported in the United States in March.

=== March 26–29 ===
FU	F0	F1	F2	F3	F4	F5
0	5	7	5	1	0	0

A front moved through Texas, Arkansas, Louisiana, Alabama, and Florida on the days of March 26–29, producing an F3 tornado that struck Urbana, Arkansas and an F2 that injured 13 people in Lufkin, Texas. A suspected F2 tornado hit Hillsboro, Texas, injuring 2 people and causing at least $500,000 (1972 USD) in damages. The outbreak produced an F2 that touched down outside of El Dorado, Arkansas, injuring 3 people and causing major damage. An F1 tornado touched down in Milton, Florida, injuring 1 person. The outbreak ended with no fatalities but 19 injuries.

== April ==
96 tornadoes were reported in the United States in April.

=== April 5 ===
FU	F0	F1	F2	F3	F4	F5
0	0	0	2	2	0	0

An unusual series of strong tornadoes struck Oregon and Washington. The worst event was when a deadly F3 tornado struck Portland, Oregon and Vancouver, Washington. The tornado carved a 8.7 mile path of destruction across the heavily populated Portland metropolitan area, leaving 6 people dead and 300 injured while causing $3–5 million (1972 USD) in damage. It was the deadliest tornado in the United States in 1972 and remains the deadliest tornado in the history of the Pacific Northwest. It was the first F3 tornado to strike Oregon since June 3, 1894. Later that day, three more strong tornadoes touched down in Washington. The first was an F2 tornado near Hartline, while the second was an even stronger F3 tornado that injured one near Creston. The final tornado was an F2 tornado that moved through areas west-southwest of Kettle Falls. This remains the strongest tornado outbreak to hit the region since 1950. In the aftermath, 6 people had died and 301 others were hurt.

=== April 19–22 ===
FU	F0	F1	F2	F3	F4	F5
0	1	14	10	6	1	0

A large and destructive outbreak of 28 tornadoes tore through the Great Plains, Mississippi Valley, and Southeast. On April 19, a violent F4 tornado in Carter, Murray, Garvin Counties in Oklahoma killed five and injured six. Overall, the outbreak killed eight and injured 42.

=== April 29 – May 2 ===
FU	F0	F1	F2	F3	F4	F5
0	4	5	4	7	1	0

A very intense outbreak sequence of 21 tornadoes struck the Great Plains, Midwest, and Northeast during the transition from April into May. On April 29, an F4 tornado passed near Jetmore, Kansas, injuring one. Overall, nobody was killed but 12 people were injured in the outbreak.

== May ==
140 tornadoes were reported in United States in May.

=== May 14–15 ===
FU	F0	F1	F2	F3	F4	F5
0	3	2	1	1	1	0

A small but damaging outbreak of eight tornadoes struck the Midwest and Southeast. The worst event occurred on May 14, when a violent F4 tornado caused major damage in Indianapolis. The tornado was first seen by people near the 9700 block of East Washington Street. The tornado blew the second-floor wall off of an apartment building. Three high-tension towers were also blown down and bent. The worst damage occurred in the Heather Hills subdivision where ten houses were flattened. In Marion County, at least 70 homes were damaged or destroyed. In Mount Comfort, clocks were stopped at 12:25 P.M. in houses as they were being destroyed and a railroad car was tipped over. Near Eden, roofs were damaged and trees were damaged. Northwest of Markleville, several mobile homes were severely damaged. In Mechanicsburg, a barn's roof was uplifted. A total of 20 people were injured by the tornado, which is deemed as the strongest tornado to touch down in the Indianapolis area. Overall, the outbreak injured 27.

== June ==
114 tornadoes were reported in the United States in June.

=== June 18–19 ===
FU	F0	F1	F2	F3	F4	F5
0	1	7	9	2	0	0

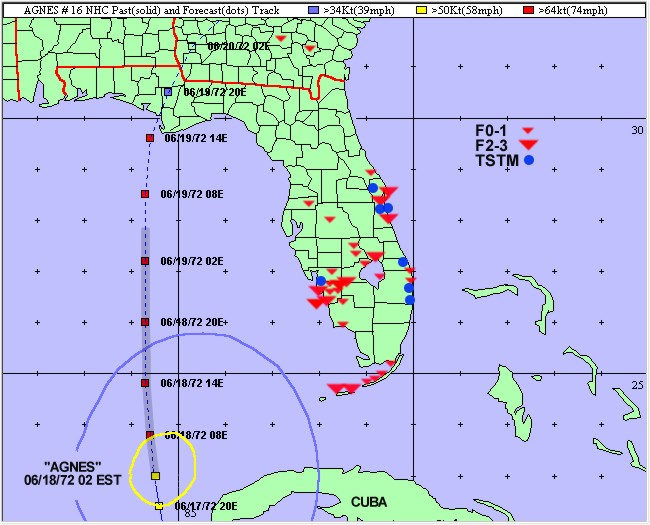
Plots of the tornadoes caused by Hurricane Agnes.

Hurricane Agnes made landfall in Florida, producing tornadoes that killed seven people.

== July ==
115 tornadoes were reported in the United States in July.

== August ==
59 tornadoes were reported in the United States in August.

=== August 10 ===
A rare, narrow and brief F3 tornado struck Chino Valley, Arizona. No casualties were reported.

== September ==
49 tornadoes were reported in the United States in September.

=== September 28–30 ===
FU	F0	F1	F2	F3	F4	F5
0	1	5	4	1	1	0

An F4 tornado hit Waukegan, Illinois, injuring 20. At least 11 other tornadoes were also associated with this outbreak, which as a whole injured 27.

== October ==
34 tornadoes were reported in the United States in October.

=== October 21–22 ===
An F2 tornado struck Waco, Texas, dealing an estimated 1.25 million USD in damages, and 3 injuries at the Heart O' Texas Fairgrounds.

On the 22nd, an F3 tornado struck Idabel, Oklahoma in the early morning hours, following a skipping path in the north part of the city. It traveled along a 1.5 mile long path, resulting in 1 injury. The same storm produced another tornado shortly after the first lifted, which was rated F2. In Texas, another F3 struck south-east of Marshall. Crossing I-20, it destroyed a home and damaged another. There were 2 injuries in the destroyed home.

== November ==
17 tornadoes were reported in the United States in November.

=== November 12–13 ===
FU	F0	F1	F2	F3	F4	F5
0	1	8	5	0	0	0

An outbreak of 14 tornadoes struck the Southeast. In the early morning hours of November 13, an F2 tornado struck areas south of Nancy, Texas killing two people. Overall, the outbreak killed two and injured five.

== December ==
8 tornadoes were reported in the United States in December.

=== December 29 ===
An F2 tornado traveled 30 miles through northeastern Oklahoma, starting near the community of Ketchum, and was reported to follow a skipping path. The tornado ripped the front of a home off near Ketchum, leaving the 2 occupants uninjured.

== See also ==
- Tornado
  - Tornadoes by year
  - Tornado records
  - Tornado climatology
  - Tornado myths
- List of tornado outbreaks
  - List of F5 and EF5 tornadoes
  - List of North American tornadoes and tornado outbreaks
  - List of 21st-century Canadian tornadoes and tornado outbreaks
  - List of European tornadoes and tornado outbreaks
  - List of tornadoes and tornado outbreaks in Asia
  - List of Southern Hemisphere tornadoes and tornado outbreaks
  - List of tornadoes striking downtown areas
- Tornado intensity
  - Fujita scale
  - Enhanced Fujita scale
