= 1972 Portland–Vancouver tornadoes =

F-3 tornado that impacted Washington and Oregon in 1972

Meteorological history
- Duration: April 5, 1972

Tornado outbreak
- Tornadoes: 4
- Max. rating: F3 tornado
- Duration: 6 hours
- Highest winds: 65 mph (105 km/h); Portland International Airport

Overall effects
- Casualties: 6 fatalities, 301 injuries
- Damage: $25.55 million (1972 USD)
- Areas affected: Northern Oregon, Washington

The 1972 Portland–Vancouver tornadoes were caused by an unusually intense squall line with embedded strong tornadoes that struck Oregon and Washington on Wednesday, April 5, 1972. Of the four tornadoes, the most catastrophic event was a deadly F3 tornado that struck Portland, Oregon, and Vancouver, Washington, the first F3 tornado to strike Oregon since June 3, 1894. It tracked 8.7 miles (14.0 km) across the heavily populated Portland–Vancouver metropolitan area, causing heavy damage, killing six people, and injuring 300 while causing $25.25 million (1972 USD) in damage. It was tied as the deadliest tornado in the United States in 1972 and remains the deadliest tornado in the history of the Pacific Northwest. In all, the outbreak killed six, injured 301, and caused $25.55 million in damage.

== Meteorological synopsis ==
A sharp cold front triggered an intense squall line that moved into the Pacific Northwest during the late morning hours of April 5, 1972. After moving inland, the storms produced strong winds, large hail, and tornadoes to the region. Weakening of the storms did not take place until late that evening; by then storms had moved over 50 miles (80 km) inland.

== Confirmed tornadoes ==
Confirmed tornadoes by Fujita rating
FU	F0	F1	F2	F3	F4	F5	Total
0	0	0	2	2	0	0	4

=== April 5 event ===
List of confirmed tornadoes – Wednesday, April 5, 1972 (Note: All dates are based on the local time zone where the tornado touched down; however, all times are in Coordinated Universal Time and dates are split at midnight CST/CDT for consistency.) (Note: Prior to 1994, only the average widths of tornado paths were officially listed.)
F#	Location	County / Parish	State	Start coord.	Time (UTC)	Path length	Max. width	Summary
F3	Faloma, OR to Image, WA to SE of Mill Plain, WA	Multnomah (OR), Clark (WA)	OR, WA	45.60°N 122.63°W	20:30–21:00	8.7 miles (14.0 km)	400 yards (370 m)	6 deaths – See section on this tornado – 300 people were injured and losses totaled $25.25 million.
F2	Hartline	Grant	WA	47.70°N 119.10°W	00:30–?	0.1 miles (0.16 km)	10 yards (9.1 m)	A wind event/possible tornado was later confirmed to be a tornado along with large hail up to 2 inches (5.1 cm). Flowers and shrub leaves were shredded, paint surfaces were speckled and peeled, four granaries were destroyed, and many buildings were damaged. Losses from the tornado reached $25,000. Tornado expert Thomas P. Grazulis did not rate the tornado F2 or stronger.
F3	Creston	Lincoln	WA	47.75°N 118.52°W	01:30–?	3–4 miles (4.8–6.4 km)	83 yards (76 m)	A twin-funneled, strong tornado moved through the east side of Creston. A trailer was obliterated, critically injuring the woman inside, and another was moved 3 feet (0.91 m) off its foundation. Two barns and a chicken house were destroyed as well. Losses totaled $250,000. Grazulis rated the tornado as a "minimal F2".
F2	W of Kettle Falls	Stevens	WA	48.60°N 118.10°W	02:30–?	1 mile (1.6 km)	100 yards (91 m)	Trees were damaged in circular pattern near the mouth of the Colville River, including some that were uprooted. Losses totaled $25,000. Grazulis did not rate the tornado F2 or stronger.

=== Portland, Oregon/Vancouver, Washington ===
Portland, Oregon/Vancouver, Washington
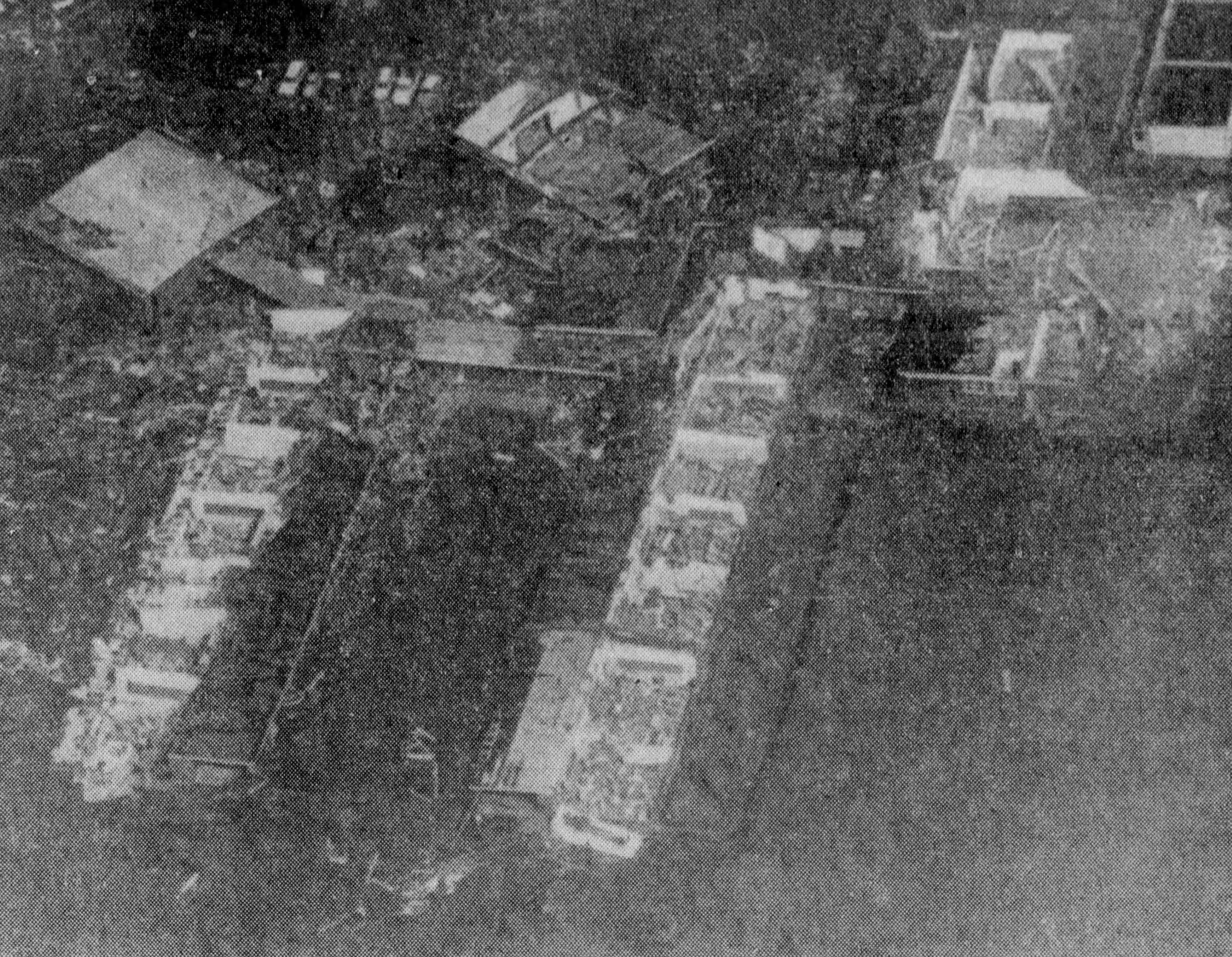
- A school in Vancouver after the tornado

Meteorological history
- Formed: April 5, 1972, 12:55 p.m. CDT (UTC−05:00)
- Dissipated: April 5, 1972, 1:05 p.m. CDT (UTC−05:00)
- Duration: 10 minutes

F3 tornado
- on the Fujita scale
- Highest winds: 165 mph (266 km/h)

Overall effects
- Casualties: 6 fatalities, 300 injuries
- Damage: $25.25 million

The National Weather Service tracked a very turbulent squall line of thunderstorms moving northeasterly across Portland, Oregon, the strongest of which was near the city of Tigard. The tornado formed from this storm and touched down near the edge of the Columbia River, moving 1 1/2 mi (2.4 km) before crossing the river. The tornado was difficult to observe because of the fog and the mud and flying debris drawn up by the tornado. After making landfall on the Washington side of the river, it continued its 9-mile (14 km) journey before dissipating. The storm was classed as a tornado by the National Weather Service on April 6. While officially rated F3, the tornado was assessed as F2 by tornado historian Thomas P. Grazulis, who noted that only some homes lost walls and "no F3 damage was evident".

In Portland, Oregon, the tornado damaged four boat moorings and 50 small boats. Damage in Oregon from the tornado totaled up to $250,000 (1972 USD). Vancouver, Washington, suffered the most significant damage from the tornado. The tornado struck east Vancouver at 12:51 p.m. (PST) on April 5, 1972, where it destroyed a grocery store, along with Peter S. Ogden Elementary School injuring 70 students. Nearby, the storm demolished a bowling alley and a drive-in theater screen, while damaging the roofs of around 100 homes, some severely. Trees and power lines were downed and several vehicles were flipped as well. The Oregon National Guard and the Oregon State Police crossed the state border to help transport the injured and direct traffic in the aftermath of the tornado.

== Non-tornadic events ==
High winds brought by the thunderstorms caused minimal tree damage. In Tigard, the thunderstorm that spawned the tornado tore the roof off a warehouse and damaged several parked cars. A pressure jump of 0.12 inches (3.0 mm) was recorded by the National Weather Service. The Portland, Oregon National Weather Service office, approximately one mile east of the tornado touchdown, recorded winds gusting up to 63 mph (101 km/h). Another weather station reported sustained winds of 80 mph (130 km/h).

== Aftermath ==
Overall, the Portland–Vancouver F3 tornado killed six people and left $25.25 million (1972 USD) in damage. The small outbreak was the deadliest and most significant tornado event to occur in the Pacific Northwest, with two F3 tornadoes.

== See also ==
- List of North American tornadoes and tornado outbreaks
- Tornado outbreak sequence of January 7–11, 2008 – An EF1 tornado struck the northern suburbs of Vancouver, Washington
