= Hurricane Agnes tornado outbreak =

1972 tornado outbreak in Florida

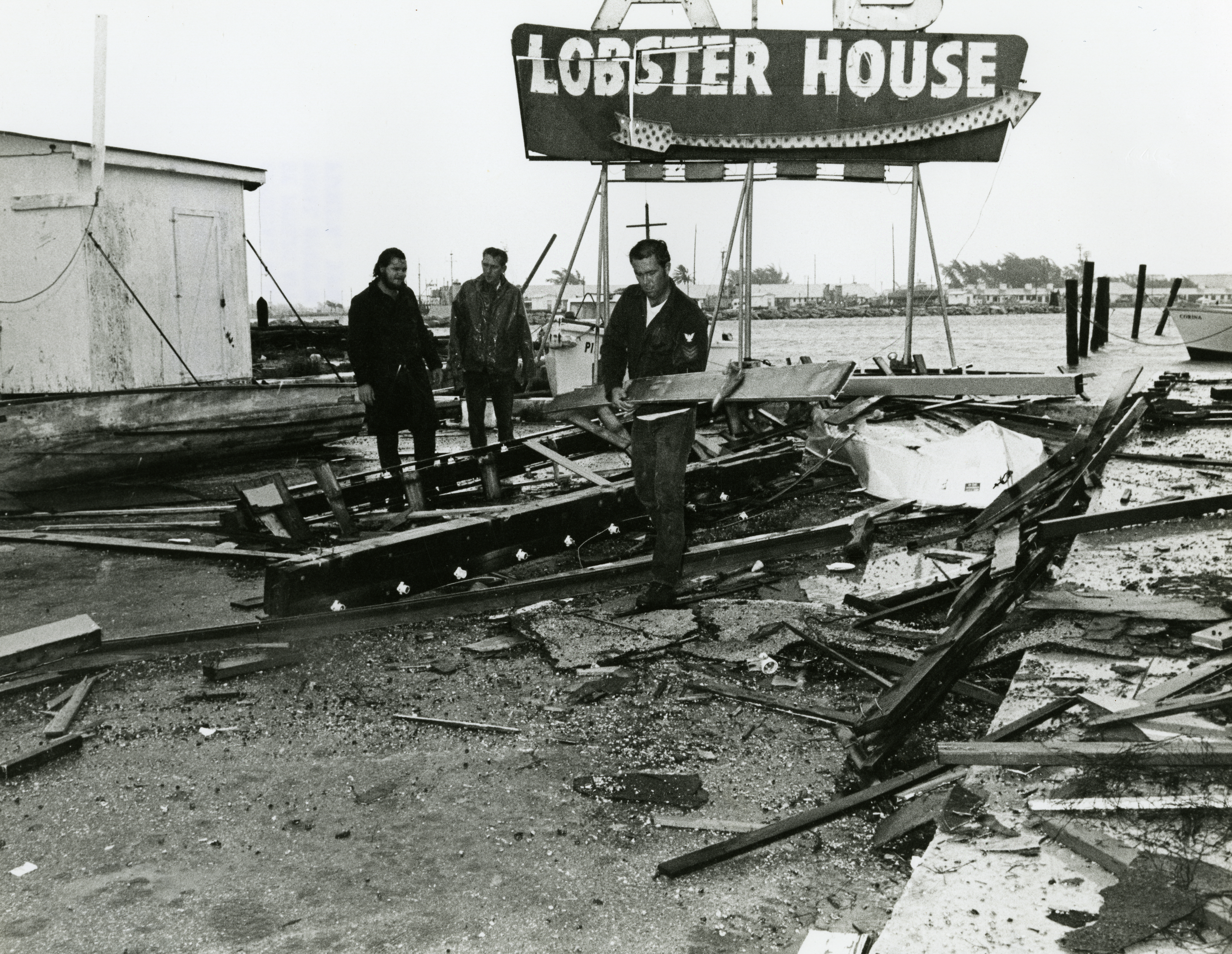
- Damage from an F2 tornado in Key West, Florida

Meteorological history
- Date: June 18–19, 1972

Tornado outbreak
- Tornadoes: 19 confirmed
- Max. rating: F3 tornado
- Duration: 1 day, 13 hours, 45 minutes

Overall effects
- Casualties: 7 fatalities, ≥135 injuries
- Damage: $5,570,030 (1972 USD) (Note: All losses are in 1972 USD unless otherwise noted.) $42.9 million (2025 USD)
- Areas affected: Florida and Georgia
- Part of the Tornadoes of 1972 and Hurricane Agnes

On June 18–19, 1972, Hurricane Agnes generated the third-deadliest tropical cyclone-related tornado outbreak in the United States since 1900, as well as the deadliest such tornado outbreak on record in Florida. The outbreak lasted about 38 hours and produced at least 19 confirmed tornadoes, though some studies suggested nearly a dozen more. Two of the tornadoes killed a total of seven people and were not classified as tornadoes by the National Weather Service until 2018. In Florida alone, the outbreak inflicted at least 135 injuries and destroyed 15 homes, while 119 homes received damage. Statewide, 217 trailers were destroyed and 196 trailers incurred damage. Additionally, six businesses were destroyed, while six others were damaged. (Note: An outbreak is generally defined as a group of at least six tornadoes with no more than a six-hour gap between individual tornadoes; however, the threshold varies slightly according to local climatology. On the Florida peninsula, an outbreak consists of at least four tornadoes occurring relatively synchronously—no more than four hours apart.) (Note: According to a reassessment in 2002, the outbreak resulted in thirty tornadoes in Florida and Georgia, including six F0 events, twelve F1 events, ten F2 events, and two F3 events on the Fujita scale. (Operationally, only seventeen tornadoes were confirmed.)) (Note: The Fujita scale was devised under the aegis of scientist T. Theodore Fujita in the early 1970s. Prior to the advent of the scale in 1971, tornadoes in the United States were officially unrated. While the Fujita scale has been superseded by the Enhanced Fujita scale in the U.S. since February 1, 2007, Canada used the old scale until April 1, 2013; nations elsewhere, like the United Kingdom, apply other classifications such as the TORRO scale.) (Note: Historically, the number of tornadoes globally and in the United States was and is likely underrepresented: research by Grazulis on annual tornado activity suggests that, as of 2001, only 53% of yearly U.S. tornadoes were officially recorded. Documentation of tornadoes outside the United States was historically less exhaustive, owing to the lack of monitors in many nations and, in some cases, to internal political controls on public information. Most countries only recorded tornadoes that produced severe damage or loss of life. Significant low biases in U.S. tornado counts likely occurred through the early 1990s, when advanced NEXRAD was first installed and the National Weather Service began comprehensively verifying tornado occurrences.)

== Background ==
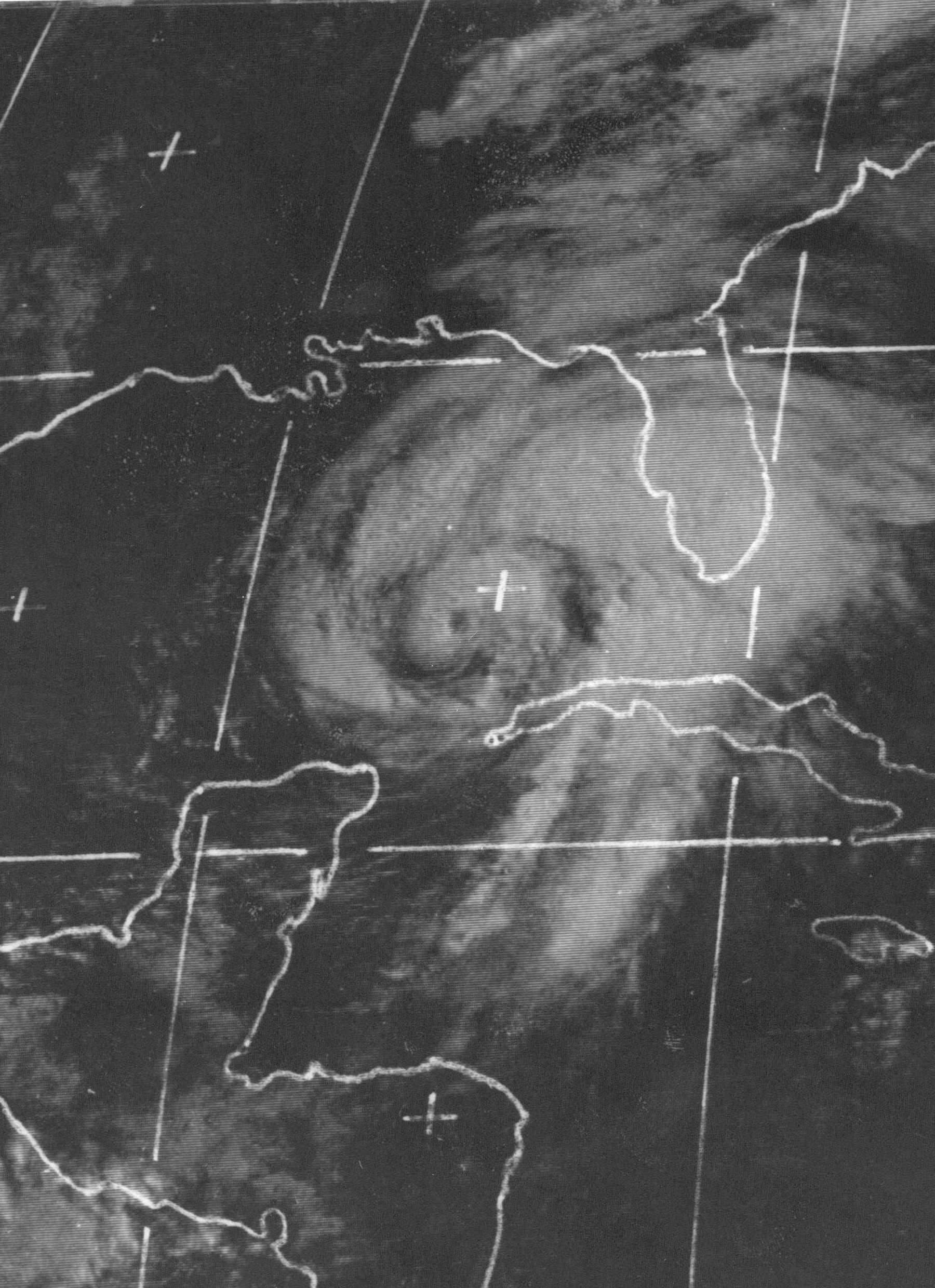
Satellite image of Hurricane Agnes at 13:00 UTC (9:00 a.m. EDT) on June 18, while the outbreak was in progress

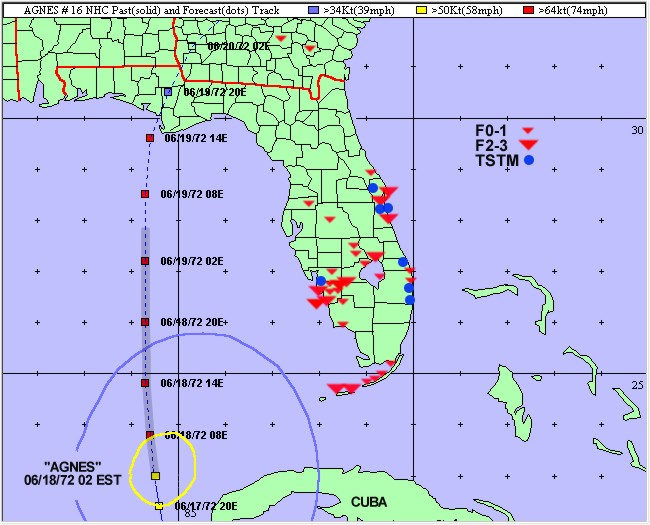
Reanalysis of the 1972 Hurricane Agnes tornado outbreak

The interaction of baroclinic features with Agnes resulted in a tropical cyclone with "hybrid" characteristics, which increased the threat of strong tornadoes with longer path lengths. The outbreak became the most significant tornado outbreak associated with a tropical cyclone prior to landfall. The presence of strong wind shear surrounding the tropical cyclone facilitated the development of strong tornadoes, including the greatest number of tornadoes of at least F2 intensity within one 24-hour period in Florida. Studies have suggested strong wind shear in the lower levels of the atmosphere is a common feature during tornado outbreaks involving the outer rain bands of tropical cyclones near Florida. Additionally, in Florida cases, the favored region for tornado outbreaks is the northeastern quadrant of northward-moving tropical cyclones. Agnes represented one of these cases.

== Daily statistics ==
Impacts by region
Region	Locale	County	Deaths	Injuries	Damages	Source
United States	Florida	Brevard	0	34	$3,580,000	
United States	Florida	Glades	0	6	$190,000	
United States	Florida	Hendry	1	1	$10,000	
United States	Florida	Highlands	0	0	$30	
United States	Florida	Lee	0	0	$125,000	
United States	Florida	Monroe	0	40	$752,000	
United States	Florida	Okeechobee	6	46	$525,000	
United States	Florida	Palm Beach	0	0	$10,000	
United States	Florida	Pasco	0	4	$20,000	
United States	Florida	Polk	0	3	$43,000	
United States	Florida	Volusia	0	0	$40,000	
United States	Georgia	Coffee	0	0	$250,000	
United States	Georgia	Pierce	0	1	$25,000	
Total			7	135	$5,570,030	

== Confirmed tornadoes ==
Confirmed tornadoes by Fujita rating
FU	F0	F1	F2	F3	F4	F5	Total
0	1	7	9	2	0	0	≥ 19
"FU" denotes unclassified but confirmed tornadoes.

- A number of undocumented tornadoes were located in 2002, but were overlooked at the time of the outbreak. Most of these remain unlisted in official records. For example, a brief tornado struck Everglades City. Trees were prostrated and portions of a home were transported for 1/4 mi (0.40 km). Additionally, a brief tornado damaged a roof and two airplanes in the town of Immokalee. Power lines were downed in the area.

=== June 18 event ===
Confirmed tornadoes – Sunday, June 18, 1972 (Note: All dates are based on the local time zone where the tornado touched down; however, all times are in Coordinated Universal Time and dates are split at midnight CST/CDT for consistency.) (Note: Prior to 1994, only the average widths of tornado paths were officially listed.)
F#	Location	County / Parish	State	Start coord.	Time (UTC)	Path length	Max. width	Summary
F2	Big Coppitt Key	Monroe	Florida	24.62°N 81.68°W	06:15–?	1 mile (1.6 km)	100 yards (91 m)	Tornado developed over Geiger Key, striking a trailer park. In all, 47–60 trailers and five homes incurred damage. One frame residence lost its roof. Losses totalled $342,000, and 40 people were injured.
F2	Northern Key West	Monroe	Florida	24.57°N 81.80°W	07:00–?	1.5 miles (2.4 km)	50 yards (46 m)	Buildings were destroyed and unroofed on the northern side of Key West. Losses amounted to $400,000.
F1	Conch Key	Monroe	Florida	24.83°N 80.88°W	10:00–?	2 miles (3.2 km)	20 yards (18 m)	The majority of the damage occurred on Conch Key, where the tornado damaged six trailers. Losses amounted to less than $10,000.
F1	NNE of Basinger	Okeechobee	Florida	27.43°N 81.00°W	17:55–?	1 mile (1.6 km)	50 yards (46 m)	This tornado first impacted U.S. Route 98 and damaged or destroyed six mobile homes. Two individuals received injuries, and damages totalled $20,000.
F2	WSW of Sanibel	Lee	Florida	26.43°N 82.12°W	18:38–?	0.3 miles (0.48 km)	30 yards (27 m)	Five stores and the roof of a church were destroyed. Losses reached $15,000. Grazulis did not list this tornado as an F2 or stronger.
F2	Pine Island	Lee	Florida	26.62°N 82.17°W	19:00–?	2 miles (3.2 km)	50 yards (46 m)	This tornado passed through three trailer parks and destroyed four mobile homes. Several stores received damage as well. Losses were near $50,000. Grazulis did not list this tornado as an F2 or stronger.
F1	NNE of Lake Alfred	Polk	Florida	28.13°N 81.70°W	19:10–?	0.3 miles (0.48 km)	50 yards (46 m)	This tornado struck the Haines City Mobile Home Park and severely damaged six mobile homes. Three minor injuries occurred, and damages reached $43,000.
F2	Lehigh Acres	Lee	Florida	26.62°N 81.63°W	20:00–?	0.5 miles (0.80 km)	20 yards (18 m)	A brief tornado struck and destroyed a television transmission tower. Damages were estimated at $60,000. Grazulis did not list this tornado as an F2 or stronger.
F2	S of Fort Denaud to WNW of LaBelle	Hendry, Glades	Florida	26.73°N 81.47°W	21:13–?	3.5 miles (5.6 km)	150 yards (140 m)	1 death – This strong tornado killed a woman as it wrecked her mobile home in Fort Denaud. It then damaged Citrus crops and destroyed 10 other mobile homes near LaBelle before dissipating. Losses totalled $200,000, and seven people were injured.
F1	NNW of Crystal Springs	Pasco	Florida	28.20°N 82.17°W	21:40–?	0.2 miles (0.32 km)	50 yards (46 m)	This brief tornado damaged a number of homes. Four people were injured, one seriously, and damages reached $20,000.
F1	E of Juno Ridge	Palm Beach	Florida	26.80°N 80.10°W	22:40–?	0.3 miles (0.48 km)	50 yards (46 m)	A short-lived tornado struck the Lost Tree Village Club in North Palm Beach, tossing a sailboat from a lake onto a roof. A home and tennis courts sustained damage as well. Losses reached $10,000. NCEI lists a touchdown west of Lake Park.
F0	E of Brighton	Highlands	Florida	27.22°N 80.97°W	22:45–?	1 mile (1.6 km)	20 yards (18 m)	A brief tornado produced minimal damage near the intersection of the Kissimmee River and State Road 70.
F2	Malabar	Brevard	Florida	28.00°N 80.57°W	23:46–?	2 miles (3.2 km)	100 yards (91 m)	A strong tornado affected the Century Oaks Trailer Park. In all, six mobile homes were destroyed, while nine others sustained damage. Homes were also damaged in Port Malabar. 11 people were injured, and estimated losses reached $100,000, primarily at the trailer park. Grazulis did not list this tornado as an F2 or stronger.
F2	Taylor Creek to NE of Cypress Quarters	Okeechobee	Florida	27.21°N 80.8°W	04:55–?	4.5 miles (7.2 km)	440 yards (400 m)	6 deaths – This strong tornado destroyed or extensively damaged 50 mobile homes. Losses totalled $500,000, and 44 people were injured.

=== June 19 event ===
Confirmed tornadoes – Monday, June 19, 1972
F#	Location	County / Parish	State	Start coord.	Time (UTC)	Path length	Max. width	Summary
F3	Merritt Island	Brevard	Florida	28.37°N 80.67°W	06:35–?	4.9 miles (7.9 km)	100 yards (91 m)	One apartment building was destroyed as the tornado struck a subdivision. Two hangars and 44 airplanes were destroyed at the Merritt Island Airport; one of the planes was carried more than 1/4 mi (0.40 km) from the airport and crashed into a home. Damages totalled $3 million. Grazulis classified this tornado as an F2.
F3	Cape Canaveral	Brevard	Florida	28.47°N 80.53°W	07:00–?	3.8 miles (6.1 km)	100 yards (91 m)	This intense tornado struck the town of Cape Canaveral. The tornado damaged or destroyed 22 homes and 30 mobile homes. The Coast Guard station at Port Canaveral reported a loss of $50,000. 100 residents were rendered homeless, and 23 people were injured. Overall losses exceeded $500,000.
F1	ENE of Geneva	Volusia	Florida	28.75°N 81.08°W	08:50–?	0.1 miles (0.16 km)	100 yards (91 m)	A brief tornado destroyed five mobile homes. Losses reached $40,000.
F1	SE of Homestead	Pierce	GA	31.25°N 82.25°W	18:55–?	1 mile (1.6 km)	50 yards (46 m)	A brief tornado tore a porch from a mobile home, damaged nearby structures, and felled trees. One person was injured south of Blackshear.
F2	NE of Bethel	Coffee	GA	31.48°N 82.87°W	20:00–?	2 miles (3.2 km)	50 yards (46 m)	This tornado damaged a marble plant, roofing, and residences. Many trees were splintered or downed as well. Grazulis did not list this tornado as an F2 or stronger.

== See also ==
- List of tornadoes and tornado outbreaks
  - List of North American tornadoes and tornado outbreaks
  - List of tropical cyclone-spawned tornadoes

== Sources ==
- Brooks, Harold E. (April 2004). "On the Relationship of Tornado Path Length and Width to Intensity". Weather and Forecasting. 19 (2). Boston: American Meteorological Society: 310–19. Bibcode:2004WtFor..19..310B. doi:10.1175/1520-0434(2004)019<0310:OTROTP>2.0.CO;2.
- Cook, A. R.; Schaefer, J. T. (August 2008). Written at Norman, Oklahoma. "The Relation of El Niño–Southern Oscillation (ENSO) to Winter Tornado Outbreaks". Monthly Weather Review. 136 (8). Boston: American Meteorological Society: 3135. Bibcode:2008MWRv..136.3121C. doi:10.1175/2007MWR2171.1.
- Grazulis, Thomas P. (July 1993). Significant Tornadoes 1680–1991: A Chronology and Analysis of Events. St. Johnsbury, Vermont: The Tornado Project of Environmental Films. ISBN 1-879362-03-1.
- Grazulis, Thomas P. (2001a). The Tornado: Nature's Ultimate Windstorm. Norman: University of Oklahoma Press. ISBN 978-0-8061-3538-0.
- Grazulis, Thomas P. (2001b). F5-F6 Tornadoes. St. Johnsbury, Vermont: The Tornado Project of Environmental Films.
- Hagemeyer, Bartlett C. (September 1997). "Peninsular Florida Tornado Outbreaks". Weather and Forecasting. 12 (3). Boston: American Meteorological Society: 400. Bibcode:1997WtFor..12..399H. doi:10.1175/1520-0434(1997)012<0399:PFTO>2.0.CO;2. S2CID 120588681.
- International Best Track Archive for Climate Stewardship (IBTrACS) (May 2021). IBTrACS browser (hosted by UNC Asheville) (Report). National Centers for Environmental Information – via World Data Center for Meteorology.
- National Weather Service (June 1972). Storm Data Publication (Report). National Centers for Environmental Information – via Storm Events Database.
- National Weather Service (June 1972). "Storm Data and Unusual Weather Phenomena". Storm Data. 6 (14). Asheville, North Carolina: National Climatic Data Center.
