= Mill Plain, Washington =

Unincorporated community in Clark County, Washington

- Neighborhood of Vancouver, Washington; Former census designated place
- Location of Mill Plain, Washington
- Coordinates: 45°38′38″N 122°29′25″W
- Country: United States
- State: Washington
- County: Clark

Area
  - Total: 6.0 sq mi (15.5 km^{2})
  - Land: 6.0 sq mi (15.5 km^{2})
  - Water: 0 sq mi (0.0 km^{2})
- Elevation: 240 ft (73 m)

Population (2000)
  - Total: 7,400
  - Density: 1,237/sq mi (477.6/km^{2})
- Time zone: UTC-8 (Pacific (PST))
  - Summer (DST): UTC-7 (PDT)
- FIPS code: 53-45915
- GNIS feature ID: 2408832

Mill Plain is an unincorporated area in Clark County, Washington, United States. At the 2000 census it was defined as a census-designated place (CDP) and had a population of 7,400. The area was not listed as a CDP for the 2010 census.

== Geography ==
The Mill Plain area is located in southern Clark County. The community bordered by the city of Vancouver to the west and south and by the city of Camas to the southeast.

According to the United States Census Bureau, in 2000 the CDP had a total area of 6.0 square miles (15.5 km^{2}), all of it land.

== Demographics ==
Mill Plain first appeared as a census designated place in the 2000 U.S. census. The CDP was annexed to the city of Vancouver, Washington prior to the 2010 U.S. census.

As of the census of 2000, there were 7,400 people, 2,379 households, and 1,953 families residing in the CDP. The population density was 1,236.9 inhabitants per square mile (477.6/km^{2}). There were 2,500 housing units at an average density of 417.9 per square mile (161.4/km^{2}). The racial makeup of the CDP was 87.34% White, 1.62% African American, 0.57% Native American, 6.23% Asian, 0.11% Pacific Islander, 0.59% from other races, and 3.54% from two or more races. Hispanic or Latino of any race were 2.66% of the population.

There were 2,379 households, out of which 49.7% had children under the age of 18 living with them, 71.0% were married couples living together, 7.7% had a female householder with no husband present, and 17.9% were non-families. 12.6% of all households were made up of individuals, and 3.5% had someone living alone who was 65 years of age or older. The average household size was 3.11 and the average family size was 3.41.

In the CDP the age distribution of the population shows 34.5% under the age of 18, 7.2% from 18 to 24, 35.3% from 25 to 44, 17.3% from 45 to 64, and 5.7% who were 65 years of age or older. The median age was 30 years. For every 100 females, there were 99.2 males. For every 100 females age 18 and over, there were 95.4 males.

The median income for a household in the CDP was $58,432, and the median income for a family was $59,386. Males had a median income of $45,385 versus $26,803 for females. The per capita income for the CDP was $21,181. About 7.6% of families and 10.3% of the population were below the poverty line, including 15.8% of those under age 18 and 8.1% of those age 65 or over.
