= Hartline, Washington =

Hartline
- Town
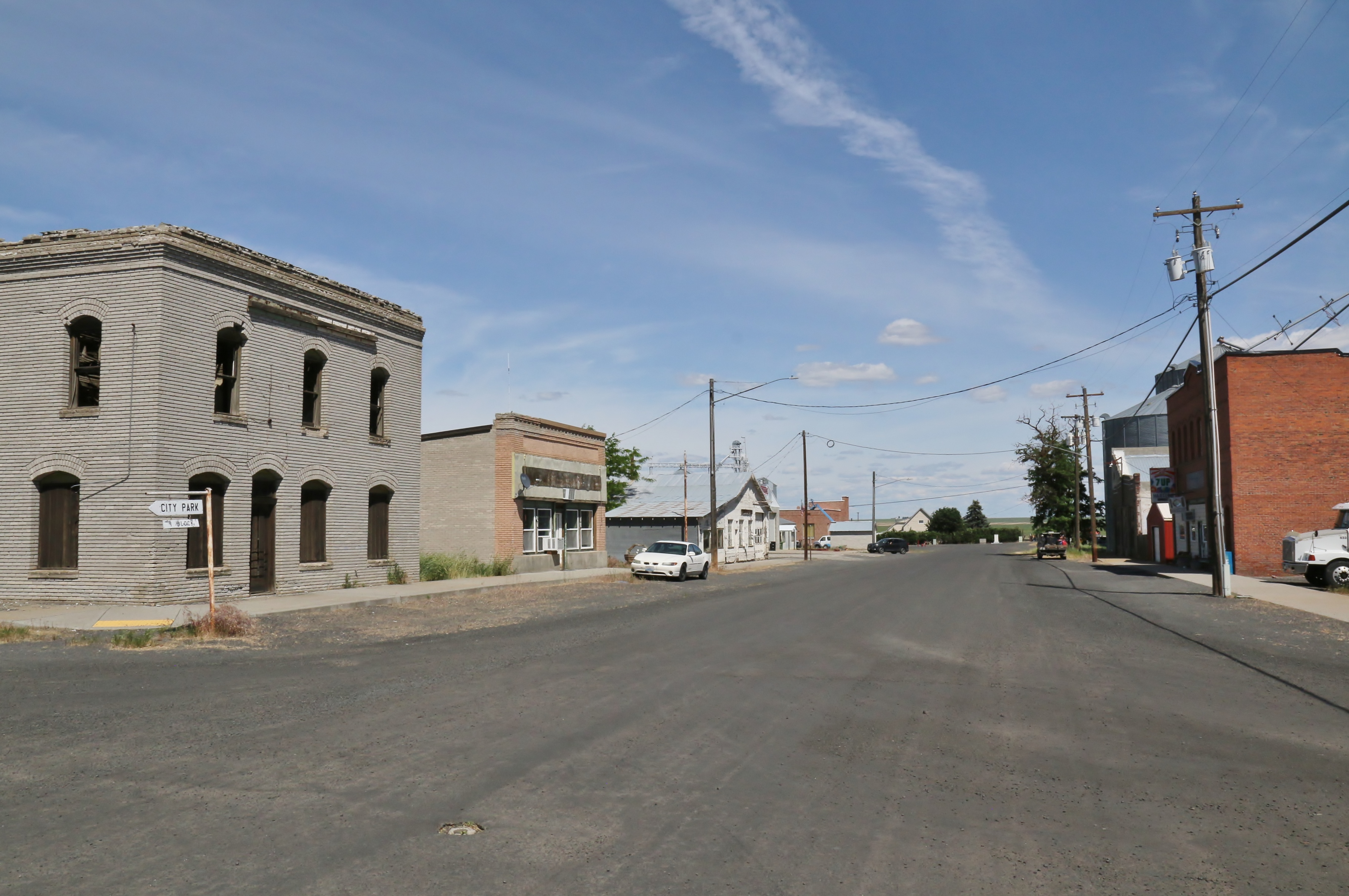
- Willard Street

- Location of Hartline, Washington
- Coordinates: 47°41′22″N 119°06′29″W
- Country: United States
- State: Washington
- County: Grant

Government
  - Type: Mayor Council
  - Mayor: Andrew Allsbrook

Area
  - Total: 0.34 sq mi (0.87 km^{2})
  - Land: 0.34 sq mi (0.87 km^{2})
  - Water: 0 sq mi (0.00 km^{2})
- Elevation: 1,910 ft (580 m)

Population (2020)
  - Total: 180
  - Density: 460.6/sq mi (177.85/km^{2})
- Time zone: UTC-8 (Pacific (PST))
  - Summer (DST): UTC-7 (PDT)
- ZIP code: 99135
- Area code: 509
- FIPS code: 53-29920
- GNIS feature ID: 2412729

Hartline is a town in Grant County, Washington, United States. The population was 180 at the 2020 census. The high school for the Almira-Coulee/Hartline school district was located here, but moved to Coulee City, Washington in 2008. The name "Hartline" is an Americanized spelling of the German last name "Hartlein" and is an uncommon last name.

== History ==
Hartline was named for early settler John Hartline. It was officially incorporated on March 6, 1907.

== Geography ==
According to the United States Census Bureau, the town has a total area of 0.33 square miles (0.85 km^{2}), all of it land.

=== Climate ===
According to the Köppen Climate Classification system, Hartline has a semi-arid climate, abbreviated "BSk" on climate maps.

Climate data for Hartline
| Month | Jan | Feb | Mar | Apr | May | Jun | Jul | Aug | Sep | Oct | Nov | Dec | Year |
|---|---|---|---|---|---|---|---|---|---|---|---|---|---|
| Record high °F (°C) | 52 (11) | 62 (17) | 73 (23) | 93 (34) | 100 (38) | 103 (39) | 110 (43) | 110 (43) | 101 (38) | 86 (30) | 67 (19) | 56 (13) | 110 (43) |
| Mean daily maximum °F (°C) | 31.8 (−0.1) | 39.1 (3.9) | 50.6 (10.3) | 61.4 (16.3) | 70.8 (21.6) | 78.6 (25.9) | 87.6 (30.9) | 86.2 (30.1) | 76.8 (24.9) | 61.6 (16.4) | 43.1 (6.2) | 33.8 (1.0) | 60.1 (15.6) |
| Mean daily minimum °F (°C) | 19.2 (−7.1) | 24.1 (−4.4) | 30.5 (−0.8) | 36.1 (2.3) | 42.8 (6.0) | 49.3 (9.6) | 55.4 (13.0) | 54.5 (12.5) | 47.1 (8.4) | 36.9 (2.7) | 28 (−2) | 21.9 (−5.6) | 37.2 (2.9) |
| Record low °F (°C) | −19 (−28) | −20 (−29) | 4 (−16) | 14 (−10) | 24 (−4) | 28 (−2) | 34 (1) | 31 (−1) | 26 (−3) | 4 (−16) | −8 (−22) | −19 (−28) | −20 (−29) |
| Average precipitation inches (mm) | 1.07 (27) | 0.91 (23) | 0.83 (21) | 0.71 (18) | 0.95 (24) | 0.92 (23) | 0.47 (12) | 0.4 (10) | 0.52 (13) | 0.74 (19) | 1.34 (34) | 1.43 (36) | 10.29 (261) |
| Average snowfall inches (cm) | 6.8 (17) | 3.2 (8.1) | 0.7 (1.8) | 0.1 (0.25) | 0 (0) | 0 (0) | 0 (0) | 0 (0) | 0 (0) | 0.2 (0.51) | 3 (7.6) | 8.4 (21) | 22.4 (57) |
| Average precipitation days | 6 | 5 | 5 | 4 | 5 | 5 | 3 | 2 | 3 | 4 | 7 | 8 | 57 |

== Demographics ==
Historical population
| Census | Pop. | Note | %± |
|---|---|---|---|
| 1910 | 237 | | — |
| 1920 | 282 | | 19.0% |
| 1930 | 170 | | −39.7% |
| 1940 | 168 | | −1.2% |
| 1950 | 205 | | 22.0% |
| 1960 | 206 | | 0.5% |
| 1970 | 189 | | −8.3% |
| 1980 | 165 | | −12.7% |
| 1990 | 176 | | 6.7% |
| 2000 | 134 | | −23.9% |
| 2010 | 151 | | 12.7% |
| 2020 | 180 | | 19.2% |
U.S. Decennial Census; 2020 Census

=== 2010 census ===
As of the 2010 census, there were 151 people, 62 households, and 37 families residing in the town. The population density was 457.6 inhabitants per square mile (176.7/km^{2}). There were 87 housing units at an average density of 263.6 per square mile (101.8/km^{2}). The racial makeup of the town was 90.7% White, 0.7% African American, 1.3% Asian, 4.6% from other races, and 2.6% from two or more races. Hispanic or Latino of any race were 11.9% of the population.

There were 62 households, of which 27.4% had children under the age of 18 living with them, 53.2% were married couples living together, 4.8% had a female householder with no husband present, 1.6% had a male householder with no wife present, and 40.3% were non-families. 33.9% of all households were made up of individuals, and 4.8% had someone living alone who was 65 years of age or older. The average household size was 2.44 and the average family size was 3.16.

The median age in the town was 41.8 years. 25.8% of residents were under the age of 18; 7.2% were between the ages of 18 and 24; 20.5% were from 25 to 44; 31.7% were from 45 to 64; and 14.6% were 65 years of age or older. The gender makeup of the town was 53.6% male and 46.4% female.

=== 2000 census ===
As of the 2000 census, there were 134 people, 60 households, and 36 families residing in the town. The population density was 406.6 people per square mile (156.8/km^{2}). There were 77 housing units at an average density of 233.6 per square mile (90.1/km^{2}). The racial makeup of the town was 93.28% White, 1.49% Native American, 2.24% from other races, and 2.99% from two or more races. Hispanic or Latino of any race were 2.24% of the population.

There were 60 households, out of which 26.7% had children under the age of 18 living with them, 51.7% were married couples living together, 6.7% had a female householder with no husband present, and 40.0% were non-families. 36.7% of all households were made up of individuals, and 21.7% had someone living alone who was 65 years of age or older. The average household size was 2.23 and the average family size was 2.78.

In the town, the age distribution of the population shows 22.4% under the age of 18, 4.5% from 18 to 24, 32.1% from 25 to 44, 20.1% from 45 to 64, and 20.9% who were 65 years of age or older. The median age was 41 years. For every 100 females, there were 109.4 males. For every 100 females age 18 and over, there were 112.2 males.

The median income for a household in the town was $27,917, and the median income for a family was $35,625. Males had a median income of $24,792 versus $26,250 for females. The per capita income for the town was $14,335. There were 5.7% of families and 8.5% of the population living below the poverty line, including no under eighteens and none of those over 64.

== Education ==
The town is served by the Coulee-Hartline School District.

== Notable people ==
- Dale Kinkade - Linguist who was a specialist in the Native American languages of the Pacific Northwest, was born and raised in Hartline.
