= Tornadoes of 1964 =

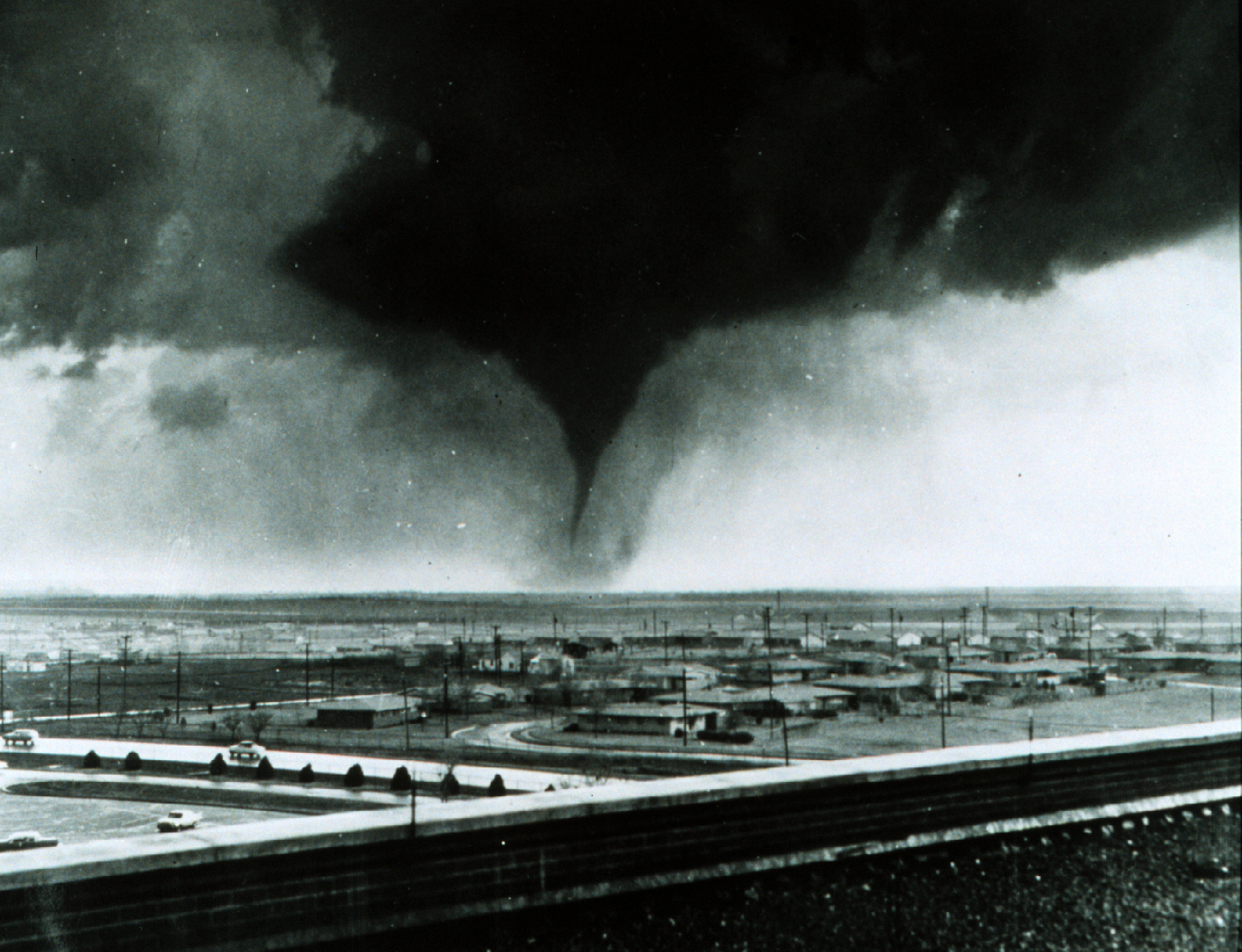
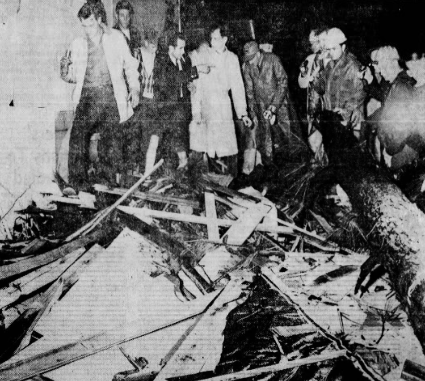
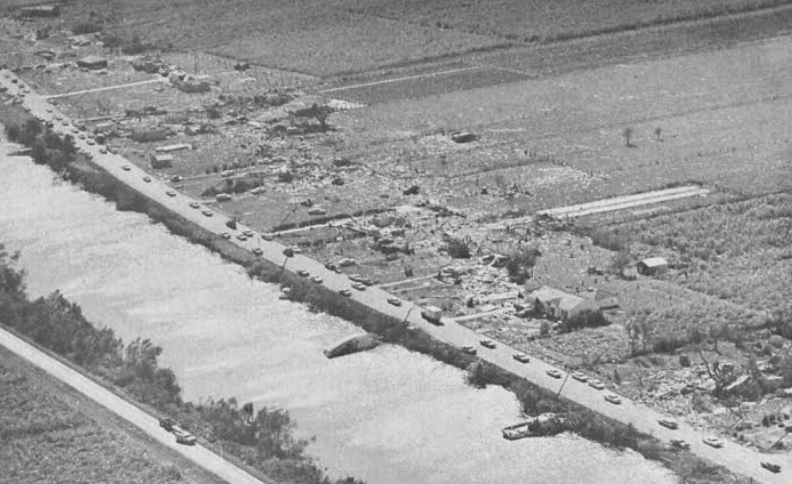
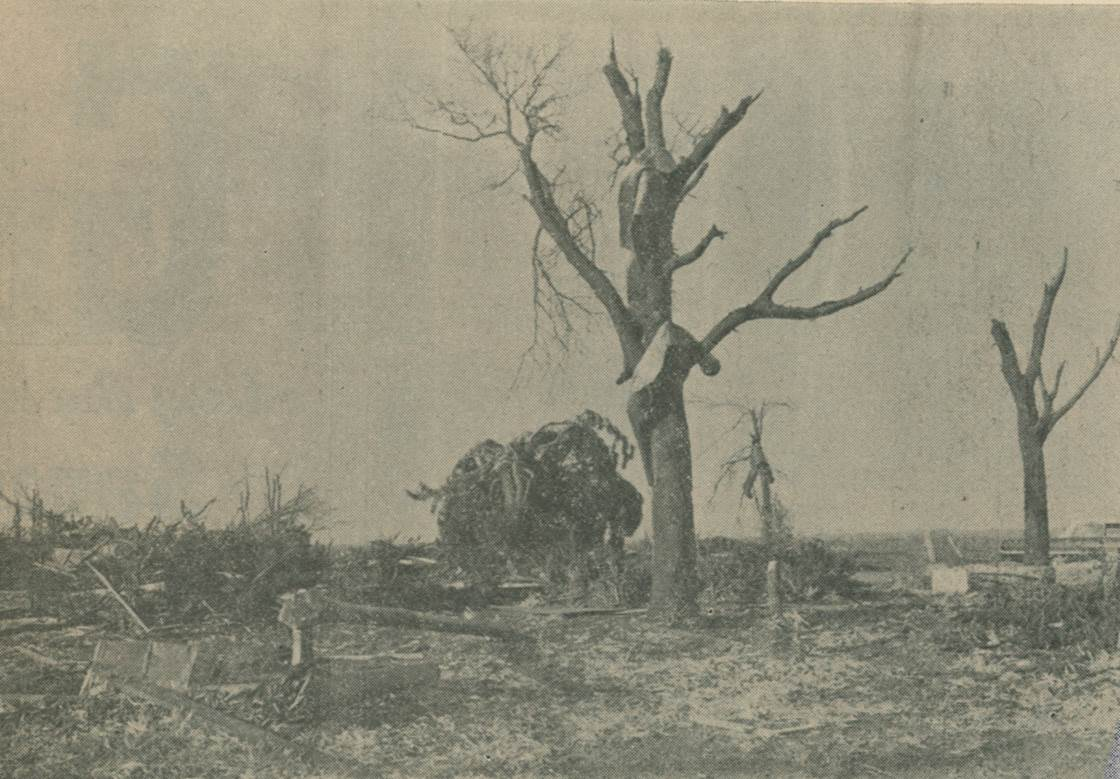
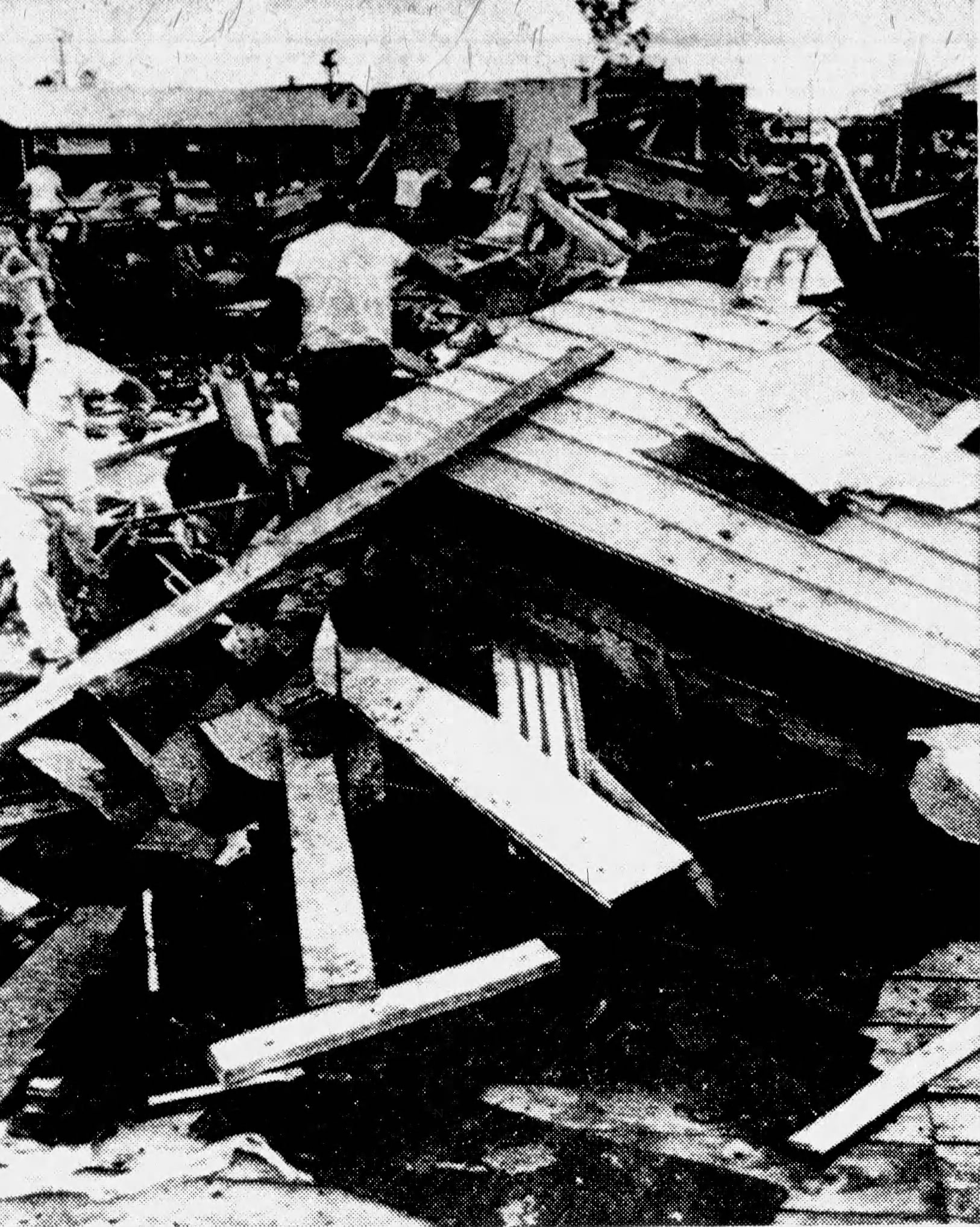
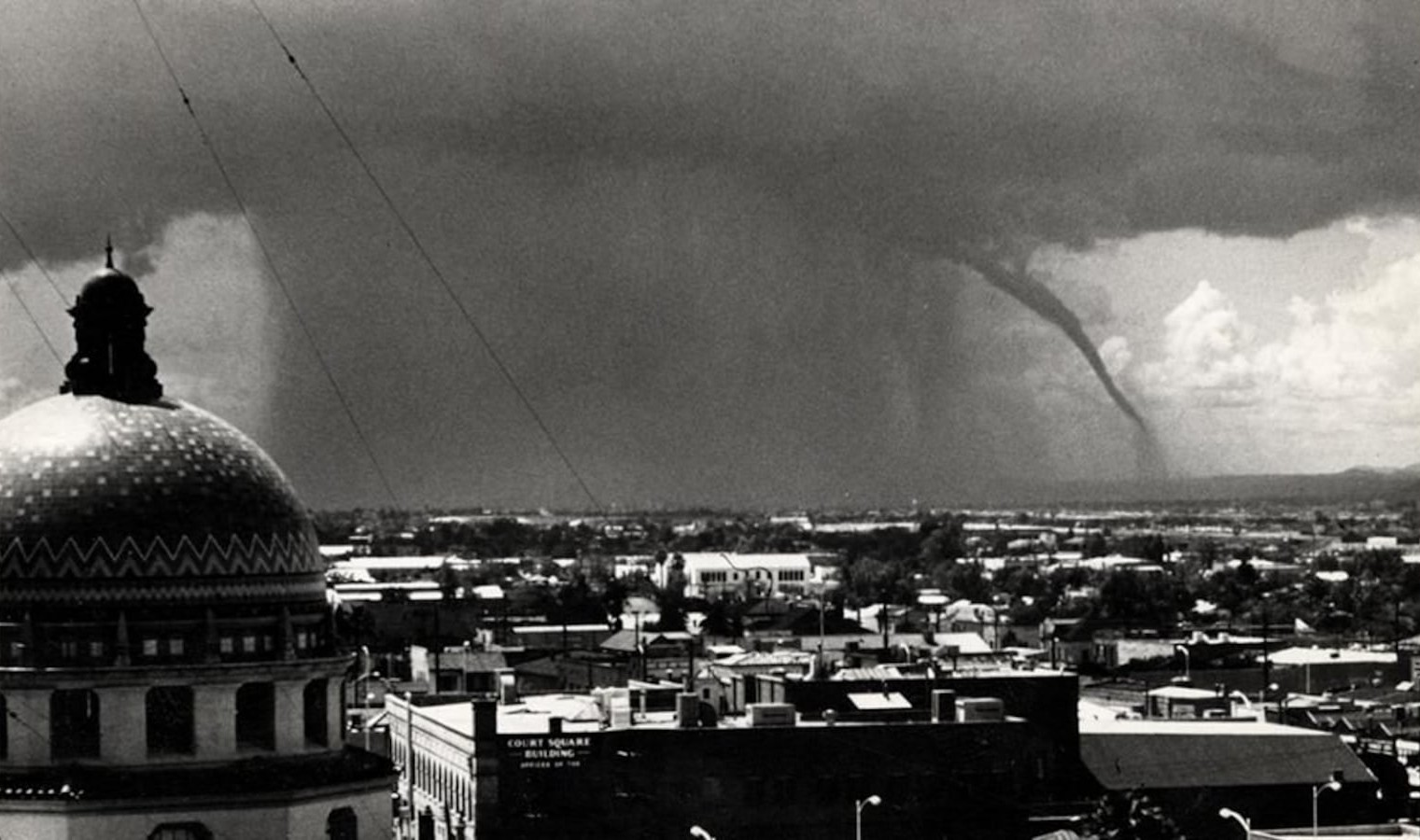
- Clockwise from top: An F5 tornado approaching Wichita Falls, Texas on April 3; An aerial photo of destroyed homes in Larose, Louisiana after an F4 tornado on October 3; The remains of a home in Port Washington, Wisconsin after an F4 tornado on August 22; A deadly F2 tornado that struck San Xavier Mission near Tucson, Arizona on August 27; Damage to a farmstead near Bradshaw, Nebraska after an F5 tornado on May 5; The remains of a home in Harpersville, Alabama after an F4 tornado on January 24.
- Timespan: January–December 1964
- Maximum rated tornado: F5 tornado: Wichita Falls, Texas on April 3; Bradshaw, Nebraska on May 5
- Tornadoes in U.S.: 704
- Damage (U.S.): $165.991 million (1964 USD)
- Fatalities (U.S.): 73
- Fatalities (worldwide): >73

This page documents the tornadoes and tornado outbreaks of 1964, primarily in the United States. Most tornadoes form in the U.S., although some events may take place internationally. Tornado statistics for older years like this often appear significantly lower than modern years due to fewer reports or confirmed tornadoes.

== Events ==
Fatal United States tornadoes in 1964
- Approximate touchdown location of killer tornadoes in 1964 Summary of tornadoes: January 24 – Alabama (10 deaths); March 4 – Arkansas (1 death); March 4 – Kentucky (3 deaths); March 9 – Alabama (2 deaths); April 3 – Texas (7 deaths); April 12 – Kansas, Missouri (1 death); April 12 – Kansas (3 deaths); April 12 – Iowa (1 death); April 12 – Missouri (1 death); April 12 – Missouri (1 death); April 17 – Texas (1 death); May 5 – Nebraska (4 deaths); May 8 – Michigan (11 deaths); May 29 – New Mexico (1 death); August 27 – Arizona (2 deaths); October 3 – Louisiana (22 deaths); December 25 – Georgia (2 deaths); Total fatalities: 73

=== United States yearly total ===
Confirmed tornadoes by Fujita rating
FU	F0	F1	F2	F3	F4	F5	Total
0	169	268	216	39	10	2	704

== January ==
There were 14 tornadoes confirmed in the US in January.

=== January 21 ===
A rare F0 tornado touched down in California.

=== January 24 ===
FU	F0	F1	F2	F3	F4	F5
0	2	4	2	0	1	0

An outbreak of nine tornadoes struck Arkansas, Kentucky, and Alabama, killing 10 and injuring 10. The strongest of these tornadoes, which was rated F4, swept multiple houses off of their foundations south of Harpersville, Alabama. This tornado was responsible for the 10 deaths that occurred during this outbreak.

== February ==
There were 2 tornadoes confirmed in the US in February.

== March ==
There were 36 tornadoes confirmed in the US in March.

=== March 4 ===
FU	F0	F1	F2	F3	F4	F5
0	0	1	3	3	1	0

A destructive outbreak of eight tornadoes pummeled the Mississippi and Tennessee Valleys, killing four and injuring 44.

=== March 8–10 ===
FU	F0	F1	F2	F3	F4	F5
0	0	6	1	2	0	0

An outbreak of nine tornadoes struck the Mississippi and Ohio Valleys, Southeast, and Northeast, killing two and injuring eight.

=== March 25–26 ===
FU	F0	F1	F2	F3	F4	F5
0	1	3	2	2	0	0

Just 17 days after the previous one, another outbreak of eight tornadoes hit the same general area, injuring 36.

== April ==
157 tornadoes were confirmed in the U.S. in April.

=== April 2–8 ===
FU	F0	F1	F2	F3	F4	F5
0	9	11	11	1	0	1

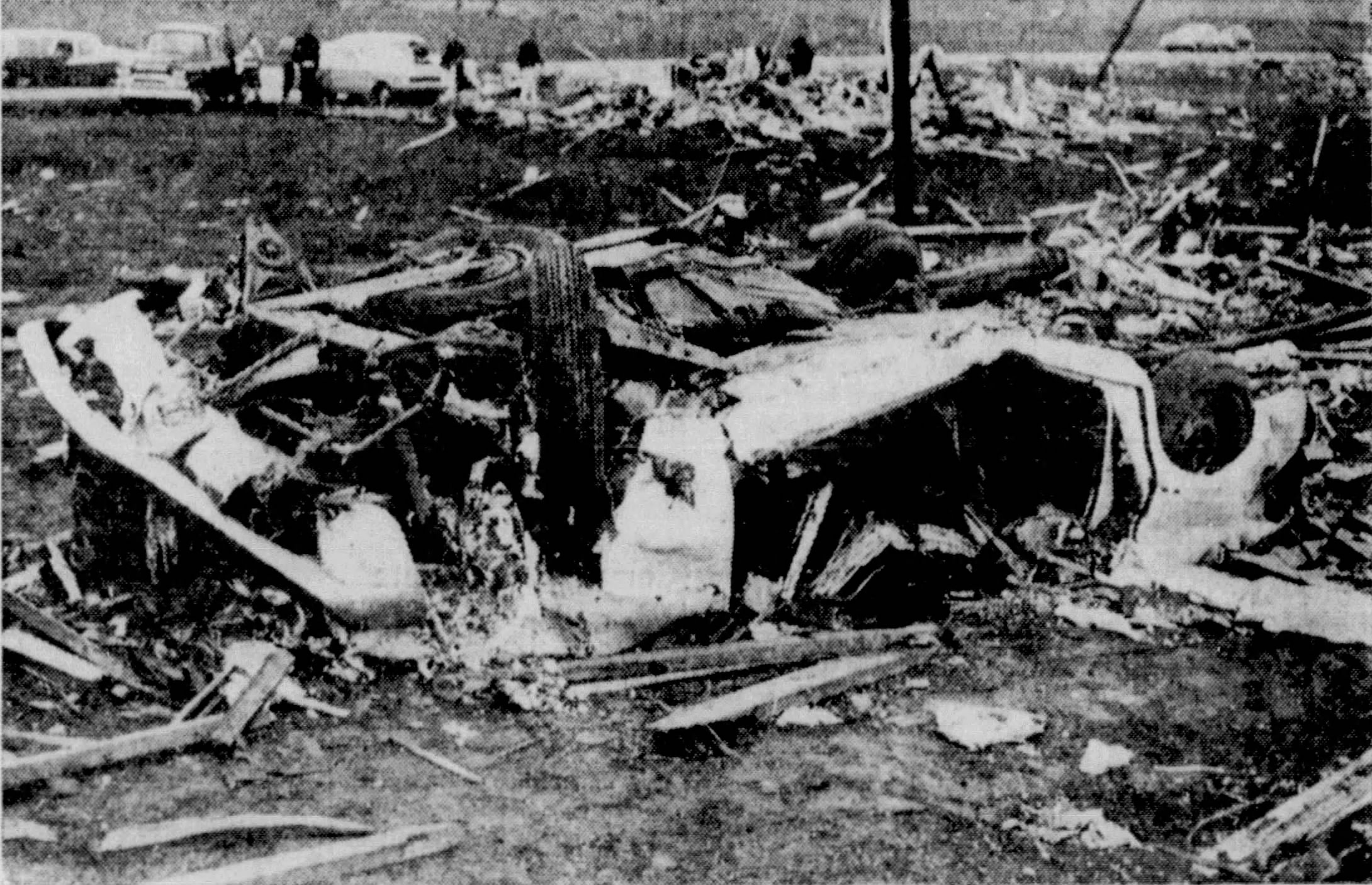
A vehicle that was mangled by an F5 tornado on April 3.

A tornado outbreak sequence spawned 33 tornadoes from the Great Plains to the Southeastern United States. The strongest and worst event was an F5 tornado that moved through Wichita Falls, Texas. It was the first tornado to ever be captured on live television. Seven people were killed and 111 others were injured. Overall, the outbreak killed seven people and injured 119. It would be the first of two violent tornadoes to hit Wichita Falls, with the other—an F4 tornado that killed 42—occurring on April 10, 1979.

=== April 12–14 ===
FU	F0	F1	F2	F3	F4	F5
0	1	11	6	3	2	0

Another large outbreak of 23 tornadoes struck the Midwest and Ozarks, killing seven and injuring 75.

=== April 17 ===
A squall line moving through Harris County, Texas spawned a tornado that killed one person and injured two more when a trailer home was blown over near Aldine. The squall line also generated high winds that damaged several hundred homes and buildings and knocking down trees and power poles in the northern and eastern parts of the county. Winds of 92 mph were measured at the Shell Oil refinery in Deer Park. The 81-foot wide tornado was on the ground for 22 miles and lifted near Deer Park. The tornado was rated as an F2, although Grazulis classified it as F1.

== May ==
134 tornadoes were confirmed in the U.S. in May.

=== May 4–8 ===
FU	F0	F1	F2	F3	F4	F5
0	8	20	35	7	2	1

A massive tornado outbreak sequence spawned 73 tornadoes from Texas to Michigan. On May 5, the second F5 tornado of the year carved a 79.7 mile path through Adams, Clay, Hamilton, York, Polk, and Antelope Counties in Nebraska, killing four people and injuring 50 others. On May 8, an F4 tornado struck suburban areas of metropolitan Detroit in Macomb County, Michigan, before continuing into Lambton County in Ontario, killing 11 people and injuring 224 others. In all, along with the 15 fatalities, 383 others were injured.

=== May 29–30 ===
FU	F0	F1	F2	F3	F4	F5
0	8	1	0	1	0	0

An F3 tornado killed one and injured eight in New Mexico, the first tornado to officially cause fatalities in the state. Nine other weak tornadoes also touched down in Wyoming, Texas, and Wisconsin with no casualties.

== June ==
There were 137 tornadoes confirmed in the US in June.

=== June 15 ===
FU	F0	F1	F2	F3	F4	F5
0	0	2	8	0	0	0

An outbreak of 10 tornadoes of hit the Midwest, Ohio Valley, and Northeast, injuring 18.

=== June 17–23 ===
FU	F0	F1	F2	F3	F4	F5
0	11	23	12	5	1	0

A large outbreak sequence of 52 tornadoes struck the Great Plains, Midwest, Ohio Valley, and Southeast, injuring 37.

== July ==
There were 63 tornadoes confirmed in the US in July.

== August ==
There were 79 tornadoes confirmed in the US in August.

=== August 18 ===
A rare F0 tornado touched down in Washington.

=== August 22 ===
FU	F0	F1	F2	F3	F4	F5
0	1	6	5	1	1	0

A violent outbreak of 14 tornadoes hit the Great Lakes region, injuring 38.

=== August 24–31 (Elsewhere) ===
FU	F0	F1	F2	F3	F4	F5
0	5	8	9	1	1	0

As Hurricane Cleo approached and hit the Southeast, 26 other tornadoes touched down in an unrelated outbreak sequence that struck the Great Plains, Southwest, and Midwest. On August 27, an F2 tornado struck the San Xavier Mission Village, Arizona west of Tucson in Pima County, destroying four homes, killing two people, and injuring nine others. This was the first official killer tornado ever recorded in Arizona, as well as the deadliest in ever recorded the state. On August 29, a localized, but destructive outbreak of six tornadoes hit Iowa and North Dakota with a 100 yard wide F4 tornado injuring two as it traveled 15.8 miles through Kossuth County, Iowa. Overall, the outbreak sequence killed two and injured 12.

=== August 27–31 (Hurricane Cleo) ===
FU	F0	F1	F2	F3	F4	F5
0	1	7	3	1	0	0

Hurricane Cleo fueled an outbreak of 12 tornadoes as it moved through the Southeast United States. The strongest tornado was a 50 yard wide F3 tornado that tore a 21.9 mile path through Scotland and Richmond County, North Carolina, injuring 15. A total of 21 people were injured from the tornadoes.

== September ==
There were 25 tornadoes confirmed in the US in September.

=== September 3 ===
FU	F0	F1	F2	F3	F4	F5
0	0	2	2	1	0	0

A small, but damaging outbreak of five tornadoes impacted Iowa, Wisconsin, and Michigan with a large, 800 yard wide F3 tornado injuring four in Richland County, Wisconsin.

=== September 12–13 (Hurricane Dora) ===
FU	F0	F1	F2	F3	F4	F5
0	1	2	0	0	0	0

Hurricane Dora spawned three weak tornadoes in the Carolinas as it moved through the Southeast.

== October ==
There were 22 tornadoes confirmed in the U.S. in October.

=== October 3–4 (Hurricane Hilda) ===
FU	F0	F1	F2	F3	F4	F5
0	0	4	7	0	1	0

A deadly and damaging outbreak of 12 tornadoes struck Louisiana, Mississippi, Alabama, and North Carolina due to the passage of Hurricane Hilda. In Louisiana, at least six tornadoes and two waterspouts were reported. A violent F4 tornado near Larose killed 22 people, injured 165 others, and destroyed 35 homes, despite being on the ground for only 1–1.5 mi (1.6–2.4 km). Automobiles in the path of the twister were also damaged. Debris picked up by the tornado was found 16 mi (26 km) away in Grand Coteau, Louisiana. It is only one of two violent tornadoes ever spawned by a hurricane with the other coming in 1961. No other tornado in the state resulted in deaths, though multiple twisters in the New Orleans metropolitan area caused extensive damage to several automobiles and buildings, knocked down power lines, which created localized power, and injured five people. In Mississippi, an F2 tornado struck areas in Pearl River County, destroying a home, two barns, and a pumping station. In Alabama, at least three tornadoes occurred across six counties, with one injuring two people after damaging five homes, a hospital, and a plant. Several more tornadoes were reported in six counties of North Carolina, with two F2 tornadoes being confirmed. In all, 22 people were killed and 172 others were injured.

=== October 14 (Hurricane Isbell) ===
FU	F0	F1	F2	F3	F4	F5
0	0	5	4	0	0	0

An outbreak of nine tornadoes occurred as Hurricane Isbell moved from southwest to northeast across South Florida. 48 people were injured.

== November ==
There were 17 tornadoes confirmed in the US in November.

=== November 1 ===
A rare F1 tornado touched down in California.

== December ==
There were 18 tornadoes confirmed in the US in December.

=== December 24–26 ===
FU	F0	F1	F2	F3	F4	F5
0	3	3	5	3	0	0

An outbreak of 14 tornadoes struck the Southeast during the Christmas holiday, killing two and injuring 28.

== See also ==
- Tornado
  - Tornadoes by year
  - Tornado records
  - Tornado climatology
  - Tornado myths
- List of tornado outbreaks
  - List of F5 and EF5 tornadoes
  - List of North American tornadoes and tornado outbreaks
  - List of 21st-century Canadian tornadoes and tornado outbreaks
  - List of European tornadoes and tornado outbreaks
  - List of tornadoes and tornado outbreaks in Asia
  - List of Southern Hemisphere tornadoes and tornado outbreaks
  - List of tornadoes striking downtown areas
  - List of tornadoes with confirmed satellite tornadoes
- Tornado intensity
  - Fujita scale
  - Enhanced Fujita scale
