= Bradshaw Town Hall =

- U.S. National Register of Historic Places
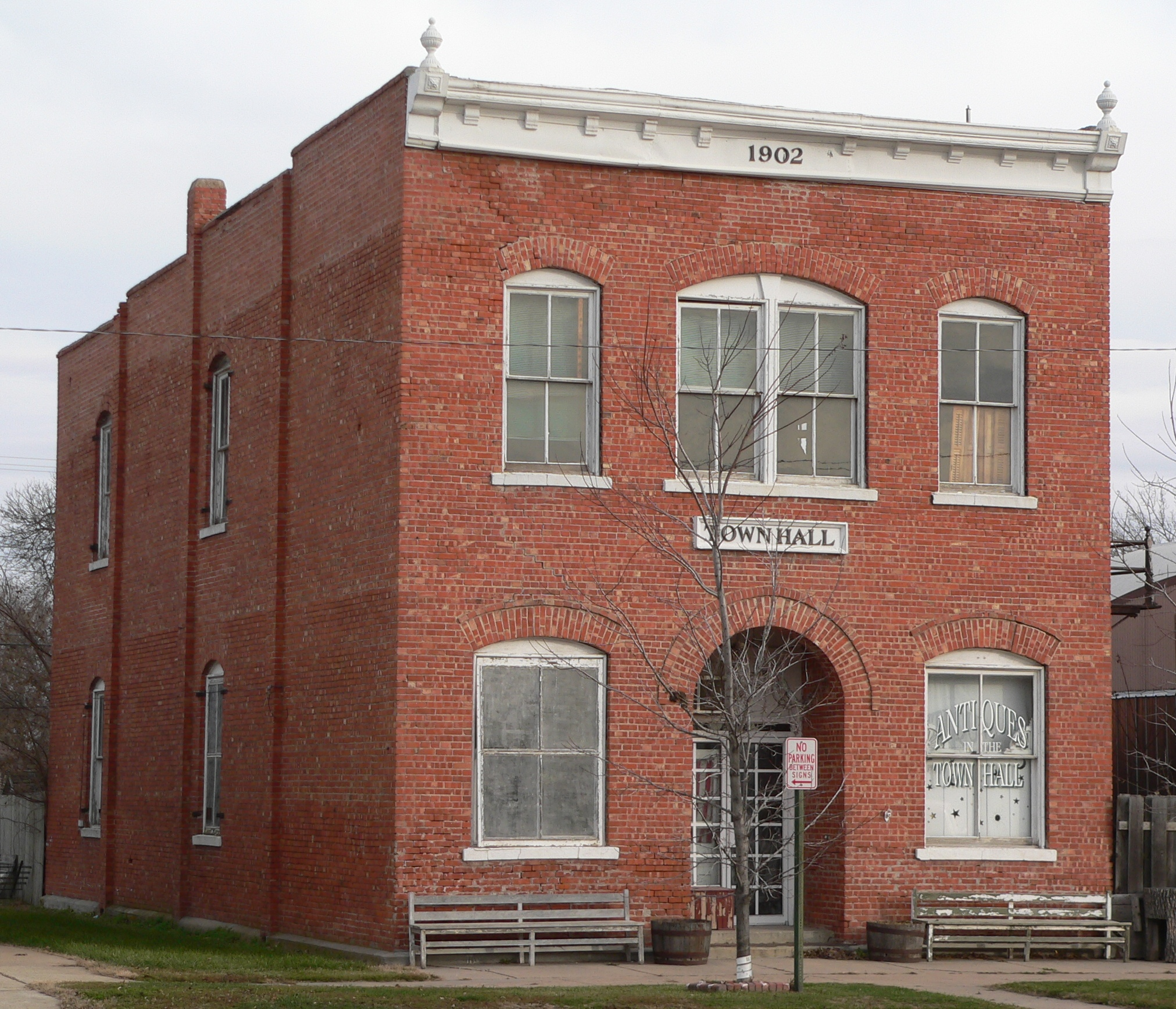
- The building in 2009

- Location within Nebraska Location within the United States
- Location: Off US 34, Bradshaw, Nebraska
- Coordinates: 40°53′01″N 97°44′48″W
- Area: less than one acre
- Built: 1902
- NRHP reference No.: 84002499
- Added to NRHP: May 31, 1984

The Bradshaw Town Hall, also known as the Bradshaw Civic Center, is a historic building in Bradshaw, Nebraska. It was built in 1902-1903 to house town hall meetings on the first floor and Freemason conclaves on the second floor. It was later repurposed as a community center. It has been listed on the National Register of Historic Places since May 31, 1984.
