= 1964 Harpersville tornado =

1964 tornado in Alabama, U.S.

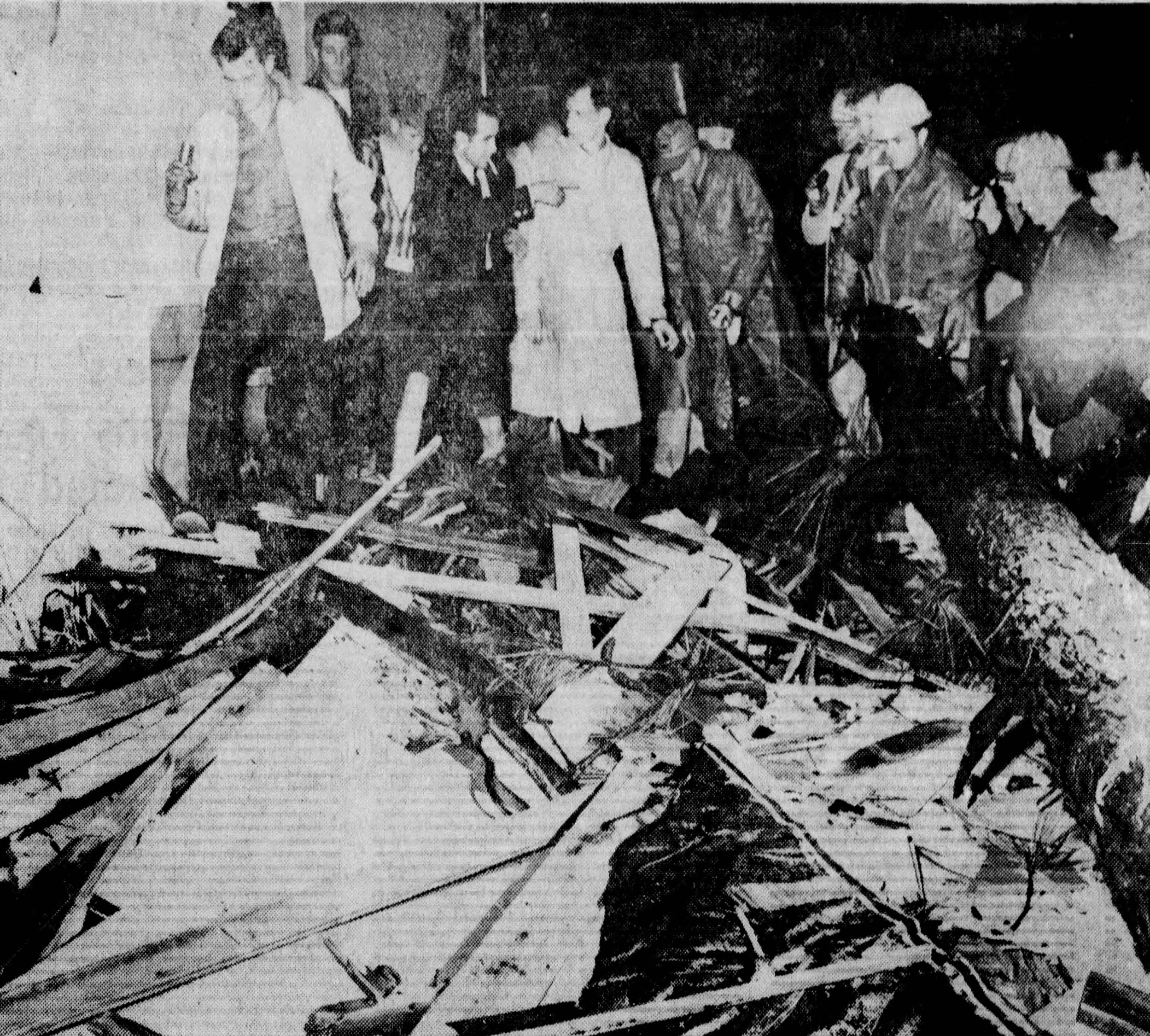
- A destroyed residence near Harpersville

Meteorological history
- Date: January 24, 1964

F4 tornado
- on the Fujita scale
- Max width: 100 yd (0.057 mi; 0.091 km)

Overall effects
- Fatalities: 10
- Injuries: 6
- Areas affected: Shelby County, Alabama
- Part of the Tornadoes of 1964

In the afternoon hours of January 24, 1964, a small but highly-deadly and powerful tornado moved near Harpersville, a town located in the U.S. state of Alabama. The tornado killed 10 people and injured six others along a 3.3-mile (5.3 km) path that spanned 100 yards (91 m) in width.

== Tornado summary ==
The tornado first touched down approximately 1 mile (1.6 km) to the southwest of Harpersville, tracking to the northeast. On County Road 25 a barn was destroyed, with the pieces being found in a grove 0.25 miles (0.40 km) away. It entered Harpersville from the southwest; in town, three homes were destroyed, 12 suffered "major" damage, and 20 suffered minor damage. Multiple trailers and farmhouses were additionally destroyed in the area. At the Garden of Memories Cemetery, most gravestones were destroyed. All 10 fatalities from the tornado were caused in three demolished homes along U.S. Route 280. Additionally, power lines in town were downed and damaged. It lifted after being on the ground for 3.3 miles (5.3 km), with a maximum width of 100 yards (91 m).

Rescue efforts immediately following the tornado were delayed by both significant power line damage and heavy rainfal that flooded streets; Civil defense authorities brought in power generators to provide light during initial rescue efforts. Communication with the town was cut at around 7:00 p.m., (Note: For consistency, all times in the article are in Central Daylight Time.) shortly after the tornado had moved through the area.

List of fatalities attributed to the tornado
Name	Age	Ref.
Kathy Brewer	N/A	
Ed Kelley	N/A	
Virginia Kelley	N/A	
Essie Mae Kelley	N/A	
Cheryl Kelley	8	
Betty McCall	N/A	
Mike McCall	N/A	
Kathy Brewer	N/A	
Stella Thomas	15	

== See also ==
- 1973 Central Alabama tornado, an F4 tornado that passed near Harpersville nine years later
