= 1964 Chesterfield Township tornado =

Weather event in Michigan, United States

- An aerial photograph of the Point Lakeview neighborhood in Chesterfield Township after the tornado.

Meteorological history
- Formed: May 8, 1964, 4:59 p.m. EDT (UTC−04:00)
- Dissipated: May 8, 1964, 5:05 p.m. EDT (UTC−04:00)
- Duration: 6 minutes

F4 tornado
- on the Fujita scale
- Max width: 833 yards (0.47 mi; 0.76 km)
- Path length: 3.3 miles (5.3 km)
- Highest winds: 207–260 mph (333–418 km/h)

Overall effects
- Fatalities: 11–13 Fatality estimates: 11 - Per NCEI and U.S. Department of Commerce; 13 - Per The Macomb Daily and Chesterfield Historical Society
- Injuries: 224
- Damage: $2.5 million (1964 USD) $26.93 million (2026 USD)
- Areas affected: Macomb County, Michigan; primarily the community of Chesterfield Township
- Part of the Tornadoes of 1964

During the afternoon hours of May 8, 1964, a short lived but violent and deadly tornado moved through Chesterfield Township, located in Macomb County in the U.S. state of Michigan. The tornado was part of an outbreak sequence lasting from May 4 to May 8, which affected the Great Plains, Midwest, and Great Lake regions. The tornado claimed the lives of 11 to 13 people, and injured a further 224 over its 3.3 mile long path along the shore of Anchor Bay. The tornado damaged or destroyed over 200 homes were damaged by the tornado with 132 being destroyed.

The tornado touched down in a housing area in southeastern Chesterfield Township, causing significant damage to several homes along Cotton Road and Sugarbush Road, before becoming violent and destroying homes in the Anchor Bay Harbor neighborhood as it moved along the Salt River. The tornado maintained intensity as it struck the neighborhood of Point Lakeview and the Lottie Schmidt subdivision, where it destroyed homes and threw vehicles before moving out over Anchor Bay.

The tornado was later officially rated as F4 on the Fujita scale, and is often referred to as the Anchor Bay tornado.

== Meteorological synopsis ==
A weather forecast map for May 8, 1964.

=== Forecast and Surface Conditions ===
The forecast on May 8 called for showers and thunderstorms in the Ohio Valley, Great Lakes, and portions of the Great Plains regions. Temperatures in the Port Huron area were expected to reach up to 75°F (23.8°C). Winds were moving from the southwest at between 15 and 35 mph and were forecasted to shift more to the east by May 9. A stationary front was in place over Wisconsin and northern Michigan, with a high pressure system over Florida.

=== Event Narrative ===
Several tornadoes touched down across the Great Plains and Midwest on May 8, primarily in the states of Iowa and Wisconsin.

Shortly after 4 pm EDT, the U.S. Weather Bureau in Detroit issued a tornado warning for areas including Pontiac and Chesterfield Township, which would remain in affect until 10 pm EDT.

The parent storm produced a short-lived tornado in Pontiac at 4:33 pm EDT. The tornado damaged 6 homes, tore a wall off a factory, and uprooted several trees. In total the Pontiac tornado caused $25 thousand (1964 USD) in damages and injured one person before lifting. The parent storm killed one person in Pontiac after their house burned down due to a lightning strike.

== Tornado Summary ==
F4-level damage in the Anchor Bay Harbor neighborhood.

=== Capehart Housing & Anchor Bay Harbor ===
At 4:59 pm EDT, the tornado touched down in the Capehart housing area of Chesterfield Township near Cotton Road and Graham Drive, where the tornado demolished several homes as it rapidly intensified. The tornado then completely demolished a half-mile stretch of homes along Cotton Road and Sugarbush Road, where several people were injured and one person was killed. A red coat belonging to a resident here was picked up by the tornado and was later found more than 30 miles away in Sombra, Ontario.

The tornado continued over open land before reaching F4 intensity as it struck the Anchor Bay Harbor neighborhood. Four people were killed when homes were completely destroyed with the debris being granulated down to the size of matchsticks. Homes along Jefferson Avenue were swept clean off their foundations as vehicles and furniture were thrown significant distances and mangled into trees. One of these homes was of cement block construction, and was left as a "battered shell". Large trees were uprooted and thrown considerable distances, and cabin cruiser boats along the lakeside that were anchored in canals were thrown far distances in the air, often landing on trees.

=== Point Lakeview & Lottie Schmidt subdivision ===
Destroyed homes in the Lottie Schmidt subdivision.

The tornado crossed a portion of Anchor Bay, before returning to land on a peninsula, striking the Point Lakeview neighborhood (Often referred to as Anchor Point or Anchor Bay). The tornado maintained F4 intensity as homes were reduced to their foundations and vehicles were mangled. Several small boats on the Salt River were thrown out of the river, and a bicycle was found wrapped around a tree. Two people were killed in the Point Lakeview neighborhood and least 10 homes were damaged or destroyed as the tornado continued east.

The tornado then struck the Lottie Schmidt subdivision, where homes were further destroyed and a 50-foot cruiser was picked up and thrown a considerable distance. Six people were killed in the subdivision, four of them from one family on Schneider Road. The tornado then rapidly weakened before lifting shortly after moving out over Anchor Bay. The tornado tracked for an estimated 3.3 miles (5.3 kilometers).

== Aftermath ==
List of fatalities directly attributed to the tornado

- James Anthony Rivard, 79 yrs (Capehart Housing)
- Barbra Forten, 29 yrs (Anchor Bay Harbor)
- Wendy Lou Soloc, 11 mos (Anchor Bay Harbor)
- Susan Ann Westfall, 7 yrs (Anchor Bay Harbor)
- Anthony A. Lesher, 10 yrs (Point Lakeview)
- Louis Winter, 92 yrs (Point Lakeview)
- Gladys Sparwasser, 68 yrs (Lottie Schmidt subdivision)
- Joseph Giroux, 72 yrs (Lottie Schmidt subdivision)
- Wanda Jo Sancrant, 25 yrs (Lottie Schmidt subdivision)
- Nanette Sancrant, 8 yrs (Lottie Schmidt subdivision)
- Tina Marie Sancrant, 20 mos (Lottie Schmidt subdivision)
- David Joseph Sancrant, 4 mos (Lottie Schmidt subdivision)

The tornado completely destroyed 132 homes, with an additional 69 with major damage, and 167 with minor damage. 224-244 people were injured with 88 of them being hospitalized. The tornado claimed the lives of 11 to 13 people (Note: Official data from the National Centers for Environmental Information and National Weather Service list a death toll of 11 people, while the Chesterfield Historical Society and The Macomb Daily list a death toll of 13), 6 of which were children. Despite a tornado warning be issued 20 minutes prior to the tornado, due to the high water table in the Chesterfield Township area, almost all of the homes destroyed lacked basements, which prevented many residents from being able to seek substantial shelter.

U.S. Air Force personnel in Chesterfield Township less than an hour after the tornado assisting rescuers.

Rescue workers rushed into Chesterfield Township, bringing tracking dogs to search the ruins of homes to search for survivors and bodies. Governor George W. Romney arrived in Chesterfield Township later that day, and declared the region a disaster zone, describing the disaster as "horrible". Romney also declared that no one was to return to the disaster area until 9 am EDT on May 9. President Lyndon Johnson expressed "great concern" over the loss of life and property due to the tornado. By 7 am on May 9, over 300 members of the National Guard moved into the disaster area, and volunteers had taken in all of the homeless. By 9 am EDT, police barricades had been set up, and Romney ordered all outsiders were to be kept away from the disaster area to prevent looting. Despite this, one man reported that his diamond ring that was worth $1,500 (1964 USD) had been stolen. The American Red Cross provided $31,313 (1964 USD) of aid within the month of May for the disaster victims. With an additional $16,754 (1964 USD) of aid approved by May 30.

A memorial was placed near Sugarbush road by the Chesterfield Historical Society, which lists the names of all 13 fatalities.

== See Also ==
- List of Michigan tornadoes
- Tornadoes of 1964
- 2026 Union City tornado – A similarly short-tracked but violent and deadly tornado that struck the state of Michigan in 2026
