= 1964 Central Nebraska tornado =

1964 F5 tornado in Nebraska

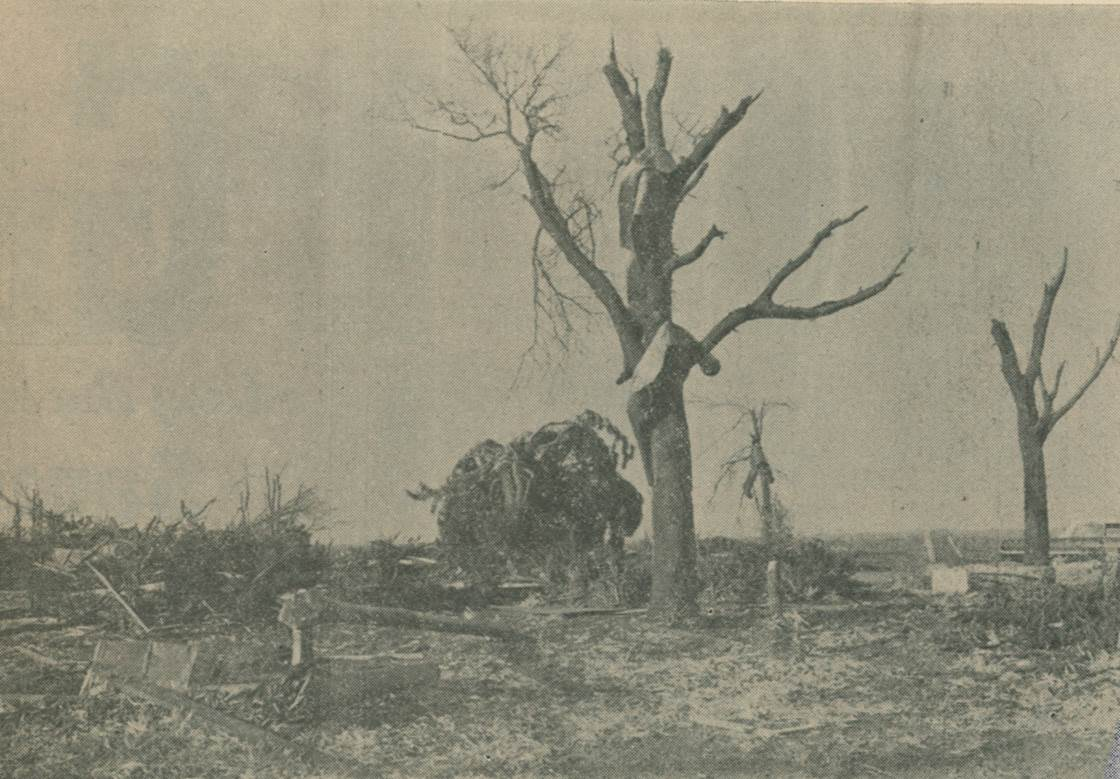
- Extreme damage at the home of Mr. and Mrs. Walter Troester from the tornado

Meteorological history
- Formed: May 5, 1964

F5 tornado
- on the Fujita scale
- Highest winds: >261 mph (420 km/h)

Overall effects
- Fatalities: 4
- Injuries: 50
- Damage: >$3 million (1964 USD) (Hamilton County only)
- Areas affected: Adams, Clay, Hamilton, York, Polk, and Butler Counties, Nebraska
- Part of the tornado outbreaks of 1964

On May 5, 1964, a violent and long-tracked tornado, most commonly known as the Bradshaw tornado, struck Adams, Clay, Hamilton, York, Polk, and Butler Counties in Nebraska. The damage in the village of Bradshaw was extreme enough that the National Weather Service assigned a Fujita scale rating of F5 to the tornado.

== Tornado summary ==
The tornado touched down near Hastings, Nebraska and traveled 70 miles (110 km) as it passed through or near Harvard, Giltner, Hampton, Bradshaw, Benedict, Stromsburg, Shelby, and Rising City before it finally lifted near Bellwood. The United States Weather Bureau documented that every structure in the path of the tornado was completely destroyed. A farm three miles (4.8 km) northwest of Bradshaw was obliterated at F5 intensity, and two people were killed. Fifteen people were injured in Shelby, which was barely spared from a direct strike. The National Weather Service in Hastings documented that at least a dozen farms were leveled in the first 30 miles (48 km) of the tornado's track. The tornado had a width of 0.25 miles (0.40 km) for most of its life. At times, two to three individual damaging funnels were visible from the same cloud, during which the width of the tornado increased to 0.75 miles (1.21 km). The U.S. Weather Bureau documented that severe hail occurred during the times when more than one funnel was visible. In the original damage survey from the U.S. Weather Bureau, and later the National Weather Service office in Hastings, it is documented that the tornado skipped (lifted and then touched back down again) several times for an additional 40 miles (64 km) after Bellwood, for a final path length of 110 miles (180 km). It was documented that this tornado caused between $5-50 million (1964 USD). While the United States Weather Bureau documented four deaths from this tornado, modern publications from the National Weather Service only indicate two deaths.

In total, the tornado killed four people, injured 50 others, and destroyed numerous buildings on 42 farms along its 70–110-mile (110–180 km) path. The exact damage total from the tornado is unknown; it was reported that $3 million (1964 USD) in damage occurred just in Hamilton County, Nebraska.

== See also ==
- Tornadoes of 1964
- List of F5 and EF5 tornadoes
