= 1964 Wichita Falls tornado =

Destructive F5 tornado in 1964

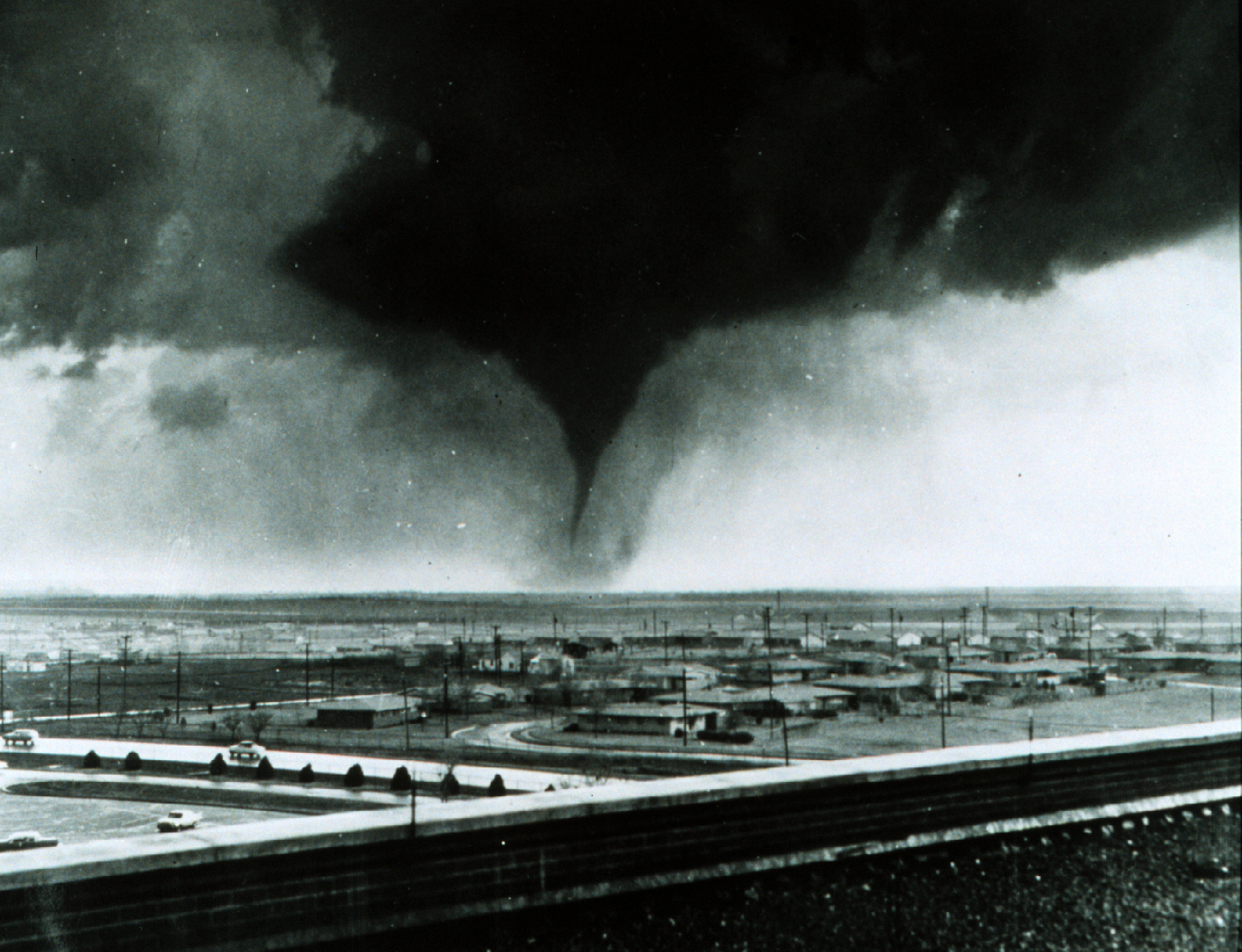
- The tornado seen as a rope.

Meteorological history
- Formed: April 3, 1964, 3:45 p.m. CDT (UTC–05:00)
- Dissipated: April 3, 1964, 5:40 p.m. CDT (UTC–05:00)
- Duration: 1 hour, 55 minutes

F5 tornado
- on the Fujita scale
- Highest winds: >261 mph (420 km/h)

Overall effects
- Fatalities: 7
- Injuries: 111
- Areas affected: Wichita Falls, Texas and Sheppard Air Force Base
- Part of the Tornadoes of 1964

During the afternoon through the evening hours of April 3, 1964, a violent tornado struck the city of Wichita Falls, located in northern Texas. The tornado killed 7 and injured a further 111, and causing an estimated $15 million in damages. The tornado heavily damaged downtown Wichita Falls and destroyed much of Sheppard Air Force Base.

The tornado was the first tornado that was broadcast to the public via live cameras, and is the highest-rated tornado to ever hit Wichita Falls.

== Tornado summary ==
The tornado first touched down at around 3:45 p.m, at an intersection that connects Farm Road 369 and the Seymour Highway. It began to track northeastward, crossing U.S. Highway 287 and entering into the Sunset Terrace subdivision of Wichita Falls. It tracked briefly through the area before crossing the Red River Expressway into the Lincoln Heights Subdivision. It ran almost parallel to 14th Street, causing damage to buildings located on adjacent roads. It then crossed Travis Street before tracking through Kell Boulevard, causing an unknown amount of damage.

The tornado caused heavy damage to the area near or adjacent to Lincoln Park, before tracking through Duncan Street and River Road. After causing damage in the Lincoln Park area, the tornado curved slightly to the left, aligning with Horton Lane. It began to track through relatively unpopulated areas, before crossing FM 1470 and narrowly missing Old Friburg Church Road. It then curved leftward, tracking through East McKinley Drive and Armstrong Drive before hitting the tarmac at Sheppard Air Force Base.

The tornado continued moving left, grazing the Tennis Court subdivision and tracking through Avenue K. It then curved sharply rightward, tracking directly back at the Air Force Base's northern portions. It then tracked through the 3 other runways located at the Base, causing an estimated $10 million (1964 USD) in damages. The tornado then hit Emmert Road and Napier Road before dissipating near the outskirts of Cashion Community. In all, the tornado tracked 5.6 miles at a maximum width of ~500 yards.

== Aftermath ==
=== Damage ===
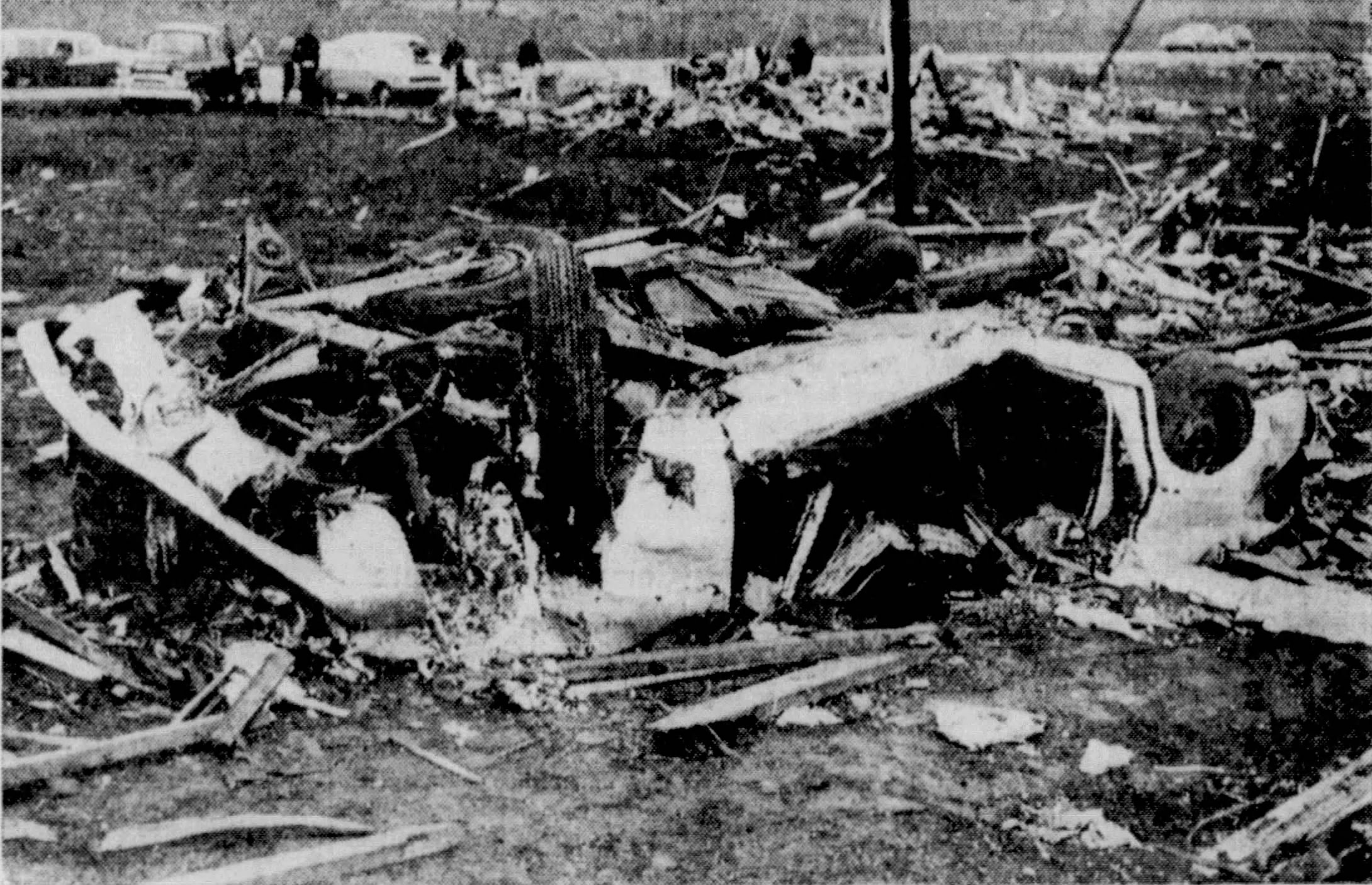
A mangled vehicle after the tornado.

The tornado caused extensive damage to portions of Wichita Falls. 225 homes were destroyed, largely in the Lincoln Heights subdivision, and 50 homes suffered major damage to varying degrees. 200 homes were inflicted with minor damage, and 16 other non-residential buildings received major damage or were completely destroyed. Sheppard Air Force Base was heavily damaged, with debris strewn on all four runways, rendering them unusable. Other buildings near or adjacent to the base were either damaged or destroyed, and losses at Sheppard Air Force Base totaled ~$15 million (1964 USD). ~10 million in losses were recorded in downtown Wichita Falls, giving the tornado a cost estimate of around ~$15 million (1964 USD). The sole area of F5 damage was to a pair of well built adjacent homes that were swept away at peak intensity.

=== Fatalities ===
Seven people in total were killed by the tornado. Six people in 5 different houses died when the Lincoln Heights subdivision took a direct hit, and one person was killed when the vehicle that they were driving in was thrown.

== See also ==
- Lubbock tornado
