= Bradshaw, Nebraska =

Village in York County, Nebraska, United States

- Village
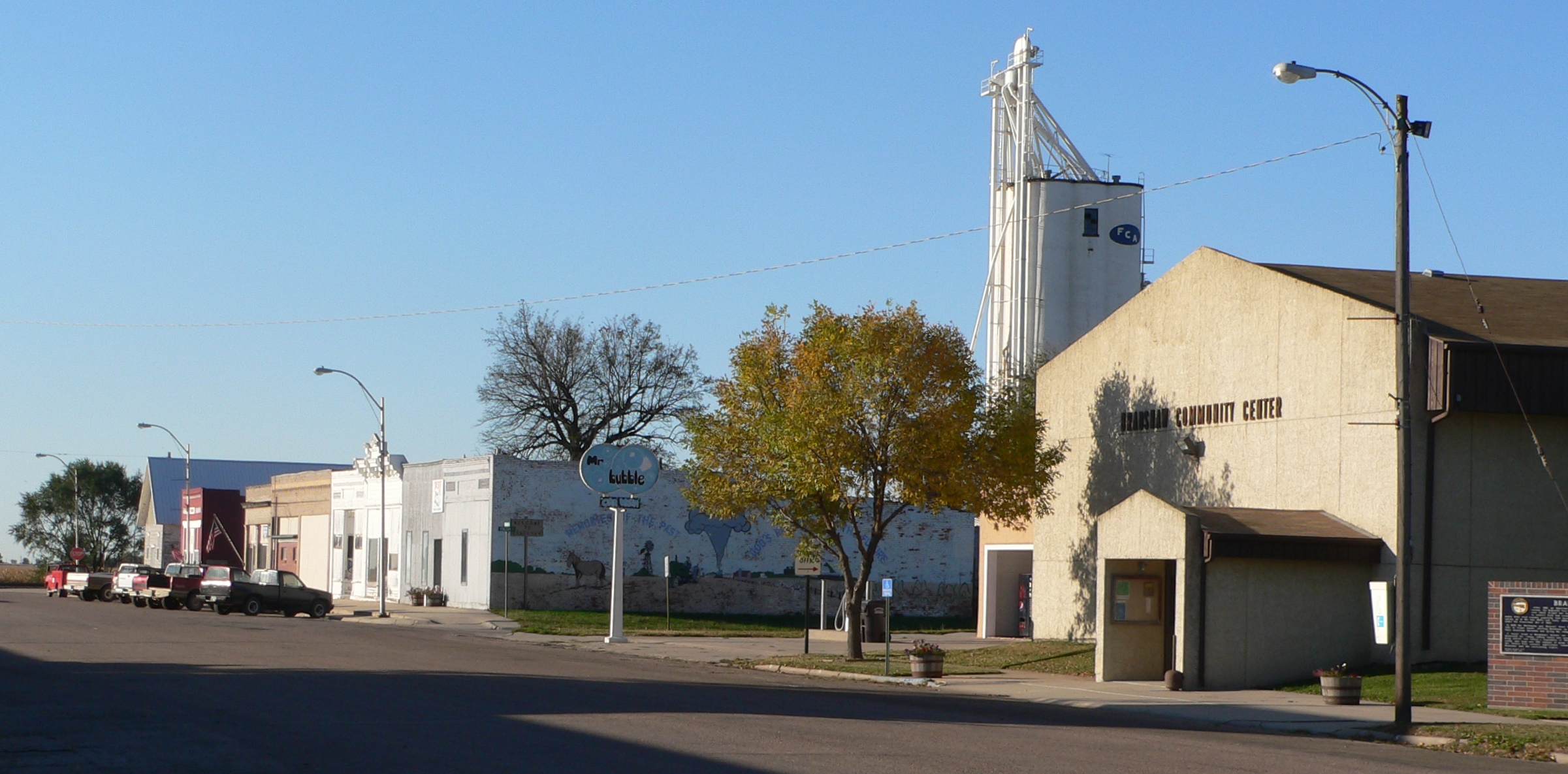
- Downtown Bradshaw, October 2011

- Location of Bradshaw, Nebraska
- Coordinates: 40°53′01″N 97°44′49″W
- Country: United States
- State: Nebraska
- County: York

Area
  - Total: 0.31 sq mi (0.81 km^{2})
  - Land: 0.31 sq mi (0.81 km^{2})
  - Water: 0 sq mi (0.00 km^{2})
- Elevation: 1,719 ft (524 m)

Population (2020)
  - Total: 273
  - Density: 868.8/sq mi (335.43/km^{2})
- Time zone: UTC-6 (Central (CST))
  - Summer (DST): UTC-5 (CDT)
- ZIP code: 68319
- Area code: 402
- FIPS code: 31-06050
- GNIS feature ID: 2398166
- Website: bradshawne.com

Bradshaw is a village in York County, Nebraska, United States. As of the 2020 census, Bradshaw had a population of 273.

== History ==
Bradshaw was platted in 1879 when the Burlington and Missouri River Railroad was extended to that point. Bradshaw was the maiden name of the wife of the original owner of the town site.

In 1890, a tornado struck Bradshaw, killing twelve people and doing great damage.

On May 5, 1964, an F5 tornado hit Bradshaw, killing 4 people and injuring 50. It was the only official F5 tornado in Nebraska history.

== Geography ==
According to the United States Census Bureau, the village has a total area of 0.33 square miles (0.85 km^{2}), all land.

=== Climate ===
Climate data for Bradshaw, Nebraska (coordinates:40.8836°N 97.7492°W, 1991-2020)
Month	Jan	Feb	Mar	Apr	May	Jun	Jul	Aug	Sep	Oct	Nov	Dec	Year
Average precipitation inches (mm)	0.62 (16)	0.68 (17)	1.29 (33)	2.69 (68)	4.81 (122)	3.92 (100)	3.64 (92)	3.56 (90)	2.26 (57)	2.25 (57)	1.24 (31)	0.97 (25)	27.93 (708)
Average snowfall inches (cm)	6.6 (17)	7.1 (18)	3.6 (9.1)	1.7 (4.3)	0.0 (0.0)	0.0 (0.0)	0.0 (0.0)	0.0 (0.0)	0.0 (0.0)	1.1 (2.8)	2.4 (6.1)	5.6 (14)	28.1 (71.3)
Average precipitation days (≥ 0.01 in)	5.0	5.6	7.2	9.3	12.0	10.3	9.7	9.1	7.1	7.2	5.3	5.6	93.4
Average snowy days (≥ 0.01 in)	4.0	4.5	2.1	1.0	0	0	0	0	0	0.3	1.8	3.8	17.5
Source: NOAA

== Demographics ==
Historical population
Census	Pop.	Note	%±
1890	434		—
1900	365		−15.9%
1910	359		−1.6%
1920	391		8.9%
1930	340		−13.0%
1940	339		−0.3%
1950	352		3.8%
1960	306		−13.1%
1970	347		13.4%
1980	373		7.5%
1990	330		−11.5%
2000	336		1.8%
2010	273		−18.7%
2020	273		0.0%
U.S. Decennial Census

=== 2010 census ===
As of the census of 2010, there were 273 people, 119 households, and 84 families residing in the village. The population density was 827.3 inhabitants per square mile (319.4/km^{2}). There were 143 housing units at an average density of 433.3 per square mile (167.3/km^{2}). The racial makeup of the village was 95.2% White, 1.5% Native American, 0.4% Asian, 0.7% from other races, and 2.2% from two or more races. Hispanic or Latino of any race were 5.5% of the population.

There were 119 households, of which 30.3% had children under the age of 18 living with them, 58.0% were married couples living together, 5.0% had a female householder with no husband present, 7.6% had a male householder with no wife present, and 29.4% were non-families. 25.2% of all households were made up of individuals, and 10.1% had someone living alone who was 65 years of age or older. The average household size was 2.29 and the average family size was 2.67.

The median age in the village was 42.8 years. 23.1% of residents were under the age of 18; 3.6% were between the ages of 18 and 24; 25.3% were from 25 to 44; 28.9% were from 45 to 64; and 19% were 65 years of age or older. The gender makeup of the village was 49.5% male and 50.5% female.

=== 2000 census ===
As of the census of 2000, there were 336 people, 138 households, and 101 families residing in the village. The population density was 1,009.4 inhabitants per square mile (389.7/km^{2}). There were 150 housing units at an average density of 450.6 per square mile (174.0/km^{2}). The racial makeup of the village was 97.02% White, 1.19% Native American, 0.89% from other races, and 0.89% from two or more races. Hispanic or Latino of any race were 0.89% of the population.

There were 138 households, out of which 30.4% had children under the age of 18 living with them, 60.1% were married couples living together, 5.8% had a female householder with no husband present, and 26.8% were non-families. 23.9% of all households were made up of individuals, and 11.6% had someone living alone who was 65 years of age or older. The average household size was 2.43 and the average family size was 2.85.

In the village, the population was spread out, with 25.9% under the age of 18, 9.5% from 18 to 24, 26.2% from 25 to 44, 25.0% from 45 to 64, and 13.4% who were 65 years of age or older. The median age was 38 years. For every 100 females, there were 96.5 males. For every 100 females age 18 and over, there were 99.2 males.

As of 2000 the median income for a household in the village was $37,969, and the median income for a family was $40,000. Males had a median income of $28,611 versus $16,125 for females. The per capita income for the village was $15,660. About 7.0% of families and 9.0% of the population were below the poverty line, including 11.8% of those under age 18 and 4.8% of those age 65 or over.

== Notable person ==
- Ken Brondell, baseball player

== See also ==
- List of municipalities in Nebraska
