= Boone County Museum of History =

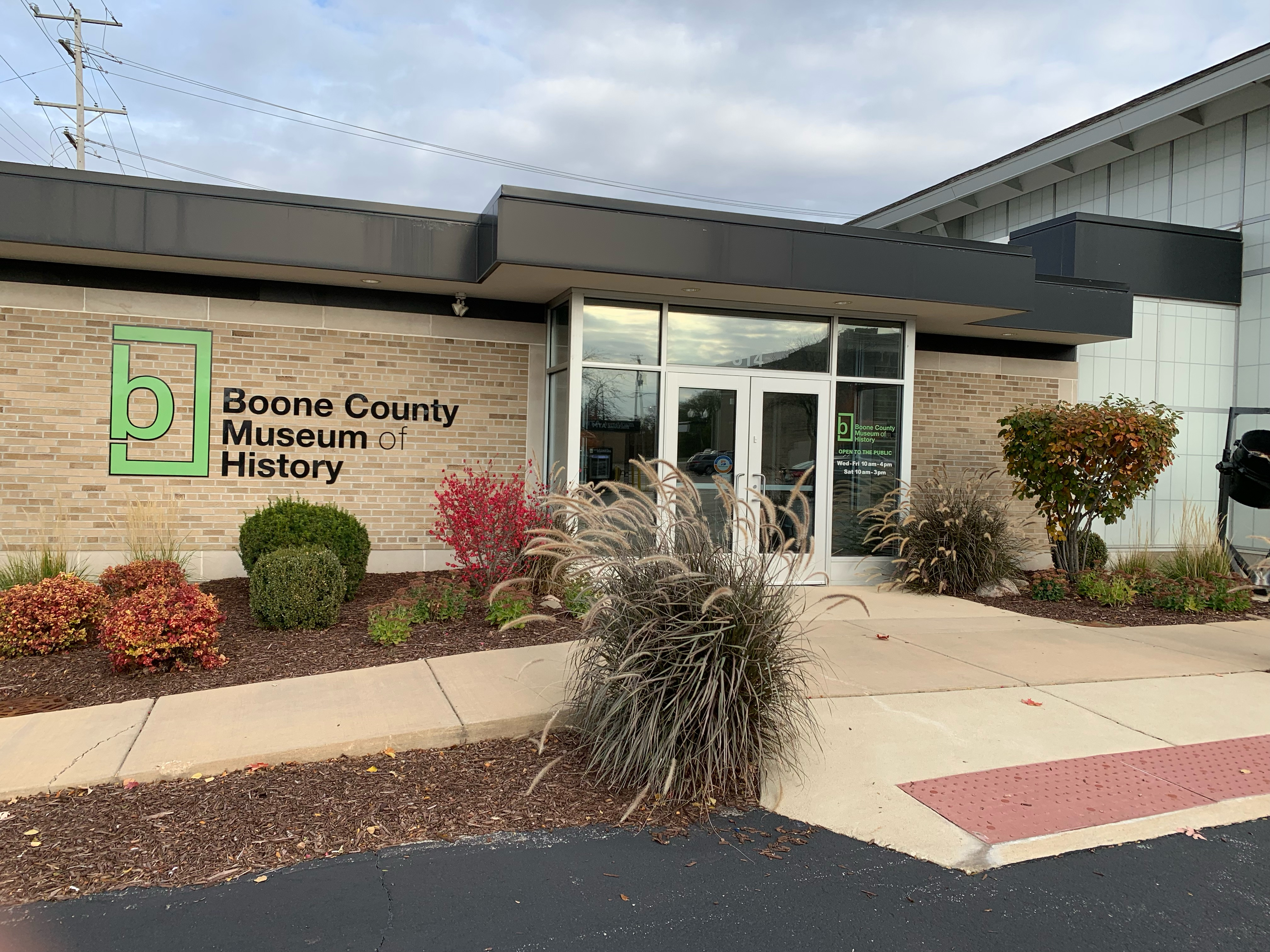
- Accessible front entrance to the Boone County Museum of History
- Established: 1968
- Location: 314 S. State Street, Belvidere, IL 61008
- Coordinates: 42.25736002586222°N 88.84008265202786°W
- Type: History Museum
- Director: Anna Pivoras
- Curator: Chris Gardner
- Website: Official website

Boone County Museum of History is an interactive museum of history, art, and popular culture located in the South State Street Historic District in Belvidere, Illinois. Established by members of the Boone County Historical Society, the museum's mission is to stimulate interest in Boone County history through education, research, and collection and preservation of artifacts and archival material. An extensive museum complex encloses under its roof an exhaustive Boone County archival collection, thousands of artifacts, several historic carriages and vintage automobiles, an exhibit celebrating 1969 Miss America Judith Ford, and the entire two-story pioneer log cabin of a Manchester Township family farm.

== History ==
The Boone County Historical Society was incorporated in 1903, and began collecting items and records from its first announcements. Converted from the downtown Belvidere Gas & Electric building, the Boone County Historical Museum opened to visitors in 1968. In 2013, the museum was re-opened, enlarged by the addition of a neighboring bank building and a more modern, vaulted creation providing meeting and gathering space. A bronze statue by a local artist honoring Boone County first responders is displayed on the museum's grounds.

== Exhibits ==
=== Duxtad log cabin ===
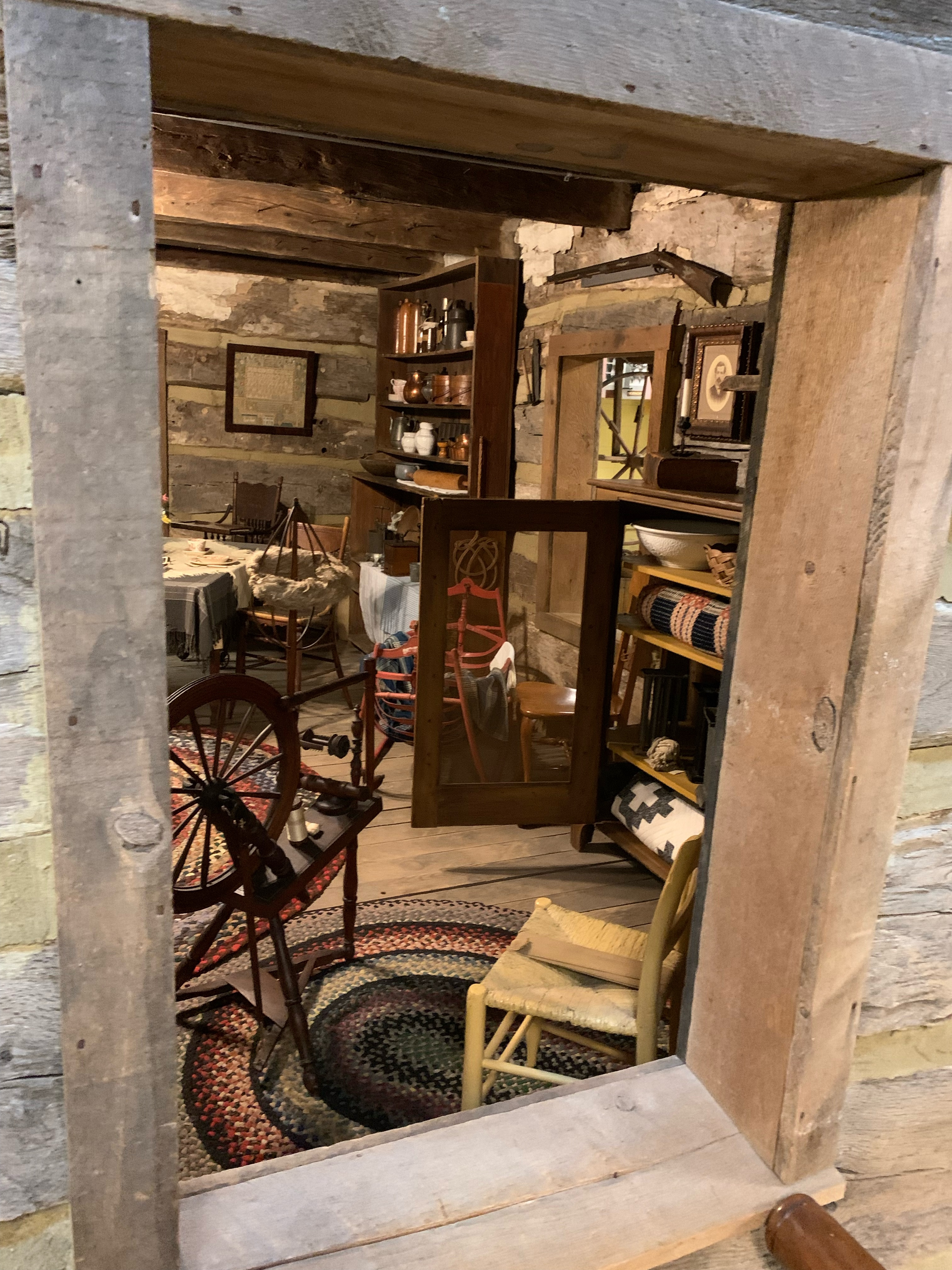
Family area on the first floor of Duxtad cabin

In 1974, the Duxtad family partially disassembled their 130-year old log farmhouse and began moving the entire structure fourteen miles south to be reassembled on a concrete slab next to the museum. By 1976, the entire two-story cabin had been restored and completely enclosed by an extension of the museum's building. Today the first floor of the farmhouse helps demonstrate the tools and artifacts of 1840s pioneer life in Northern Illinois while the second story helps to familiarize young children with concepts of the family farm.

=== Judy Ford exhibit ===
In 1968, local Belvidere beauty Judy Ford competed for Miss Illinois and was eventually selected 1969 Miss America in the national pageant. The museum hosts a number of unique artifacts of Ford's competition and reign, including a short film of her talent competition entry which features Bert Parks serenading Ford with There She Is, Miss America as she wore her crown for the first time.

=== Vehicles ===
In the collection are several rare conveyances, including horse-drawn brougham and hearse carriages. A 1904 Eldredge Runabout manufactured in Belvidere by the National Sewing Machine Company occupies a prominent place in the museum's foyer opposite an ivory 1965 Plymouth Fury II, the first chassis to come off the production line at the Belvidere Assembly Plant, an early donation to the museum by Chrysler. A 1924 Ford Model T convertible occupies a space next to an example of the penny-farthing, the first bicycle.

== Funderburg House ==
In 2020, the Funderburg House, an historic 1906 Belvidere mansion, was donated by K-B Farms. Since the donation, the society has spent time and expertise restoring the donated property as museum and meeting space, officially opening the facility in early 2022 after a preview in December.
