= Belvidere South State Street Historic District =

Historic district in Illinois, United States

- U.S. National Register of Historic Places
- U.S. Historic district
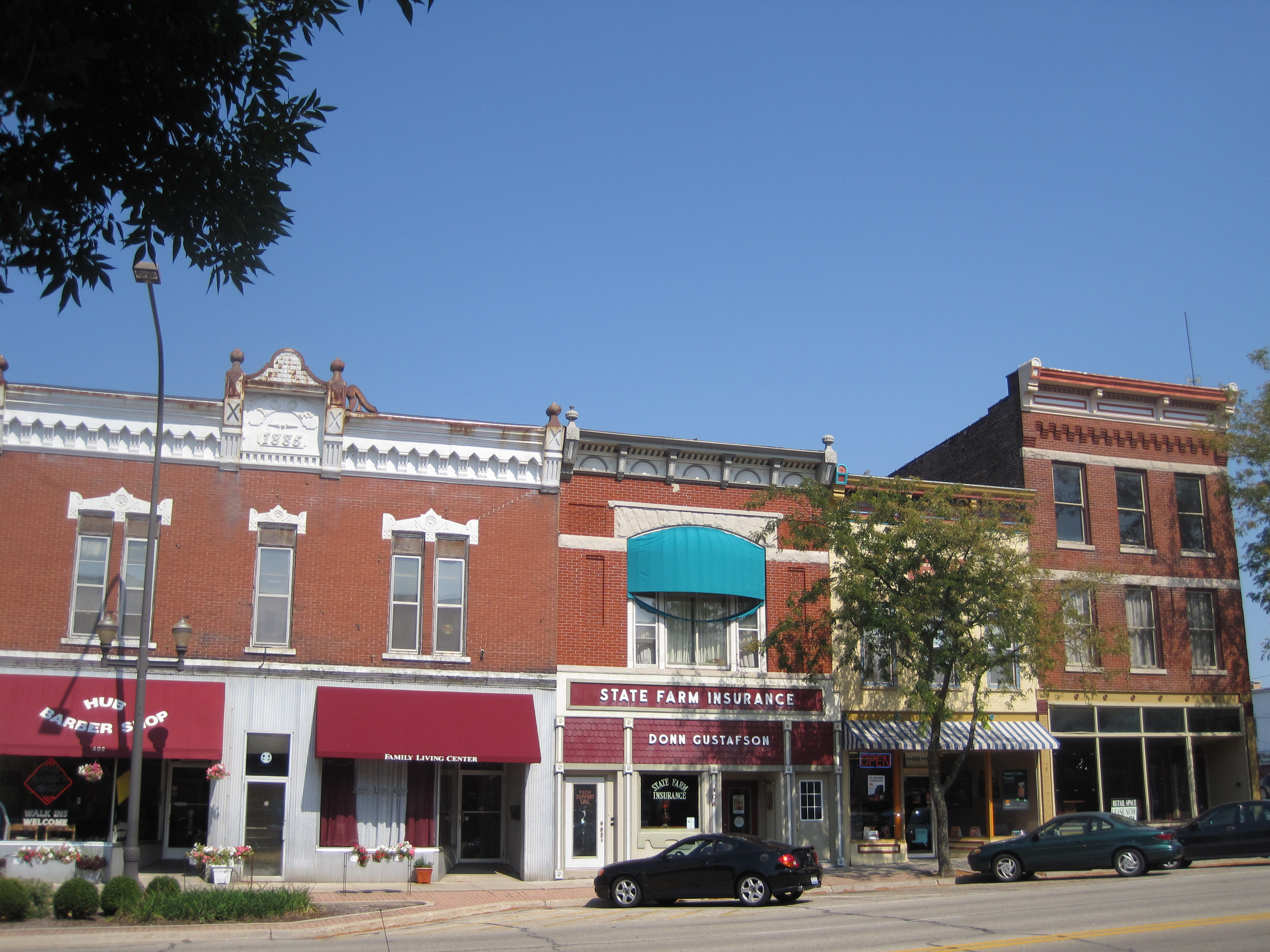

- Location within Illinois Location within the United States
- Location: State Street between Logan Avenue & Madison Street, Belvidere, Illinois
- Coordinates: 42.25583°N 88.83973°W
- Area: 16 acres (6.5 ha)
- Built: 1852
- Architect: Multiple
- Architectural style: Italianate, Commercial Style, Prairie School, Art Deco, Modern Movement
- NRHP reference No.: 12000325
- Added to NRHP: June 6, 2012

The Belvidere South State Street Historic District is a historic district on the north side of the Kishwaukee River in Belvidere, Illinois. It is primarily composed of commercial building representative of architectural trends from 1852 to 1962, the period following the connection of the city to the Galena and Chicago Union Railroad.

== History ==
Belvidere, Illinois, was first settled in 1834. The main commercial development in Belvidere, starting in the 1840s, was along the north side of the river. However, in 1851, the Galena and Chicago Union Railroad decided to build a railroad station on the south side of the river. This fueled the growth of a second commercial district south of the tracks. The area between the north side of the tracks and the river became an industrial center, most notably with the National Sewing Machine Company factory. The district originally extended another block south along State Street (the 300 block), but this area was demolished. On June 6, 2012, the North and South State Street Historic Districts were recognized by the National Park Service with a listing on the National Register of Historic Places. Originally intended to be one large historic district, the demolition of buildings between the railroad tracks and the river resulted in the split into two smaller districts.

== Architecture ==
About two-thirds of the buildings in the district were built before 1900; most of these are designed in the Italianate style. The four buildings at State Street near Pleasant are particularly fine examples of the style with tall narrow windows and pressed metal cornices. The William H. Piel Building and its neighbor at 522 South State Street are good examples of the Chicago School. The Belvidere National Bank and Trust is of a Classical Revival motif with Roman arches and projecting cornices. The Belvidere City Hall, the most recent contributing building in the district, is an example of the International Style. The Old Belvidere High School is the lone example of a Prairie School design, though it also features Classical Revival detailing. The building also features an Art Deco auditorium, the only such design in the district.

== Boundaries ==
The Belvidere South State Street Historic District includes the two city blocks between East Pleasant Street, South State Street, Whitney Boulevard, and Logan Avenue. it also includes the city block surrounded by State, West 1st Street, Pleasant, and Pearl Street. 621 South State Street, on the southwest corner of 1st and State, is also part of the district. Forty-three buildings contribute to the historical integrity of the district, while six recent buildings are considered intrusions. The Old Belvidere High School, itself listed on the NRHP in 1997, is a contributing property to the district.

== See also ==
- Belvidere North State Street Historic District
