= Belvidere North State Street Historic District =

Historic district in Illinois, United States

- U.S. National Register of Historic Places
- U.S. Historic district
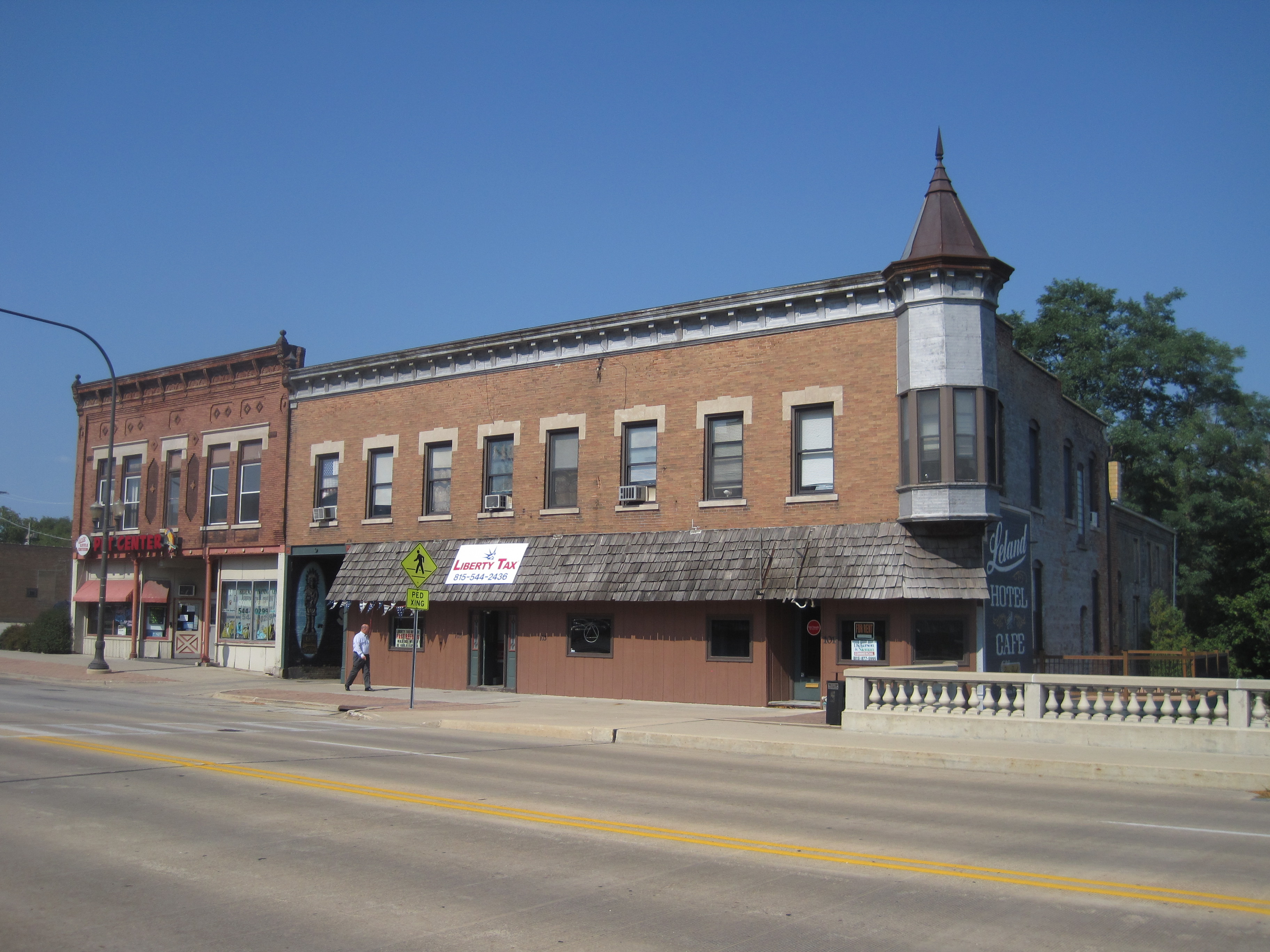

- Location within Illinois Location within the United States
- Location: State Street between Hurlbut Street & Kishwaukee River, Belvidere, Illinois
- Coordinates: 42.26042°N 88.84425°W
- Area: 7.5 acres (3.0 ha)
- Built: 1865
- Architect: Multiple
- Architectural style: Italianate, Commercial Style, Modern Movement
- NRHP reference No.: 12000324
- Added to NRHP: June 6, 2012

The Belvidere North State Street Historic District is a historic district on the north side of the Kishwaukee River in Belvidere, Illinois. It is primarily composed of commercial building representative of architectural trends from 1865 to 1962. The district has remained largely intact since the mid-1930s.

== History ==
Belvidere, Illinois was first settled in 1834. The first commercial development in the town came in 1836, when the Belvidere House opened at the corner of State Street and Lincoln Avenue. Belvidere was a popular stop on the stagecoach line between Chicago and Galena, and the hotel accommodated travelers. The First National Bank, now the oldest commercial building in Belvidere, was built at this intersection in 1865. After Boone County separated from Winnebago County in 1843, the Boone County Courthouse was built on the north side of the river, and the North State Street district became the city's commercial core. The buildings constructed along the corridor included the town's largest theater and ten automobile-related businesses. On June 6, 2012, the North and South State Street Historic Districts were recognized by the National Park Service with a listing on the National Register of Historic Places. Originally intended to be one large historic district, the demolition of buildings between the railroad tracks and the river resulted in the split into two smaller districts.

== Architecture ==
About half of the buildings in the district were constructed before 1900. Most of these older buildings were constructed in the Italianate style, while more recent additions were designed in the Chicago School style. The National House and the First National Bank are considered the two finest early examples of Italianate design in the district. The Longcor Block and the Ransom Building reflect later trends in Italianate style, including metal cornices. The buildings on East Lincoln Avenue—most of which serviced automobiles—are good examples of the Chicago School. The finest example of the style in the district is the Apollo Theater. There are also some examples of modern design in the district, although there are no high-style International Style structures. The more modern designs are found on West Lincoln Avenue.

Contributing buildings include:

- Apollo Theatre (1921), 106 North State St., Commercial style, whose roof collapsed during a sold-out concert in March 2023, remodelled in 2022, reopened following the collapse in September 2023
- National House (c.1890), 226 North State Street, early, high Italianate style, brick building first used as a boarding house (see photo #02 in NRHP registration document)
- First National Bank (c.1850), early Italianate style, 204 North State Street, three-story brick building, home of First National Bank and Brown & Co. Hardware (photos 05 and 07)
- Longcor Block (photo 10), later, high Italianate style
- Ransom Building (photo 12), later, high Italianate style
- Schlenk Brewery (photo 14), later, high Italianate style

== Boundaries ==
The Belvidere North State Street Historic District begins at the north bank of the Kishwaukee River at North State Street and extends two blocks north to East Hurlbut Street. The district also includes one block of Lincoln Avenue on either side of North State Street. Thirty-one buildings and one object contribute to the historical integrity of the district, while nine recent buildings are considered intrusions. The contributing object is a c. 1950 metal plaque commemorating the site of the American House, an 1842 hotel.

== See also ==
- Belvidere South State Street Historic District
