= NDK =

NDK may refer to:

- Nucleoside-diphosphate kinase, an enzyme
- National Palace of Culture, a congress centre in Sofia, Bulgaria
- Nihon Dempa Kogyo Co., Ltd., a crystal device manufacturer in Tokyo, Japan
- Nan Desu Kan, an annual anime convention located in Colorado
- The Android NDK (native development kit), the C/C++ SDK for Android apps.
