= Jennie June =

Jennie June may refer to:

- Jane Cunningham Croly (1829–1901), American author and journalist, better known by her pseudonym "Jennie June"
- Jennie June (autobiographer) (1874–?), one of the earliest transgender individuals to publish an autobiography in the United States
- Jennie June (sewing machine)
