= Boone County Courthouse =

Boone County Courthouse may refer to:

- Boone County Courthouse (Arkansas), Harrison, Arkansas
- Boone County Courthouse (Illinois), Belvidere, Illinois
- Boone County Courthouse (Indiana), Lebanon, Indiana
- Boone County Courthouse (Iowa), Boone, Iowa
- Boone County Courthouse (Missouri), Columbia, Missouri
- Boone County Courthouse (Nebraska), Albion, Nebraska
- Boone County Courthouse (West Virginia), Madison, West Virginia
