= Bessie Leach Priddy =

American educator (1871–1935)

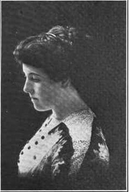
- Bessie Leach Priddy in 1916
- Born: January 18, 1871; Belvidere, Illinois, US
- Died: May 27, 1936 (aged 65); St. Louis, Missouri, US

Academic background
- Education: Adrian College; University of Michigan, Ph.D.

Academic work
- Discipline: History and Political Science
- Institutions: Adrian College; Michigan State Normal College; University of Missouri

Elizabeth "Bessie" Leach Priddy (January 18, 1871 – May 27, 1935) was an American educator, social reformer, clubwoman, and leader of the Delta Delta Delta women's fraternity.

== Early life ==
Priddy was born on January 18, 1871 in Belvidere, Illinois. She attended the Belvidere High School, graduating in 1887. She won a scholarship to Adrian College. While there, she was initiated as a founding member of the Gamma chapter of Delta Delta Delta.

After she graduated from Adrian College in 1891, Priddy was employed for two years as a school principal in Capron, Illinois. To support her family following her husbands death in 1909, she taught German at Adrian College alongside studying towards her State Teachers Certificate.

== Career ==
Priddy taught history at the Michigan State Normal College (now Eastern Michigan University) in Ypsilanti, Michigan, from 1915 to 1918. Along with teaching, she contributed articles to teaching publications, such as writing recommendations on how to teach about World War I for the History Teacher's Magazine. The article was highly praised by G. Stanley Hall, president of Clark University, who called it "the best article he had seen on the subject in English."

Priddy was promoted to dean of women at Michigan State Normal College in 1918. Whilst in post, she and the University president Charles McKenney took disciplinary action against female students found smoking, with seventeen expelled. When one of the expelled students, Alice Tanton, sued the college, Priddy claimed that she had "no choice but to send Miss Tanton home" and that "she had repeated warnings." The expulsion was upheld by the Michigan Supreme Court and Priddy was praised for "maintaining certain ideals" and "upholding some of the old-fashioned ideals of young womanhood."

In 1921, the Michigan State Normal College senior class dedicated its yearbook to Priddy, with the inscription: "To Bessie Leach Priddy, Dean of Women and Mother to us all, this volume is lovingly dedicated." The Normal College News reported that "she has endeared herself to the girls of the college and has proved an efficient and wise administrator." In 1922, she gave a talk at the local YMCA on "What a College Man Can Do."

The Bessie Leach Priddy Scholarship Fund was launched in her honour in 1923, when she moved on to her next employer. Priddy was appointed the dean of women at the University of Missouri, in 1923. While in post, she expelled eleven students, including four female students, for drinking liquor.

Priddy retired in 1934.

== Personal life ==
She married attorney and postmaster Frank E. Priddy on August 15, 1893. They had three children, Irene, Allan, and Frances. Frank Priddy died on February 25, 1909.

Priddy became chairwoman of the Civics Department of the General Federation of Women's Clubs and in 1918 presented the biannual meeting with a "resolution in favour of state censorship of motion pictures," which passed. In 1919, she was amongst the compilers of the Handbook for Women Voters of Michigan, described as "a practical guide in citizenship."

Priddy remained active in Delta Delta Delta. During her tenure as their national historian, she wrote A Detailed Record of Delta Delta Delta, 1888–1907, which was the first such publication by any women's organization. She also wrote A Detailed Record of Delta Delta Delta 1888-31. In 1931, she was elected Tri Delta's national president.

Priddy died of heart disease on May 27, 1935, in St. Louis, Missouri. She was awarded an honorary masters degree in education from Michigan State Normal College in 1935, which was granted posthumously.
