= Apollo Theatre (Belvidere, Illinois) =

Theater In Belvidere, IL

Apollo Activity Center
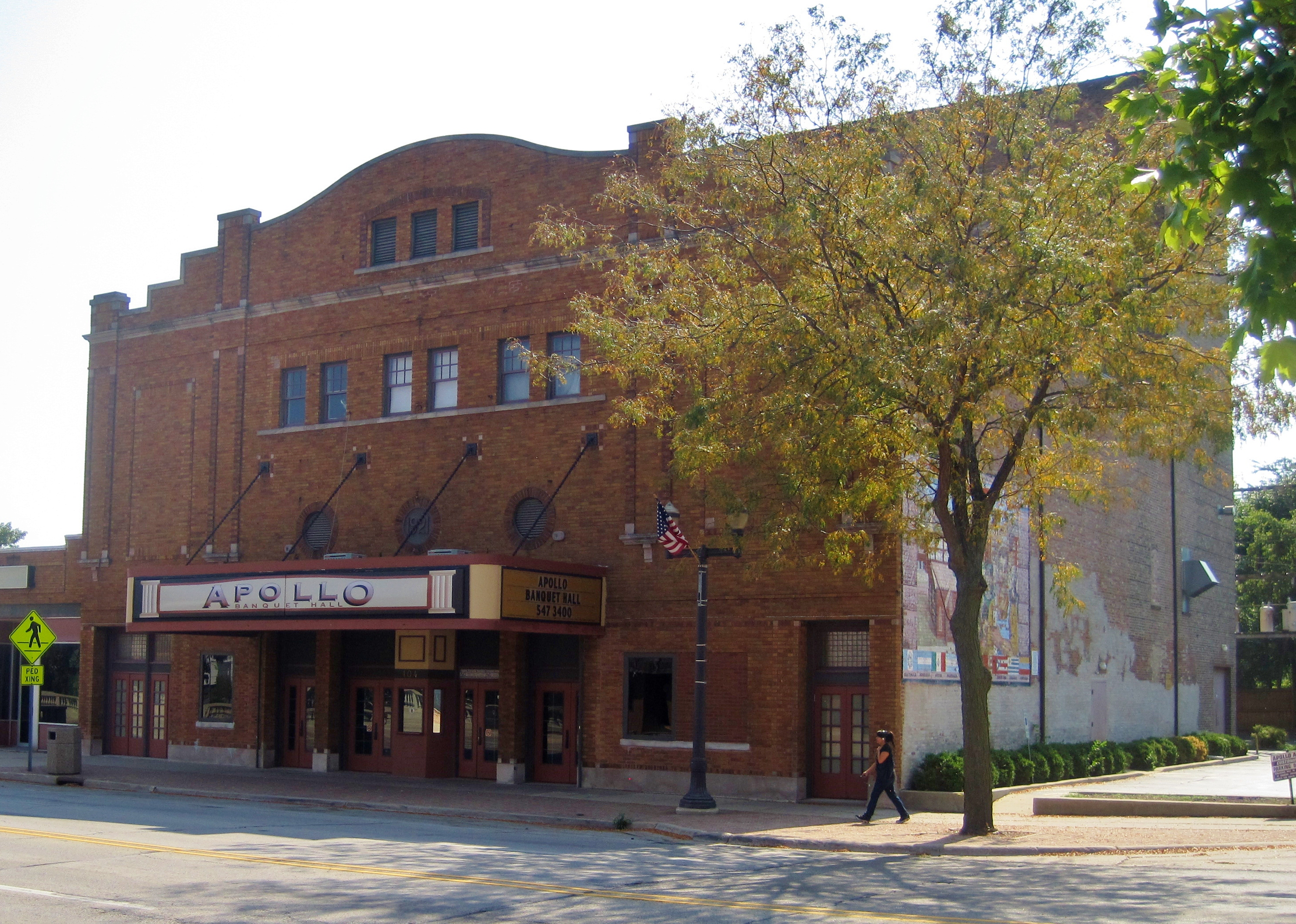
- Interactive map of Apollo Activity Center
- Full name: Apollo Activity Center
- Address: 104 N State St; Belvidere, IL; United States
- Coordinates: 42°15′34″N 88°50′37″W

Construction
- Opened: January 11, 1922; 104 years ago

Website
- https://www.apolloactivitycenter.com/
- Apollo Theatre
- U.S. Historic district – Contributing property
- Location within Illinois Location within the United States
- Location: 104 N State St., Belvidere, IL
- Built: 1922
- Architectural style: Commercial Style
- Part of: Belvidere North State Street Historic District (ID12000324)
- Designated CP: June 6, 2012

The Apollo Activity Center, historically known as the Apollo Theatre, is a theater and concert venue in Belvidere, Illinois, United States. Built in 1921, the Apollo is a contributing property in downtown Belvidere's North State Street Historic District, on the north bank of the Kishwaukee River. On March 31, 2023, the Apollo's roof collapsed in the midst of a tornado outbreak, during a concert attended by 260 people.

== History ==
The Apollo was built and initially managed by the Rhinehart family of Belvidere. The theater was designed to host stage shows and films, featuring a pipe organ for live musical accompaniment. The Apollo's predecessor was the Derthick Opera House, located on the same site, which was destroyed by fire in 1917.

The Apollo opened on January 11, 1922, seating 950. The theater was built in commercial style by local general contractor and stonemason Edward Byron Glass. The theater's decor includes simplistic stone and masonry designs on top of steel frames, with an overall focus on fireproofing.

The theater was the subject, and filming location, of Don O. Newland's 1926 film Belvidere's Hero.

Air conditioning was added in 1931, and further renovations continued into 1940. A period of decline began in the 1950s. It became an x-rated movie theater in 1971 but became a regular theater three years later, culminating in a major fire in 1975. The building cycled through owners until a long-term closure beginning in the 1980s.

The theater reopened as the Apollo Theatre AC banquet hall in 2001, with Belvidere-based insurance agent Maria Martinez leading the effort to reopen the theater.

The theater was listed as a contributing property to the Belvidere North State Street Historic District in 2012.

== Collapse ==
On March 31, 2023, the Storm Prediction Center issued a high risk for severe weather, including tornadoes and an official Tornado Watch was issued at 2:35 p.m. An official tornado warning was subsequently issued at 7:24 p.m. CDT at which point Apollo Theater management halted the scheduled performance and had patrons remain inside the building to wait out the storm. The tornado reportedly struck at 7:44 p.m. CDT, causing the theater's roof and marquee to collapse. The National Weather Service reported "possible tornado damage" to the theater, with winds in the area reaching 90 miles per hour (140 km/h). An official damage survey revealed that an EF1 tornado had hit the building.

Four death metal bands were scheduled to play on the evening of the collapse: Morbid Angel, Revocation, Skeletal Remains and Crypta. Approximately 260 people were inside the venue at the time of the collapse, which killed one person and injured 48 others.

The theater reopened on September 15, 2023, less than six months after the tornado. At a private event commemorating the structure's restoration, Martinez stated that funding for the project had been primarily from insurance and personal funds, with none coming from disaster relief funds at the state or national level. The theater's first public event following the collapse was a free concert coinciding with Mexican Independence Day.
