= Edwardsville Amazon warehouse collapse =

2021 tornado strike at an Amazon warehouse

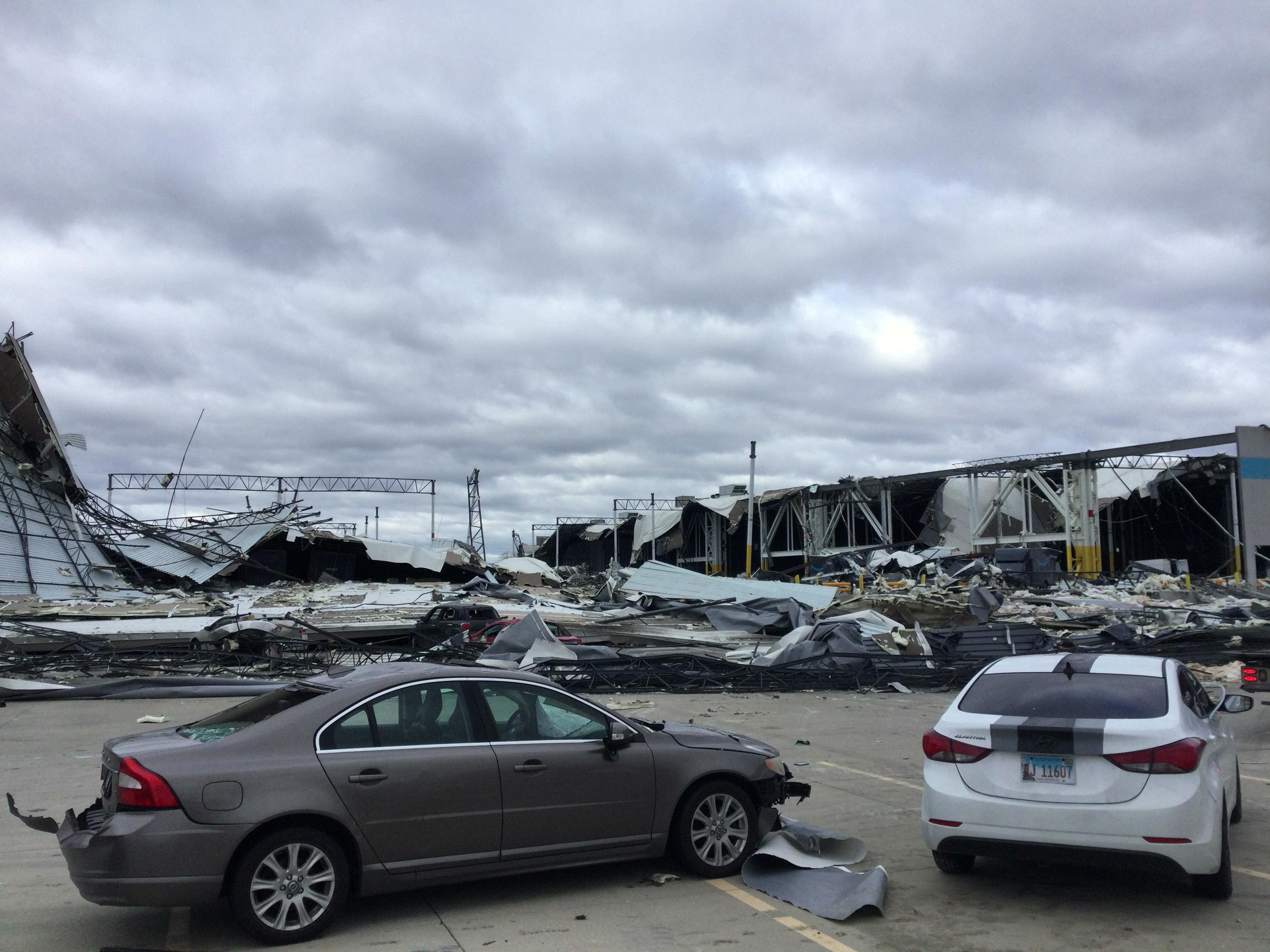
- The destroyed warehouse on December 11
- Date: December 10, 2021
- Time: 8:29 p.m. (CST (UTC−6))
- Location: Edwardsville, Illinois, U.S.; 38°45′58″N 90°02′10″W
- Cause: Tornado
- Deaths: 6
- Injuries: 4 (1 critical)

On the evening of December 10, 2021, the Amazon Logistics DLI4 delivery facility in Edwardsville, Illinois collapsed after being struck by an EF3 tornado, killing 6 workers in the facility and injuring 4. The building was constructed with a storm shelter, but its location was not properly communicated to workers, and workers sheltering in a different part of the building were killed in the collapse.

Amazon was criticized for its handling of the event by politicians, media, and advocates. The company was initially unable to compile a list of workers in the building to assist emergency responders, and Amazon founder Jeff Bezos attended a Blue Origin rocket launch the next day before issuing a statement about the collapsed warehouse.

The Edwardsville tornado was part of a large late-season tornado outbreak across the central and southern United States, which caused over 80 deaths in total. A separate tornado in the outbreak destroyed a similarly-constructed industrial building in Mayfield, Kentucky. When the DLI4 facility was rebuilt and reopened in 2024, neither it nor any other facility in the commercial district it was located in had any storm shelters, nor was the new structure of DLI4 built to withstand the extreme winds that the initial tornado produced.

== Background ==
In 2016, Amazon announced its intent to open two new e-commerce fulfillment facilities in Edwardsville, Illinois, 16 miles (26 km) east of downtown St. Louis. Each of the fulfillment facilities would cover 700,000 square feet (16 acres; 65,000 m^{2}). Amazon's logistics network includes multiple types of fulfillment centers, which contain different machinery depending on the size of the items stored there; the Edwardsville site included one facility for larger items and one for smaller items. After customer orders are packaged at fulfillment centers, packages are transported to smaller delivery stations to be sorted and loaded onto trucks for delivery.

The opening of the two fulfillment facilities was predicted to contribute to the creation of 1,000 full-time jobs for the region, which Mayor of Edwardsville Hal Patton described as a "much-needed employment opportunity" for the area. The facilities are located in the Lakeview Commerce Center, a commercial development site brokered by CBRE Group in Edwardsville. The site also hosted facilities for J.F. Electric, Spectrum Brands, and World Wide Technology by 2020.

The two Amazon fulfillment facilities opened in August 2017, with the building focusing on larger items referred to as STL4 and the one for smaller items as STL6. One year later, in August 2017, the first public tour of STL4 was given to news media, "members of the community", and to federal-level politicians Dick Durbin and John Shimkus. At the time, both facilities combined had over 2,000 employees, over twice as much as projections made the year prior.

In 2018, Contegra Construction constructed the shell of an Amazon delivery station building at the corporate complex, designated DLI4 in Amazon's network. At DLI4's completion in September 2020, the warehouse took up a total of 594,000 square feet (13.6 acres; 55,200 m^{2}), of which 15,000 square feet (0.34 acres; 1,400 m^{2}) was office space. DLI4 was designed by architectural firm Richard L. Bowen & Associates.

Throughout December 2021, ahead of the Christmas holiday, Amazon's DLI4 site had around 190 employees across all shifts, according to a spokesperson. A majority of the workforce employed at the site were contracted delivery drivers, and expected demand from the holiday prompted the company to increase the number of these contractors. Having fewer full-time delivery workers was part of an initiative at Amazon starting in 2018 to reduce the company's reliance on external carrier services. Only seven full-time employees were at DLI4 at the time of the tornado.

=== Initial severe weather forecasts ===
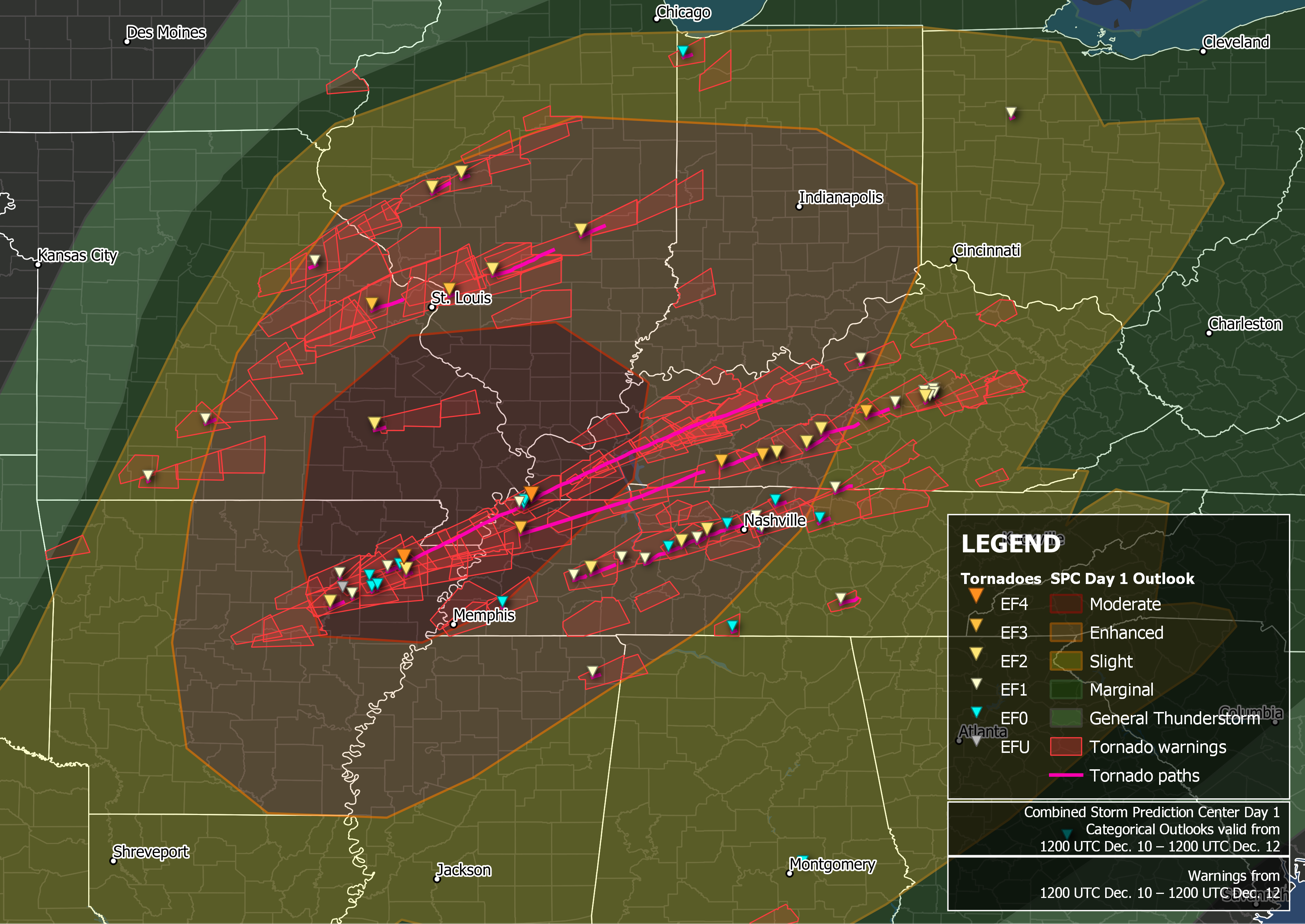
Map of confirmed tornadoes in the December 10–11 outbreak

Forecasters at the National Weather Service office in St. Louis, Missouri were tracking a potential severe weather event across parts of Missouri and southern Illinois. A forecast discussion on the afternoon of December 9 outlined that Friday, December 10, would be warm across the region, as a low-pressure system ejecting from the Rocky Mountains would bring in anomalously high dew points and temperatures that, in areas southeast of St. Louis, were forecasted to potentially exceed 70 °F (21 °C), in places where low-level cloud cover could dissipate earlier in the day. The system was forecasted to move through the St. Louis office's area of responsibility in the time frame between 02Z and 09Z Saturday, or between 8 p.m. Friday through and 3 a.m. Saturday, Central Standard Time. Confidence also existed that storms produced by the system could produce tornadoes, and would be moving very quickly.

Forecasters at the Storm Prediction Center in Norman, Oklahoma, were expecting a severe weather event to occur on the evening of December 10. An enhanced risk, the third highest risk the agency issues, was outlined across much of the middle Mississippi River valley shortly before midnight on the 9th. This included St. Louis and surrounding areas, with risks outlined for damaging wind, large hail, and tornadoes. At this time, it was expected that storms across Missouri were going to form after sunset, and would evolve into a squall line, potentially limiting the threat of supercell tornadoes, except for those forming ahead of the line earlier in the evening. It was also noted that, at the time, the HREF forecast model was inconsistent on the location and timing of where storms would form initially.

By the 10th's 1630Z outlook, outlined at 5:08 p.m. Central Daylight Time, the St. Louis area remained under an enhanced risk; however, a moderate risk, the second-highest risk applicable, was introduced further south. Confidence was strong that sufficient atmospheric conditions would produce strong tornadoes throughout the day across parts of the middle Mississippi and lower Ohio River valleys.

=== Onset of severe weather ===
The supercell that produced both the Defiance, Missouri, and Edwardsville, Illinois, tornadoes, throughout the latter's lifespan

At 5:20 p.m., forecasters at the Storm Prediction Center issued a tornado watch for much of Missouri and parts of Illinois, including Madison County. This watch was effective until 11:00 p.m. that night. Seven minutes later, in a mesoscale discussion, forecasters discussed the conditions over the region in greater detail. By this time, storms recently initiated over southwestern Missouri, in the vicinity of Springfield. As atmospheric conditions across the region degraded later on that evening, the threat for severe weather would increase. This discussion specifically outlined an area of eastern Missouri where it was expected that mature storms could interact with an area of supporting atmospheric conditions, producing the region's "best chance for tornadoes". At 7:02 p.m., another such discussion detailed how a line of storms was present over central Missouri, some exhibiting features of embedded supercell thunderstorms. One of these storms, with the coldest cloud tops of the line, was directly heading towards St. Louis. This storm was outlined as responsible for an elevated threat of tornadoes and other severe weather, given atmospheric parameters at the time.

That evening, multiple strong tornadoes struck the St. Louis National Weather Service office's area of responsibility. Of these, three were caused by a single supercell. The first of these, rated EF3, touched down at 7:35 p.m. and caused significant damage in Defiance, Missouri. Before it lifted at 8:01 p.m. west of Bridgeton, Missouri, this tornado resulted in 1 death and two injuries. Five minutes later, at 8:06 p.m., a tornado warning was issued for Edwardsville and surrounding areas, as forecasters tracked what was believed to be an ongoing tornado in Bridgeton, Missouri.

As weather conditions began to worsen across the Edwardsville area, one contractor for Boxify Logistics stated that some delivery drivers were told to park in a designated area or return home, with others being instructed to return to DLI4. Another delivery worker recalls talking to dispatcher Kevin Dickey, who would die in the tornado, who asked them to check on weather conditions in surrounding areas, before telling them to "get home safe".

At 8:06 p.m. and again at 8:16 p.m., the Edwardsville Amazon facilities would receive notice of imminent severe weather through a web application. When the warning was received by DLI4's manager, they alongside an assistant began traversing the warehouse on foot to let other workers know about the storm, and to gather at the site's northern bathroom, which was the site's designated shelter for severe weather. A later investigation determined that a megaphone, which was meant to coordinate such information, was "locked in a cage and not accessible", and that the instructions to "take shelter in the restroom" led to confusion on whether the northern or southern bathroom of DLI4 was the designated shelter. OSHA determined that 10 employees took shelter in a bathroom on the southern side of the building.

The tornado that would strike the DLI4 warehouse, which was spawned by the same parent supercell thunderstorm as the EF3 tornado in Defiance, Missouri, first touched down to the west of the I-270/I-255 interchange at 8:27 p.m.

== Collapse ==
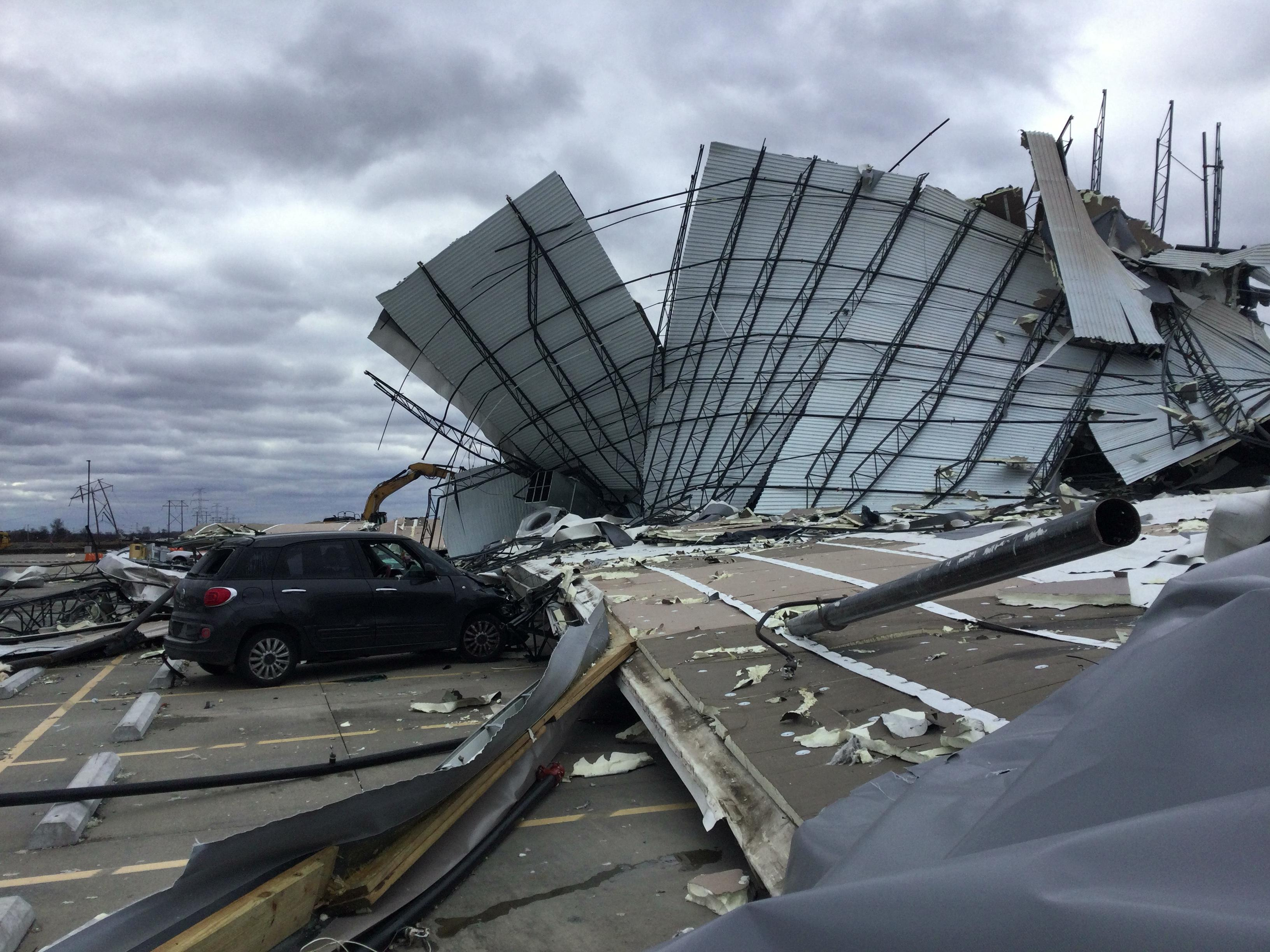
Damage to the Amazon facility and nearby high-voltage power lines

Post-event assessments determined that the tornado struck DLI4 at 8:29 p.m., with wind speeds estimated at 150 miles per hour (240 km/h). The tornado struck DLI4's western face, and collapsed the western wall of the warehouse onto the bathroom. The inward failure of the west-facing walls of DLI4 was the first of multiple structural failures across the warehouse as the tornado moved through, including other walls and a large part of the roof. The eastern wall collapsed into a parking lot. Approximately 150 yards (140 m) of DLI4 collapsed in total. After this, the tornado moved through DLI4's rear parking lot, from where cars were scattered east of the warehouse. In addition, multiple high-tension transmission towers and overhead power lines were destroyed.

Video of the tornado immediately after striking DLI4
- "Video shows tornado in Edwardsville, Illinois" – Danielle Henke via KSDK on YouTube
- https://www.youtube.com/watch?v=wsBzadyNWRY

The tornado damage survey carried out by the St. Louis National Weather Office determined the EF3 rating from the degree of damage 7, described as "[t]otal destruction of large section of building or entire building", inflicted onto damage indicator 23, Warehouse Building (WHB). DLI4 was struck at the tornado's peak intensity. Throughout the rest of Edwardsville, damage primarily occurred to trees, power infrastructure, and roofs, with a mobile home being destroyed; however, damage was relatively minor and only rated up to EF1. The tornado lifted at 8:32 p.m., only being on the ground for 6 minutes; later on, the supercell would produce another long-lived EF2 tornado that struck the community of Bingham and Ramsey State Park.

=== Fatalities ===
Two of the deceased and the sole non-fatal injury were delivery contractors for Xseed Delivery of Bolingbrook, Illinois. One was a contractor for AB&C D.A.D Inc. of Belleville, Illinois. One was a contractor for Boxify Logistics in St. Louis, Missouri. One was a contractor for real-estate firm CBRE Group who had been assigned to the Edwardsville facility; the only death not inflicted to an outside delivery contractor. All of the deceased were in the building's southern bathroom.

Name	Age	Residence	Additional notes	Ref.
Deandre S. Morrow	28	St. Louis, Missouri	At a press event after the collapse, Morrow's mother Deon stated that Deandre took the day off but was called in to work on December 10.	
Kevin D. Dickey	62	Carlyle, Illinois		
Clayton Lynn Cope	29	Alton, Illinois	In a phone conversation with his parents shortly before the tornado struck, Cope stated he "needed to tell someone" upon being informed of the imminent danger. Cope's body was recovered at around 4:30 a.m. on December 11. Cope was a maintenance mechanic at the warehouse and his death was the only fatality to not be a delivery contractor.	
Etheria S. Hebb	34	St. Louis, Missouri	Hebb, a mother of a 1-year-old, spent the minutes before the tornado conversing in a bathroom shelter with Jaeira Hargrove, a coworker, who was also Hebb's cousin. When the tornado struck, both Hebb and Hargrove were thrown to the floor, and Hebb was unresponsive after the storm passed.	
Larry E. Virden	46	Collinsville, Illinois	Virden attempted to restock his delivery vehicle at DLI4 during the tornado warning, and according to a text message conversation six minutes before the tornado, was not allowed to leave "because of the weather condition". A family member's attempts to use the iPhone's ability to geolocate Virden was unsuccessful following the tornado.	
Austin J. McEwen	26	Edwardsville, Illinois		

=== Immediate response ===
Radio communications from Edwardsville FD responding to the collapse
- "Amazon Warehouse Tornado/Collapse Fire Department Audio 12/10/2021 [Illinois]" – Edwardsville Fire Department via Broadcastify and Fireground Audio Archive on YouTube
- https://www.youtube.com/watch?v=dVZZJRGV6bg

The first call informing emergency management to the situation at DLI4 came at around 8:35 p.m. Emergency personnel arrived at the scene within 6 minutes. At 8:41 p.m., six minutes after the first call, operators received a 911 call from inside the southern bathroom, where two women were trapped with a third, deceased woman, who was unresponsive and "bent in half" by rubble. (Note: The only woman to die in DLI4 was 34-year-old Etheria Hebb.) The first reports from the warehouse indicated that there were an estimated 85 people inside of the warehouse and an unknown number of delivery drivers as well. As there were believed to be over 50 on-site, Edwardsville Fire Chief James Whiteford activated mutual aid from surrounding communities in Illinois and Missouri.

At about 9:17 p.m., requests were received by emergency personnel in St. Louis County, Missouri to assist in the commercial building collapse. At this time, television station KSDK estimated 30 to 40 emergency vehicles were at the warehouse assisting the "major emergency response." Within the first 24 hours, Edwardsville Fire Chief James Whiteford claims the collapse provoked a response from 52 rescue agencies with a collective 195 vehicles and 375 personnel.

Water and gas were actively leaking at DLI4, which alongside downed electrical mains posed a hazard to emergency management staff when they first arrived at the warehouse. Nonetheless, multiple people were removed from underneath rubble and brought to safety by both emergency management and other Amazon employees after the building collapsed. An employee in the northern bathroom stated that they spent "at least two-and-a-half hours" sheltering before leaving.

== Aftermath ==
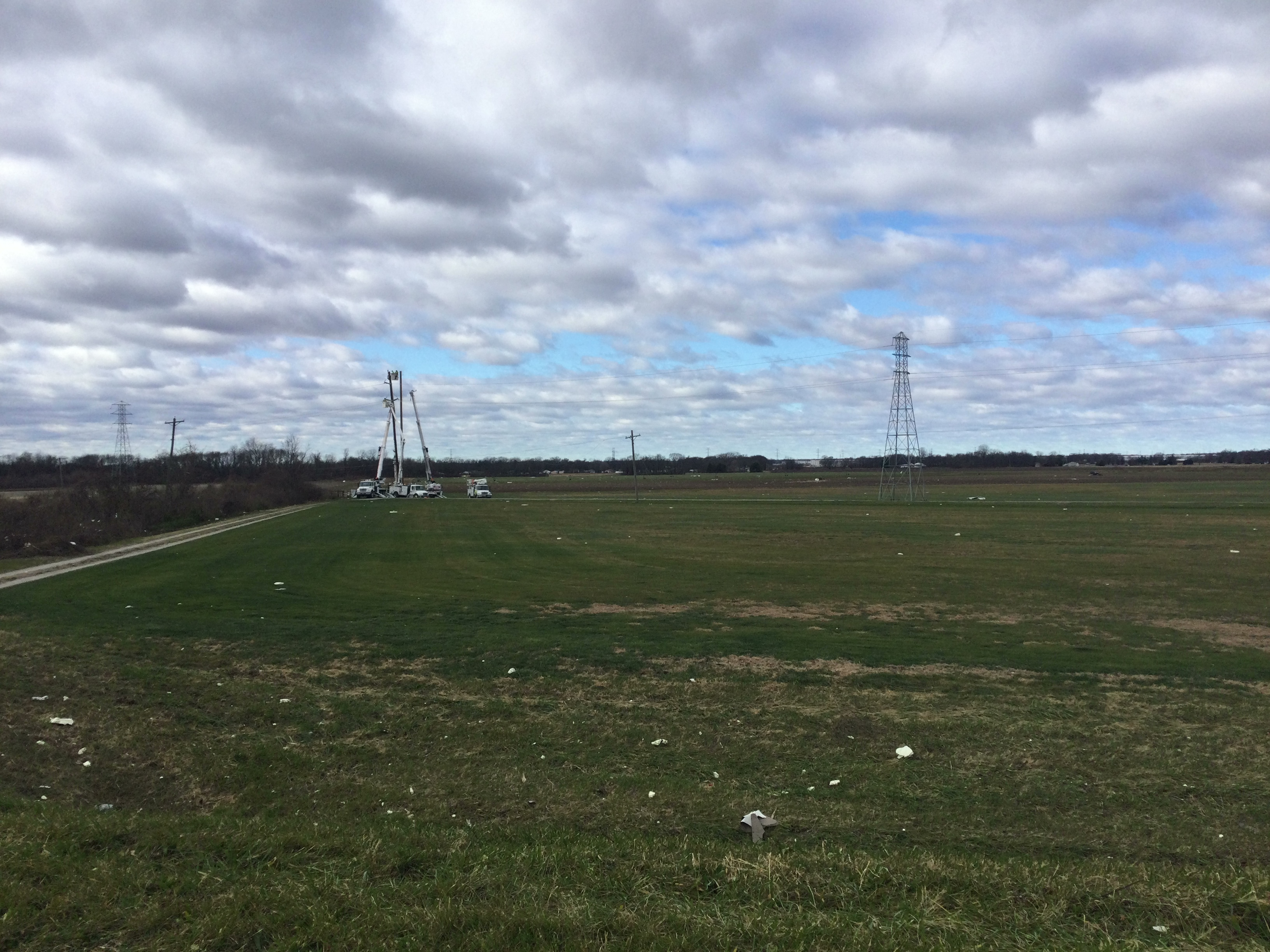
Debris from the DLI4 Amazon facility was noted throughout the tornado's path.

After DLI4 was struck by the tornado, debris lofted by the tornado formed a tornado debris signature, allowing forecasters to detect the tornado using the WSR-88D weather radar operated by the St. Louis National Weather Office. A new tornado warning was issued at 8:33 p.m. for Madison and Bond counties in Illinois. Notably, this warning employed particularly dangerous situation terminology, stating that "a confirmed large and extremely dangerous tornado" could be verified from radar data over Edwardsville. Debris fallout from DLI4 was found by surveyors throughout the parent supercell's path, "tens of miles" from the facility across the storm's "entire path", which extended through Shelby County, Illinois, 70 mi (110 km) away.

KSDK reported one year after the tornado that "[a]s much warning as meteorologists could give was given on that day". The St. Louis National Weather Service office expected severe conditions up to three days before they occurred, and fully staffed the office on the evening of December 10 accordingly. The killer Defiance and Edwardsville tornadoes were described as going along with that day's meteorological forecasts.

=== Reactions ===
The day after the collapse, Amazon founder Jeff Bezos attended the Blue Origin NS-19 launch while search-and-rescue operations for DLI4 were ongoing. Several hours after posting a celebratory Instagram photo with the NS-19 crew following the launch, Bezos released a statement on Twitter on the Edwardsville warehouse collapse. Several users of the site reacted negatively to Bezos, who owns Blue Origin and had been in Texas at the time, publicly prioritizing the launch over addressing the situation in Edwardsville. The editorial board of the Chicago Tribune similarly criticized Amazon, highlighting that the company did not participate in a press conference at the site on the morning of December 11, which was attended by Illinois Governor JB Pritzker.

=== House Oversight Committee investigation ===
On April 1, 2022, the federal House Oversight Committee launched an investigation into Amazon regarding workplace safety and Amazon's policies in the context of preserving the wellbeing of their workers during natural disasters. Democratic lawmakers Carolyn Maloney (representative from New York's 12th congressional district), Cori Bush (representative from Missouri's 1st congressional district), and Alexandria Ocasio-Cortez (representative from New York's 14th congressional district) sent a letter to Amazon and its CEO Jeff Bezos requesting more information on the matter in conjunction with the investigation.

=== Legal action ===
On January 17, 2022, the first of many lawsuits, a wrongful death suit on behalf of Austin McEwen, was filed against Amazon, Contegra Construction and TriStar Properties, LLC. The initial suit alleged that Amazon was aware of the potential for severe weather and failed to adequately preserve the life of McEwen and the others that died in the collapse, with both the facility's emergency plans and construction to applicable building codes questioned. On April 19, 2022, two additional lawsuits were filed against Amazon, alongside Contegra, TriStar, and three engineering groups; a wrongful death suit on the behalf of DeAndre Morrow, and a lawsuit alleging emotional distress on behalf of four survivors that suffered physical or mental injuries in the collapse of DLI4. These lawsuits pointed out that a report from structural engineers and West County EMA & Fire Protection District found that the structure of DLI4 lacked bolt or weld anchoring at the base of some columns, being directly secured with caulk, and that engineers were "very concerned" as to the structural stability of the rest of the facility. One lawsuit was represented by civil rights attorney Benjamin Crump. In November 2022, the case against two of the three firms besides those named in the initial lawsuit was dropped.

=== OSHA investigation ===
On April 26, 2022, WLS-TV in Chicago reported that the Occupational Safety and Health Administration, or OSHA, had completed their investigation of the collapse of DLI4 the previous December. OSHA introduced three recommendations for Amazon's facilities; safety drills, location-specific emergency plans, and warning devices such as megaphones readily accessible. Later in July, WBBM-TV reported that federal prosecutors opened a probe into safety practices at multiple Amazon warehouses in connection with OSHA's investigation at DLI4. In addition, the U.S. Attorney's office began its investigation into potential efforts from Amazon to fraudulently hide injuries sustained by workers from officials.

=== Reconstruction of DLI4 ===
Edwardsville Fire Chief James Whiteford disclosed at a public safety committee meeting on April 22, 2022, that the owner of DLI4, who was independent of Amazon, applied to rebuild DLI4. Edwardsville's public works department received the request on the same day that OSHA released the findings of its investigation into DLI4's collapse. An engineer working for the city of Edwardsville mandated that in order for the warehouse to be rebuilt, it must be built to the standards outlined in the 2015 revision of the International Building Code, instead of the 2006 revision that the original warehouse was built to.

By December 10, 2022, one year after the tornado struck, the exterior of DLI4 was nearly completed. Following efforts to restore the facility's interior, DLI4 fully reopened on September 4, 2024, which was exactly 1,000 days after the tornado. The rebuilt warehouse was built with walls specified to withstand wind gusts of 114 mph (183 km/h), above the 90 mph (140 km/h) specifications of the previous construction. However, St. Louis Public Radio noted that neither the rebuilt DLI4 warehouse, nor any other building in the Lakeview Commerce Center, had storm shelters at the time of reopening.

=== Legislative impact ===
In January 2023, the Warehouse Safety Standards Task Force, a state-level legislative effort led by Illinois lawmakers, was established to investigate safety standards at warehouses across the state, following the OSHA investigation into Amazon's handling of the tornado. The task force heard arguments from various organizations, which pointed out that while most tornadoes are weaker than the Edwardsville tornado and do not produce wind gusts above 110 mph (180 km/h), warehouses are vulnerable to such storms and should either be built to withstand stronger winds or be constructed with shelters. In addition, Greg Bryant of the Masonry Structural Coalition brought up a 2004 tornado in Roanoke, Illinois, which destroyed a heavily occupied manufacturing plant, but proper sheltering procedures led to no fatalities.

Among the task force's recommendations were instating a requirement for site-specific plans for emergencies, employers to better prepare for tornadoes, and for the Illinois General Assembly to regularly provide funding for the Mutual Aid Box Alarm System, an intergovernmental set of mutual aid agreements for fire departments.

After the tornado, the city of Edwardsville amended its city code, requiring buildings to withstand wind gusts of 114 mph (183 km/h).

== See also ==
- 2021 Western Kentucky tornado – an EF4 tornado that struck a factory near Mayfield, Kentucky about one hour later
- Belvidere Apollo Theatre collapse – another tornado-related structural collapse in Illinois less than two years later
- St. Louis tornado history
