= Old Belvidere High School (Belvidere, Illinois) =

- Belvidere High School
- U.S. National Register of Historic Places
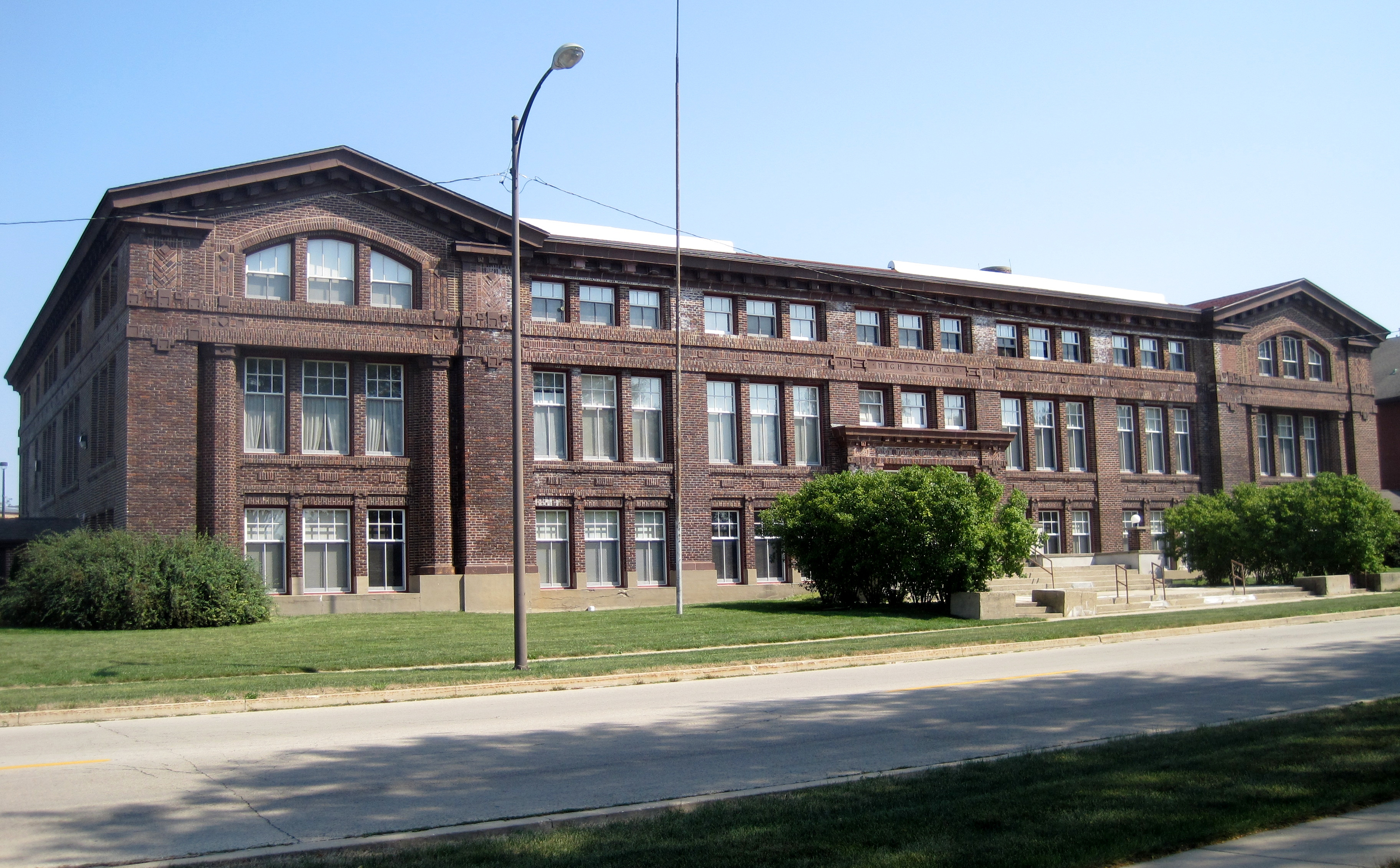
- The 1916 building

- Location within Illinois Location within the United States
- Location: Jct. of Pearl and First Sts., Belvidere, Illinois
- Coordinates: 42°15′17″N 88°50′27″W
- Area: 2 acres (0.81 ha)
- Built: 1893–1939
- Architect: Grant C. Miller, Raymond A. Orput
- Architectural style: Prairie School, Classical Revival, Art Deco
- NRHP reference No.: 97000815
- Added to NRHP: July 25, 1997

The old Belvidere High School is a complex of four connected buildings that reflect three different architectural styles: Classical Revival, Prairie School, and Art Deco. It is composed of the 1893 Garfield School, a 1900 powerhouse, the 1916 Belvidere High School, and the 1939 Belvidere High School Auditorium & Gymnasium.

== History ==
The first public schooling in Belvidere, Illinois began in 1842. Classes were typically taught in churches or private residences. The first public school building built in the town was a stone building built in the 1850s. In 1893, the Garfield School was built just south of Washington High School for both grade and high school students. The two-story building originally had thirteen rooms. As Belvidere's population continued to grow, school officials struggled to prevent classrooms from overcrowding. In 1914, they determined that a new high school should replace the demolished Washington High School. In 1916, the new building, designed by Prairie School architect Grant C. Miller of Miller, Gullenwider & Dowling, was completed. The two buildings were together known as Belvidere High School. By 1938, the high school population of Belvidere High School grew to 500. The school district successfully applied for grants from the Public Works Administration, receiving over $62,000. Rockford architect Raymond A. Orput of Orput & Orput designed the resulting auditorium and gymnasium addition. The addition was one of the first buildings to use fluorescent lighting. US Representative Noah Mason dedicated the building. A new Washington School was built in 1956 for the junior high student population, and ten years later, the present Belvidere High School was completed. On July 25, 1997, the building complex was recognized by the National Park Service with a listing on the National Register of Historic Places. It received this distinction as a locally significant example of the Classical Revival, Prairie School, and Art Deco styles. The different buildings reflected the changing opinions of school architectural styles.

== Architecture ==
Belvidere High School is located on the northeast cover of Pearl and First Streets. The four-building complex is connected by recent additions, although these connections do not negatively impact the historic integrity of the property. There is no record of an architect for the original 1893 Garfield School. The Garfield School stands two-and-a-half stories with a painted brick exterior. It is built on a coursed, rock face stone foundation and features a full raised basement. The hipped roof was clad with slate shingles. The main entrance was originally on the south facade facing First Street. Some time between 1912 and 1915, an addition was made to the north facade which nearly doubled the size of the structure. At this time, the main entrance to the school was changed to the western elevation. Fireproof stairways were installed in 1919. A two-story addition was completed on the east end in 1936. The Garfield School is in the Classical Revival style.

The 1900 power plant building was built to the northeast of the Garfield School. It is now connected to the 1916 building via an addition in the 1950s or 1960s. The building features of pyramidal hipped roof with a square cupola. A smoke stack rises near the south of the building. The base of the stack is octagonal and built with dark brown brick. The power plant provided heat to the complex.

In 1916, the main Belvidere High School was completed to the north of the 1893 building. This building combined elements of the Classical Revival with the popular Prairie School. The two-story building on a raised basement was built with dark brown brick. The roof is red tile, decorated with a brown terra cotta cornice. Large pilasters decorate the corners with terra cotta capitals and bases. The main entrance is on the west elevation. It is flanked with brick pilasters and sits below a decorative cornice. The original wood doors were replaced by modern aluminum ones in the 1950s or 1960s. Windows were originally double hung and wood sash, but are now mostly smaller one-over-one windows on a fixed panel; a few original windows remain on the north. A brick cafeteria addition was completed in the 1960s.

The 1939 Art Deco addition was built to the east of the 1893 building. The exterior of the building is concrete faced with stucco. Three bays are found on the south elevation and function as the main entrance. A large, recessed elliptical arch features prominently over the entrance. The arch features glass block designs. The center section of the arch had a panel for art glass; the original art has been replaced. The roof is flat.
