= Eldredge (automobile) =

American automobile (1903-1906)

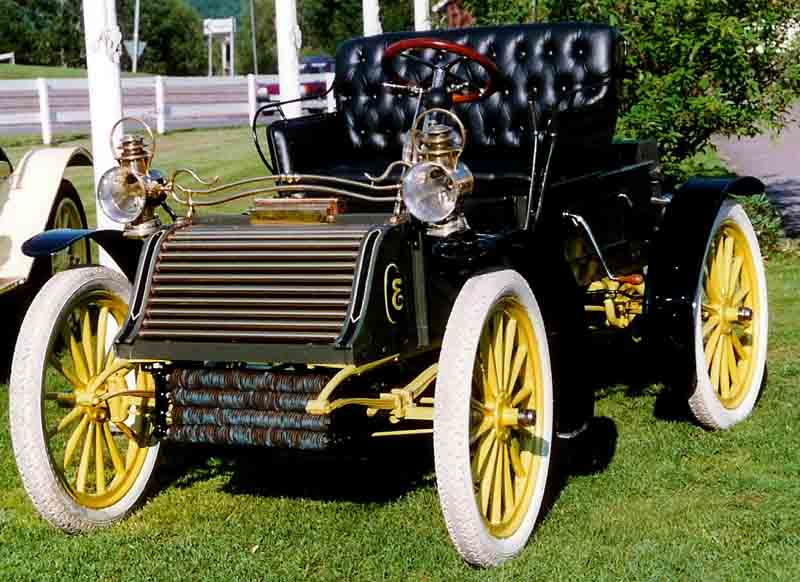
Eldredge Runabout 1904

The Eldredge was an American automobile manufactured from 1903 until 1906. A product of the National Sewing Machine Company of Belvidere, Illinois, it was a light, two-seater runabout with left-hand drive or two-row tonneau.

The 1904 Eldredge Runabout was a runabout model. It could seat two passengers and sold for US$750. The horizontal-mounted flat-twin engine, situated at the center of the car, produced 8 hp (6.0 kW). A 3-speed transmission was fitted. The armored wood-framed car weighed 1,150 lb (520 kg) and used platform springs.

The 1904 Eldredge Tonneau was a tonneau model. It could seat five passengers and sold for $2000. The horizontal-mounted flat-4, situated at the front of the car, produced 16 hp (12 kW). The angle steel-framed car weighed 2,300 lb (1,000 kg). It was a modern touring car design with a cellular radiator (with fan), and semi-elliptic springs, but sold for far less than competing models.
