= Noyes L. Jackson =

American politician

Noyes L. Jackson (July 21, 1860 – January 18, 1933) was an American businessman, farmer, and politician.

Jackson was born in Windham County, Vermont. He moved to Illinois in 1880 and settled in Belvidere, Illinois. He was involved with manufacturing, the fire insurance and the mercantile businesses. He was also a dairy farmer. Jackson served in the Illinois House of Representatives from 1925 to 1931 and was a Republican. Jackson died in Daytona Beach, Florida from a stroke.
