= Debris fallout =

Tornado effect

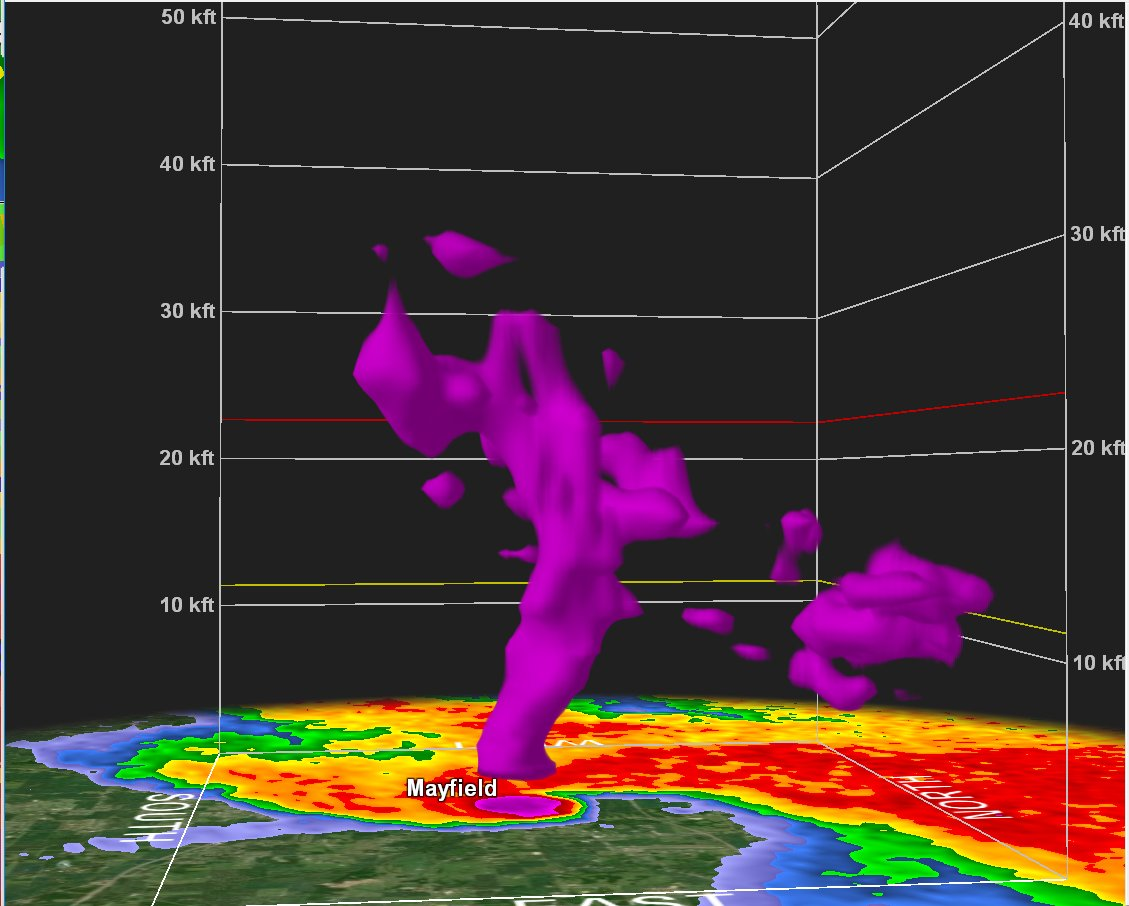
A reflectivity scan reveals a significant volume of lofted debris as high as 30,000 ft (5.7 mi; 9.1 km) during a violent tornado.

Debris fallout refers to debris lofted into the air by a tornado that falls back to the ground, and that can persist well after a tornado has lifted. Debris lofted by stronger tornadoes has been known to travel significant distances, upwards of 200 mi (320 km) on rare occasions. Debris fallout events can be detected on radar using dual polarization products, notably correlation coefficient. Most debris in excess of 1 lb (0.45 kg) is not moved a great distance; however, lighter objects—especially paper goods—can be absorbed by the storm's updraft and moved into its forward-flank downdraft where they can be transported further by non-tornadic downdraft winds.

== Mechanism ==
The basic mechanism of debris fallout is debris lofted by a tornado's updraft winds high into the atmosphere. Charles E. Anderson completed the first study focusing on debris fallout on the F5 1984 Barneveld tornado, which produced a large survey revealing a trail of paper debris as wide as 23 mi (37 km) at 110 mi (180 km) from Barneveld and a roughly 85 mi (137 km) long path of heavy debris (>1 lb (0.45 kg)). A later study focusing on debris fallout discovered that debris from an intense tornado was lofted potentially as high as 12 km (7.5 mi) into the atmosphere over the 15–20 minutes after the tornado striking a location, before debris was moved further into the tornado's forward-flank downdraft. A photograph had been traced and discovered to have an average speed of 18 m/s (40 mph; 65 km/h) over 30 minutes. A 1993 analysis by Thomas P. Grazulis of 12,651 tornadoes found only 86 had reports of debris being transported over 5 mi (8.0 km) from its origin.

The height of a tornado debris signature is positively and non-linearly correlated with the speed of updraft winds, which is likely compounded by fallout. Debris that falls directly over the vortex can result in an increase in the size of the tornado debris signature on radar.

== Examples ==
- 1915 Great Bend tornado – A cancelled check discovered in Palmyra, Nebraska, was traced back to Great Bend, Kansas, a distance of 210 mi (340 km) and, at the time, the greatest distance any debris had been lofted by a tornado.
- 2011 Super Outbreak – A study identified a Facebook page listing over 1700 lost-and-found documents and other light debris from the entire outbreak. Debris was frequently lofted as high as 5.5–6.5 km (3.4–4.0 mi), particularly from the violent (EF4/EF5) tornadoes.
  - 2011 Smithville tornado – A 5 ft (1.5 m) metal sign found in Russellville, Alabama, was traced back to Smithville High School, around 50 mi (80 km) away.
  - 2011 Hackleburg–Phil Campbell tornado – Over half of the debris in the study's database originated from this EF5 tornado in Alabama. A windbreaker weighing over 1 lb (0.45 kg) was lofted 107 km (66 mi) from Hackleburg to Elkmont, and a photograph was lofted from Phil Campbell, Alabama, to Lenoir City, Tennessee, a distance of 353 km (219 mi) and the furthest any individual piece of debris is known to have been lofted.
- 2011 Joplin tornado – A receipt from a tire repair shop in Joplin, Missouri, which was struck by a violent EF5 tornado, was discovered several days later in Royal Center, Indiana, 525 mi (845 km) away. This account is disputed, as it was revealed that the receipt was likely left behind by visiting family members driving from Texas who had stopped in Joplin for repairs.
- 2015 Rochelle–Fairdale tornado – Debris from this tornado was discovered as far away as Racine, Wisconsin, 80 mi (130 km) away. Among the debris was a photo of Geraldine Schultz, alongside her husband Clem Schultz; Geraldine was one of the two people to die in the tornado.
- 2019 Lawrence–Linwood tornado – A 2020 study focusing on this tornado discovered that lofted debris became visible on radar following the tornado reaching violent intensity. Kansas City International Airport had been under a tornado warning, and 16 minutes after the all-clear was lifted, despite being 75 km (47 mi) from the tornado itself, a ground stop was issued as significant volumes of debris was reported on the runway. An airborne debris signature was evident over the airport up to an hour prior to the first reports of debris.
- 2021 Edwardsville tornado – After striking an Amazon warehouse, where six died, a significant amount of debris from the facility was noted by surveyors, being found across the parent supercell's "entire path", which extended through Shelby County, Illinois.
- 2024 Greenfield tornado – Volunteer maize crops began sprouting around Greenfield in July 2024. This was attributed to the EF4 tornado that hit the area months before, which also brought heavy rains that may have incited the growth of the crops.

== See also ==
- Nuclear fallout
- Rain of animals
