= Boone County Courthouse (Illinois) =

Coordinates: 42°15′54″N 88°50′42″W

The Boone County Courthouse, located at 601 N. Main St. in the county seat of Belvidere, is the courthouse of Boone County, Illinois. Its court sessions hear cases in the 17th circuit of Illinois judicial district 4. The oldest section of the Courthouse complex was built in 1854−1855.

In 2009 the county's administrative offices and functions moved from the Courthouse to a separate Belvidere, Illinois building, the Boone County Administration Building.

== History ==
The two principal Boone County governmental buildings in use today were originally built in 1854−1855 (Courthouse) and 2008−2009 (County Administration Building). The Italianate Courthouse, built in the 1850s for $9,000 in the gold-coin money of the day, could house the entire administrative, office, and judicial functions of the county. A neo-Italianate annex was built in 1878 to house the Clerk's office, and a modern structure was built in 1958 to add courthouse footage and join the two older buildings. Further judicial-space renovations took place in 2009.

A County Administration Building, also located in Belvidere but physically separate from the Courthouse on the opposite side of the Kishwaukee River, was built in 2008−2009 as 1212 Logan Avenue. The Administration Building houses the administrative offices of Boone County government.

Prior to the construction of the oldest section of the current Courthouse in 1854−1855, Boone County used a temporary brick structure (built in 1840−1843) until 1853.
