= Belvidere High School (Illinois) =

Location
- 1500 East Avenue; Belvidere, Illinois 61008; United States; 42.2438°N 88.8306°W

Information
- School type: Public Secondary
- School district: Belvidere Community Unit School District 100
- Superintendent: Cassandra Schug
- Principal: Douglas Mitchell
- Teaching staff: 85.00 (FTE)
- Grades: 9–12
- Gender: all
- Enrollment: 1,161 (2023-2024)
- Average class size: 21.4
- Student to teacher ratio: 13.66
- Campus type: Urban
- Colors: Purple; Gold
- Slogan: It's the Year of the BUCS!
- Song: Notre Dame Victory March
- Athletics conference: Northern Illinois Conference (NIC-10)
- Mascot: Buccaneer
- Team name: Bucs
- Newspaper: The Buccaneer'
- Yearbook: Belvi
- Website: Official School Website

Belvidere High School is located in at 1500 East Avenue, Belvidere, Illinois in Boone County. It is a part of the Belvidere Community Unit School District 100.

== History ==
=== 1967 tornado ===
On the afternoon of April 21, 1967, an F4 tornado struck the school, killing 13 students and staff, tossing buses as students were being dismissed. The tornado was part of the 1967 Oak Lawn tornado outbreak. It was the sixth worse loss of life at an American school as a result of tornadoes, and the worst since 1955.

To mark the 50th anniversary of the tragedy, a memorial to the lives lost in the tornado was erected in front of Belvidere High School in 2017.

== Athletics ==
Belvidere competes in the Northern Illinois Conference (NIC-10), and is a member of the Illinois High School Association (IHSA). Teams are stylized as the Bucs (a shortening of Buccaneers).

BHS Sports: Football, Poms, Cheerleading, Basketball, Dance, Baseball, Tennis, Bowling, Track & Field, Soccer, Softball, Golf, Volleyball, Swimming, and Cross Country.

The school won back–to–back state championships in football in the autumns of 1993 and 1994.

== Notable alumni ==
- Jeanne Gang ’82, award-winning architect, founder of Studio Gang Architects, and designer of the world's two tallest skyscrapers designed by a woman, Aqua and the St. Regis Chicago
- William James Hurlbut, artist, playwright, and screenwriter
- Bessie Leach Priddy, educator, social reformer, clubwoman, and leader of the Delta Delta Delta women's fraternity
