= Nihon Dempa Kogyo =

Japanese electronic components manufacturing company

Nihon Dempa Kogyo Co., Ltd.
- Native name: 日本電波工業株式会社
- Company type: Public (K.K)
- Traded as: TYO: 6779
- ISIN: JP3737800007
- Industry: Electronics
- Founded: April 1948; 78 years ago
- Headquarters: Sasazuka, Shibuya-ku, Tokyo 151-8569, Japan
- Key people: Toshiaki Takeuchi (Chairman of the Board, President and CEO)
- Products: Crystal oscillators; Artificial crystals; Crystal blanks
- Revenue: ▲JPY 42.4 billion (FY 2018) (US$ 386 million)
- Net income: ▼JPY -251 million (FY 2018) (US$ -2.2 million)
- Number of employees: 3,419 (consolidated, as of September 30, 2018)
- Website: Official website

Nihon Dempa Kogyo Co., Ltd. or NDK (日本電波工業株式会社, Nihon Dempa Kogyo Kabushiki-gaisha) is one of the world's largest quartz crystal companies, based in Shibuya, Tokyo, Japan.

Using its synthetic quartz crystals, NDK produces crystal-related products such as crystal devices (e.g. crystal units, crystal oscillators, crystal filters) and ultrasonic transducers for medical use. In recent years, the company has begun to develop frequency synthesizers and low-power wireless modules.

== History ==
- 1948 : NDK was established.
- 1950 : Started crystal unit production and sales.
- 1958 : Succeeded in test production of synthetic quartz crystal.
- 1959 : Started crystal filter production.
- 1960 : Started crystal oscillator production.
- 1963 : Began trading of NDK stock on the OTC market.
- 1979 : Developed and industrialized surface acoustic wave (SAW) filter.
- 1990 : Listed NDK stock on Second Section of the Tokyo Stock Exchange.
- 1998 : Listed on the First Section of the Tokyo Stock Exchange.
- 2009 : Pressure vessel in USA plant exploded due to lack of inspections or maintenance on the unfounded presumption that the chemical reaction would form a protective anti-corrosion layer within the tank, killing a truck driver at a gas station across the street with flying debris. The blast blew out windows and crashed an 4-ton vessel fragment into a nearby automotive supply company, injuring 1. NDK's insurance carrier had repeatedly warned NDK that the pressure vessel was unsafe, including to the gas station where the fatality occurred, but NDK failed to take any safety measures.
- 2010: Fined $510K by OSHA for safety violations.
- 2015 : USA plant demolished, with no plans to rebuild.

== Products ==
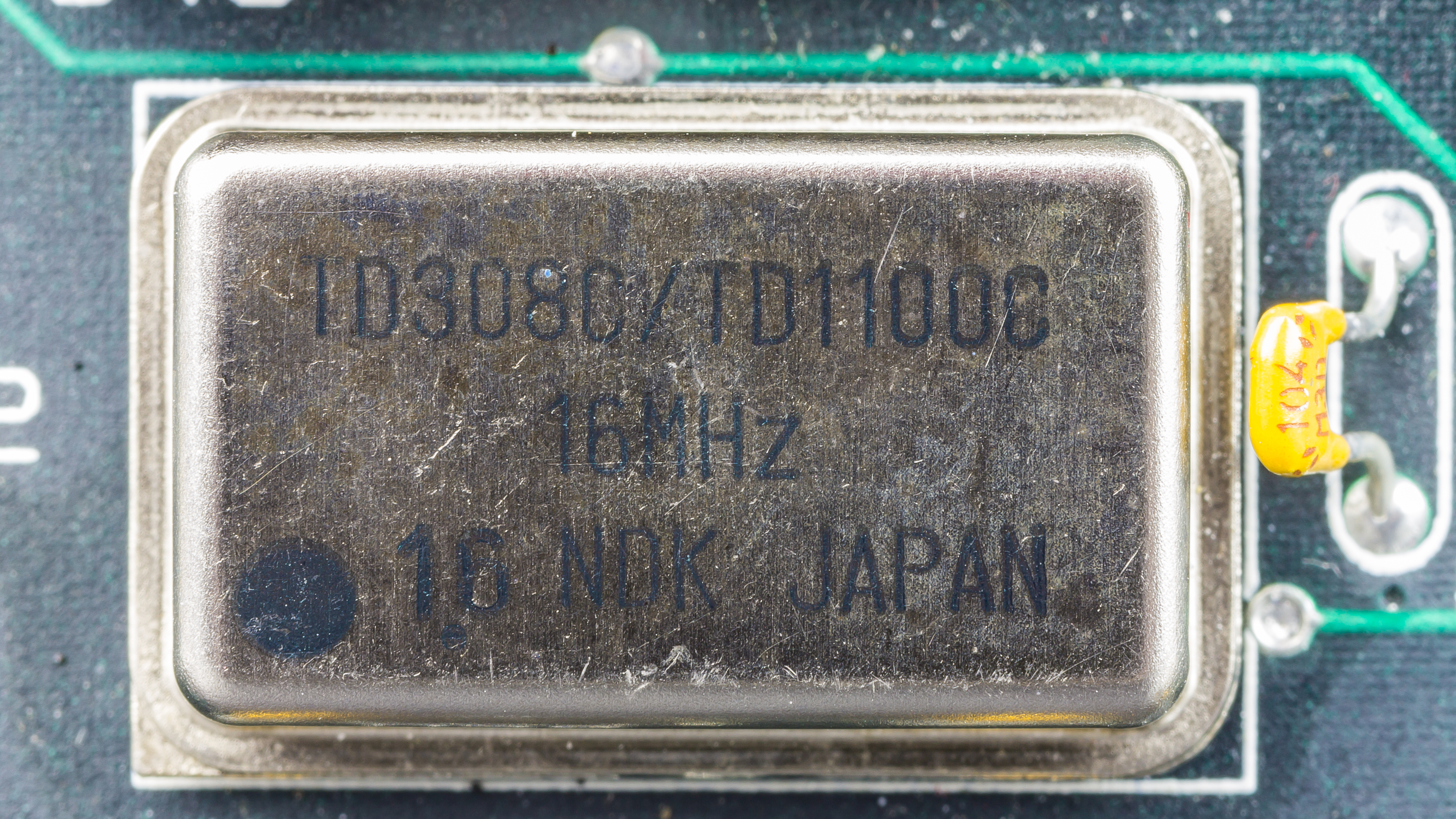
- Crystal Clock Oscillator NDK TD308C/TD1100C
  Crystal Units
- Crystal Oscillators
  - SPXO
  - TCXO
  - VCXO
  - OCXO
- Crystal Filters
- Surface Acoustic Wave (SAW) Devices
- Optical Components
- Synthetic Quartz Crystals
- Ultrasonic Transducers
- Frequency Synthesizers

=== Research and product development ===
Nihon Dempa Kogyo has developed a prototype crystal-based disease detector which diagnoses disease from breath. The system works by detecting trace amounts of odor-causing substances found in a person's breath.

== Company locations ==
NDK has sales offices in Japan, China, France, Germany, Italy, Malaysia, Singapore, United Kingdom, and United States. NDK has production and engineering facilities in Japan, China, Germany, Malaysia, and the United States.

== 2009 Explosion ==
NDK's Belvidere, Illinois facility was heavily damaged in 2009 when one of the crystal autoclaves ruptured violently, causing an explosion. The explosion scattered debris over a wide area, with a 7-foot support beam striking and killing Ronald Greenfield of Chesterfield, Indiana, who was refueling at a nearby truck stop. Debris also damaged a nearby automotive supply company, injuring one worker. The rupture was in a crystal-growth autoclave that had undergone stress corrosion cracking and was inadequately inspected; recommendations from a previous incident were ignored. As a result, the autoclave became overstressed and failed completely. After an investigation, OSHA fined NDK $510,000 for a history of ignoring safety recommendations.

Demolition of the facility began in March 2015, with no plans to rebuild.

The U.S. Chemical Safety Board investigated the incident and published a video titled "Falling Through the Cracks."
