= National Sewing Machine Company =

National Sewing Machine Company was a Belvidere, Illinois-based manufacturer founded in the late 19th century, operating until 1957. The company manufactured sewing machines, washing machines, bicycles, an automobile, home workshop machinery, and cast-iron toys and novelties (under the Vindex Toy Company label).

== History ==
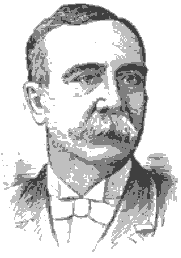
Barnabas Eldredge (1843–1911)

Barnabas Eldredge was an industrialist connected with the Ames Manufacturing Company of Chicopee, Massachusetts, a firearms manufacturer that also produced sewing machines with Eldredge. Ames sold off its sewing machine dies and equipment to Eldredge, who went to Chicago. There he joined forces with the existing June Manufacturing Company, founded in 1879 by F. T. June, which already produced the "Jennie June" sewing machine, which was then eventually replaced by a better model designed by Eldredge. Eldredge took over the company in 1890 on the death of June, renaming it National Sewing Machine.

Eldredge led the company until his death in 1911. He was succeeded by David Patton.

Harold D. Neff headed up the Vindex toy division between 1916 and 1951; Vindex was the name of a product line of National's washing machines. National Sewing Machine Company and Farm Mechanics magazine partnered up, with the magazine offering Vindex toys as incentives to children to sell magazine subscriptions.

In 1953 National merged with the Free Sewing Machine Company but was unable to compete with the imported Japanese sewing machine models and the National Sewing Machine Company closed in 1957

== Products ==
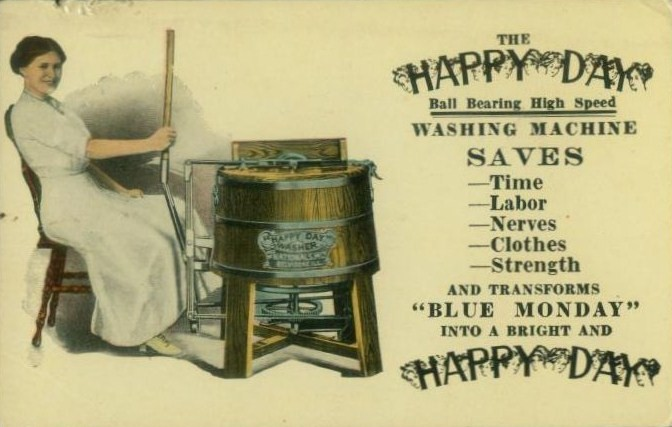
National Sewing Machine Company's "Happy Day" washing machine, circa 1910

- Sewing machines
- Washing machines
- Bicycles
- Eldredge (automobile)
- Cast-iron scale models
  - Cars from Oldsmobile and Pontiac
  - Harley-Davidson motorcycles
  - A power shovel
  - Farm machinery from John Deere, Case, and Van Brunt
  - Horse-drawn wagons
- Book-ends
- Table lamps
- Dog door stops
- Banks (dog and owl)
- Cigarette lighters (bulldog)
- Home workshop machinery
- Vises
- Food grinders

== See also ==
- List of sewing machine brands
