= Belvidere, Illinois =

- City
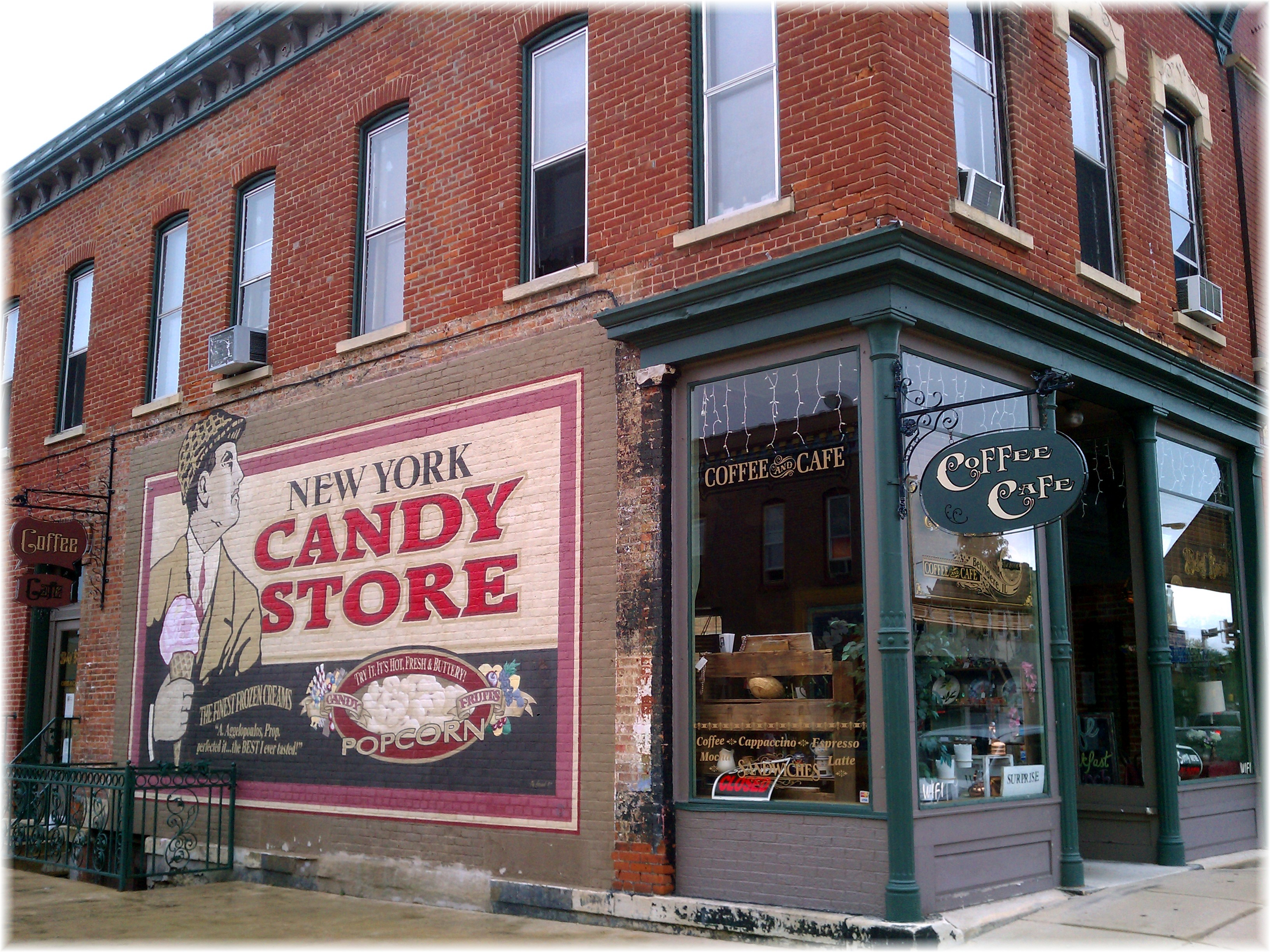
- A mural in the South State Street Historic District

- Flag Seal
- Nickname: Illinois' City of Murals
- Interactive map of Belvidere, Illinois
- Location within Illinois Location within the United States
- Coordinates: 42°15′24″N 88°50′26″W
- Country: US
- State: Illinois
- County: Boone
- Townships: Belvidere, Flora, Bonus, Spring
- Established: 1881

Government
  - Mayor: Clint Morris

Area
  - Total: 12.38 sq mi (32.06 km^{2})
  - Land: 12.14 sq mi (31.44 km^{2})
  - Water: 0.24 sq mi (0.61 km^{2})
- Elevation: 794 ft (242 m)

Population (2020)
  - Total: 25,339
  - Estimate (2024): 25,325 ▼
  - Density: 2,087/sq mi (805.9/km^{2})
- Time zone: UTC−6 (CST)
  - Summer (DST): UTC−5 (CDT)
- ZIP code: 61008
- Area code: 815
- FIPS code: 17-05092
- Website: City of Belvidere Website

Belvidere (/ˈbɛlvɪdɪər/) is a city in and the county seat of Boone County, Illinois, United States. It is settled on the Kishwaukee River in far northern Illinois. The population was 25,339 at the 2020 census. Belvidere is part of the Rockford metropolitan area.

Known as the "City of Murals", Belvidere is home to several public art installations throughout the North and South State Street historic districts, which are on the National Register of Historic Places. These historic districts are home to the Boone County Museum of History, the Funderburg House Museum, several restaurants and bars, and antique and boutique stores. Popular festivities like Heritage Days are held yearly.

== History ==
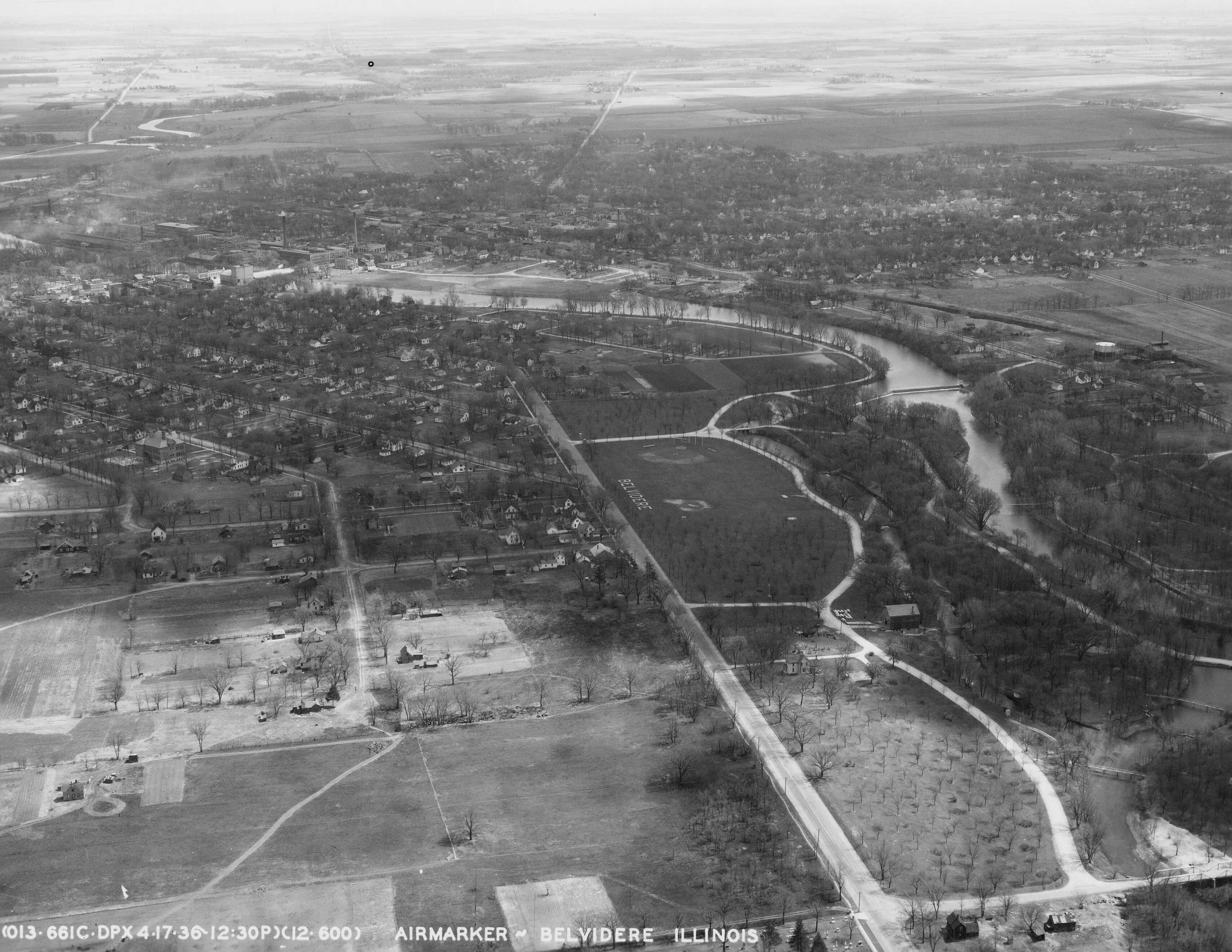
Belvidere, 1936

Before the arrival of the mostly Anglo-Americans in the 19th century, this area was long occupied by the Illinois Confederation, a loose grouping of up to 12 to 15 Native American tribes. The main tribes were the Cahokia, Kaskaskia, Michigamea, Peoria, and Tamaroa. After trading, warfare and other encounters with French traders, who entered this area before the Anglo-Americans, their numbers declined. In large part due to the high mortality from new infectious diseases, which adversely affected Native Americans across the continent.

The area developed as Belvidere was first settled by European Americans in 1835: Simon P. Doty and Daniel Hilton Whitney. They named this location next to the Kishwaukee River as "Elysian Fields" from Greek mythology. Because new residents could not pronounce or spell the proposed name, the city was eventually renamed after Belvidere, Virginia, the former home of Ebenezer Polk, a railroad lawyer and major financial founder in the city.

Belvidere originally developed on the north side of the Kishwaukee River. In 1851 the Galena and Chicago Union Railroad was built south of the river, stimulating the relocation of much of the business section to the south side of the river, giving access to railway transportation. Belvidere's downtown is now on the south side.

Major industries developed along the river and railroad, including the National Sewing Machine Company, which operated here from 1886 to the 1940s. In 1906, former female sheriff Sarah Ames moved to South Dakota; she named the area where she settled after her home town. Belvidere, South Dakota still operates as a small town in Jackson County.

=== 1967 tornado ===
On April 21, 1967, a devastating tornado struck Belvidere. Twenty-four people died as a result, many of them schoolchildren. The F4 tornado struck at the end of the school day of Belvidere High School, when many children, including those who attended area grade schools, were waiting outside the high school for school buses. Of the sixteen school buses outside the high school, twelve were overturned or thrown by the tornado. The tornado did $22 million in damage, demolished over 100 homes, and injured 500 people. In 2007 a statue was erected in front of Belvidere High School in memorial of the lives lost.

As of 2013, the Belvidere tornado was the sixth worst weather disaster to happen at an American school, and the deadliest since 1955.

=== 2009 explosion ===
On December 7, 2009, an explosion occurred at an NDK America building, when a large pressure vessel ruptured during a crystal-growing process. Pieces of debris, some weighing several tons, were flung over a wide area. One piece struck an automotive supply building and injured an employee inside. Chesterfield, Indiana native Ronald Greenfield, a truck driver refueling at the nearby Belvidere Oasis truck stop, was struck and killed by a 7-foot support beam. The shockwave was felt over a wide area. No NDK employees were injured in the incident.

The Chemical Safety Board investigated the incident, issuing their final report in 2013. The CSB found that stress corrosion cracking had occurred, unnoticed, in one of the crystal-growing autoclaves, leading to the catastrophic failure. They also found that NDK management had been warned multiple times over the years that the dangerous levels of hot sodium hydroxide inside the vessels would corrode the steel walls. However, NDK management insisted buildup of byproducts from the crystal-growing process would passivate the vessel walls against the corrosion. Furthermore, during the factory's construction, the local government had been made aware that NDK's crystal-growing vessels were in violation of several state codes; when confronted, NDK had persuaded them to grant a special exception, and to hitherto allow them to conduct their own onsite inspections without outside interference. However, the vessel that ruptured had never been internally inspected to test the passivation theory, during its many years of service. After a smaller leak occurred in January 2007, NDK was warned about safety concerns again, this time by insurance investigators, who were ultimately ignored. Finally, the CSB determined the method for growing crystals used at NDK's Belvidere facility was prohibitively dangerous in the first place, pointing out such methods had been already abandoned by other crystal-growing facilities in favor of safer, lower-pressure and lower temperature processes.

Following their own 2010 investigation, the Occupational Safety and Health Administration fined NDK more than half a million dollars for willful disregard for legal requirements, and "unacceptable" indifference to safety and health. The NDK facility was demolished in 2015, with no plans to rebuild.

=== 2023 tornado ===
On March 31, 2023, an EF1 tornado struck Belvidere. It caused the Apollo Theatre to collapse during a concert for the Floridian Death Metal band Morbid Angel and Brazilian Death Metal band Crypta. The concert proceeded despite advanced notice of severe conditions expected that day. The collapse led to over 40 injuries; leaving at least four in critical condition and one fatality.

== Geography ==
According to the 2021 census gazetteer files, Belvidere has a total area of 12.30 square miles (31.86 km^{2}), of which 12.06 square miles (31.24 km^{2}) (or 98.08%) is land and 0.24 square miles (0.62 km^{2}) (or 1.92%) is water.

Located in north central Illinois, in a county on the northern border of the state, Belvidere is approximately 75 miles (121 km) northwest of the downtown of Chicago, and approximately 12 miles (19 km) east of Rockford.

Belvidere developed on both sides of the Kishwaukee River in north central Illinois. It is 76 miles from downtown Chicago via Routes 20, 76 and the Northern Illinois Toll road. Belvidere is an industrial community surrounded by prosperous farms. It is the county seat, with an estimated 2006 county population of over 52,000. The altitude is 800 feet above sea level, with average temperatures of: 73 degrees F in the summer; 24 degrees F in the winter, and the average rainfall is 33.3 inches, and the average annual snowfall is 35.3 inches.

== Demographics ==
Historical population
Census	Pop.	Note	%±
1850	1,003		—
1860	2,446		143.9%
1870	3,231		32.1%
1880	2,951		−8.7%
1890	3,867		31.0%
1900	6,937		79.4%
1910	7,253		4.6%
1920	7,804		7.6%
1930	8,123		4.1%
1940	8,094		−0.4%
1950	9,422		16.4%
1960	11,223		19.1%
1970	14,061		25.3%
1980	15,176		7.9%
1990	15,958		5.2%
2000	20,820		30.5%
2010	25,585		22.9%
2020	25,339		−1.0%
U.S. Decennial Census; 2010 2020

=== Racial and ethnic composition ===
Belvidere city, Illinois – Racial and ethnic composition Note: the US Census treats Hispanic/Latino as an ethnic category. This table excludes Latinos from the racial categories and assigns them to a separate category. Hispanics/Latinos may be of any race.
Race / Ethnicity (NH = Non-Hispanic)	Pop 2000	Pop 2010	Pop 2020	% 2000	% 2010	% 2020
White alone (NH)	16,063	16,527	14,296	77.15%	64.60%	56.42%
Black or African American alone (NH)	217	599	706	1.04%	2.34%	2.79%
Native American or Alaska Native alone (NH)	43	35	39	0.21%	0.14%	0.15%
Asian alone (NH)	89	243	259	0.43%	0.95%	1.02%
Native Hawaiian or Pacific Islander alone (NH)	3	0	4	0.01%	0.00%	0.02%
Other race alone (NH)	10	23	86	0.05%	0.09%	0.34%
Mixed race or Multiracial (NH)	216	320	850	1.04%	1.25%	3.35%
Hispanic or Latino (any race)	4,179	7,838	9,099	20.07%	30.64%	35.91%
Total	20,820	25,585	25,339	100.00%	100.00%	100.00%

=== 2020 census ===
As of the 2020 census, Belvidere had a population of 25,339. The median age was 37.0 years. 25.7% of residents were under the age of 18 and 14.5% of residents were 65 years of age or older. For every 100 females there were 96.5 males, and for every 100 females age 18 and over there were 93.4 males.

98.6% of residents lived in urban areas, while 1.4% lived in rural areas.

There were 9,113 households and 5,891 families in the city; 36.1% had children under the age of 18 living in them. Of all households, 46.0% were married-couple households, 18.1% were households with a male householder and no spouse or partner present, and 27.9% were households with a female householder and no spouse or partner present. About 26.7% of all households were made up of individuals and 12.4% had someone living alone who was 65 years of age or older.

There were 9,609 housing units, of which 5.2% were vacant. The homeowner vacancy rate was 1.6% and the rental vacancy rate was 6.7%. The population density was 2,060.08 inhabitants per square mile (795.40/km^{2}) and the housing unit density was 781.22 per square mile (301.63/km^{2}).

Racial composition as of the 2020 census
Race	Number	Percent
White	15,650	61.8%
Black or African American	759	3.0%
American Indian and Alaska Native	374	1.5%
Asian	276	1.1%
Native Hawaiian and Other Pacific Islander	17	0.1%
Some other race	4,598	18.1%
Two or more races	3,665	14.5%

=== Income ===
The median income for a household in the city was $52,609, and the median income for a family was $67,518. Males had a median income of $34,455 versus $27,676 for females. The per capita income for the city was $24,330. About 8.9% of families and 13.5% of the population were below the poverty line, including 18.7% of those under age 18 and 9.7% of those age 65 or over.

== Economy ==
Stellantis operates the Belvidere Assembly Plant, an auto assembly plant, which was constructed in the mid-1960s. The Belvidere plant manufactured the Dodge Neon until the spring of 2005. In the late 1960s and early 1970s, the plant manufactured Chrysler Newports and Plymouth Furys. After a massive restructuring of the Belvidere plant, it is now one of the most modern auto assembly plants in the United States. It most recently assembled the Jeep Cherokee until February 2023, when the plant was idled indefinitely by Stellantis. As part of the settlement of the 2023 United Auto Workers strike, Stellantis agreed to reopen the plant in 2025, to construct a mid-size Ram pickup. An electric vehicle battery plant will also be constructed. The site was visited by US President Joe Biden and UAW President Shawn Fain.

Dean Foods and General Mills operate manufacturing plants on the bank of the Kishwaukee River. General Mills recently announced a large expansion in the area, soon to begin construction on a 1.3 million square foot distribution center in a newly annexed southwestern portion of the city.

On March 30th, 2022 Rock Valley College opened their new 9+ million dollar Advanced Technology Center in the northwestern portion of Belvidere, after competition among several area cities for the Advanced Technology Center.

"Project Yukon" is a cold storage facility announced by Walmart on 6/20/2023, which will be over 1.2 million square feet on 200 acres in the Southwest side of the city. This is expected to bring up to 700 jobs; as of 5/16/2026 construction is underway with a completion goal in 2027.

== Culture ==
Pettit Memorial Chapel, designed by Frank Lloyd Wright; the Lampert-Wildflower House, and the Belvidere Post Office, designed by James Knox Taylor, are listed on the National Register of Historic Places.

Parks include Spencer Park, Belvidere Municipal Park, and the Boone County Fairgrounds. Belvidere is known as the "City of Murals", for its numerous murals.

== Education ==
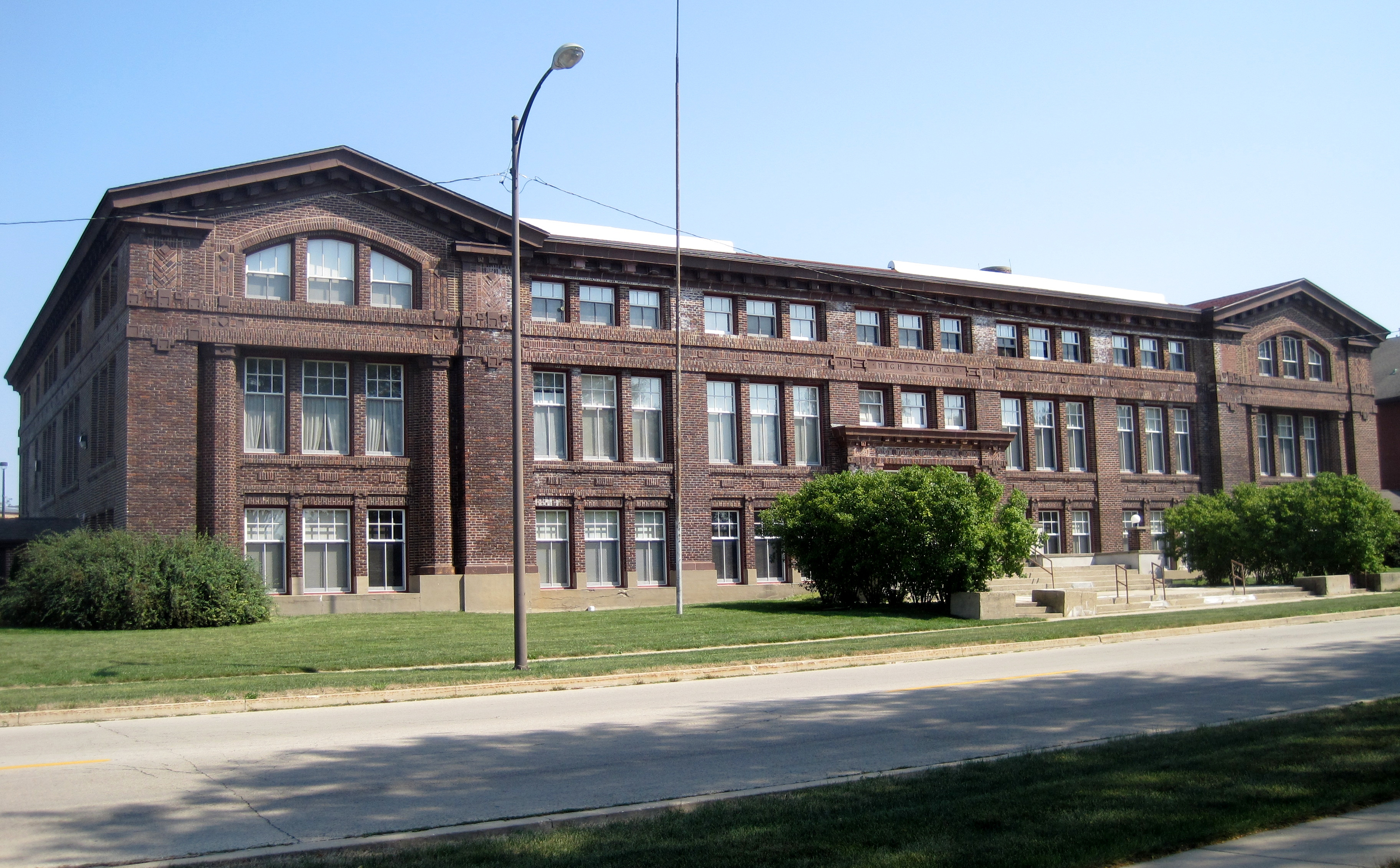
The Old Belvidere High School complex consists of four buildings constructed between 1893 and 1939.

It is in the Belvidere Community Unit School District 100. Schools operated by the district include two high schools, Belvidere High School and Belvidere North High School, the Everest Alternative Program, two middle schools, Belvidere South Middle School and Belvidere Central Middle School, five elementary schools, Lincoln Elementary School, Perry Elementary School, Meehan Elementary School, Caledonia Elementary School, and Seth Whitman Elementary School, one STEM academy, Washington Academy.

Belvidere's public library, Ida Public Library, was founded in 1883. The current building, a Carnegie Library, was constructed in 1912 and opened in 1913. An addition was built in 1987. It includes adult and children services, a Local History and Genealogy Room, and Internet/computer access.

The Boone County Museum of History was started in 1936 and holds over 100,000 artifacts. It has interactive displays and a research library, with more than 5000 document resources. The three-story building is located in downtown Belvidere.

== Infrastructure ==
RMTD provides bus service on Route 24 connecting Belvidere to Rockford.

Belvedere is served by the old Chicago & North Western line to Rockford (present day Union Pacific). The line opened from Marengo to Rockford in 1852. There were also connecting lines to Spring Valley and Janesville. The line to Rockford previously extended to Freeport.

Rail service is scheduled to resume in Belvidere in 2027 as part of the Rockford Intercity Passenger Rail project connecting Rockford to Chicago. The twice-daily route will be operated by Metra.

=== Services ===
Belvidere used to have two hospitals, St. Joseph Hospital and Highland Hospital. Both closed in the late 20th century, with St. Joseph's closing in 1999. In 2008, SwedishAmerican Hospital opened a new building. In 2009, they renovated and reopened the former Highland Hospital, which now operates the city's only emergency department.

Cemeteries include the Belvidere Cemetery (Richard S. Molony's interment site) and St. James Catholic Cemetery.

The nearest general aviation airport is Poplar Grove Airport, formerly known as Belvidere Airport.

Belvidere Fire Department has 2 Fire Stations, and 1 Ambulance station. These 3 Stations have 42 Full Working staff.

== Notable people ==
- Frank Bishop, infielder for the Chicago Browns
- Emory S. Bogardus, sociologist
- Joe Charboneau, outfielder and designated hitter for the Cleveland Indians
- Judith Ford, 1969 Miss America
- Charles Eugene Fuller, U.S. Congressman
- Jeanne Gang award-winning architect, founder of Studio Gang Architects
- Stephen Augustus Hurlbut (1815–1882), politician and Union commander in the Civil War
- Noyes L. Jackson, Illinois politician
- Lowell Holden Parker, Wisconsin legislator
- Bessie Leach Priddy, educator, social reformer and clubwoman
- Amanda Levens, women's college basketball player and coach
- Fred Schulte, outfielder for numerous teams
- Kurt Sellers, wrestler with the WWE
- James A. Slater, entomologist at the University of Connecticut
- Roger Charles Sullivan, Illinois politician
- Scott Taylor, professional off-road racing driver
- James Waddington, Wisconsin State Senator
- Ronald A. Wait, Illinois State Representative
