= 1967 Oak Lawn tornado =

F4 tornado in Chicago, Illinois during 1967

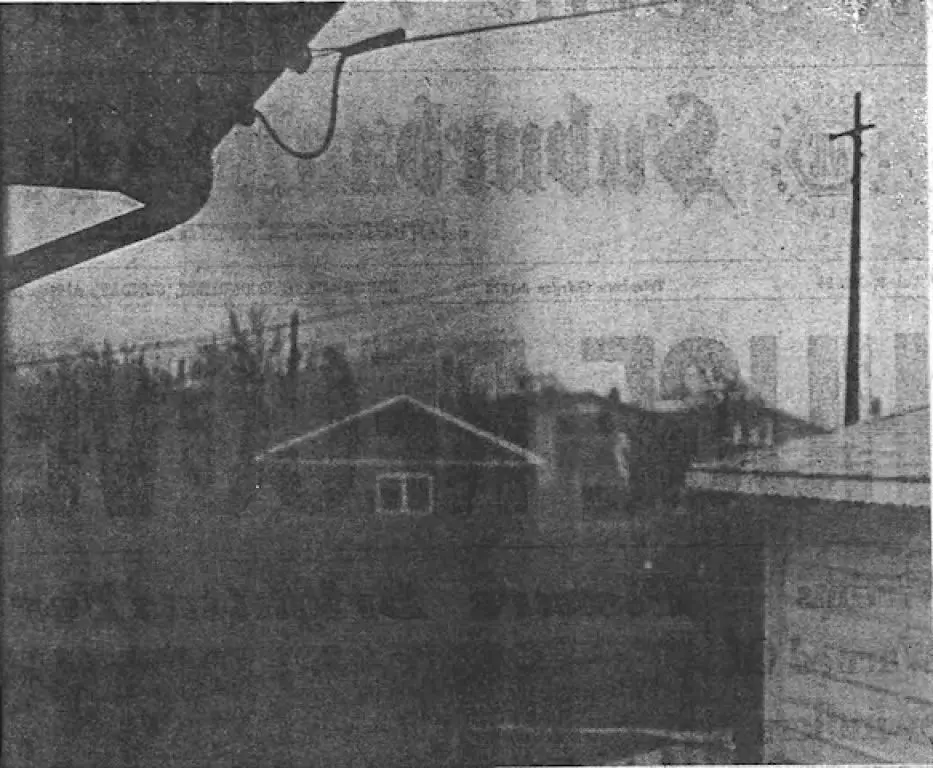
- The tornado shortly after formation, tracking through Oak Lawn

Meteorological history
- Formed: April 21, 1967, 5:24 p.m. CDT (UTC−05:00)
- Dissipated: April 21, 1967, 5:39 p.m. CDT (UTC−05:00)
- Duration: 15 minutes

F4 tornado
- on the Fujita scale
- Highest winds: 250 mph (400 km/h)

Overall effects
- Fatalities: 33
- Injuries: 500–1,000 Injury estimates: 500 - Per the National Weather Service; 1,000 – Per Suburban Chicagoland
- Areas affected: Cook County, Illinois
- Part of the 1967 Oak Lawn tornado outbreak and tornadoes of 1967

In the evening hours of April 21, 1967, a destructive tornado moved through several suburbs of Chicago, Illinois, killing 33 and injuring over 500 more. The tornado was commonly known as the Oak Lawn Tornado of 1967.

== Meteorological synopsis ==
Prior to the event, the U.S. Weather Bureau issued a tornado watch, warning that many tornadoes could possibly hit Northern Illinois.

== Tornado summary ==
The tornado first produced damage to a restaurant located on McCarthy Road in the Lemont area, where the building's windows were blown out. Shortly after, a witness to the tornado on Willow Springs Road noted a funnel to the National Weather Service in Chicago, Illinois, marking the first time the tornado was reported on the ground by a member of the public. The funnel visibly condensed along 88th Avenue at 5:24 p.m., destroying trees and dislodging chunks of mud from the ground. Homes were first damaged on 83rd Avenue and the tornado impacted more residential areas in the Harlem Avenue area. In this area, the tornado lofted a well-built home 60 feet (18 m) in the air and destroyed two other homes on Sayre Avenue. In Chicago Ridge, the tornado inflicted severe damage to structures and impacted a Starlite Drive-In Theatre, blowing down the screen and bending the steel supports used to hold the screen up.

=== Track through Oak Lawn area ===
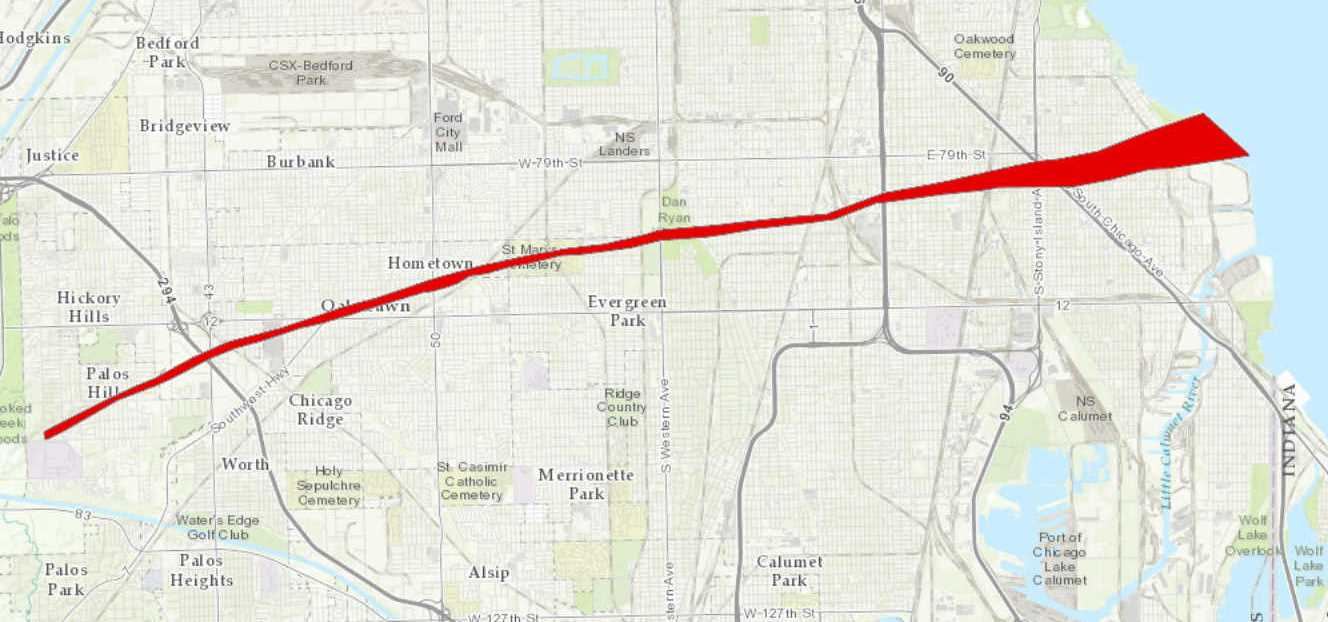
Damage track of the tornado (highlighted in red)

The tornado continued to move to the northeast as it entered into central portions of Oak Lawn, growing to one city block in width. In a damage analysis produced following the event, the National Weather Service called the damage in this area "terrific". Brick homes were destroyed in the tornadic winds and 40 vehicles sitting at an intersection were set aloft by the tornado, several being dropped on the Oak Lawn athletic field. At 5:28 p.m. the tornado impacted the southern portions of the Oak Lawn Community High School and picked up school buses, one landing on a home. The tornado narrowed as it continued along its path, thinning to less than one city block wide before rapidly widening and intensifying as it struck Cicero Avenue. The tornado caused fatalities at a roller rink on 92nd Street adjacent to Cicero Avenue; the rink was destroyed.

=== Hometown and Evergreen Park ===
In Hometown, the tornado destroyed several homes and damaged the city hall, stopping a clock in the building that displayed as “5:29 p.m.”, the time of impact. A multi-story building located at 8900 Crawford Avenue was obliterated and a steel fence located on the same street was destroyed. The tornado destroyed over 200 headstones and other statues as it moved over the St. Mary’s Cemetery; a two-story brick building on the opposite side of the cemetery was destroyed. The tornado briefly paralleled the Great Western Railroad as it continued to track in a northeastward motion before striking another cemetery. At this point along its track, the tornado was moving to the east at forward speeds of over 60 miles per hour (97 km/h).

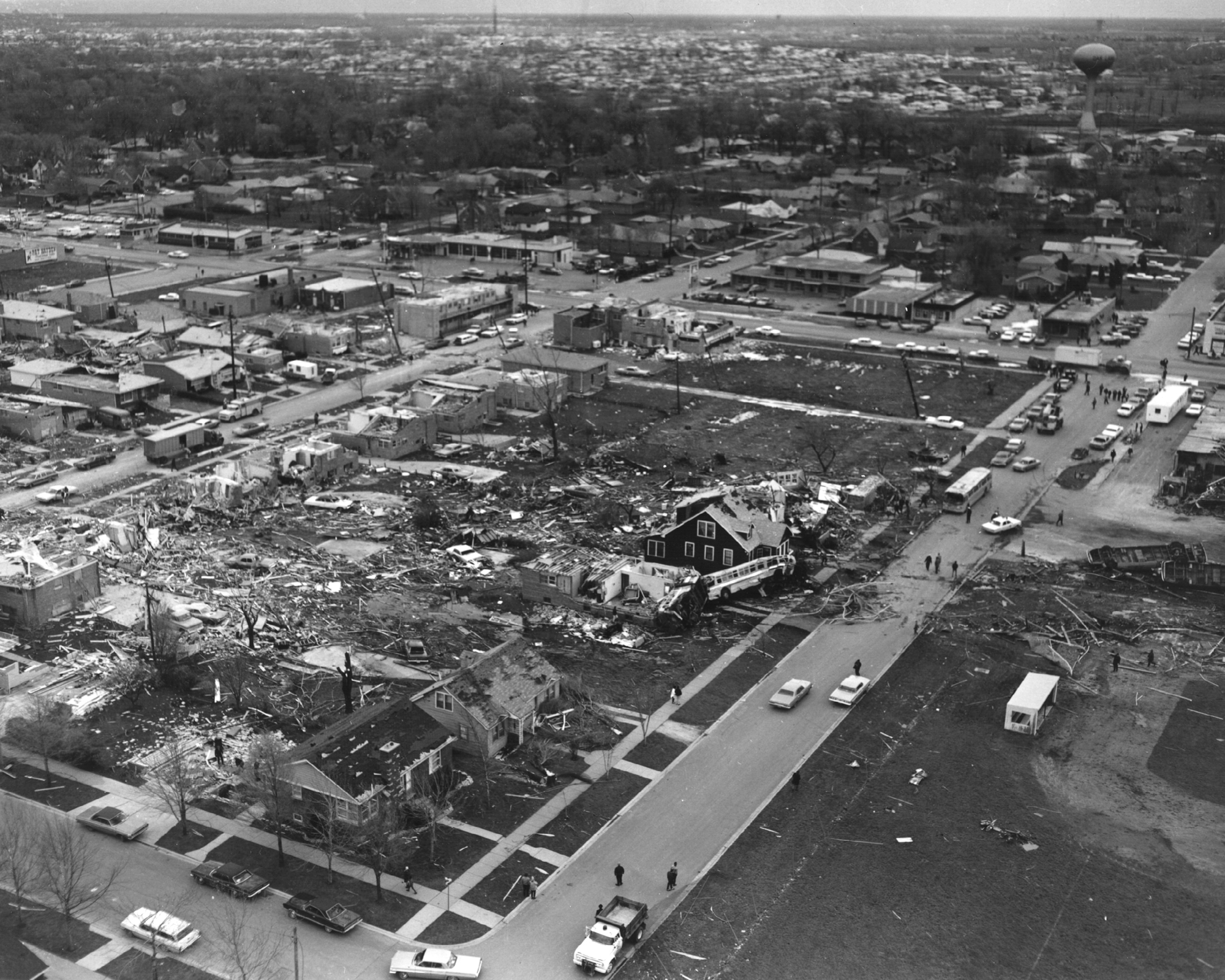
Damage along 95th Street and the Southwest Highway

On Kedzie Avenue, the tornado produced heavy damage to buildings, before continuing into Evergreen Park. The tornado deroofed buildings and collapsed the walls of homes as it moved over the intersection of 88th Street and Francisco Avenue before widening, reaching almost one block in width while inflicting heavy structural damage to stores on Washtenan Avenue through the Ohio Railroad tracks. Several people along this portion of the tornado’s track took heed of the warning and moved to shelter before the tornado hit. At the intersection of Ciero Avenue and 87th Street, a photograph of the large tornado was taken.

The tornado downed trees in the Dan Ryan Woods neighborhood, hitting homes on Damen Avenue and shattering windows. The condensation funnel lifted around the 86th Street area, narrowing to one-half of a city block in width, damaging garages and deroofing structures. Signs along Ashland Avenue were blown off their posts by the tornado; at this point it had begun to move in an eastward direction. Two exterior walls of a brick factory on 84th Street were blown out by the tornadic winds and several other structures sustained wall damage on Vincennes and Wentworth Avenues. To the east, newer homes were destroyed and large amounts of debris were picked up and fell onto the Dan Ryan Expressway, closing the highway for several hours.

At around this time, the tornado moved parallel to the Illinois Central railroad, visible to witnesses at treetop level. The tornado damaged brick buildings and chimneys as it tracked through a residential area at relatively weak intensity. The tornado then passed over a filtration plant on 78th Street near Lake Michigan, where an anemometer measured a wind gust that exceeded 100 miles per hour (160 km/h). In the parking lot of the plant, the tornado broke vehicle windshields. Shortly after, the tornado lifted. It was on the ground for 16.2 miles (26.1 km), killing 33 people and injuring at least 500 others.

== Aftermath ==
=== Casualties ===
The tornado was the deadliest in the history of greater Chicago, and one of the worst to ever strike the region.

| Name | Age | Location | Ref. |
|---|---|---|---|
| Albert Semaitis | 42 | Evergreen Park | |
| Charlotte Hanley | 50 | La Grange | |
| Patrick Golden | 39 | Oak Lawn | |
| John Mobley | 46 | Oak Lawn | |
| Edward Griffith | 45 | Oak Lawn | |
| Edward Lipski | 51 | Oak Lawn | |
| Patrick Calascibetta | 46 | Oak Lawn | |
| William Hunoway | 47 | Oak Lawn | |
| Edward Burmon | 65 | Oak Lawn | |
| William Welser | 35 | Oak Lawn | |
| Bernard Brady | 43 | Oak Lawn | |
| Bernadette Brady | 8 | Oak Lawn | |
| Bernice Andrews | 25 | Oak Lawn | |
| William Jackson | 51 | Oak Lawn | |
| Catherine Zenner | 15 | Oak Lawn | |
| John Haggan | 51 | Oak Lawn | |
| David Nork | 14 | Oak Lawn | |
| Helen Atchley | 81 | Oak Lawn | |
| Carole Jucius | 22 | Oak Lawn | |
| Joan Casey | 30 | Oak Lawn | |
| Christine Casey | 1 | Oak Lawn | |
| Charles McNeill | 65 | Oak Lawn | |
| Ernie Gunnarson | 59 | Oak Lawn | |
| Karleen Gunnarson | 53 | Oak Lawn | |
| Harold Cody | 70 | Oak Lawn | |
| Marjorie Swanson | 40 | Oak Lawn | |
| Walter John | 60 | Oak Lawn | |
| John Martin | 23 | Oak Lawn | |
| Grant Miller | 32 | Oak Lawn | |
| Albert Kriscunas | 42 | Palos Heights | |
| Edward Nykeil | 54 | Summit | |
| Christine Hinds | 13 | Worth | |
| Annette Clark | 21 | Worth | |

=== Damage ===
The tornado damaged over 100 homes in the Oak Lawn area,

== Legacy ==
40 years after the event, students at the Oak Lawn Community High School designed a sculpture to commemorate the tornado.

== See also ==
- 1967 Belvidere tornado
- 1928 Rockford tornado

== Sources ==
- Feris, Charles; Vermoch, James; Yario, Henry. "The Oak Lawn Tornado" (PDF). National Weather Service.

=== Further reading ===
- Montesano, Jacob (April 2021). "An analysis of the Oak Lawn Tornado of 1967". Northern Illinois University.
