= Ozinga =

Ozinga is a surname. Notable people with the surname include:

- Frank M. Ozinga (1914–1987), American lawyer and politician
- Saskia Ozinga (born 1960), Dutch environmentalist and social activist
- Tim Ozinga, American politician

== See also ==
- Ozinga Field, a baseball field located in Crestwood, Illinois
