= Drew Griffin =

American journalist (1962–2022)

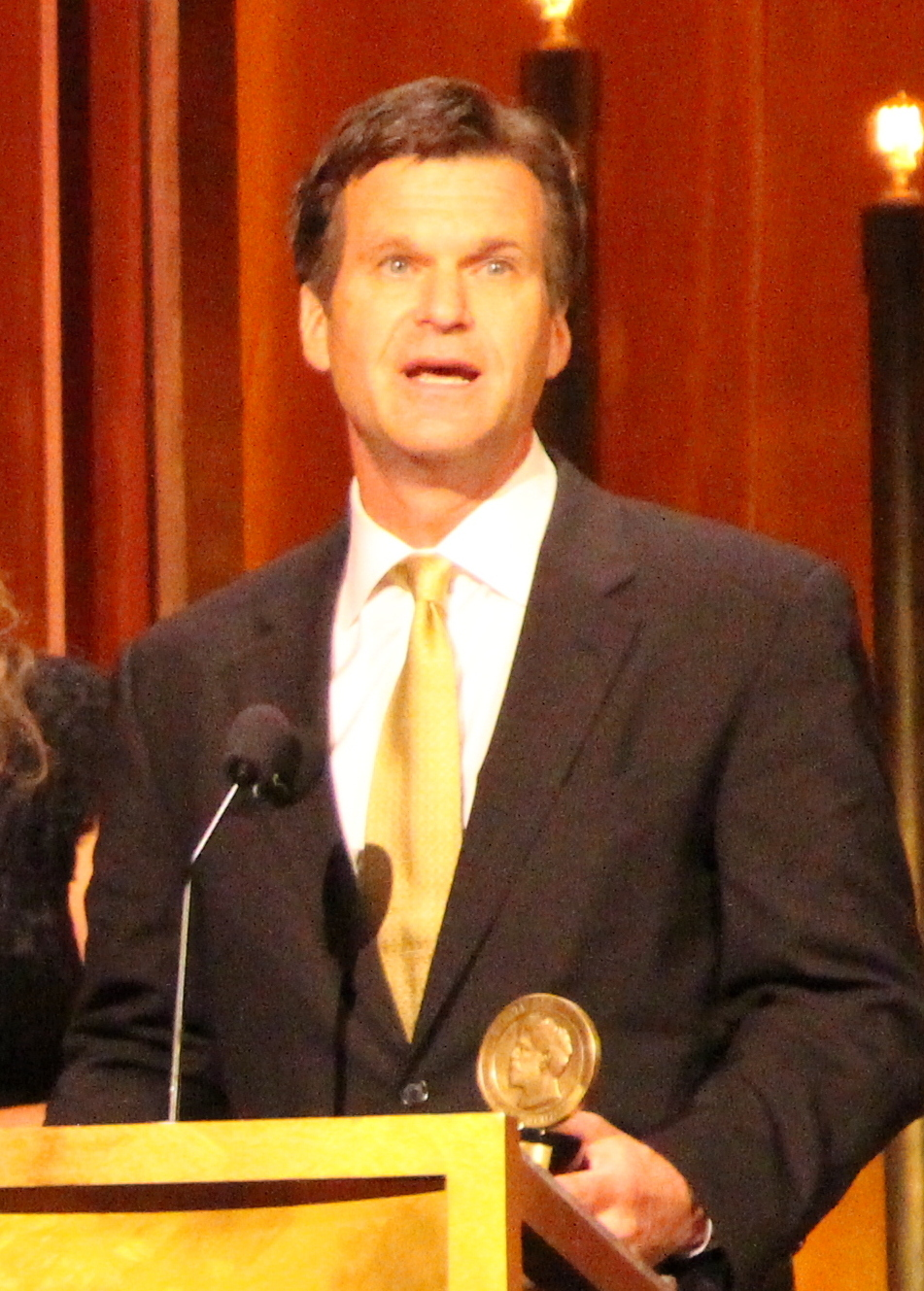
- Griffin in 2015
- Born: Andrew Charles Griffin; October 21, 1962; Chicago, Illinois, U.S.
- Died: December 17, 2022 (aged 60); Georgia, U.S.
- Education: University of Illinois Urbana-Champaign (BA)
- Occupation: Journalist
- Employers: KCBS-TV (1994–2004); CNN (2004–2022)
- Spouse: Margot Griffin
- Children: 3

Andrew Charles Griffin (October 21, 1962 – December 17, 2022) was an American journalist. He won several Emmy Awards and Peabody Awards for his work at CNN, notably for the coverage of Hurricane Katrina in 2005 and an investigation that led to the Veterans Health Administration controversy of 2014.

== Early life and education ==
Griffin was born on October 21, 1962 to Michael and Judith Griffin, who worked as a civil engineer and lawyer, respectively.

Griffin was educated at Evergreen Park Community High School, a public high school in the village of Evergreen Park, Illinois, followed by the University of Illinois Urbana-Champaign, where he majored in communications.

== Career ==
Griffin began his career at WICD-TV in Illinois, before stints in Florida, North Carolina, South Carolina, and Washington, D.C. He then worked as an investigative reporter for ten years at CBS 2 News in Los Angeles. He joined CNN in May 2004.

In September 2005, Griffin covered the aftermath of Hurricane Katrina in New Orleans. Griffin's reports on the looting by some police officers prompted police investigations. He also broke stories about nursing home deaths after Katrina. Griffin, along with CNN, won a Peabody award for his Hurricane Katrina coverage.

In 2014, Griffin covered an investigation into delays in medical care at the Veterans Health Administration health system, which resulted in at least 19 patient deaths. VA Secretary Eric Shinseki eventually resigned following coverage of the scandal. A few years later, Griffin covered sexual assault cases involving drivers for the ridesharing company, Uber.

Among his last notable works was the coverage of events following the January 6 United States Capitol attack in 2021.

== Awards ==
Griffin won a business and financial reporting Emmy Award in 2005 for his reports on a fault in Ford Motor Company vehicles which caused them to catch fire. He earned his second Emmy in 2006 for How to Rob a Bank, a documentary for CNN Presents, and a third in 2007 for Hidden Spending, a report on congressional spending broadcast as a segment in Anderson Cooper 360°. Crisis at the VA, which broke the story on scandals of hidden wait times and deaths at VA hospitals across the country, garnered a Peabody award in 2015. His fourth Emmy, in 2017, was awarded for Trump University Fraud, about fraudulent practices behind Donald Trump's real estate school.

== Personal life and death ==
Griffin was a native of Chicago, Illinois. He and his wife, Margot, had three children. He lived in the Atlanta metropolitan area, and died from cancer at home on December 17, 2022, at age 60.
