= Tornado outbreak of April 21, 1967 =

Weather event in the United States

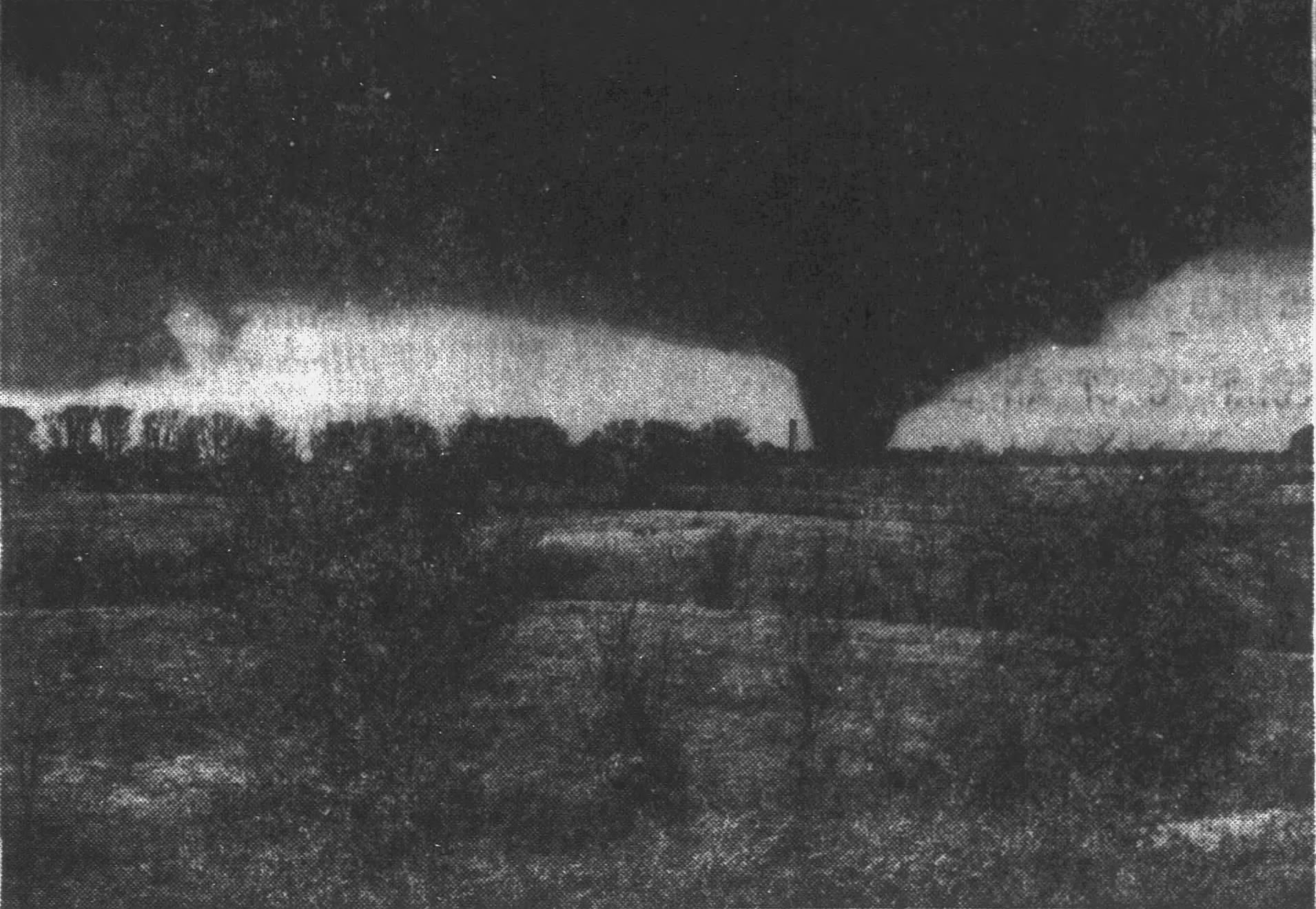
- A large F4 tornado approaching Bucklin, Missouri

Meteorological history
- Duration: April 21, 1967

Tornado outbreak
- Tornadoes: 45
- Max. rating: F4 tornado

Overall effects
- Fatalities: 58
- Injuries: 1,418
- Damage: $56.432 million (1967 USD); 536.730 million (2025 USD)
- Areas affected: Midwestern United States
- Part of the tornado outbreaks of 1967

A destructive tornado outbreak affected much of the Midwestern United States on April 21, 1967, in particular the towns of Belvidere and Oak Lawn, Illinois, United States. It was the largest tornado outbreak of 1967 and has been described by NWS Chicago as "Northern Illinois' worst tornado disaster". The outbreak produced numerous and significant (F2+) tornadoes, with ten of them in Illinois alone. Included was one of just six documented violent (F4/F5) tornadoes in the Chicago metropolitan area since the area was first settled.

== Meteorological synopsis ==
April 21, 1967 was a warm Friday afternoon in northern Illinois. Following a foggy morning with temperatures in the middle 50s °F, temperatures rose rapidly in the afternoon as low geopotential heights approached from the southwest. A warm front—part of a very deep shortwave trough—passed through Illinois all day and by afternoon moved north of the state. As a low-pressure area within an extratropical cyclone approached the area, temperatures rose into the low to mid 70s°F with dew points rising into the 60s°F, an upper-level jet reaching 120-knot (220 km/h), and increasing low-level vertical shear. Meanwhile, a persistent mesolow feature near Joliet, Illinois, helped to maintain backed low-level winds from the south.

Outbreak death toll
State	Total	County	County total
Illinois	58	Boone	24
Illinois	58	Cook	33
Illinois	58	Lake	1
Totals	58		
All deaths were tornado-related

As conditions became more favorable for tornadoes and supercells began developing in the Chicago area, the regional U.S. Weather Bureau office issued a tornado watch at 1:50 p.m. CDT covering the northern half of Illinois plus southern Wisconsin, eastern Iowa, and western Indiana. By 3 p.m. CDT/2100 UTC, more than 12 tornadoes had already been spawned from the storm system.

== Confirmed tornadoes ==
Confirmed tornadoes by Fujita rating
FU	F0	F1	F2	F3	F4	F5	Total
3	5	15	17	3	5	0	45

F#	Location	County	Time (UTC)	Path length	Damage
Missouri
F0	NE of Azen	Scotland	1400	1 mile (1.6 km)	Tornado was observed on the ground but apparently caused no damage.
F1	NE of Gower	Clinton	1830	0.2 miles (0.32 km)	Dust-laden tornado was seen but caused no damage.
F1	Cameron	Clinton	1900	0.1 miles (0.16 km)	Tornado caused some damage in south Cameron. Condensation funnel was reportedly absent.
F2	E of Pattonsburg	Daviess	1900	8.4 miles (13.5 km)	Tornado completely leveled all buildings except the house at one farm site and destroyed one wall of the house. Tornado may have formed from the same thunderstorm that struck Cameron, but the time does not suggest this.
F0	NE of Gallatin	Daviess	1915	0.1 miles (0.16 km)	Brief touchdown failed to produce evidence of damage.
F3	N of Mandeville	Ray, Carroll	1920	14.6 miles (23.5 km)	Tornado extensively damaged or leveled homes, barns, and other outbuildings. It also injured livestock.
F2	S of Humphreys	Grundy, Sullivan	2000	6.3 miles (10.1 km)	Tornado destroyed eight homes, severely damaged seven others, and shattered glass windows as it hit Humphreys. Two children and a woman were injured in their trailer, as were four men sheltering inside a barn. Grazulis rated the tornado F3.
F2	NE of Cunningham	Chariton	2010	3 miles (4.8 km)	Neither Grazulis (1991) nor Storm Data lists this tornado, suggesting that it was either weaker than F2 in intensity or never existed.
F4	NE of Sumner to W of Newark	Linn, Macon, Knox	2020	59 miles (95 km)	Four homes and several barns were completely leveled while two people received minor injuries. Three or more funnels and erratic shifts in the damage path were reported to have occurred, suggesting that the long-tracked tornado was in fact a tornado family.
F2	W of Marshall to SE of Slater	Saline	2020	20.4 miles (32.8 km)	This tornado may have actually included two or more touchdowns, implying that the single event was two or more tornadoes. It caused minor damage to a porch and to farm buildings along its skipping path. Grazulis did not rate the tornado as significant (F2+).
F0	W of Corder	Lafayette	2103	0.1 miles (0.16 km)	Tornado did not cause any noticeable damage.
F1	NE of Adrian	Bates	2110	0.1 miles (0.16 km)	Tornado produced minor damage to buildings and farm equipment.
Indiana
F1	Rushville	Rush	1833	0.1 miles (0.16 km)	
F2	NE of Commiskey	Jennings, Jefferson	2310	6.3 miles (10.1 km)	Tornado unroofed and destroyed two homes, injuring two people, and then leveled a trailer and farm buildings.
F0	NE of Monticello	White	0227	0.1 miles (0.16 km)	Tornado produced very minimal damage.
Iowa
F3	E of Fairfield	Jefferson	2000	0.1 miles (0.16 km)	Tornado never hit any structures and only briefly made contact with the ground.
F2	E of Birmingham to NE of Mount Union	Van Buren, Hancock	2100	32.8 miles (52.8 km)	Tornado damaged 12 or more farms with only minimal F2 intensity at most. The damage path was very discontinuous, with only isolated patches of "extensive damage."
Illinois
F1	SW of Spring Hill	Whiteside	2130	0.3 miles (0.48 km)	
F2	E of Coal Valley to S of Hooppole	Henry	2135	25.1 miles (40.4 km)	Numerous funnel clouds occurred with multiple reports of tornadoes. First tornado touched down north of Orion with isolated touchdowns to beyond Hooppole, with significant non-tornado-related wind damage. Tornado killed livestock, destroyed farm buildings, and uprooted trees.
F2	N of Hooppole	Henry	2150	4.5 miles (7.2 km)	Second Hooppole tornado leveled farm buildings and blew down large trees in rural areas.
F4	SW of Belvidere to N of Woodstock	Boone, McHenry	2150	25.5 miles (41.0 km)	24 deaths — See article on this tornado
F1	S of Daysville	Ogle	2200	1 mile (1.6 km)	Tornado caused damage to many homes and downed trees while moving north, unlike other tornadoes this day which moved east-northeast.
F2	W of Maytown	Lee	2202	5.6 miles (9.0 km)	Tornado severely damaged trees and farms and flipped a truck on Illinois State Highway 76 (now an Illinois route).
F1	SE of Amboy	Lee	2215	5.6 miles (9.0 km)	Tornado destroyed barns and blew down trees. Two distinct damage paths and funnel clouds observed, suggesting that a family of two tornadoes was involved.
F1	W of Kasbeer	Bureau	2230	0.5 miles (0.80 km)	Tornado destroyed buildings on farms and scattered debris about. Almost went undetected but was observed by mushroom–gatherers.
F2	SE of Hennepin	Putnam	2230	0.3 miles (0.48 km)	Tornado injured a man as it flipped two trailers and caused minimal tree damage. Grazulis (1993) did not rate the tornado as significant (F2+).
F1	SE of DeKalb	DeKalb	2240	2 miles (3.2 km)	Two tornadoes touched down 2 miles (3.2 km) apart from each other but are listed as one tornado. One tornado damaged structures and broke glass and trees at Northern Illinois University while uplifting a roof 1 mile (1.6 km) to the south with $50,000 (1967 USD) roof damage. Second tornado damaged farms simultaneously about 8 miles (13 km) to the south, but with discontinuous damage. Probably a tornado family.
F4	NW of Middlebury to Lake Zurich to W of Hawthorn Woods	McHenry, Lake	2300	8.8 miles (14.2 km)	1 death — See section on this tornado
F2	Elgin	Kane	2310	0.3 miles (0.48 km)	Tornado destroyed one barn and caused roof and wall damage to Elgin State Hospital. Also badly damaged a factory. The state hospital sustained $100,000 in damages.
F1	NW of Bloomingdale	DuPage	2310	0.5 miles (0.80 km)	Tornado briefly hit Keeneyville with little damage.
F1	Addison to Schiller Park	DuPage, Cook	2310	6.8 miles (10.9 km)	Tornado skipped through several communities, including Franklin Park, with minimal damage.
F4	Palos Hills/Oak Lawn to Chicago South Side (entered Lake Michigan at 79th Street beach)	Cook	2324	15 miles (24 km)	33 deaths — See article on this tornado
F1	Lincoln Park	Cook	2340	0.3 miles (0.48 km)	Tornado damaged an amusement park before moving over Lake Michigan.
F1	Champaign	Champaign	0250	0.1 miles (0.16 km)	Brief touchdown on a farm.
F2	Geneva	Kane, Cook	unknown	unknown	Tornado struck 3 homes on the north side of Batavia before damaging 25 homes in Geneva. Some of the homes lost roofs and walls. 20 homes were also damaged in Streamwood.
Michigan
F2	Casco to Dunningville	Allegan	2355	18.6 miles (29.9 km)	Trailer and warehouse destroyed with many homes damaged. Minor injuries reported. Grazulis did not rate the tornado as significant (F2+).
F3	SW of Grandville to E of Ada	Kent	2358	13.6 miles (21.9 km)	Struck the south side of Grand Rapids. 65 buildings were destroyed, and 60 others were badly damaged. 375 buildings sustained minor damage. A church and a K-Mart store were completely destroyed.
F2	NE of Middleville to NW of Lake Odessa	Barry	0000	14.5 miles (23.3 km)	A house had its roof and kitchen ripped off.
F2	Derby	Berrien	0025	1 mile (1.6 km)	School under construction leveled, pieces carried 1/2 mile (0.80 km) away. Several barns and outbuildings leveled as well. Grazulis did not rate the tornado as significant (F2+).
F0	S of Holton	Muskegon	0110	0.1 miles (0.16 km)	A brief tornado touchdown in a rural area with other funnels also witnessed to have touched down.
F2	Portland	Ionia	0115	0.1 miles (0.16 km)	Homes were unroofed in Portland, four barns were destroyed, and 40 cattle were killed.
F4	NE of Westphalia	Clinton	0115	12 miles (19 km)	This violent destroyed buildings on 10 farms. Three homes were destroyed, 18 others were damaged, and 34 sheep were killed in 2 barns. Grazulis rated the tornado F3.
F2	N of Cascade	Kent	0130	0.3 miles (0.48 km)	Rural outbuildings were destroyed along its path. Grazulis did not rate the tornado as significant (F2+).
F1	N of Sunfield	Eaton	0148	0.1 miles (0.16 km)	Some farm buildings were destroyed.
F2	Potterville to Lansing	Eaton, Ingham	0210	10.9 miles (17.5 km)	A barn and a Meijer store were destroyed, and the side of a house was torn off.

=== Belvidere, Illinois ===
Belvidere, Illinois
- The tornado near Belvidere

Meteorological history
- Formed: April 21, 1967, 3:50 p.m. CDT (UTC−05:00)

F4 tornado
- on the Fujita scale

Overall effects
- Fatalities: 24
- Injuries: 410
- Damage: $250,000 (1967 USD)

This enormous and violent F4 tornado, which struck the Belvidere-Harvard-Woodstock area, was responsible for one of the highest tornado-related death tolls in a single school building ever recorded when it struck Belvidere High School as multiple school buses were being loaded. At 3:50 P.M., a violent multiple vortex tornado, later given an F4 rating, moved through Belvidere, Illinois, damaging the high school and overturning buses. A total of 24 people were killed with 13 of the dead in Belvidere at Belvidere High School, making this tornado the sixth deadliest ever to hit a school. 410 people were injured as well and 127 homes destroyed with another 379 being damaged. The Belvidere tornado was especially devastating because it hit the school just as students were getting on the buses to go home. Just before 4 p.m. CDT, the tornado reached the school. Twelve buses, already filled with elementary- and middle-school students, were tossed about. Several of the students were tossed into adjacent fields and killed. A bus driver was killed as well. Shortly after the passing of the tornado, faculty and some of the stronger students used the fireproof doors of the high school as stretchers to carry the injured into the cafeteria, the severely injured into the library, and the dead into the gymnasium. Four hundred cars (three hundred new cars and 100 employee cars) were destroyed at the Belvidere Assembly Plant. A school bus on a roadway south of Harvard was thrown into power lines and torn in half. The driver and students survived by sheltering in a ditch.

=== Lake Zurich, Illinois ===
Lake Zurich, Illinois
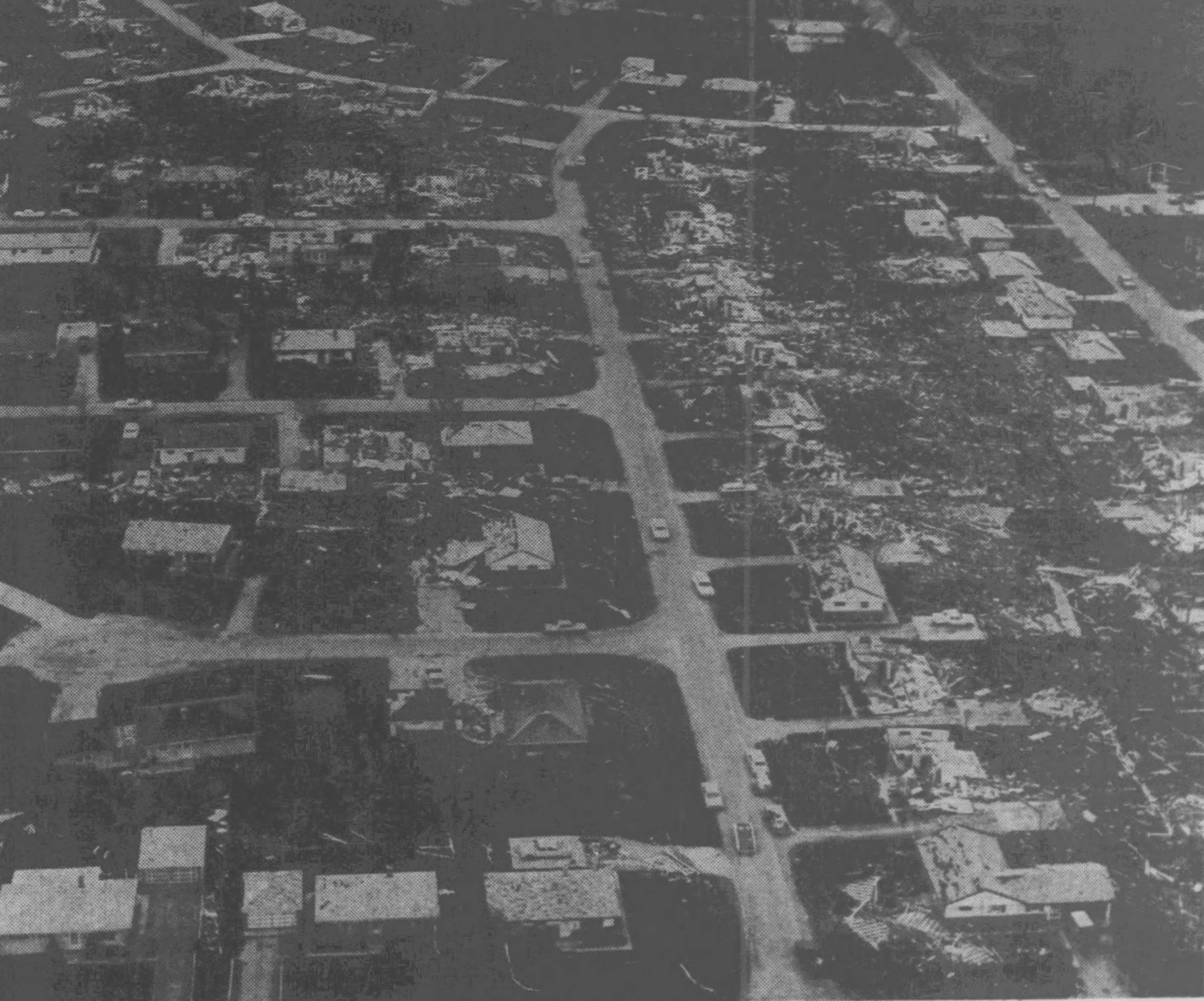
- An aerial photo of tornado damage in Lake Zurich

F4 tornado
- on the Fujita scale

Overall effects
- Fatalities: 1

This violent tornado, the second violent tornado of the day in Illinois, may have developed as far southwest as Elgin but was first observed at about 5:00 p.m. CDT near Fox River Grove, though its path is officially believed to have begun near Middlebury. It then produced a discontinuous damage path through Fox River Grove, North Barrington, and Lake Zurich. The most intense damage, given an F4 rating, occurred at Lake Zurich Manor, about 1.5 miles (2.4 km) northwest of downtown Lake Zurich; there, roughly 75 homes were leveled and 200 severely damaged. The Acorn Acres subdivision, northeast of and adjoining Lake Zurich Manor, reported scattered damage and debris with about 12 homes severely damaged. According to official plots from Storm Data, the tornado lifted after hitting Acorn Acres, though non-tornadic damages to trees and buildings occurred as far as the intersection of Illinois Route 63 and Gilmer Road. There, severe winds, possibly downbursts, destroyed four homes, one brewery, and a plastic-manufacturing site, though at least one source indicates that the tornado was likely still present at that place. In all, the tornado killed one person, and damaged 400–500 homes and destroyed about 100 other homes. An air-conditioning unit weighing 1,000 lb (16,000 oz) was thrown .5 mi (0.80 km). Cars were picked up and tossed as well.

=== Oak Lawn–Evergreen Park–Chicago, Illinois ===
Oak Lawn–Evergreen Park–Chicago, Illinois
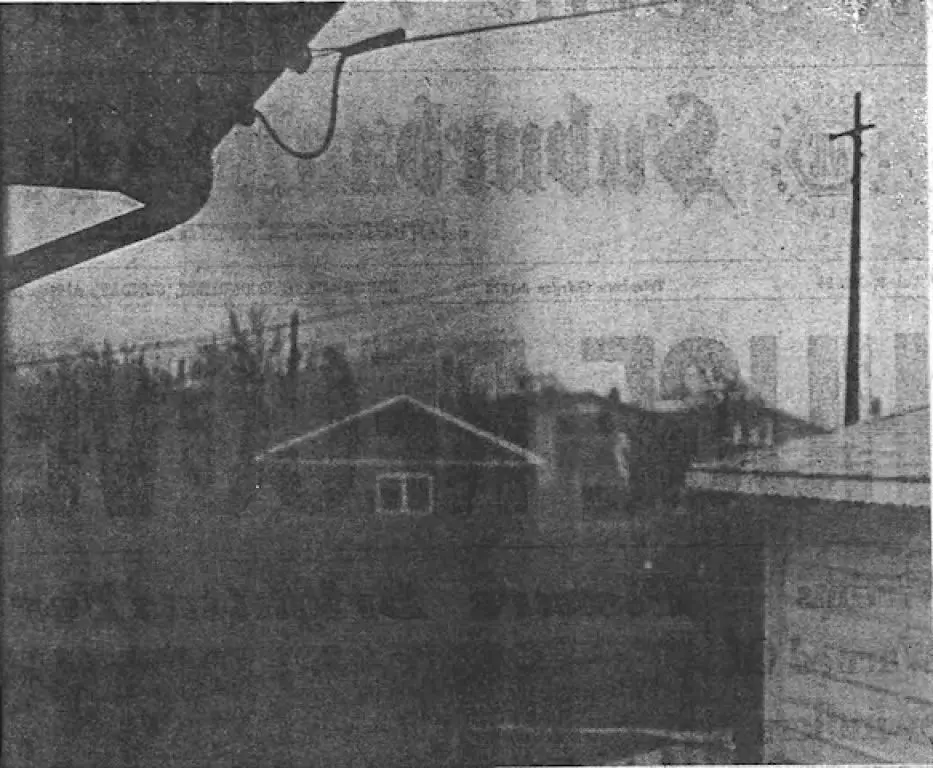
- The tornado as seen in Oak Lawn

F4 tornado
- on the Fujita scale

Overall effects
- Fatalities: 33
- Injuries: ~500-1,000
- Damage: $40 million+ (1967 USD)

This deadly, violent and horrific tornado was the deadliest tornado of the entire outbreak and the deadliest tornado to ever hit the metropolitan area of Chicago. The tornado that swept through Palos Hills, Oak Lawn, Hometown, Evergreen Park, and skipped through Chicago's Southside, killed 33 people. The path of this tornado was 16 miles long, and at times 200 yards (180 m) wide. It dissipated at Rainbow Beach on Lake Michigan.

An intense supercell with a hook echo on weather radar first appeared at 4:45 p.m. CDT about 18 miles (29 km) west-northwest of Joliet. Later, at 5:15 p.m., an employee of the U.S. Weather Bureau observed a rotating wall cloud about 10 miles (16 km) north of Joliet. Minutes later, severe thunderstorm winds blew out windows in a building, though no tornado or funnel cloud had yet occurred. Near the Little Red Schoolhouse, in what is now the Forest Preserve District of Cook County, an observer first noted a funnel cloud to the south, moving east with hail up to .75 inches (19 mm) in diameter—but he was unable to report to the Weather Bureau as his telephone failed to give a dial tone. At 5:24 p.m. CDT, a tornado touched down at the present-day campus of Moraine Valley Community College and moved east-northeast, mainly at 70° heading. As it touched down, the tornado bent power poles and blew down small trees and vegetation, tossing dirt as it went. It then grew in size to 450 feet (150 yd) wide and entered Palos Hills, destroying about five buildings—including two frame homes and a brick home—and snapping trees. Subsequently, the intensifying funnel severely damaged homes and a drive-in theater in a half-block-wide area of Chicago Ridge.

Over the next six minutes, the tornado attained its maximum intensity as it tore a 16.2-mile (26.1 km) swath of damage through Oak Lawn, Hometown, and Evergreen Park at a 60-mile-per-hour (97 km/h) ground forward speed. As it passed through the business district of Oak Lawn, the tornado leveled many homes that were built entirely of brick. In Oak Lawn, the tornado threw 25–40 vehicles from the intersection of Southwest Highway and W. 95th St. (US-12/20), killing 16 people who were stuck in traffic during the rush hour. At the same intersection, the tornado destroyed the gym at Oak Lawn Community High School, including the locker room to which the students had been evacuated. Though none were killed, several students were injured. Seven shoppers were killed across the street when the roof of a grocery store collapsed on them.

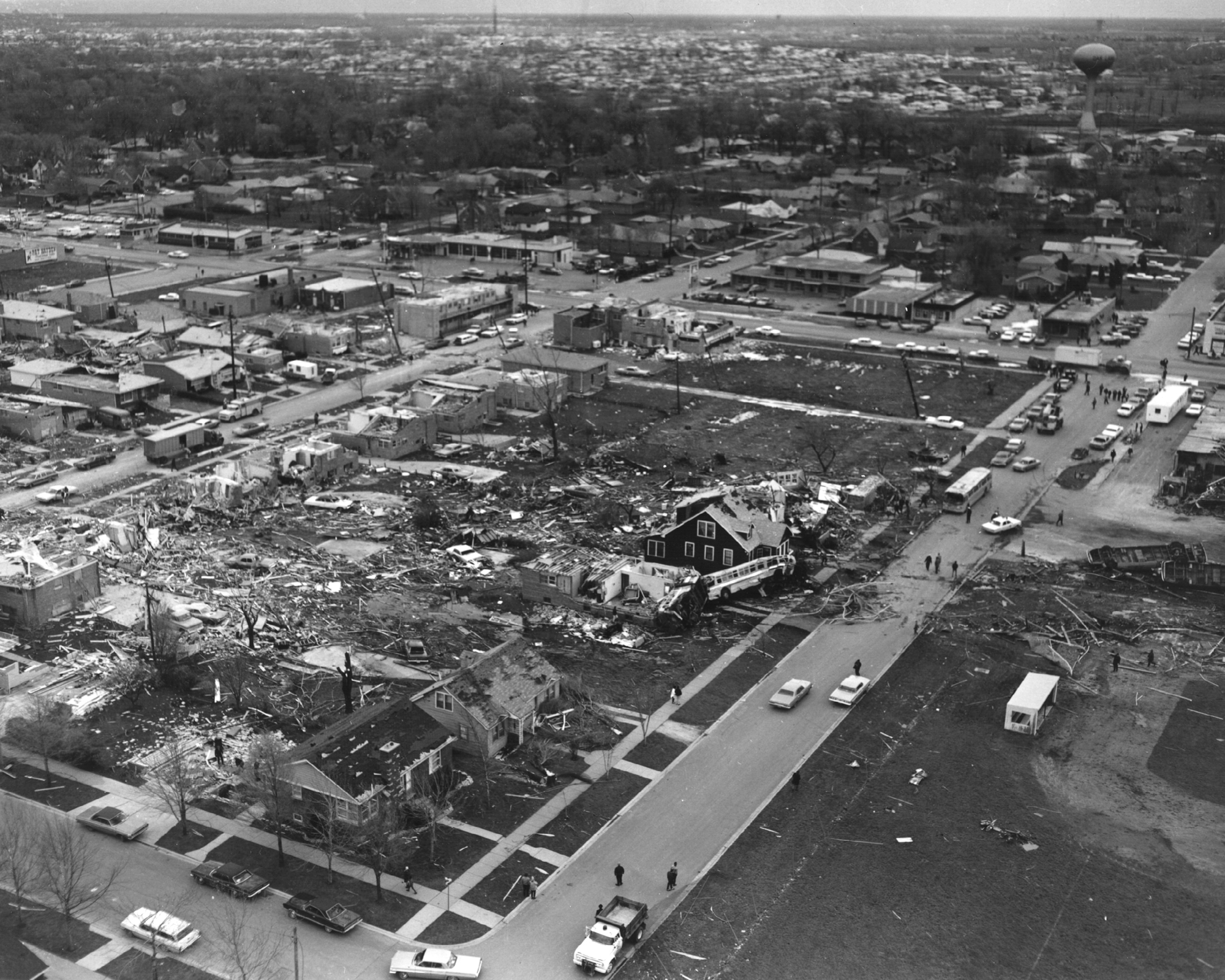
Aerial view of tornado damage in Oak Lawn

This tornado ended up being the deadliest of the outbreak. It destroyed the brick pro shop at Beverly Country Club at 87th and Western Avenue, trapping several people who suffered only minor injuries. As it moved beyond Evergreen Park, the tornado weakened and widened as it caused lighter damage to vegetation, roofs, and garages. It finally moved offshore as a waterspout at Rainbow Beach, producing a wind gust up to 100 miles per hour (160 km/h) at a water filtration plant on the lakefront shore. In all, the tornado killed 33 people, including several children at a roller skating rink, and injured 1,000. It destroyed 152 homes and damaged 900, causing $40 million in damage. The destroyed buildings included a high school, grocery store, tavern, market, motel, drive-in theater, restaurant, numerous apartments, and two gas stations. Additionally, the tornado caused numerous fires in Oak Lawn which were quickly extinguished.

== Recovery difficulties ==
Just two days after the outbreak, three inches (76 mm) of snow fell on Belvidere, which only exacerbated the cleanup from Friday's tornadoes. In fact, many cities and towns in the Midwest broke record overnight lows on April 24 and 25. A state of emergency was declared for Boone County, and the reserves came to assist in the cleanup effort.

== Legacy ==
The tornado has its own section in the Oak Lawn Public Library.

== See also ==
- List of North American tornadoes and tornado outbreaks
- List of tornado related deaths at schools
- 1990 Plainfield tornado
- Severe weather sequence of July 13–16, 2024, another large-scale tornado outbreak across northern Illinois
