= Tornadoes of 1967 =

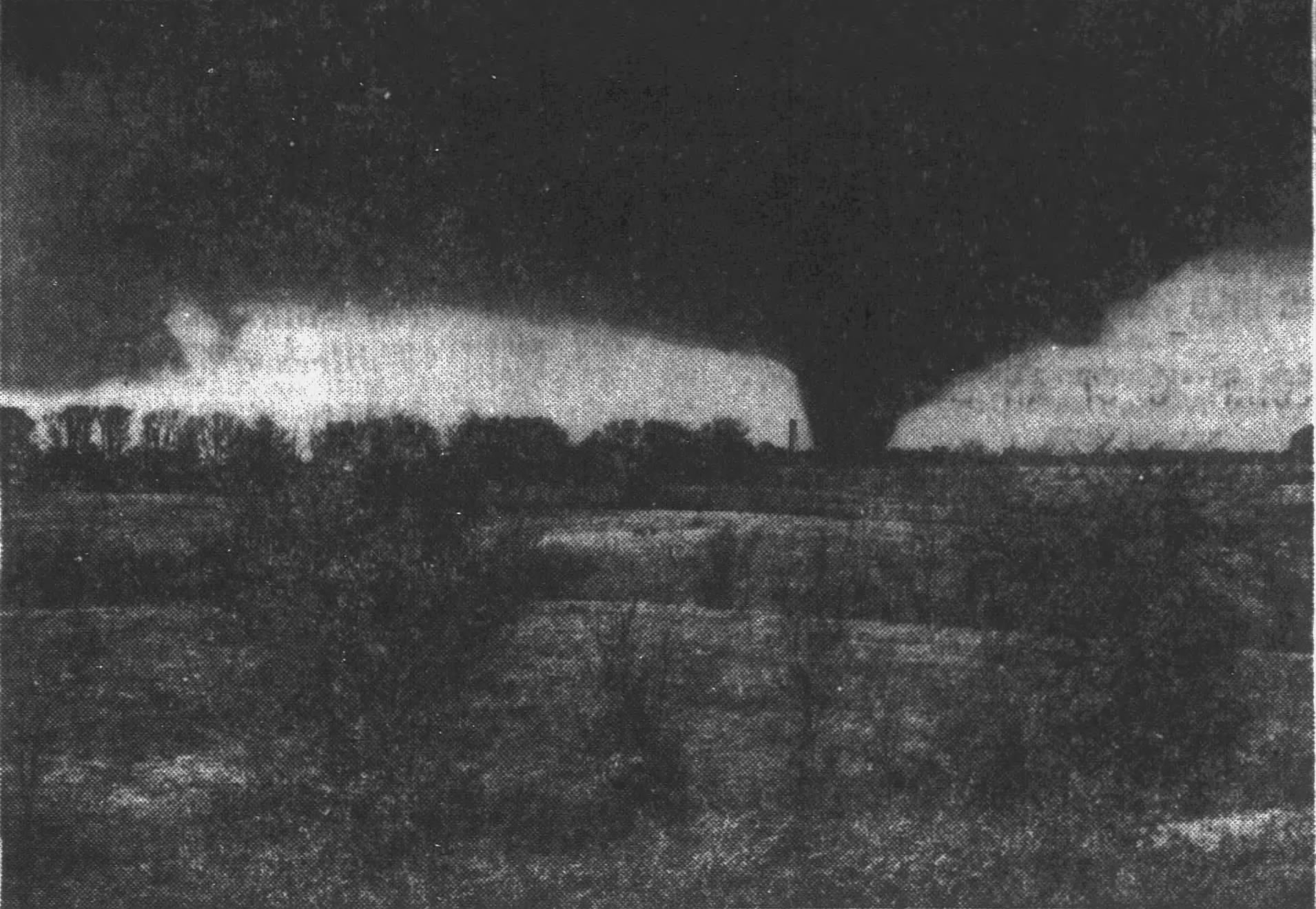
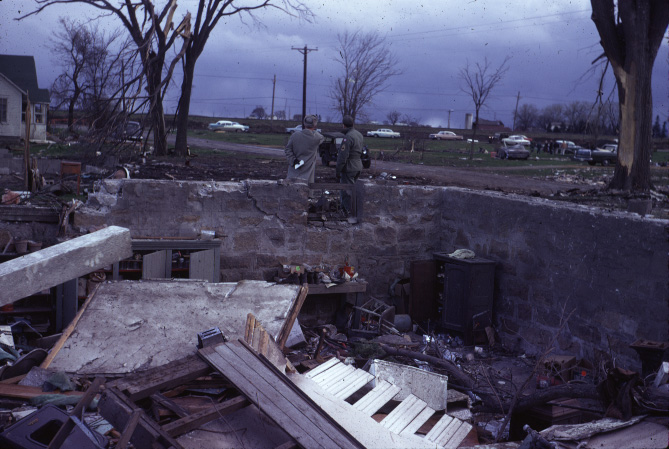
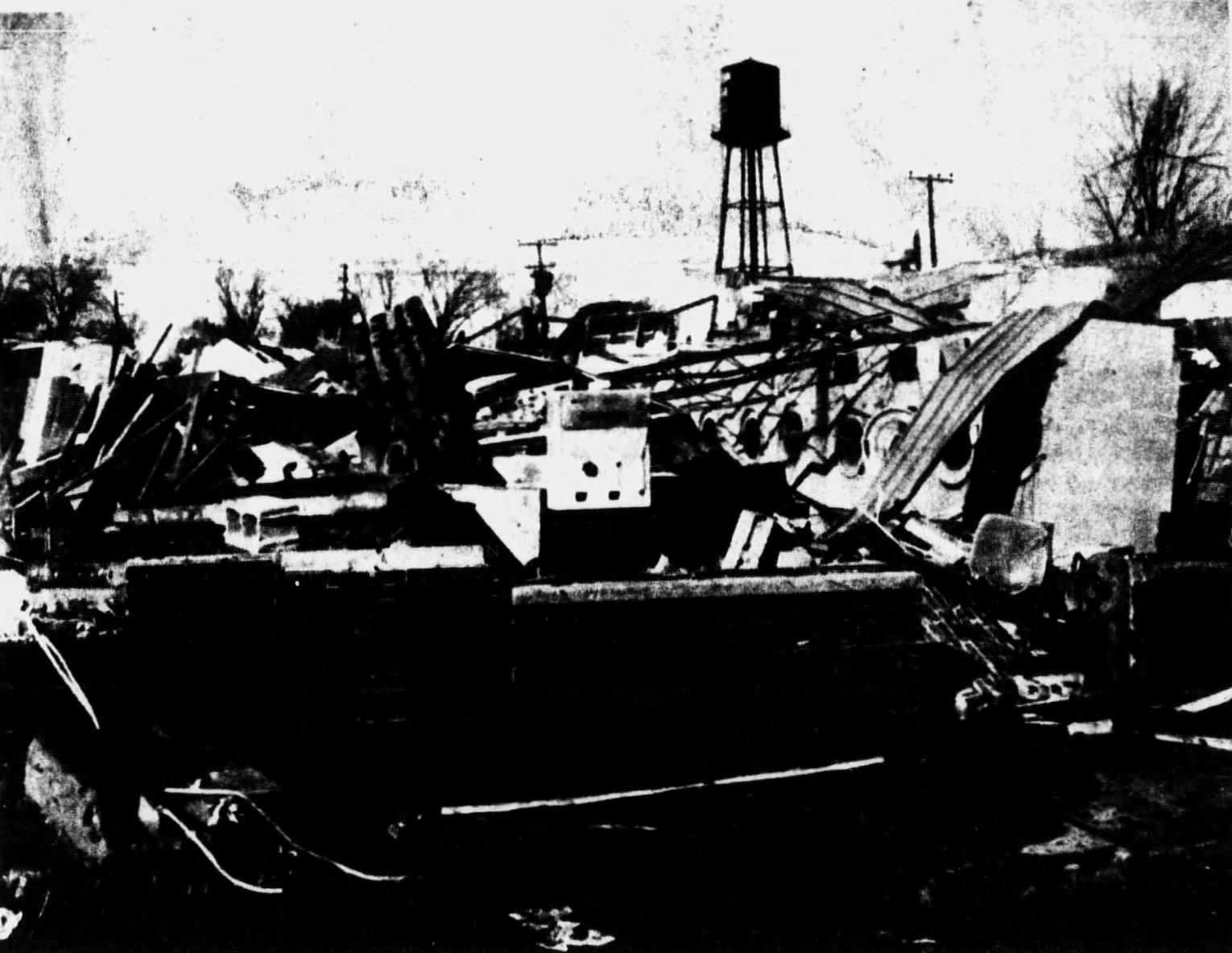
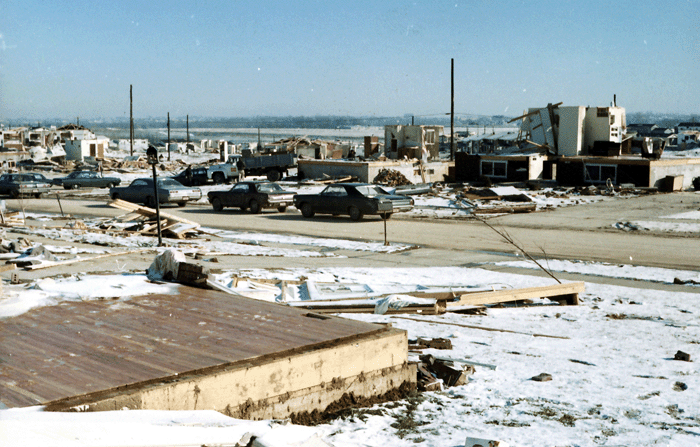
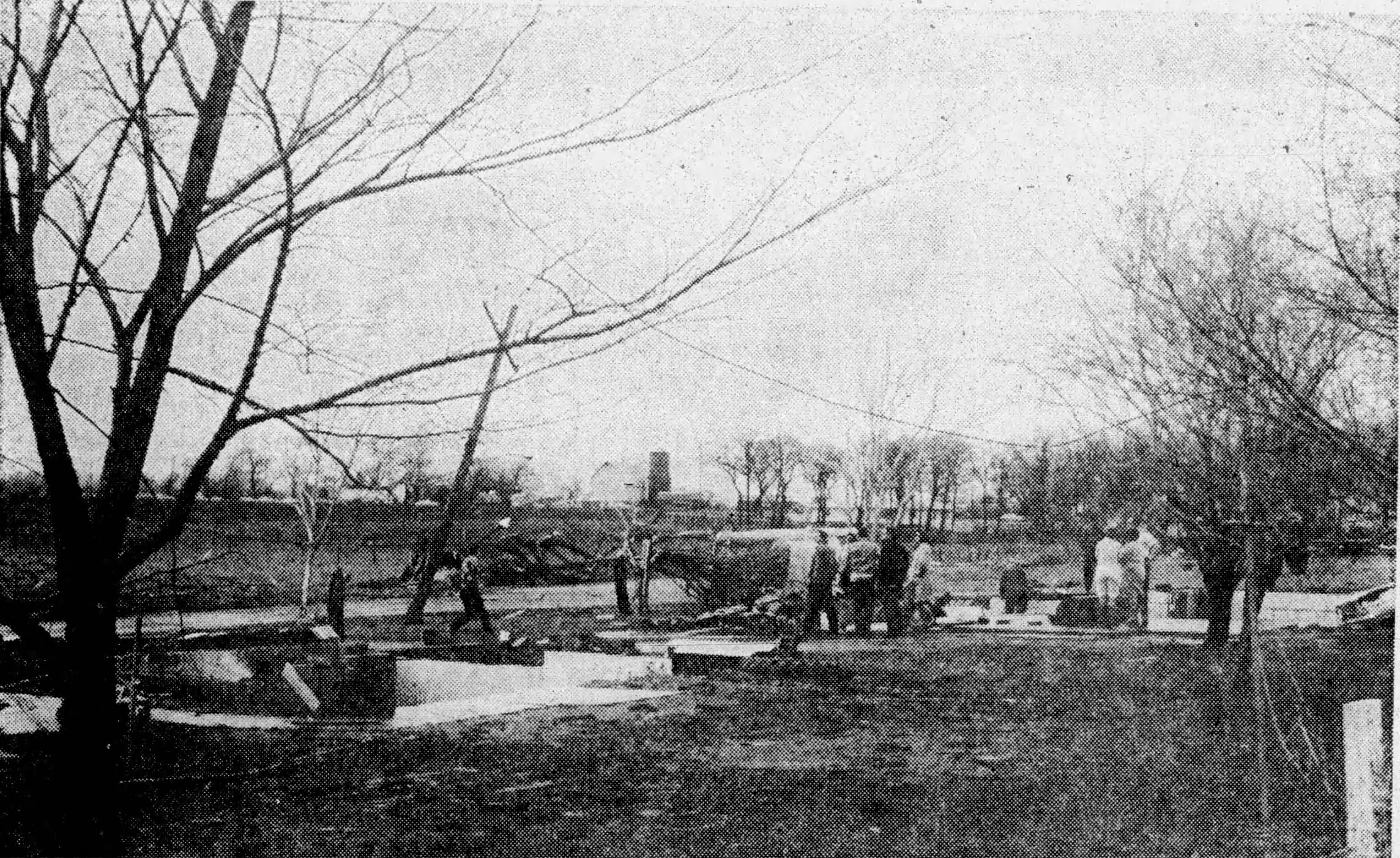
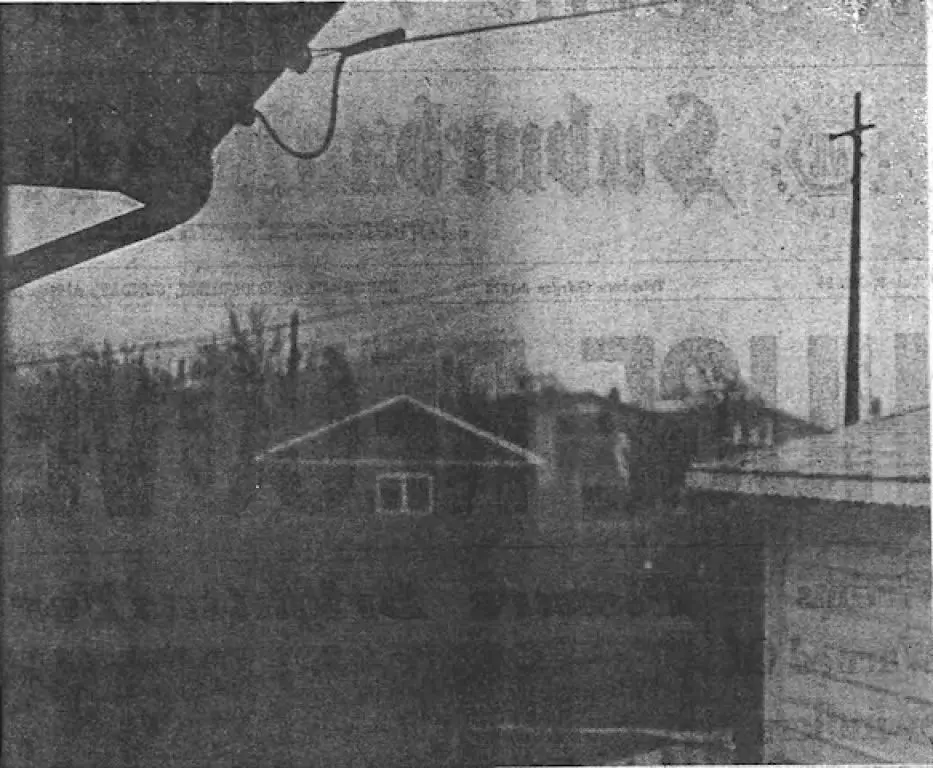
- Clockwise from top: A large F4 tornado approaching Bucklin, Missouri on April 21; The ruins of a shopping center in Potosi, Missouri after an F4 tornado on December 20; Two homes in Albert Lea, Minnesota after an F4 tornado on April 30; A large F4 tornado shortly after formation in Oak Lawn, Illinois on April 21; Multiple homes leveled on Glengate Drive in Maryland Heights, Missouri after an F4 tornado on January 24; A destroyed home in Waseca, Minnesota after an F4 tornado on April 30.
- Timespan: January – December 1967
- Maximum rated tornado: IF5 tornado: Palluel, Pas-de-Calais, France on June 24
- Tornadoes in U.S.: 927
- Damage (U.S.): Unknown
- Fatalities (U.S.): 114
- Fatalities (worldwide): >114

This page documents the tornadoes and tornado outbreaks of 1967, primarily in the United States. Most tornadoes form in the U.S., although some events may take place internationally. Tornado statistics for older years like this often appear significantly lower than modern years due to fewer reports or confirmed tornadoes.

== Events ==
Fatal United States tornadoes in 1967
- Approximate touchdown location of killer tornadoes in 1967
Summary of tornadoes
- January 24 – Missouri (2 deaths)
- January 24 – Iowa (1 death)
- January 24 – Illinois (1 death)
- January 24 – Missouri (3 deaths)
- March 6 – Alabama (2 deaths)
- March 12 – Tennessee (1 death)
- April 16 – Iowa (2 deaths)
- April 21 – Illinois (24 deaths)
- April 21 – Illinois (1 death)
- April 21 – Illinois (33 deaths)
- April 30 – Minnesota (2 deaths)
- April 30 – Minnesota (5 deaths)
- April 30 – Minnesota (6 deaths)
- May 6 – Alabama (1 death)
- May 19 – Maryland (1 death)
- May 31 – Tennessee (1 death)
- June 9 – Kansas (1 death)
- June 10 – Oklahoma (4 deaths)
- June 23 – Kansas (1 death)
- July 22 – Minnesota (1 death)
- August 2 – Wisconsin (2 deaths)
- September 20 – Texas (4 deaths)
- September 20 – Texas (1 death)
- October 30 – Mississippi (4 deaths)
- December 2 – Mississippi (2 deaths)
- December 10 – Florida (1 death)
- December 10 – Florida (1 death)
- December 18 – Alabama (2 deaths)
- December 21 – Missouri (3 deaths)
- December 21 – Mississippi (1 death)
Total fatalities: 114

The 1967 tornado season was very active with numerous large, destructive, and deadly outbreaks taking place. In fact, the only months not to have tornado-related fatalities were February and November, although both saw numerous injuries. The deadliest outbreak occurred in April while the biggest one occurred in September. The month of December was incredibly active as well, producing an unusually high 61 tornadoes with 60 of them stemming from three large outbreaks that occurred during the month. This remains one of the most-active December's on record.

=== United States yearly total ===
Confirmed tornadoes by Fujita rating
FU	F0	F1	F2	F3	F4	F5	Total
0	282	327	243	58	17	0	927

== January ==
There were 39 confirmed tornadoes in the United States in January.

=== January 24 ===
FU	F0	F1	F2	F3	F4	F5
0	3	4	15	6	2	0

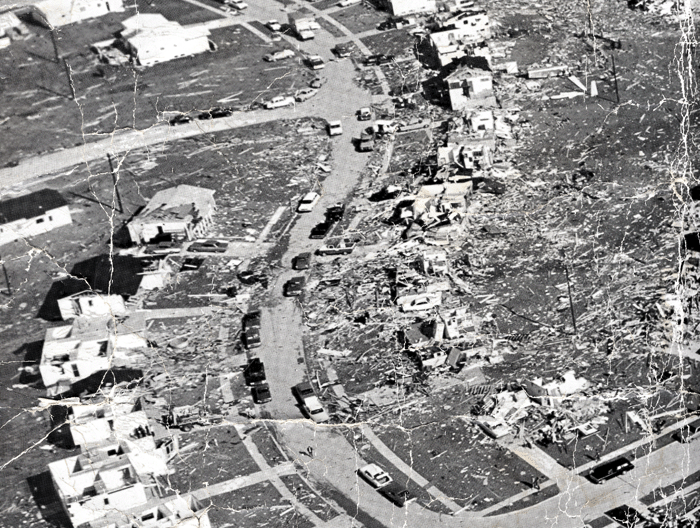
An aerial view of damage in Chesterfield, Missouri.

A low pressure system produced one of the northernmost winter tornado outbreak on record, with strong tornadoes forming as far north as Wisconsin. An F4 tornado tore through the suburbs of St. Louis, killing three people, injuring 216, and destroying 168 homes. More than 1740 homes were damaged and more than 600 businesses were damaged or destroyed. Another F4 tornado destroyed 5 farms near Queen City, Missouri, completely leveling two of them. This tornado continued into Iowa, where it only produced F1 damage. An F3 tornado hit Buckner and Orrick, Missouri. The tornado collapsed the roof of the high school in Orrick, killing two students. The tornado also destroyed two homes and tore the roof from a third. Another F3 destroyed two houses and killed a child near Fort Madison, Iowa. A fourth killer tornado, also rated F3, destroyed houses and outbuildings. One person was killed after being thrown 200 feet (60 m) and three people were injured. Another F3 tornado destroyed three homes in Mount Carroll, Illinois, destroying three homes and producing near-F4 damage. The northernmost tornado of the outbreak was an F3 storm that passed near Brodhead and Milton, Wisconsin, destroying barns and tearing the roof and walls from a country club.

== February ==
There were 8 confirmed tornadoes in the United States in February.

== March ==
There were 42 confirmed tornadoes in the United States in March.

=== March 5–6 ===
FU	F0	F1	F2	F3	F4	F5
0	0	6	5	1	1	0

A low pressure system spawned 13 tornadoes as it moved across the Southeastern United States. On March 5, an F3 tornado struck Hot Springs, Arkansas, damaging or destroying 18 homes and injuring six people. An F2 tornado moved through Little Rock, damaging homes and businesses and injuring four people. The next day an F4 tornado passed north of Birmingham, Alabama, destroying homes and farms in and near Rocky Hollow and Empire and killing a person in each community. On one farm the tornado destroyed 16 buildings containing 250,000 hens. An F2 tornado damaged or destroyed 30 buildings near Uniontown, Alabama. Overall, the outbreak killed two and injured 30.

=== March 12 ===
FU	F0	F1	F2	F3	F4	F5
0	0	0	4	2	0	0

Several strong tornados touched down on the Southeastern United States. An F2 tornado caused widespread damage in Greeneville, Tennessee. A mother was killed and five children were injured in a small house that the tornado destroyed. An F3 tornado with twin funnels destroyed several homes and a church in Pleasant View, Kentucky, injuring five people.

== April ==
There were 150 confirmed tornadoes in the United States in April.

=== April 12–13 ===
FU	F0	F1	F2	F3	F4	F5
0	5	9	16	0	0	0

A low pressure system brought tornadoes to the central and southern United States. An isolated F2 tornado destroyed farm buildings and a water tower in and near Veteran, Wyoming. Another F2 tornado blew down and unroofed homes in Crossett, Arkansas. An F2 tornado unroofed homes and a theater and destroyed warehouses in Paragould, Arkansas, injuring two people. Yet another F2 tornado destroyed farm buildings and two small homes on a ranch near Oakwood, Texas Overall, the outbreak injured nine.

=== April 16 ===
FU	F0	F1	F2	F3	F4	F5
0	4	5	2	2	0	0

Tornadoes touched down across the Midwest and Great Plains. An F3 tornado killed two and injured 16 as it destroyed a house, a church, and trailers near Keosauqua and Birmingham, Iowa. A large F3 tornado produced near-F4 damage as it destroyed homes and barns between South Wayne and Attica, Wisconsin. An F2 tornado (rated F3 by Thomas P. Grazulis) leveled most of one house, leaving only the kitchen standing, unroofed several others, and downed radio towers near Wewoka, Oklahoma, injuring three.

=== April 21 (Midwest) ===
FU	F0	F1	F2	F3	F4	F5
0	5	14	18	3	5	0

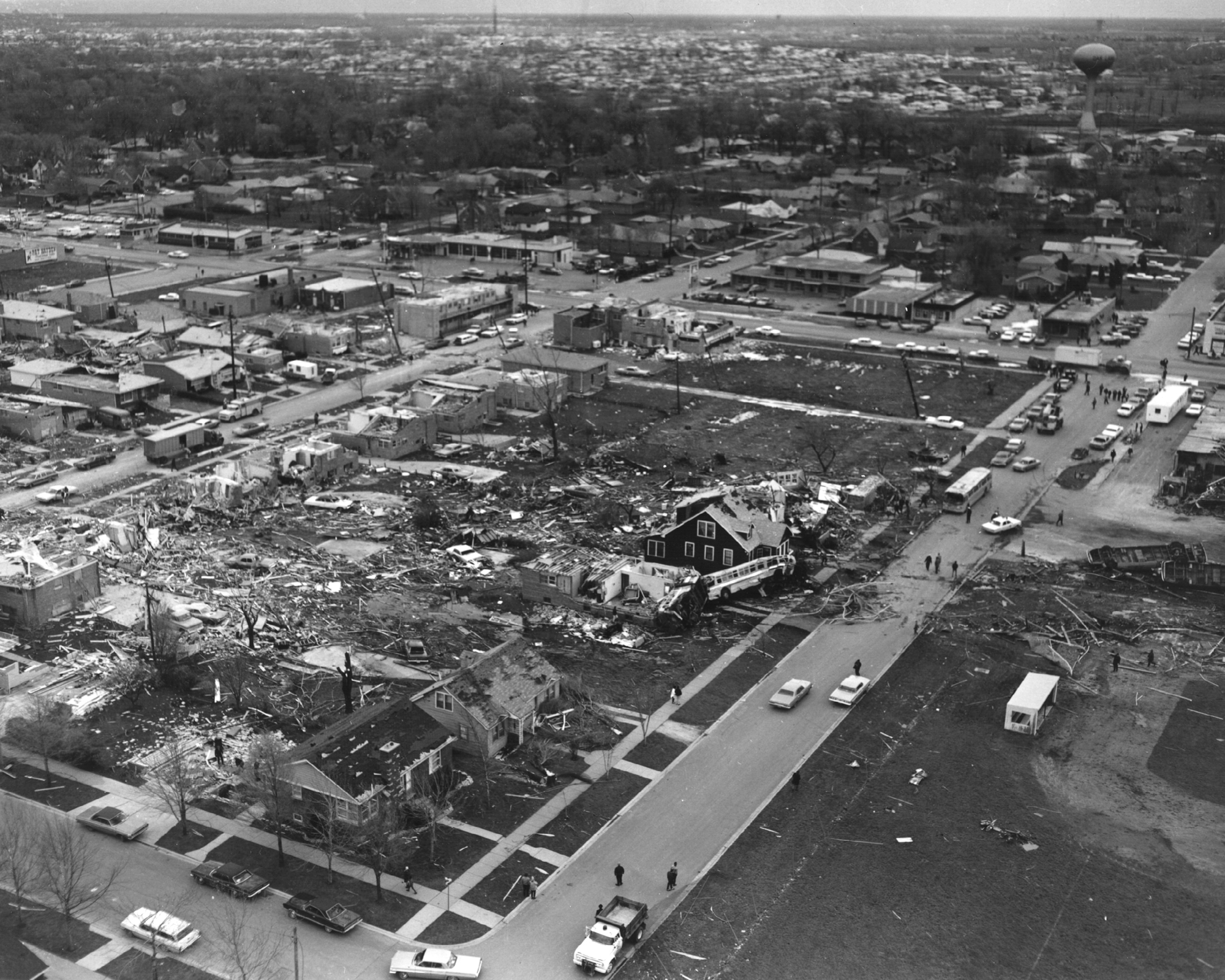
Aerial view of tornado damage in Oak Lawn.

The most significant tornado outbreak of 1967 struck the Midwestern United States, killing 58 people, all in Illinois, and injuring 1,118. The deadliest tornado of the outbreak was an F4 tornado that devastated the south side of Chicago and surrounding suburbs, killing 33 and injuring 500. The worst damage from this tornado was in Oak Lawn and Hometown, where many buildings were leveled. As the tornado struck during the Friday evening rush hour, many of the deaths were in cars that the tornado picked up and tossed at red traffic lights. Several children were killed when a skating rink was destroyed, while others died in the collapse of a super market and the destruction of trailers. The other major killer of the outbreak was an F4 tornado that devastated the south and southeastern portions of Belvidere, Illinois, killing 24 people and injuring 450. The greatest loss of life was at the Belvidere High School, where 13 people were killed and 300 were injured as the tornado struck the bus loading area as school was letting out. Most of the dead were students who were tossed by the tornado. At least seven more people were killed at a shopping center. In all, this tornado destroyed 130 homes and damaged 370. Outside Belvidere, the tornado leveled farms, but without any loss of life. One school bus was torn in half south of Harvard, but all on board took refuge in a ditch. The other killer storm of the day was an F4 tornado or tornado family that killed one and injured 100 as it struck Elgin, Lake Zurich, and Barrington Hills, Illinois. Homes were leveled at the latter location. A tornado family with a maximum rating of F4 traveled for 59 miles (95 km) across Linn, Macon and, Knox Counties in Missouri, but missed every town along its path, destroying homes and barns. Two people suffered minor injuries as their home was destroyed. The final F4 tornado of the day struck Westphalia and Fowler, Michigan, destroying three homes and damaging 18. The tornado injured eight people and killed 34 sheep. An F3 tornado tore through the south side of Grand Rapids, Michigan, destroying 65 buildings, causing major damage to another 60 and minor damage to 275. No deaths occurred but 32 people were injured.

=== April 21 (California) ===
As the outbreak in the Midwest was occurring, an F1 tornado caused considerable damage in Northwestern Madera, California.

=== April 30 – May 2 ===
FU	F0	F1	F2	F3	F4	F5
0	1	8	21	4	4	0

A low pressure system produced a tornado outbreak in the Midwest, with the most intense activity concentrated near the Iowa–Minnesota state line. The deadliest storm of the outbreak was an F4 tornado that traveled north along Minnesota State Highway 13 and through Waseca, where it cut a four-block wide damage path, destroying 16 homes, heavily damaging 25, and killing six people. Farm buildings were also destroyed north and south of the town. Another F4 tornado killed five people as it tore through Albert Lea, Clarks Grove, Ellendale and Hope, Minnesota, leveling farms along its path. The tornadoes destroyed 26 homes and badly damaged 64 in Albert Lea. One F4 tornado destroyed 10 farms near Manly, Iowa, with near-F5 damage to three of them. More farms suffered extensive damaged near Myrtle, Minnesota. Another F4 tornado passed through Worth County, Iowa, but is not mentioned by Grazulis. An F3 tornado killed two people and destroyed homes and barns as it moved from near Alden, Minnesota to near Matawan. Damage in the early part of the path was near-F4.

Over the next two days, more tornadoes struck the Southern United States, primarily in Texas and Louisiana. An F3 tornado destroyed four homes near Mittie, Louisiana, injuring two people, one of them critically. An F2 tornado injured two people as it hit Onalaska, Texas, where it tore the roof and rear wall from a store/post office. Another F2 tornado injured four people in Kaplan, Louisiana.

== May ==
There were 116 tornadoes confirmed in the US in May.

=== May 6–7 ===
FU	F0	F1	F2	F3	F4	F5
0	4	7	9	2	0	0

A pair of low pressure systems brought tornadoes to the eastern half of the United States. An F3 tornado destroyed two homes and damaged 60 homes and 30 industrial buildings on the south side of Birmingham, Alabama. One person was killed while watching the tornado. Another F3 tornado struck southeast of Maysville, Kentucky. An F2 tornado destroyed a gas station and damaged more than 70 buildings in Clay, Kentucky. Another F2 tornado damaged homes, destroyed barns, and killed livestock near Hartsville, Tennessee.

=== May 18–19 ===
FU	F0	F1	F2	F3	F4	F5
0	1	4	1	1	0	0

A low pressure system spawned six tornadoes across parts of Missouri, Iowa and southern Wisconsin on May 18, most of them weak. An F2 tornado destroyed a trailer and barns near Delafield, Wisconsin. As the system moved eastward, an isolated F3 tornado picked up a small house near Loch Lynn Heights, Maryland and threw it 100 yards (90 m) into a dairy barn, killing a person in the house.

=== May 30–31 ===
FU	F0	F1	F2	F3	F4	F5
0	8	8	3	0	0	0

Scattered tornadoes touched down from Colorado and Texas to Florida and Kentucky. Two F2 tornadoes hit Texas on May 30; one destroyed one house and tore the roof from another north of Silsbee, (Note: Both Grazulis and the Tornado History Project list this tornado in Hardin County, Texas but the Tornado History Project map places it in Rogers, Arkansas.) the other destroyed a barn and cause severe roof damage to homes in Burkburnett. One May 31, an F1 tornado destroyed a parsonage under construction, killing a carpenter and injuring a workman. An F2 tornado hit Pulaski County, Kentucky.

== June ==
There were 210 confirmed tornadoes in the United States in June.

=== June 8 ===
FU	F0	F1	F2	F3	F4	F5
0	2	3	2	0	1	0

A small tornado outbreak hit Iowa and southern Wisconsin, as well as Idaho. An F4 tornado hit a subdivision west of Fort Dodge, Iowa, leveling one home, tearing the roof from another and destroying a garage and trailer. Five people were injured.

=== June 9–14 ===
FU	F0	F1	F2	F3	F4	F5
0	42	30	26	3	2	0

From June 9–14, significant tornadoes touched down daily across portions of the Great Plains and Midwestern United States. on June 9 and F2 tornado killed a person in a car southwest of Concordia, Kansas. Another F2 tornado near Hickman, Nebraska injured two people in a car that got rolled off the road. Activity on June 10 was more intense on June 10. An F4 tornado followed a zig-zagging path east of Hammon, Oklahoma. Four people were killed and another was injured as the tornado completely destroyed a farm home. Ten other farm homes, farm equipment, and numerous outbuildings were heavily damaged or destroyed. Another F4 tornado leveled a farm east of Watonga, Oklahoma. A 30-ton transformer station was carried 150 feet (46 m) and heavy steel buildings were destroyed. An F3 tornado damaged every building in Omega, Oklahoma, with extensive damage to the local school. The superintendent was injured. An F2 tornado caused severe damage in Watonga. Two houses were destroyed and eight others were heavily damaged. Three trailers, a hangar, and five airplanes were also destroyed. Another F2 tornado traveled between Two Buttes and Walsh killed or injured about 100 cattle and injured a family of four. One house had near-F3 damage. On June 11 an F3 tornado started north of Topeka and traveled nearly 44 miles across northeastern Kansas. June 12 saw less significant tornado activity. An F2 tornado skipped parallel to the Platte River in southern Nebraska, from near Kearney to near Wood River, destroying a barn, granaries, and sheds. A brief F1 tornado (rated F2 by Grazulis) destroyed one home and damage several others on the north side of Kansas City, Missouri. Nearly all of the tornadoes on June 13 were in Nebraska. Activity was particularly intense in Buffalo and Sherman Counties, where 49 funnel clouds were sighted, of which 13 reportedly touched down. Three more F2 tornadoes struck near Kearney. One of these tornadoes (rated F3 by Grazulis) completely destroyed a farm. Another tornado destroyed all buildings on a farm except for the house. On June 14 an F3 tornado injured three people in the Akron, Iowa area. An F2 tornado south of Champion, Nebraska destroyed barns and outbuildings on a farm, injuring one person.

=== June 23 ===
FU	F0	F1	F2	F3	F4	F5
0	1	0	0	1	0	0

On June 23, an F3 tornado devastated the northern half of Garden City, Kansas, killing one person and injuring 30. More than 400 homes were damaged and about 150 had roofs and exterior walls torn off. Some homes may have been completely leveled, which would indicate F4 intensity, but this could not be confirmed. The newly built Brior Hill Subdivision was destroyed with many homes that had roofs torn off and interior walls collapsed, the water tower was damaged and the Church Of the Nazarene had its roof ripped off. Numerous trees in the worst affected areas were denuded and stripped of leaves with some slight debarking occurring to smaller trees. In additional F0 occurred in Dumas, Texas

=== June 24–25 (Europe) ===
FU	F0	F1	F2	F3	F4	F5
1	0	0	1	4	1	1

On June 24 and June 25, a major tornado outbreak occurred over parts of Northern France, the Netherlands, and Germany. In France, 4 tornadoes occurred, all of them F2 and stronger. An F2 tornado touched down, and damaged parts of Argoules, France and 2 other villages, as it traveled on a 12 km path. At 18:40 UTC, an F3 tornado touched down in Davenescourt, affecting 2 villages. At about 19:35 UTC, the most violent tornado of the year touched down in Pas-de-Calais, completely leveling and sweeping away 17 homes. The narrow F5 tornado tore through Palluel, lifting cars, and throwing houses, killing 6 people and injuring 30. The tornado then abruptly dissipated as it reached the Canal du Nord. At around 20:00 UTC, a large, violent, 1.5 mile-wide F4 wedge tornado touched down, killing 2 people and injuring 50 on a 23 km long path. In the Netherlands, two F3 tornadoes touched down near Buren and Ulicoten, killing 7 people. On June 25, another F3 tornado touched down in the Netherlands, also killing 2 people. Finally, an unrated tornado touched down near Berlin, although not much information is available about this event. However, due to the significant amount of significant tornadoes (F2 or stronger), and the fact that there were no F0 or F1 tornadoes officially confirmed, it is likely that several tornadoes were not reported.

== July ==
There were 90 confirmed tornadoes in the United States in July.

=== July 22–24 ===
FU	F0	F1	F2	F3	F4	F5
0	2	3	7	1	0	0

From July 22 through July 24, a low pressure system moved across the Great Lakes region. One July 22 an F2 tornado unroofed or destroyed about a dozen farm homes and many farm buildings across Stearns and Sherburne Counties in Minnesota. One person, trapped on the second floor of a home, was killed. Another F2 tornado destroyed barns and trailers in and around Marshfield and Spokeville, Wisconsin, injuring two people and killing 16 cattle. Two other F2 tornadoes destroyed barns in Wisconsin. On July 23 an F2 tornado passed near Camp Grove, Illinois, destroying barns and tearing a part a barn at near-F3 intensity. On July 24 an F3 tornado passed near Ashland Station and Mansfield, New York, destroying a barn, cabin, and an abandon house and killing cattle. A refrigerator was blown 700 feet (210 m). An F2 tornado hit East Fairfield, Ohio. Two people were injured when their house was destroyed. At least one barn on a turkey farm was completely destroyed and dead turkeys were carried up to 6 miles (10 km). Another F2 tornado injured two people in the Rock Creek, Ohio area.

== August ==
There were 28 tornadoes were confirmed in the U.S. in August.

=== August 1–3 ===
FU	F0	F1	F2	F3	F4	F5
0	2	4	2	1	0	0

A small, but destructive collection of nine tornadoes impacted seven states with the strongest one briefly touching down in Wisconsin, causing F3 damage, killing two, and injuring five.

== September ==
There were 139 tornadoes confirmed in the U.S. in September.

=== September 18–24 (Hurricane Beulah) ===
FU	F0	F1	F2	F3	F4	F5
0	57	49	6	8	0	0

A large, destructive outbreak of 120 tornadoes struck Texas due to landfalling Hurricane Beulah, making it largest outbreak ever generated by a tropical cyclone until Hurricane Ivan in 2004. The outbreak killed five and injured 41.

== October ==
There were 36 tornadoes confirmed in the U.S. in October.

=== October 8 (Argentina) ===
An F4 tornado struck the town of Washington in Córdoba Province, Argentina.

=== October 18 ===
An F2 tornado touched down near Mountville, Pennsylvania moving north-east hitting a school, and causing around $275,000 worth of damage and injuring five students as it tore off part of the roof, smashed windows, and threw debris around the classroom. A chicken-house near the school was leveled and several barns and homes were damaged extensively. A car was overturned on the Pennsylvania Turnpike near Middletown, and the wind picked up a moving car and headed it in the opposite direction. Two occupants were hospitalized. At Palmyra RD #1 the wind tore away some of a cinder-block machine shop and speared one of the building's beams through the convertible roof of a car.

== November ==
There were 8 tornadoes confirmed in the U.S. in November.

== December ==
There were 61 tornadoes confirmed in the U.S. in December.

=== December 1–3 ===
FU	F0	F1	F2	F3	F4	F5
0	1	1	3	2	1	0

Eight destructive tornadoes caused major damage across the Southeast, killing two and injuring 14.

=== December 10–11 ===
FU	F0	F1	F2	F3	F4	F5
0	0	10	10	2	0	0

Large outbreak of 22 tornadoes tore through the Southeastern United States and the Midwest, killing two and injuring 103.

=== December 17–21 ===
FU	F0	F1	F2	F3	F4	F5
0	3	8	13	5	1	0

A rare F1 tornado in Hawaii kicked off a violent outbreak sequence of 30 tornadoes that affected areas stretching from the Southwest through the Midwest into the Southeastern United States. Six people were killed and 110 others were injured.

== See also ==
- Tornado
  - Tornadoes by year
  - Tornado records
  - Tornado climatology
  - Tornado myths
- List of tornado outbreaks
  - List of F5 and EF5 tornadoes
  - List of North American tornadoes and tornado outbreaks
  - List of 21st-century Canadian tornadoes and tornado outbreaks
  - List of European tornadoes and tornado outbreaks
  - List of tornadoes and tornado outbreaks in Asia
  - List of Southern Hemisphere tornadoes and tornado outbreaks
  - List of tornadoes striking downtown areas
  - List of tornadoes with confirmed satellite tornadoes
- Tornado intensity
  - Fujita scale
  - Enhanced Fujita scale
