= Evergreen Park Elementary School District 124 =

School district in Illinois, United States

Address
- 2929 West 87th Street Evergreen Park, Illinois, 60805; United States

District information
- Type: Public
- Grades: PreK–8
- Superintendent: Dr. Jenna Woodland
- NCES District ID: 1714550

Students and staff
- Students: 1,916

Other information
- Website: www.d124.org

Evergreen Park Elementary School District 124 is a school district headquartered in Evergreen Park, Illinois, in the Chicago metropolitan area. It serves grades K-8. Students move on to the Evergreen Park Community High School District 231, which operates Evergreen Park High School.

== Schools ==
- Northeast Elementary School
- Northwest Elementary School
- Southeast Elementary School
- Southwest Elementary School
- Central Middle School
