= Evergreen Park, Illinois =

- Village
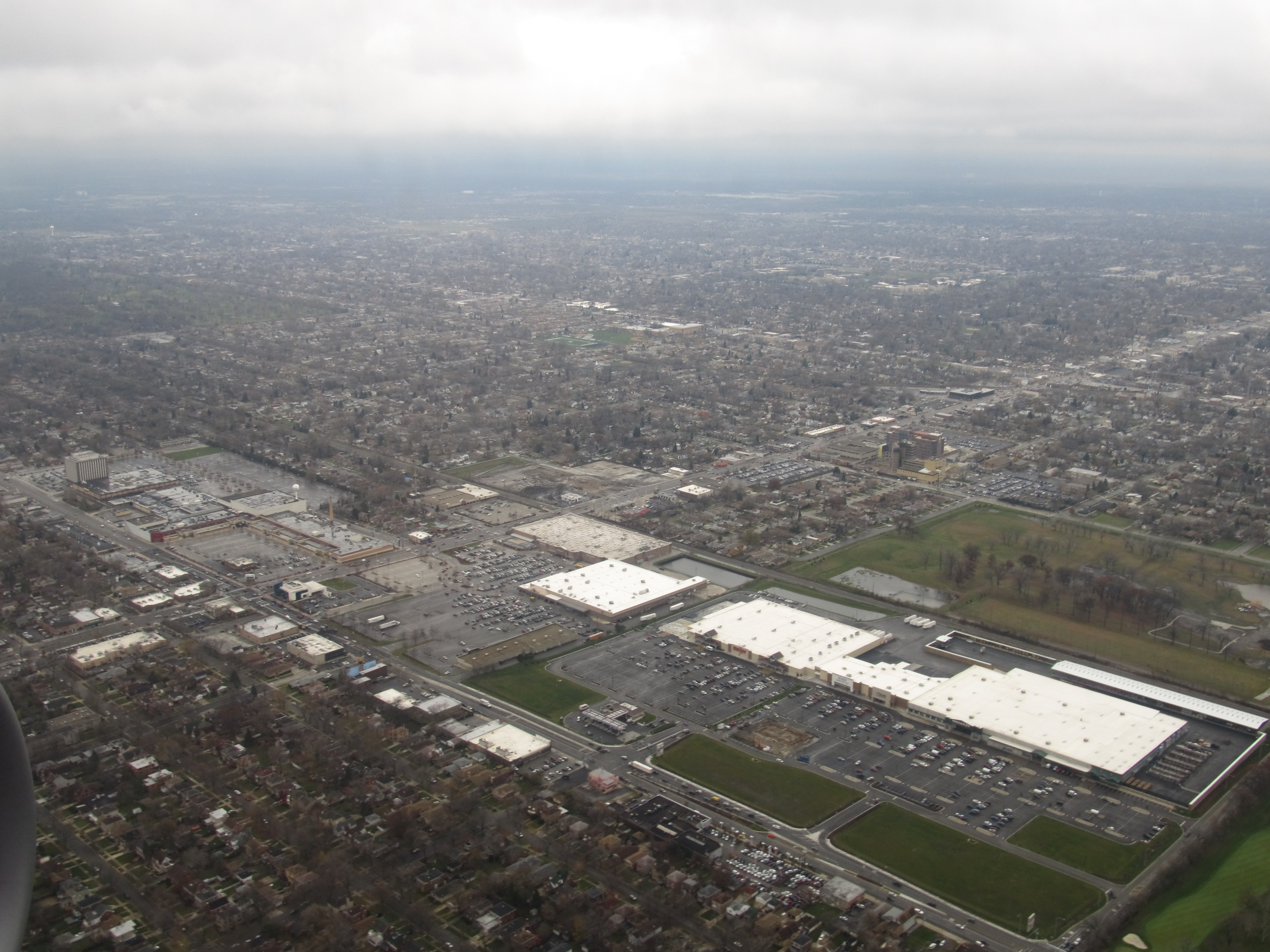
- Aerial view of Evergreen Park, Illinois, looking Southwest, over Western Avenue.

- Seal
- Motto: "The Village of Churches"
- Location of Evergreen Park in Cook County, Illinois.

- Location within Greater Chicago Location within Illinois Location within the United States
- Coordinates: 41°43′12″N 87°42′9″W
- Country: United States
- State: Illinois
- County: Cook
- Township: Worth
- Incorporated: December 20, 1893

Government
  - Mayor: Kelly M. Burke (D)

Area
  - Total: 3.16 sq mi (8.19 km^{2})
  - Land: 3.16 sq mi (8.19 km^{2})
  - Water: 0 sq mi (0.00 km^{2}) 0%

Population (2020)
  - Total: 19,943
  - Density: 6,305.9/sq mi (2,434.72/km^{2})

Standard of living (2007–11)
  - Per capita income: $28,499
  - Median home value: $219,500
- ZIP Code: 60805
- Area code: 708
- Geocode: 17-24634
- FIPS code: 17-24634
- GNIS ID: 2398846
- Website: evergreenpark-ill.com

Evergreen Park is a village and south suburb in Cook County, Illinois, United States. In 2020, the population was 19,943. The village shares a border with Chicago on the north, east, and south sides; while also sharing a border with Oak Lawn on the west side.

== History ==
As early as 1828, a German farming family had settled in the area that became Evergreen Park. In the following decades, additional German settlers arrived. Kedzie Avenue and 95th Street crossed the farmland and provided access to markets. The first railroad, that became part of the Grand Trunk Railroad, passed through the area in 1873. In 1875, the community constructed its first school just west of the intersection of 95th Street and Kedzie Avenue. This school, along with the stores that later clustered around the intersection, defined the community's central business district.

Nearby, a real estate developer, inspired by the Arc de Triomphe area of Paris, designed a star-shaped park with eight streets radiating outward. Evergreen trees planted in the park inspired the village's name. Although the park’s location and layout were intended to form the town’s center, the intersection of 95th Street and Kedzie Avenue later proved to be a more accurate midpoint. Following the death of Mayor Henry Klein shortly after the village’s 75th anniversary in 1968, the park was renamed Klein Park in his honor.

In 1888, St. Mary's Cemetery opened, and mourners traveled by train from Chicago. Restaurants and taverns were established to serve cemetery visitors. Within five years, the village developed into a recreation center that attracted hundreds of Chicago residents to its picnic groves, beer gardens, and dance halls. The first of the village's thirteen churches was established in 1893.

During the financial panic of the 1890s, several surrounding communities voted to be annexed by Chicago. Recognizing the present and future potential of its strong business district, and seeking to avoid annexation, Evergreen Park was incorporated on December 20, 1893. Prior to incorporation, the village was sustained by approximately 500 regional residents. The decision to incorporate as a separate entity from Chicago was approved by a vote of 41 out of 50 village residents. John M. Foley, a real estate and insurance agent, became the village's first mayor. The village is bordered by Chicago on the north, south, and east sides and is located 17 miles southwest of the Loop.

In 1899, shortly after incorporation, the village introduced telephone service. In 1910, gas and electric lines were extended into homes, and streetlights were installed. By 1920, most homes had indoor plumbing, although some residents continued to rely on a well located behind the village hall. In the early 20th century, many residents continued farming, and numerous open fields remained within the village limits. As a result, fire posed a constant threat, and water supplies were limited. In July 1918, a spark from a passing train ignited the original village hall, which was destroyed despite residents' efforts to extinguish the fire. A new village hall was constructed in 1920. The census that year recorded 705 residents.

In 1930, Little Company of Mary Hospital opened at 95th Street and California Avenue. Within its first year of operation, 232 babies were born there. As part of the Tornado outbreak of April 21, 1967, an F4 tornado passed through Evergreen Park. The village reached its peak population in the 1970 census, when 25,921 residents were recorded. The 2020 census recorded a population of 19,943. Evergreen Park is also known as the "Village of Churches" due to its thirteen established religious congregations located in close proximity.

=== The Plaza ===
Evergreen Plaza, located at 95th Street and Western Avenue, opened in 1952. Developed by real estate developer Arthur Rubloff, he enclosed the complex, making it the first indoor shopping mall in the Chicago area. From the 1950s onward, Evergreen Plaza underwent extensive renovations and later became commonly known as The Plaza. The mall encompassed approximately 1,200,000 square feet (110,000 m^{2}) across two stories. As of 2006, it attracted roughly 7 million visitors annually. After 61 years of operation, The Plaza closed in 2013. Its redeveloped replacement, Evergreen Marketplace, opened in 2018.

=== First successful kidney transplant ===
On June 17, 1950, Little Company of Mary Hospital was the site of the world’s first successful kidney transplantation. Richard H. Lawler, a surgeon at Cook County Hospital in Chicago, led the medical team that performed the operation, which was considered hazardous and highly controversial at the time. In preparation, Lawler spent several years researching and practicing organ transplantation, using canines as test subjects. He concluded that the most viable approach involved transplanting a human kidney from a post-mortem donor. The recipient, Ruth Tucker, a 44 year old woman with terminal polycystic kidney disease, survived for an additional five years following the procedure.

Lawler's work initially drew significant criticism, including repudiation from many colleagues and opposition from the Catholic Church. By the 1970s, as organ transplantation became widely recognized as a life-saving medical practice, Lawler and his team gained acceptance and respect within the medical community. Lawler retired in 1979 and died in 1982.

== Geography ==
Evergreen Park is located at 41°43′12″N 87°42′9″W (41.719933, −87.702499). The suburb is surrounded by the city of Chicago on three of its sides, while Oak Lawn and Hometown border it on the west. Chicago's Ashburn community is to its north, Beverly is to its east, and Beverly and Mount Greenwood are to its south.

According to the 2021 census gazetteer files, Evergreen Park has a total area of 3.16 square miles (8.18 km^{2}), all land.

U.S. Route 12 and U.S. Route 20 bisect Evergreen Park as 95th street.

== Demographics ==
Historical population
Census	Pop.	Note	%±
1900	445		—
1910	424		−4.7%
1920	705		66.3%
1930	1,594		126.1%
1940	3,313		107.8%
1950	10,531		217.9%
1960	24,178		129.6%
1970	25,921		7.2%
1980	22,260		−14.1%
1990	20,874		−6.2%
2000	20,821		−0.3%
2010	19,852		−4.7%
2020	19,943		0.5%
U.S. Decennial Census; 2010 2020

=== Racial and ethnic composition ===
Evergreen Park village, Illinois – Racial and ethnic composition Note: the US Census treats Hispanic/Latino as an ethnic category. This table excludes Latinos from the racial categories and assigns them to a separate category. Hispanics/Latinos may be of any race.
Race / Ethnicity (NH = Non-Hispanic)	Pop 2000	Pop 2010	Pop 2020	% 2000	% 2010	% 2020
White alone (NH)	17,895	13,630	10,899	85.95%	68.66%	54.65%
Black or African American alone (NH)	1,627	3,651	4,775	7.81%	18.39%	23.94%
Native American or Alaska Native alone (NH)	16	33	22	0.08%	0.17%	0.11%
Asian alone (NH)	254	227	232	1.22%	1.14%	1.16%
Pacific Islander alone (NH)	3	1	8	0.01%	0.01%	0.04%
Other race alone (NH)	19	23	95	0.09%	0.12%	0.48%
Mixed race or Multiracial (NH)	176	252	501	0.85%	1.27%	2.51%
Hispanic or Latino (any race)	831	2,035	3,411	3.99%	10.25%	17.10%
Total	20,821	19,852	19,943	100.00%	100.00%	100.00%

=== 2020 census ===
As of the 2020 census, Evergreen Park had a population of 19,943. The median age was 39.3 years. 23.7% of residents were under the age of 18 and 15.2% of residents were 65 years of age or older. For every 100 females, there were 92.1 males, and for every 100 females age 18 and over there were 87.6 males age 18 and over.

100.0% of residents lived in urban areas, while 0.0% lived in rural areas.

There were 7,259 households and 4,964 families in Evergreen Park. Of all households, 34.3% had children under the age of 18 living in them. Of all households, 47.9% were married-couple households, 15.9% were households with a male householder and no spouse or partner present, and 30.8% were households with a female householder and no spouse or partner present. About 25.2% of all households were made up of individuals and 11.3% had someone living alone who was 65 years of age or older.

There were 7,585 housing units, of which 4.3% were vacant. The homeowner vacancy rate was 1.7% and the rental vacancy rate was 5.9%.

=== Income and poverty ===
The median income for a household in the village was $79,396, and the median income for a family was $97,958. Males had a median income of $61,171 versus $43,148 for females. The per capita income for the village was $35,328. About 4.0% of families and 5.8% of the population were below the poverty line, including 5.9% of those under age 18 and 9.3% of those age 65 or over.

== Government and politics ==
Evergreen Park is in Illinois's 1st congressional district, and its congressman is Democrat Jonathan Jackson. It is also a part of Illinois's 6th congressional district, represented by Democrat Sean Casten. The village backed Barack Obama by a margin of 61.25% to 37.40% over John McCain in 2008. Evergreen Park leans moderately Democratic as John Kerry beat George W. Bush here 55.77% to 43.40% in 2004. This is slightly more Democratic than in 2000 when Bush lost to Al Gore 51.13% to 45.60% in the village. The most Republican area of the village is the Southwest quadrant which went for Bush both years. (In 2000 Bush won 51.29% to 45.24%, and in 2004, Bush won 49.91% to 49.31%.).

The current mayor of Evergreen Park is Kelly Burke.

== Transportation ==
Pace and CTA provide bus service on multiple routes connecting Evergreen Park to destinations across the Southland.

== Notable people ==
- Tom Baldwin, professional football player, New York Jets
- Chris Chelios, retired NHL and Olympic player, member of Hockey Hall of Fame, born in Evergreen Park
- Tony Cingrani, pitcher for the Los Angeles Dodgers, born in Evergreen Park
- Bil Dwyer, comedian and game show host, born in Evergreen Park
- Jenny McCarthy, Playboy playmate, actress, television host, born in Evergreen Park
- Jim Dwyer, outfielder for several Major League Baseball teams, born in Evergreen Park
- Ed Farmer, MLB pitcher (1971–83) and White Sox radio announcer, born and raised in Evergreen Park
- Ruben Gallego, United States senator from Arizona and former member of the United States House of Representatives. Gallego was raised in Evergreen Park and attended Evergreen Park Community High School.
- Rick Gorecki, MLB pitcher, born in Evergreen Park
- Tom Gorzelanny, pitcher for the Washington Nationals, attended Marist High School
- Brad Guzan, soccer player who represented the United States national team
- Wayne Huizenga, former CEO of Blockbuster; founder of AutoNation, the Florida Marlins, and the Florida Panthers; owner of the Miami Dolphins and Sun Life Stadium; born and raised in Evergreen Park.
- Mahalia Jackson, gospel singer, winner of Grammy Lifetime Achievement Award; died in Evergreen Park
- Ted Kaczynski, notorious figure better known as the Unabomber, graduated from Evergreen Park High School
- Jane Lynch, actress, comedian, and author. Born in Evergreen Park in 1960
- Scott Meyer, catcher for the Oakland Athletics
- Abbey Murphy, professional hockey player
- Maureen Murphy, chairman of the Cook County Republican Party (2002–04)
- Rasmea Odeh, convicted of immigration fraud, for concealing her arrest, conviction, and imprisonment for fatal terrorist bombing
- Rich Nugent, member of the United States House of Representatives from Florida (2011–2017). He was raised in Evergreen Park.
- Frank M. Ozinga (1914–1987), Illinois state senator and lawyer; born in Evergreen Park
- Donn Pall, pitcher for the Chicago White Sox (1988–98), raised in Evergreen Park
- David Patterson, a computer pioneer and academic, born in Evergreen Park
- Billy Pierce, pitcher, broadcaster and scout for the Chicago White Sox
- Bill Rancic, television personality; born in Evergreen Park
- Lou Pote, MLB pitcher, born in Evergreen Park
- Kevin Sullivan, former White House Communications Director, born and raised in Evergreen Park
- Joseph C. Szabo, 12th Administrator of the Federal Railroad Administration (2009–2015). He was born in Evergreen Park.
- John Tumpane (born 1983), baseball umpire
- Mike Wengren, drummer for metal band Disturbed

== Schools ==
It is located within the Evergreen Park Elementary School District 124 and the Evergreen Park Community High School District 231.

Public schools:

- Northeast Elementary
- Northwest Elementary
- Southeast Elementary
- Southwest Elementary
- Central Middle School
- Evergreen Park Community High School

Private schools:

- Most Holy Redeemer School
- Queen of Martyrs

Brother Rice High School, Mother McAuley High School, and St. Rita High School are all private schools located in Chicago in close proximity to Evergreen Park. St. Xavier University also borders Chicago and Evergreen Park.

== Notable events ==
Evergreen Park Little League hosted the 2009 Little League State Championship. The event was broadcast on Comcast.
