= Evergreen Park Community High School District 231 =

Evergreen Park Community High School

Location
- 9901 South Kedzie Avenue; Evergreen Park, Illinois 60805; United States
- Coordinates: 41.713°N 87.701°W

Information
- Type: Public High School
- Motto: Once a Mustang, Always a Mustang
- Established: 1954
- School district: Evergreen Park Community High School District 231
- Superintendent: Tom O'Malley
- Principal: Matt Dugan
- Faculty: 58.3 (on FTE basis)
- Grades: 9-12
- Enrollment: 851 (2020-21)
  - Grade 9: 227 students
  - Grade 10: 209 students
  - Grade 11: 231 students
  - Grade 12: 184 students
- Average class size: 22
- Student to teacher ratio: 15.9
- Campus size: 20 acres (8.1 ha)
- Area: South Suburbs
- Campus type: Suburban
- Colors: Green; Grey
- Athletics conference: South Suburban
- Nickname: Mustangs
- Accreditation: Illinois State Board of Education
- Newspaper: Mustang Monitor
- Feeder schools: Evergreen Park Elementary School District 124; Most Holy Redeemer School; Queen of Martyrs School; St. John Fisher School
- Website: www.evergreenpark.org

Evergreen Park Community High School, is a public high school located in Evergreen Park, Illinois southwest of Chicago. The high school has about 950 students in grades 9–12.

Students originate from the Evergreen Park Elementary School District 124.

== History ==
The school's first superintendent, Marshall G. Batho, announced the opening of Evergreen Park Community High School (EPCHS) on September 6, 1955. The school's overall construction consisted of three phases that expanded through 1953–1963, with the completions of each phase in 1955, 1957, and 1963.

After opening its doors in 1955, the school quickly reached capacity as the small suburb experienced a major unexpected population boom during the decade. In a span for only two years, and during the initial planning and construction phase, the population spiked 3,985 people (between 1954 and 1956). In 1950, according to the census, the town's population was listed as 10,400, but by the spring of 1956, Evergreen Park's population ballooned to nearly 20,000 residents.

On May 5, 1963, at the cost of $1,285,000, the board of education of district 231 announced an open house for the new 2-story wing addition to the original buildings. The wrap-around architectural design, created by Perkins and Willis, preserved the athletic fields to the east of the school, saved available parking, eliminated noise from Kedzie Ave, shielded the classrooms from the afternoon sun, and created a hexagon cafeteria positioned in the center of the building with a court yard view. Upon completion, the project unified the building and doubled the size of the school by expanding the lay out to 193,830 square feet of usable space with a capacity to serve 1,400 students.

In 1965, Evergreen Park voters approved a $495,000 bond issue to build a year-round swimming pool addition to be built on the southeast corner of the high school. However, the construction was contingent on a proposed 21-cent tax hike that was initially defeated. The pool was eventually built and opened in 1969.

On April 6, 1962, the school hosted a talk on genetics by Nobel laureate and president of the University of Chicago George W. Beadle.

The boundaries of District 231 are with coterminous the Village of Evergreen Park: Pulaski Avenue on the west, 87th Street on the north, Western Avenue on the east, and 103rd Street on the south between Central Park and California.

== Athletics ==
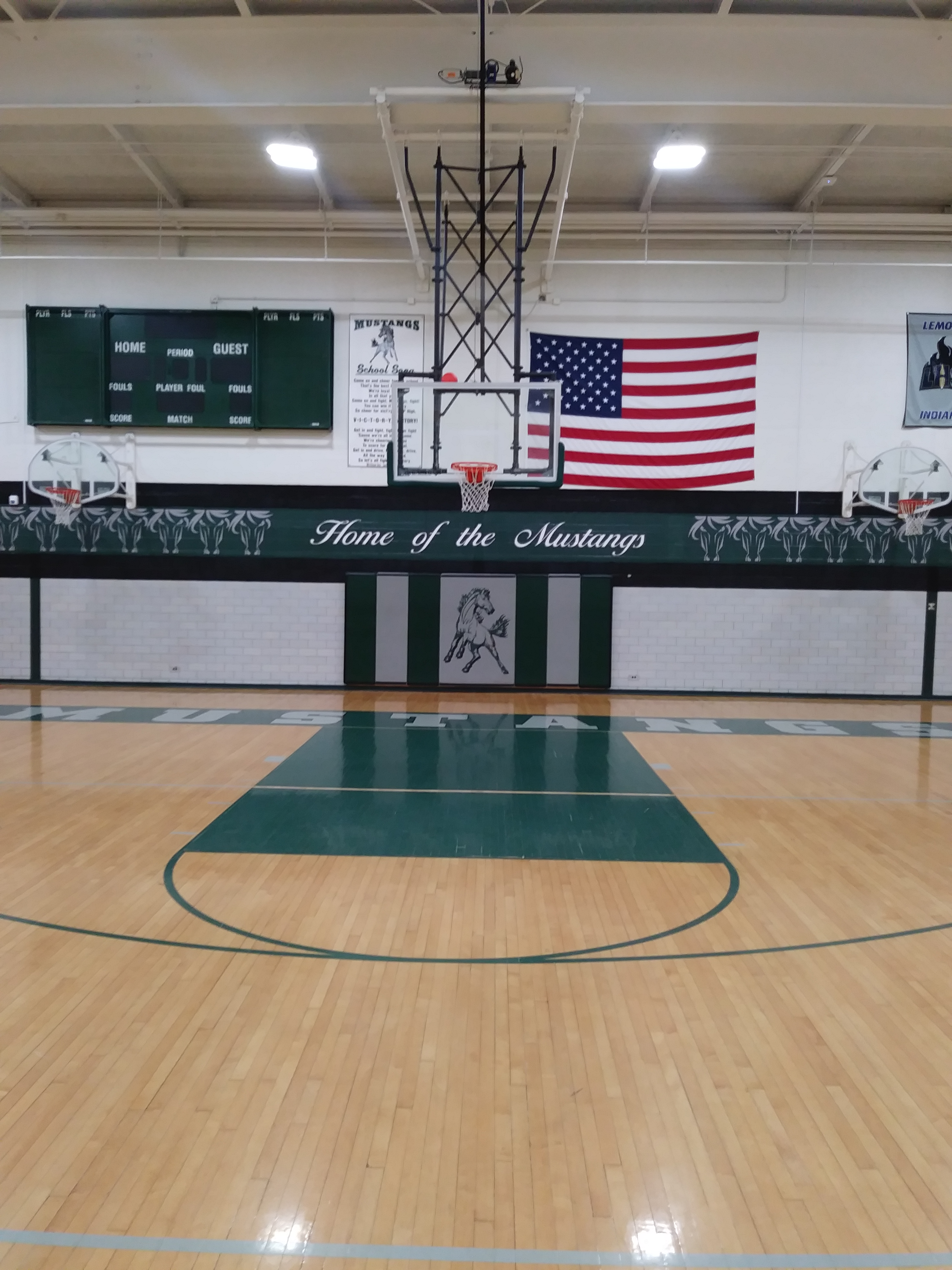
EPCHS main gymnasium

Evergreen Park competes in the South Suburban Conference (SSC), and is a member of the Illinois High School Association (IHSA), the body which governs most athletics and competitive activities in the state. School colors are Green and Grey. Teams are stylized as the Mustangs.

Evergreen Park sponsors interscholastic teams for young men and women in Basketball, Bowling, Cross Country, Soccer, Swimming, and Track.Young women may compete in Cheerleading, Dance, Softball, and Volleyball, while young men may also compete in Baseball, Football, Golf, and Wrestling.

The following teams have finished in the top four of their respective IHSA sponsored state tournament.

- Esports: 4th place overall (2023) *Notable Coach Daniel Truffa leading the team to an excellent place*
- Bowling (Girls): 3rd place (1976–77, 1977–78, 1980–81); 4th place (1978–79)
- Softball: 4th place (1985–86)
- Cross Country (Girls): Placed 3rd in conference (2009, 2010) Regional Champions (2010)
- Football: Undefeated champions Southwest Suburban Conference (1964) 8–0.

Prior to being sponsored by the IHSA, the girls' water polo team won the state championship from 1980 to 1985, finishing second in 1986.

== Notable alumni ==
- Jim Adduci, former MLB player
- Ruben Gallego, politician
- Drew Griffin, Emmy and Peabody award-winning investigative journalist for CNN
- David Kaczynski, anti-death penalty activist and brother of Ted Kaczynski
- Ted Kaczynski, also known as the "Unabomber," terrorist, mathematician and writer
- Donn Pall, former MLB player (Chicago White Sox, Philadelphia Phillies, Chicago Cubs, New York Yankees, Florida Marlins)
