= Frank M. Ozinga =

American lawyer and politician (1914-1987)

Frank M. Ozinga (August 30, 1914 – November 22, 1987) was an American lawyer and politician.

Born in Evergreen Park, Illinois. Ozinga went to Chicago High School and to the Central YMCA College. In 1938, Ozinga received his law degree from Chicago–Kent College of Law and was admitted to the Illinois bar. Ozinga served in the United States Navy during World War II. He served as an assistant Illinois Attorney General and as an assistant probate judge. Ozinga was involved with the Republican Party. From 1957 to 1983, Ozinga served in the Illinois State Senate. He served as chairman of the board directors of the First National Bank of Evergreen. Ozinga died in a hospital in Evergreen Park, Illinois.
