= 1967 Belvidere tornado =

1967 tornado in Illinois, U.S.

- The tornado near Belvidere.

Meteorological history
- Formed: April 21, 1967, 3:50 p.m. CDT (UTC−05:00)
- Dissipated: April 21, 1967, 4:25 p.m. CDT (UTC−05:00)
- Duration: 35 minutes

F4 tornado
- on the Fujita scale
- Highest winds: 207–260 mph (333–418 km/h)

Overall effects
- Fatalities: 23 (+1–5 indirect (Note: Includes one who suffered a heart attack as the tornado was ongoing. Four additional victims were either "killed or seriously injured" by damaged electrical infrastructure in Belvidere))
- Injuries: 450–500 (Note: Potential injury tolls from the Belvidere tornado are as follows: · Storm Data: 450 · National Weather Service: 500 · Grazulis: 500^{:482})
- Damage: 22 million (1993 USD, $49,032,000 adjusted; estimate from 1993^{:482})
- Areas affected: Boone County, Illinois
- Part of the Tornado outbreak of April 21, 1967 and tornadoes of 1967

On the afternoon of April 21, 1967, a violent tornado tracked through Belvidere, Illinois, United States. The tornado struck just after students at the city's high school had been dismissed, as they were loading onto school buses. Many were flipped over and lofted, and the school itself sustained major damage. Throughout Belvidere, hundreds of homes suffered major damage, as did multiple businesses, in addition to the Chrysler plant and one of the city's two hospitals. 23 were killed directly by the storm, 13 of whom died at the high school alone. Past Belvidere, the tornado—which may have been a tornado family of multiple tornadoes following a single path—would strike another school bus in rural McHenry county before dissipating. Recovery was slowed down by snowfall days later. The tornado was one of three in Illinois to receive an F4 rating on the Fujita scale during the April 21 tornado outbreak.

== Background ==
Across northern Illinois, the previous winter had been particularly intense. The 1967 Chicago blizzard that January brought record-breaking amounts of snow to the region, with as much as 68.4 in (174 cm) falling in Chicago. Snow cover remained until March 9, 42 days after the blizzard. As springtime approached, the region had been in the midst of an intense heatwave, with temperatures at Rockford reaching 80 °F (27 °C), and temperatures in Chicago exceeding 70 °F (21 °C) from April 13 to 17, 5 consecutive days.

== Meteorological synopsis ==
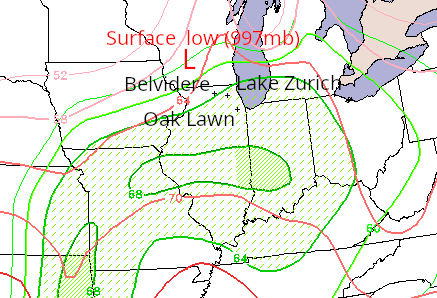
Surface analysis of northern Illinois during the Oak Lawn tornado outbreak. Highlighted fields include temperature (red contours), dew points (green contours and shaded), and low centers (annotated)

On April 21, a strong jet stream was in place from the Southwestern United States to the Great Lakes region, and a strong shortwave trough moved northeast from the Southwest region. This trough spawned a surface low developed near the Great Plains and moved eastward along a stationary warm front, which was located between the low center and north of Chicago. Illinois experienced widespread temperatures between 66–74 °F (19–23 °C). The jet stream's maximum speed at 250 millibars, high in the atmosphere, reached 120 knots (140 mph; 220 km/h) over the upper Great Lakes region, with much of northeastern Illinois being placed in the right rear sector, favorable for the development of intense thunderstorms. An existing line of storms that had caused wind damage and several tornadoes in Iowa and Missouri spawned strong rotating supercells as it entered northern Illinois.

In advance of the expected severe weather, the Belvidere Assembly Plant showed their workers a movie about tornado preparedness. The facility noted that dark clouds had been appearing at 3:30 p.m., (Note: All times are given in CDT (UTC—5), unless otherwise specified) and at 3:45 p.m., particularly heavy rains prompted the plant to notify the sheriff's department. The Belvidere tornado was the first of three violent F4 tornadoes to strike northern Illinois that day; over the next couple of hours, two more would strike Lake Zurich and Oak Lawn, causing over 600 casualties between them, while seven other tornadoes—3 rated F2, and 4 rated F1—would be recorded across the region from the April 21 event.

== Tornado summary ==
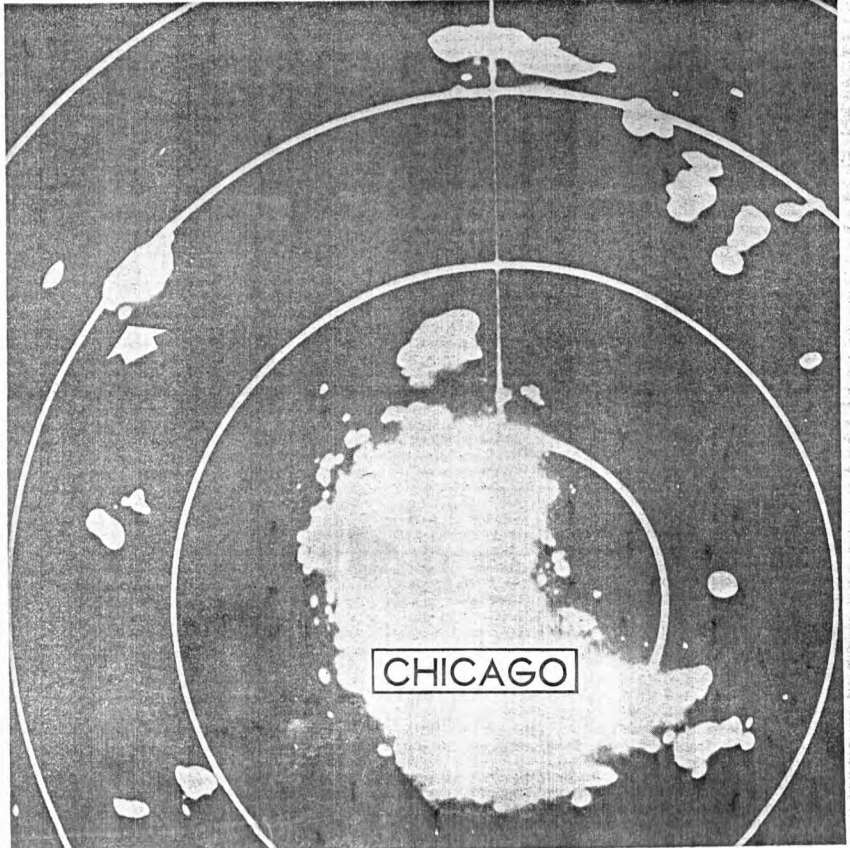
WSR-57 image highlighting the Belvidere tornado at peak intensity

The tornado touched down southeast of Cherry Valley near the border of Winnebago and Boone counties at 3:50 pm., and immediately began moving towards Belvidere. As the tornado approached the city, it passed by the Belvidere Assembly Plant, a manufacturer of Chrysler vehicles. Here, 300 newly manufactured vehicles, in addition to 100 cars owned by employees, were destroyed. Dutch Whalen, a Belvidere police captain and later Mayor, was made aware of the report of the tornado at the assembly plant, and immediately began driving towards Belvidere High School with his vehicle-mounted siren activated. His vehicle ended up in a ditch, but he continued towards the school on foot while shouting to alert those there about the danger. Belvidere High School took a direct hit, with clocks stopping at 3:50 p.m. Students had been loading onto buses following class dismissal as the tornado struck. Twelve buses were flipped over, and multiple students were thrown into an open field, which a later account from the Chicago National Weather Service office described as being "like leaves [flung] into the muddy field". One survivor recalls being inside of a bus that had been lofted into a residence:

My older sister was in one of the last cars to get out of the parking lot at Belvidere High School. My younger brother and I were on a school bus. We were on 8th St just down from the high school. The tornado picked up the bus and the bus ended up in someone's living room.

Police captain Whalen recalls seeing "houses being blown off their foundation" and buses being rolled multiple times over. Inside the school, almost all large windows at the library were blown in. At the parking lot behind the school, over 100 cars were moved from their original positions. In all, 13 students and staff were killed and a further 300 were injured at the high school alone.

Throughout Belvidere, the tornado caused damage to numerous businesses and institutions. At Highland Hospital, one of only two in Belvidere, the surgery wing took a direct hit. All but four windows at the hospital had been broken. Businesses destroyed included DeWane's Livestock Pavilion, a Pacemaker store, and a Poulter Implement; 7 were killed at a single shopping center struck by the tornado.^{:482} Roughly 130 residences were destroyed, and another 370 were damaged.^{:482} Multiple eyewitness accounts of the tornado state that green skies were present over Belvidere during and after the tornado passed.

Further along the tornado's track, south of Harvard, the tornado struck a school bus on a highway in McHenry County. The driver and 20 students successfully sheltered in a nearby ditch. The bus was found split in half around 1 mi (1.6 km) down the road, according to one survivor, who claims the driver, Boyd Jones, got all of the students off of the bus before the tornado struck.

=== Mechanism ===
It is disputed whether or not the Belvidere tornado was a single tornado. WREX reports that the tornado was on the ground for only three minutes. Tornado historian Thomas P. Grazulis lists the tornado as a tornado family—an event in which a tornado event consists of multiple individual tornadoes along a single path^{:viii}—of which the family extended for 28 mi (45 km), from southeast of Cherry Valley to north of Woodstock, and all fatalities coming from Belvidere. Grazulis recorded $20 million in damage from Belvidere and $2 million from rural areas, for a total of $22 million (1993 USD, $49,032,000 adjusted).^{:482} The National Weather Service lists it as a single tornado, on the ground for 26.6 mi (42.8 km) across Boone and McHenry counties. The path width is listed as 800 yd (730 m) in a report on the Oak Lawn outbreak, however a 2022 compilation of tornadoes in the collar counties lists the width as 2 mi (3.2 km). In the Storm Data publication of April 1967, the tornado is listed as having a path length of 28 mi (45 km), while having an average forward speed of 50 mph (80 km/h) over a lifespan of 35 minutes, spending only 6% of its lifespan in Belvidere.

== Aftermath ==
Mike Doyle described this image of survivors of the tornado outside of Belvidere High School as "one of the most well-known disaster photos in history"

Highland Hospital in Belvidere, itself damaged by the tornado, was used to treat victims of the storm initially, treating a total of 75, before being evacuated at around 7:00 p.m. due to fears of the building's structural integrity. St. Joseph's Hospital in Belvidere reached full capacity, with further patients being transported to hospitals in Rockford. Widespread gas leaks were found by rescue teams over Belvidere following the storm, with rescue workers instructed to avoid using cigarettes. The Illinois National Guard was deployed to the city, and Governor of Illinois Otto Kerner Jr. toured damage across Belvidere on April 22.

Belvidere was declared a federal disaster area by president Lyndon B. Johnson, alongside other areas struck during the April 21 tornado outbreak.

=== Belvidere High School ===
At the high school, following the tornado's passage, numerous survivors recall seeing students covered in mud, some having pieces of debris such as road tar ingrained into their skin. Survivors recall doors from around the building had been removed from their hinges and used as stretchers to transport the deceased to the gym, where a "makeshift morgue" had been established for the dead. Injured students and staff were put on tables outside of the gym, before being taken to hospitals across Belvidere and neighboring Rockford. As of 2015, the Tornado Project, headed by Thomas P. Grazulis, ranks the 13 fatalities at Belvidere High School as the sixth deadliest tornado event at a school and the worst after 1955.

J.W. Kelley, a State Farm insurance agent, stated that damage from the tornado was "far worse" than that of the Crystal Lake, Illinois tornado from the 1965 Palm Sunday tornado outbreak.

Two days following the tornado, on April 23, 3 in (7.6 cm) of snow fell over northern Illinois, which impeded recovery efforts. A marriage license from Belvidere dated to 1910 was discovered 70 mi (110 km) away in South Milwaukee, Wisconsin, a week after the tornado.

=== Damage survey ===
The 1967 tornado occurred before the introduction of the Fujita scale used to rate tornadoes in the United States—though the tornado was recorded in the Storm Data publication of April 1967, which described the rough extent and nature of the tornado without assigning an objective rating. When the Fujita scale was introduced, the National Severe Storms Forecast Center (NSSFC, later Storm Prediction Center), in association with the Nuclear Regulatory Commission, began an effort to establish a climatology of United States tornadoes based on ratings on the new scale; thus, the NSSFC enlisted students in Illinois to analyze reports in the state using the aforementioned Storm Data entry and other databases, alongside local news reporting, to determine ratings for each tornado reported. In addition, the creator of the scale, Ted Fujita, conducted his own survey of the Belvidere tornado's impacts. The tornado earned a rating of F4 on the new scale, based on the damage the tornado caused.

=== Fatalities ===
The tornado resulted in 23 direct fatalities across Belvidere in the short time it was over the city. In addition, a person observing the tornado suffered a heart attack as the storm passed. Of the deceased, 13 died at the high school. After the tornado, 4 more were killed or seriously injured by fallen power lines.

=== Legacy ===
In 2007, 40 years after the tornado, at Belvidere High School, a memorial statue was unveiled, bearing the names of the victims of the tornado. The monument features 25 rings; 24 for those killed by the tornado, and 1 for those otherwise affected by it. A 2024 BuzzFeed list ranked Belvidere as one of their "57 "Creepy" US Towns", with the 1967 tornado being cited as a primary cause. After a March 2023 tornado outbreak produced an EF1 tornado in Belvidere, which prompted the collapse of the Apollo Theatre during a concert with 260 in attendance, Belvidere mayor Clinton Morris stated that the main takeaways from both that tornado and the 1967 tornado was the importance of warnings ahead of a storm:

Sometimes, when you don't have events for a long period of time, you get a little complacent, and nobody ever thinks that it may happen here ... But it can, and it has ... I think the best remembrance from either of these events is that we learn that the alarms, the warnings, they're for a reason.

The book The 1967 Belvidere tornado, written by historian and Rockford Register Star columnist Mike Doyle, focuses on the tornado. It was one of two books written by Doyle on the event. In 2011, after hearing of the short warning time following the tornado in Tuscaloosa, Alabama, Mike Doyle wrote that the Belvidere tornado had no warning at all. The first tornado warning for Boone County hadn't been issued until 4:03 p.m., 13 minutes after the tornado struck Belvidere; by that point, it had exited Boone County entirely. A 2014 draft for Boone County's potential hazard mitigation plan states that if the tornado struck in the modern day, it would be expected to produce an estimated $96 million (2014 USD, $130,559,000 adjusted) in damage, when using a model incorporating data from 2013.

The Belvidere tornado was the subject of a 10-minute-long documentary film, entitled Tornado 67, by Lack of Sleep Films. Tornado 67 won Best Documentary Short at the Chicago Shorts film festival.

== See also ==
- 1990 Plainfield tornado, another unwarned tornado in northern Illinois that struck a school
- 2011 Joplin tornado, a devastating tornado that caused similar institutional damage
- 2015 Rochelle–Fairdale tornado, a violent tornado that dissipated south of Belvidere
- Tornado preparedness
- List of schools struck by tornadoes
