= Donn Pall =

American baseball player (born 1962)

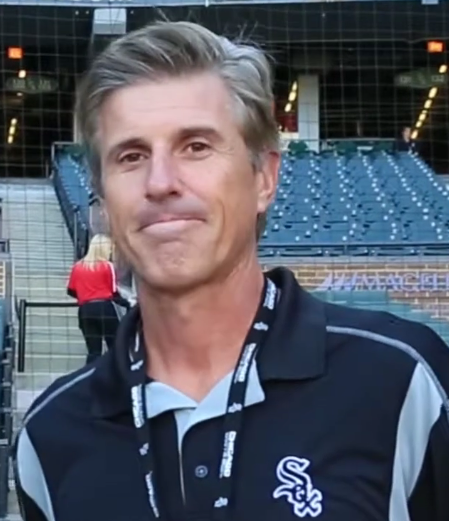
- Pall in 2017
- Pitcher
- Born: January 11, 1962 (age 64); Chicago, Illinois, U.S.
- Batted: Right Threw: Right

MLB debut
- August 1, 1988, for the Chicago White Sox

Last MLB appearance
- September 27, 1998, for the Florida Marlins

MLB statistics
- Win–loss record: 24–23
- Earned run average: 3.63
- Strikeouts: 278
- Stats at Baseball Reference

Teams
- Chicago White Sox (1988–1993); Philadelphia Phillies (1993); New York Yankees (1994); Chicago Cubs (1994); Florida Marlins (1996–1998)

Donn Steven Pall (born January 11, 1962), nicknamed "the Pope", is an American former professional baseball player who pitched in Major League Baseball (MLB) from 1988 to 1998. Pall graduated from Evergreen Park High School in 1980. He later pitched for the University of Illinois. While in college he was a member of Phi Sigma Kappa fraternity. Since retirement from pitching he has worked as a Community Relations Representative for the White Sox.

Pall was on the mound when the Phillies clinched the National League East in 1993. Because he was acquired too late in the season, however, he was not on the postseason roster.

Pall grew up a White Sox fan and saw the team clinch the Western Division title in 1983. He won a championship in 1997 with the Florida Marlins. He is currently a stock broker and investment advisor.
