= Oak Lawn Community High School =

Location
- 9400 Southwest Highway; Oak Lawn, Illinois 60453; United States
- 41.7216°N 87.7677°W

Information
- School type: Public Secondary
- Opened: 1952
- School district: Oak Lawn Comm. HS 229
- Superintendent: Dr. Shahe Bagdasarian
- Principal: Dr. Lauren May
- Teaching staff: 112.20 (FTE)
- Grades: 9–12
- Gender: coed
- Enrollment: 1,862 (2023–2024)
- Average class size: 24
- Student to teacher ratio: 16.60
- Campus type: Suburban
- Colors: Kelly Green; White
- Athletics conference: South Suburban Conference
- Mascot: Sparty the Spartan
- Nickname: Spartans
- Newspaper: Spartanite
- Yearbook: Shield
- Website: http://www.olchs.org

Oak Lawn Community High School, is a public four-year high school in Oak Lawn, Illinois, in the Chicago metropolitan area. The name "Spartans" and the colors Kelly Green and White were chosen by a committee in tribute to the Michigan State University Spartans, who won the Rose Bowl in 1954.

The school, as a part of Oak Lawn Community High School District 229, serves sections of Oak Lawn, Bridgeview, Chicago Ridge, and Hometown.

== Academics ==
In 2009, OLCHS had an average composite ACT score of 20.2, and graduated 91.6% of its senior class. The school has not made Adequate Yearly Progress (AYP) on the Prairie State Achievement Examination, which is the state assessment used to fulfill mandates of the federal No Child Left Behind Act. Overall, the school failed to meet minimum standards in reading and mathematics, in addition to having two student subgroups fail to meet expectations in reading, and one subgroup fail to meet expectations in mathematics.

== Athletics and Clubs ==
Oak Lawn competes in the South Suburban Conference (SSC) and is a member of the Illinois High School Association (IHSA); the organization which governs most sports and competitive activities for high schools in the state. Teams are stylized as the Spartans.

The school sponsors interscholastic teams for young men and women in basketball, bowling, cross country, soccer, swimming & diving, track & field, volleyball, speech, and theater. Young men may compete in baseball, football, and wrestling, while young women may compete in badminton, cheerleading, golf, softball, and tennis. There is also a coed bass fishing team. While not sponsored by the IHSA, the school also sponsors a poms team for young women.

The following teams have won or placed top four at their respective IHSA sponsored state championship tournament or meet:

- Basketball (Boys): 2nd Place (1970–71)
- Badminton (Girls): 2nd Place (1976–77)
- Drama: State Champions (2005–06, 2009–10, 2011–12, 2012–13, 2013–14, 2014–15, 2020–21); 2nd Place (1958–59, 2003–04, 2004–05, 2007–08, 2010–11, 2016–17); 3rd Place (2006–07, 2015–16, 2018–19, 2022–23); 4th Place (2017–18, 2024–25)
- Group Interpretation: State Champions (2003–04, 2007–08, 2010–11, 2013–14, 2015–16, 2018–2019, 2020–21); 2nd Place (2023–24); 3rd Place (2005–06, 2025–26); 4th Place (2002–03, 2006–07, 2011–12, 2016–17, 2021–22)
- Speech: State Champions (2009–10); 2nd Place (2011–12, 2022–23); 3rd Place (1996–97, 1998–99, 2001–02); 4th Place (1999–00, 2004–05, 2013–14, 2015–16)
- Volleyball (Boys): State Champions (1993–94); 4th Place (1992–93)
- Volleyball (Girls): 2nd Place (1976–77)
- Wrestling (Boys): 2nd Place (1958–59, 1973–74)

The Oak Lawn Community High School Spartans currently play their home games at Napleton Field.

== Notable alumni ==
- Peter Crombie, actor
- Benn Jordan, musician known as "The Flashbulb"
- Steve Kmak, bassist for the heavy metal band Disturbed
- C. J. Kupec, basketball player who played for the University of Michigan and professionally in the NBA (1975–78); he was honored as one of "100 Legends" of the IHSA Boys Basketball Tournament
- Rob Mackowiak, Major League Baseball player who played for the Pittsburgh Pirates, Chicago White Sox, San Diego Padres, and Washington Nationals
- Kitty Menendez, Miss Oak Lawn 1962 and also the victim and mother of notorious brothers and killers Erik and Lyle Menendez, whose crimes were highly publicized in 1989
- Tim Purpura, general manager of the Houston Astros (2004–07)
- William A. Reiners, ecologist
- Jeff Rowe, director
- Numayr Sweis, amateur wrestler known as "Traffic Jam Sweis". He was inducted into the 2023 First Bank Wrestling Hall of Fame
- Dave Wills, sportscaster who the radio voice of Major League Baseball's Tampa Bay Rays from 2005 until his death in 2023

== Notable faculty ==
- Edward Maloney, Illinois state senator (2003–2013).
