= Hometown, Illinois =

City in Cook County, Illinois, US

- City
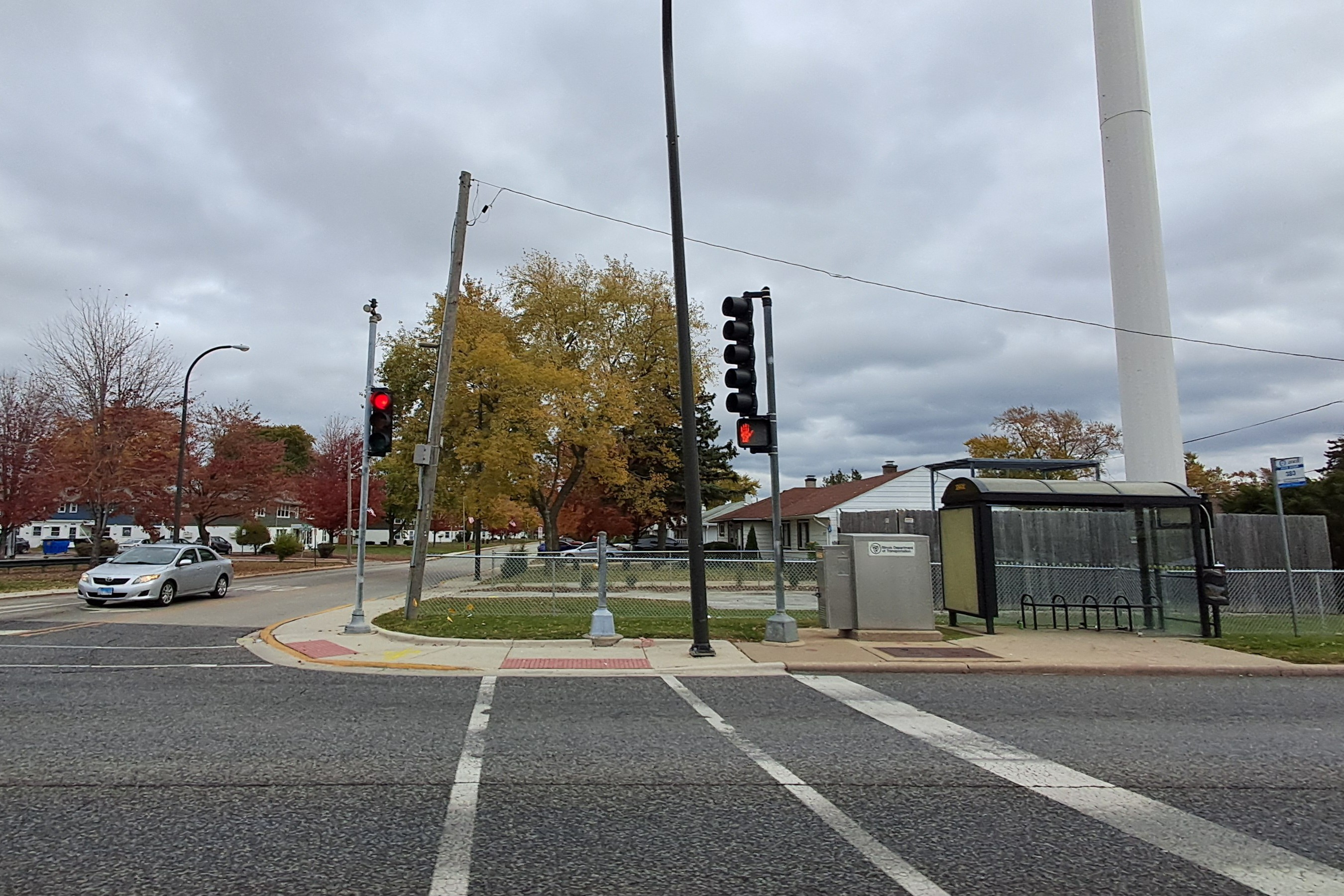
- 88th Street at Illinois Route 50 (Cicero Avenue), November 2025

- Seal

- Location of Hometown in Cook County, Illinois.

- Location within Greater Chicago Location within Illinois Location within the United States
- Coordinates: 41°43′50″N 87°43′55″W
- Country: United States
- State: Illinois
- County: Cook
- Township: Worth
- Incorporated: 1953

Government
  - Type: Mayor–council
  - Mayor: Frank Finnegan

Area
  - Total: 0.48 sq mi (1.24 km^{2})
  - Land: 0.48 sq mi (1.24 km^{2})
  - Water: 0 sq mi (0.00 km^{2}) 0%
- Elevation: 623 ft (190 m)

Population (2020)
  - Total: 4,343
  - Density: 9,068.7/sq mi (3,501.46/km^{2})

Standard of living (2007-11)
  - Per capita income: $21,626
  - Median home value: $150,000
- ZIP code(s): 60456
- Area code(s): 708
- Geocode: 35866
- FIPS code: 17-35866
- Website: www.cityofhometown.org

Hometown is a city in Cook County, Illinois, United States. The population was 4,343 at the 2020 census.

== History ==
Joseph E. Merrion developed inexpensive duplex houses in Hometown after World War II, targeting former GIs and their families. Hometown incorporated in 1953, and its population peaked at over 7,000 in 1958. On April 21, 1967, an F4/F5 rated tornado tore through Hometown, devastating the area, and destroying 86 homes while damaging 500 others.

== Geography ==
According to the 2021 census gazetteer files, Hometown has a total area of 0.48 square miles (1.24 km^{2}), all land.

Hometown borders the city of Chicago along 87th Street between Cicero Avenue and Pulaski Road. The town's southern border is located one-half mile south of 87th, where 91st Street would be.

== Demographics ==
=== Racial and ethnic composition ===
Hometown city, Illinois – Racial and ethnic composition Note: the US Census treats Hispanic/Latino as an ethnic category. This table excludes Latinos from the racial categories and assigns them to a separate category. Hispanics/Latinos may be of any race.
Race / Ethnicity (NH = Non-Hispanic)	Pop 2000	Pop 2010	Pop 2020	% 2000	% 2010	% 2020
White alone (NH)	4,234	3,665	2,979	94.78%	84.27%	68.59%
Black or African American alone (NH)	0	38	86	0.00%	0.87%	1.98%
Native American or Alaska Native alone (NH)	7	11	7	0.16%	0.25%	0.16%
Asian alone (NH)	13	14	38	0.29%	0.32%	0.87%
Pacific Islander alone (NH)	0	0	2	0.00%	0.00%	0.05%
Other race alone (NH)	3	1	16	0.07%	0.02%	0.37%
Mixed race or Multiracial (NH)	39	32	97	0.87%	0.74%	2.23%
Hispanic or Latino (any race)	171	588	1,118	3.83%	13.52%	25.74%
Total	4,467	4,349	4,343	100.00%	100.00%	100.00%

=== 2020 census ===
As of the 2020 census, Hometown had a population of 4,343. There were 1,878 households and 1,945 housing units at an average density of 4,060.54 per square mile (1,567.78/km^{2}). The population density was 9,066.81 inhabitants per square mile (3,500.71/km^{2}), and there were 955 families residing in the city.

The median age was 42.2 years. 19.5% of residents were under the age of 18 and 17.5% of residents were 65 years of age or older. For every 100 females there were 89.1 males, and for every 100 females age 18 and over there were 84.3 males age 18 and over.

100.0% of residents lived in urban areas, while 0.0% lived in rural areas.

Of the city's households, 26.7% had children under the age of 18 living in them. 33.9% were married-couple households, 20.7% were households with a male householder and no spouse or partner present, and 37.6% were households with a female householder and no spouse or partner present. About 35.2% of all households were made up of individuals, and 16.3% had someone living alone who was 65 years of age or older. The average household size was 3.42 and the average family size was 2.41.

Of the 1,945 housing units, 3.4% were vacant. The homeowner vacancy rate was 1.4% and the rental vacancy rate was 2.6%.

Historical population
Census	Pop.	Note	%±
1960	7,479		—
1970	6,729		−10.0%
1980	5,324		−20.9%
1990	4,769		−10.4%
2000	4,467		−6.3%
2010	4,349		−2.6%
2020	4,343		−0.1%
U.S. Decennial Census; 2010 2020

=== Income and poverty ===
The median income for a household in the city was $51,487, and the median income for a family was $63,523. Males had a median income of $39,034 versus $30,449 for females. The per capita income for the city was $24,378. About 1.5% of families and 6.0% of the population were below the poverty line, including 2.2% of those under age 18 and 15.6% of those age 65 or over.

== Parks and recreation ==
Hometown's city department of Parks and Recreation maintains community parks and other public recreation facilities, including Unity Park, Anderson Park, Patterson Park and baseball fields, and Hammond Hall, a community center and events venue.

== Government ==
Hometown is located in the 1st district for the Cook County Board of Review, the 11th district on the Cook County Board of Commissioners, and the 3rd judicial subcircuit. The 2011 redistricting places Hometown in Illinois's 3rd congressional district, Illinois's 16th legislative district, and Illinois's 31st house district. Public education is provided by Oak Lawn-Hometown School District 123, Oak Lawn Community High School, and Moraine Valley Community College. The Hometown Fire Protection District, which is coterminous with the municipality, provides fire protection services.

For the purposes of elections, Hometown is split into three precincts; Worth Township 47, Worth Township 53, and Worth Township 82. In the 2020 presidential election, Hometown cast 995 votes for Joe Biden and Kamala Harris (51.6%) and cast 908 votes (47.1%) for Donald Trump and Mike Pence. Twenty-four voters chose third-party candidates and thirteen voters pulled a ballot, but abstained from voting for any candidate for president. Voter turnout was 66.5%.

== Transportation ==
Bus service is provided by Pace Route 383 and CTA Route 87. Metra's SouthWest Service trains run through Hometown, but do not stop.
