= June 2022 Chicago supercell =

Exceptionally powerful thunderstorm in Illinois, US

- NEXRAD loop of the supercell's evolution as it moved through the Chicago metro.

Meteorological history
- Formed: June 13, 2022

Tornado family
- Tornadoes: 2
- Max. rating: EF0 tornado

Supercell
- Highest winds: 95 mph (153 km/h) in Bellwood, Illinois
- Max. rainfall: 1.42 in (3.6 cm) near Algonquin, Illinois
- Part of the Weather of 2022

On June 13, 2022, an exceptionally high-topped and powerful supercell impacted the Chicago metropolitan area, with a height of 60,000–70,000 ft (18–21 km) as measured by multiple NEXRAD sites. The system, spawned from an extremely unstable environment, brought widespread severe downburst winds exceeding 80 mph (130 km/h) across Cook and DuPage counties, leading to numerous flight delays and cancellations at O'Hare International Airport. The supercell was part of the same complex of storms that produced a powerful derecho across Indiana and Ohio, where wind gusts reached 98 mph (158 km/h) at Fort Wayne International Airport. The entire storm event caused a total of 3.4 billion dollars of damage.

== Meteorological synopsis ==
Satellite loop of a supercell near Chicago producing heavy lightning on June 13, 2022.

The Storm Prediction Center had outlined an Enhanced (3/5) risk for severe activity in the Great Lakes region and Ohio Valley, with forecasters predicting the formation of storms producing large hail, severe wind, and an infrequent tornado threat. The risk area was centered around Fort Wayne, Indiana, with the surrounding region being upgraded to a Moderate (4/5) risk at the 3 p.m. outlook. At this time, a lone supercell had developed over southern Wisconsin, which was expected to transition into an outflow-driven storm. This was predicted to produce a cold pool which would fuel the development of a multi-cell mesoscale convective system, as atmospheric instability in the northern Ohio Valley exceeded 5000j/kg.

At 5:38 p.m. CDT, the SPC issued Mesoscale Discussion #1148 over Northeastern Illinois, addressing the presence of updrafts fueling thunderstorms near the border of Wisconsin and Illinois, moving southeast. The environment ahead of these storms was expected to be extremely unstable, with CAPE values exceeding 4000–5000j/kg, and very strong 0–1km helicity values of around 200m^{2}s/^{2} taken by the Romeoville National Weather Service office at Lewis University Airport. Estimated Significant Tornado Parameter (STP) values around the Chicago Metropolitan Area reached 6, indicating a very favorable environment for powerful supercells, potentially producing strong or violent tornadoes.

== Confirmed tornadoes ==
Two tornadoes were confirmed from the supercell, both brief and weak.

List of confirmed tornadoes
EF#	Location	County / Parish	State	Start Coord.	Time (UTC)	Path length	Max width
EF0	Streamwood	Cook	IL	42.05°N 88.18°W	17:13	.2 mi (0.32 km)	30 yd (27 m)
EF0	A brief tornado caused damage exclusively to trees in Streamwood.						
EF0	Roselle	Cook, DuPage	IL	41.99°N 88.07°W	17:27	2.2 mi (3.5 km)	25 yd (23 m)
EF0	A brief tornado formed in Cook County, sporadically damaging trees and at one point the roof on a restaurant, before crossing into DuPage county, causing further tree damage.						

== Impact ==
O'Hare International Airport recorded a wind gust of 84 mph (135 km/h), the joint strongest gust recorded at the airport. Travellers at the airport were instructed to shelter in place until an all-clear notice was issued at 7:02 p.m. CDT, and a total of 584 flights were delayed, with 96 more being cancelled, many due to the severe conditions. As many as 67,638 Commonwealth Edison customers lost power in northeastern Illinois.

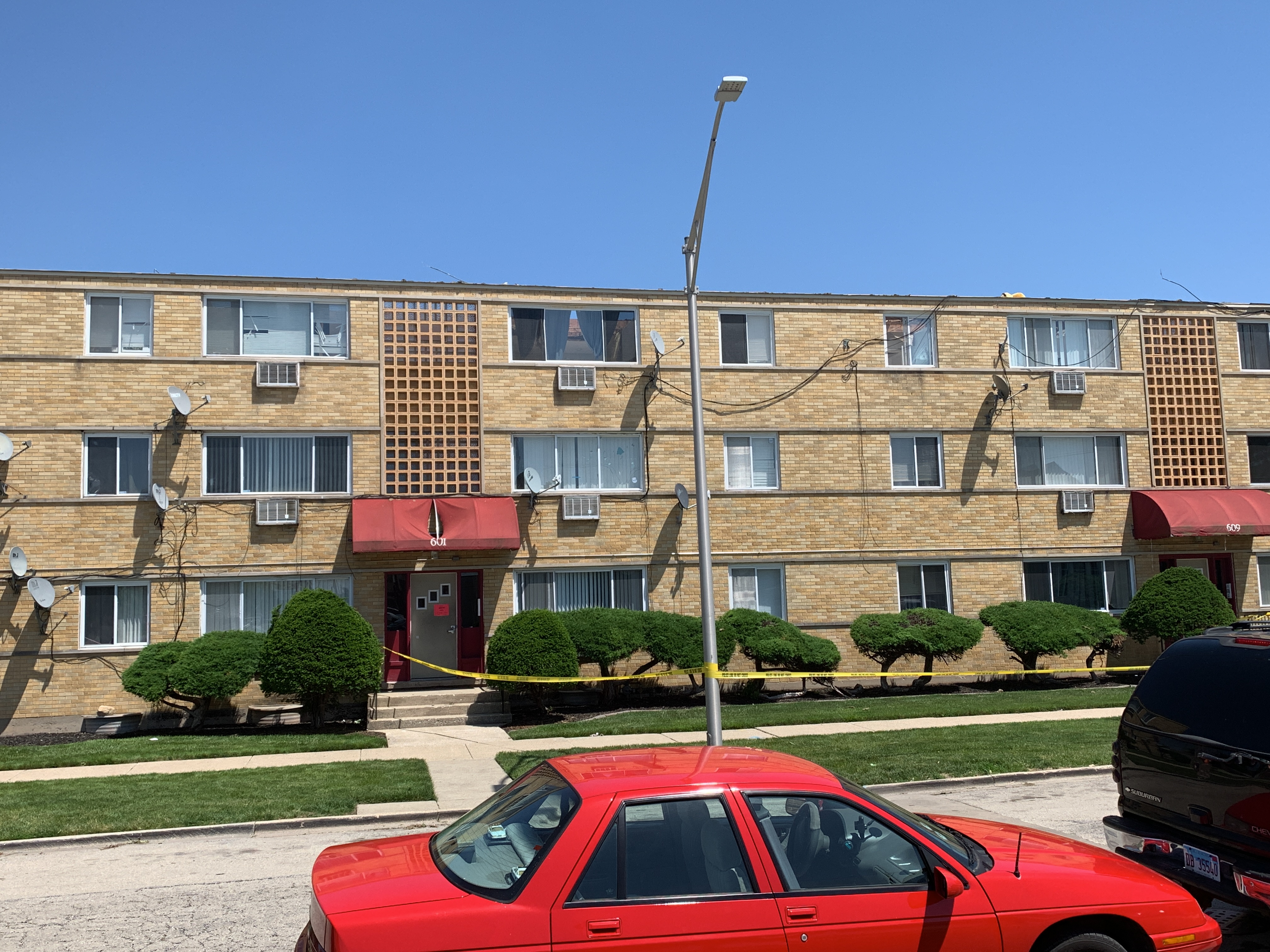
An apartment complex that lost its roof in Bellwood, Illinois. Wind estimated at 95 miles per hour.

Widespread tree and power line damage occurred across the region. Severe wind damage occurred in Bellwood, where an apartment complex had its roof ripped off. Following the storm's impacts in Chicago, a tree fell on and destroyed one home in Porter County, Indiana. A baseball game between the Chicago Cubs and San Diego Padres at Wrigley Field was delayed by 1 hour and 25 minutes due to rain, during which tornado sirens were sounded.

The next day, Metra suspended the BNSF Line at the Chicago Subdivision as multiple trees had fallen on the rails between Congress Park and Riverside. Up to 40,000 ComEd customers reported outages, potentially affecting up to 4 million users.

Coinciding with the storm, a strong early-season heat event led to a heat index value of 115 °F (46 °C) at Joliet Regional Airport. The heat was the most intense experienced in the region since 2012.

== Aftermath ==
On June 23, local suburban city heads signed a memorandum of understanding to participate in the Cross-Community Climate Collaborative, a regional initiative to become carbon-neutral by 2050.

The storm had coincided with the landing of American Airlines flight 151 from Paris Charles de Gaulle, which experienced extreme turbulence. In 2024, one passenger brought a lawsuit to the airline, alleging that they had been thrown out of their seat and suffered severe injuries that had not fully healed two years later.

== Cloud height ==
The Chicago NWS office stated that the storm had an exceptionally high peak cloud height. Neighboring NWS radar sites detected a peak height of above 60,000 ft (11 mi; 18 km) and potentially as high as 65,000–70,000 ft (12.3–13.3 mi; 20–21 km), well above the normal height for convective thunderstorms in the mid-latitudes. The tallest thunderstorm officially recorded was near Nueva Rosita, Coahuila in 2016, reaching 68,000 ft (12.9 mi; 21 km) over the Rio Grande basin of Mexico.

== See also ==
- Severe weather sequence of July 13–16, 2024, a series of damaging wind events that greatly affected the region
- August 2020 Midwest derecho, a historic derecho that brought similar effects to the region
- Tornado outbreak of July 28–29, 2021, a damaging wind event that affected the region a year prior
- 1967 Oak Lawn tornado outbreak, described as "Northern Illinois' worst tornado disaster"
- 1990 Plainfield tornado, a violent tornado in the Chicago suburbs that followed a similar motion vector
- 2021 Naperville–Woodridge tornado, a tornado that had affected the Chicago suburbs the year prior
- Climate of Chicago
- Weather of 2022
