= Tornadoes in Chicago =

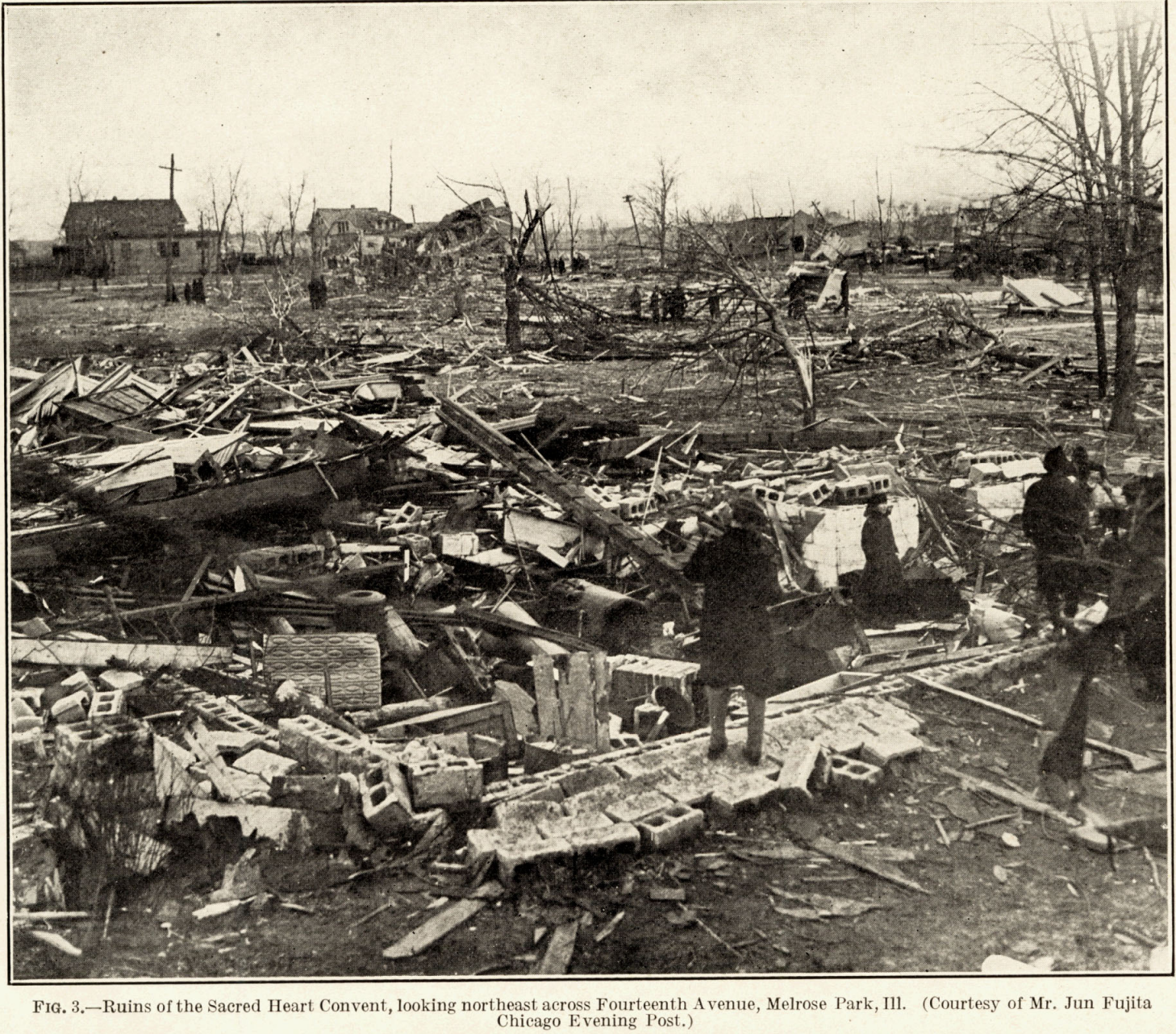
Damage at a church in Melrose Park following an F4 tornado on March 28, 1920

Tornadoes have struck Chicago multiple times. Chicago, the largest city in Illinois and the third largest in the United States, lies in an area susceptible to severe weather year-round, with the Romeoville National Weather Service office providing continuous severe weather outlooks for Chicago and surrounding regions. The city has been struck by multiple tornadoes, including the devastating 1967 Oak Lawn tornado which struck the South Side in 1967, and a multiple vortex tornado that struck the Loop in 1876. Studies of tornadoes in the region show that as Chicago's suburbs grow, they become more susceptible to tornadoes, with the strongest tornado in the region striking Plainfield in 1990. Chicago was also the home of the severe weather researcher Ted Fujita, a professor at the University of Chicago, who extensively contributed to the scientific model of the tornado. The first tornado on record in Illinois, which struck modern-day Des Plaines, led to correspondence between a Chicago newspaper and the Smithsonian Institution, the efforts of which across the country eventually gave rise to the creation of the National Weather Service.

== Study ==
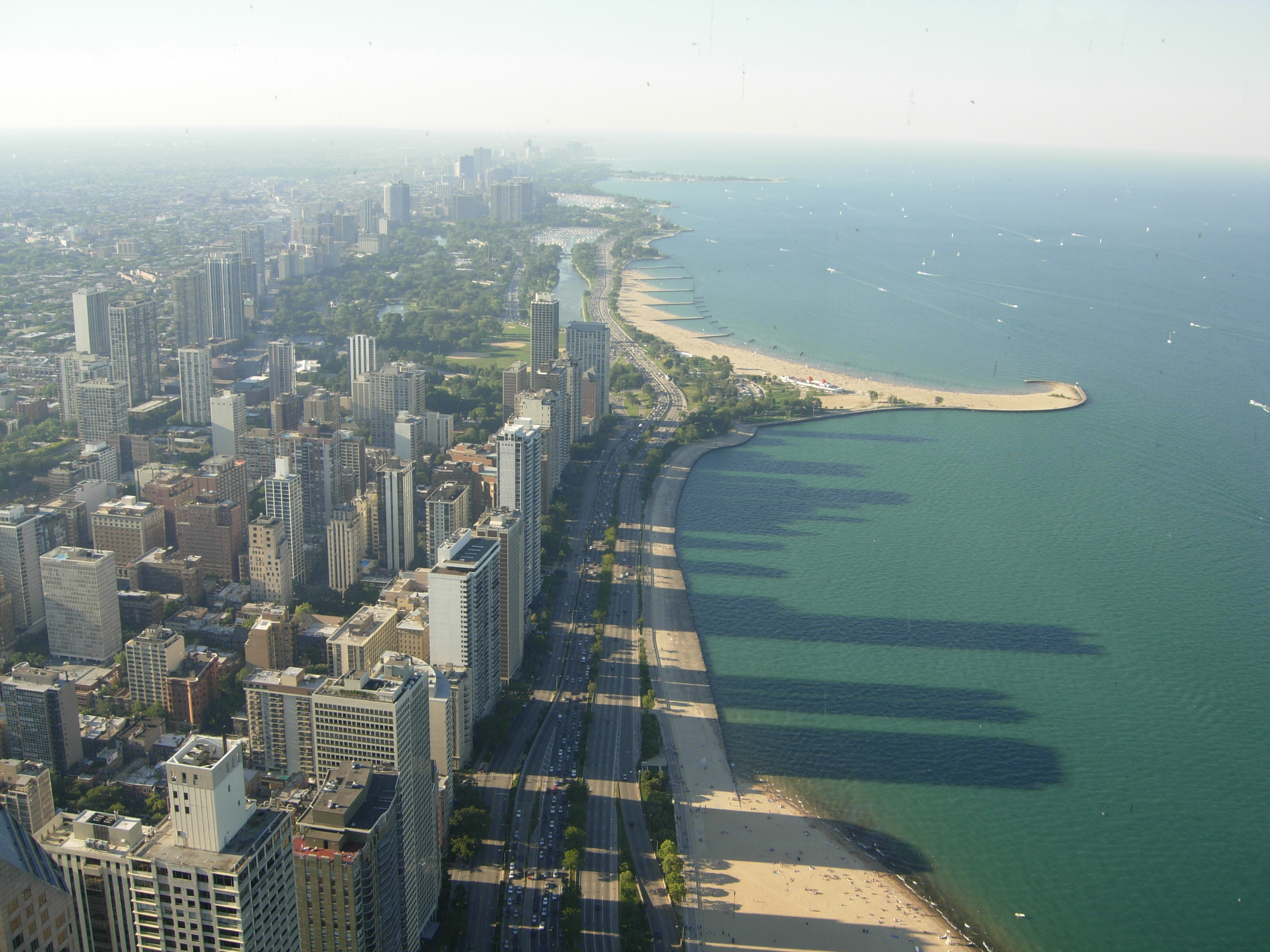
The myth that Lake Michigan "protects" or otherwise deters tornadoes in the city of Chicago is incorrect, as is the myth that skyscrapers in the city prevent tornadoes.

A regional myth states that Lake Michigan protects Chicago from tornadoes; this is not true, and while the relatively cooler air coming off the lake can influence some tornadoes, others have been seen forming near the lakefront and some have moved over the lake itself. Another myth states that urban development and Chicago's tall buildings protect the city from tornadoes; buildings have a negligible effect on the formation and path of a tornado.

Ted Fujita was the lead figure for tornado science and research, and was a professor at the University of Chicago. His research included comparing the intensity of tornadoes to the damage patterns of the atomic bombings of Hiroshima and Nagasaki, furthering the theory of the downburst pattern of damaging winds, and developing the Fujita scale for ranking tornadoes based on the damage they cause. Following the Plainfield tornado in 1990, Fujita said that a tornado in the Chicago Loop, the most developed part of the city, couldn't be ruled out:

We should not assume a false sense of security in our city ... A large, violent tornado might manage to smash through the Loop, damaging skyscrapers and causing showers of window-glass onto the streets.

A study by National Weather Service Chicago, Illinois found that a violent (F4–F5) (Note: Except where official ratings are assigned, F-scale ratings in this section will be considered equivalent to EF-scale ratings.) tornado strikes the Chicago metropolitan area on average once every 9.8 years, with F3 and F2 tornadoes much more common at once every 4.5 and 1.3 years on average respectively. A majority of both deaths and injuries caused by tornadoes in the area were the result of F4 tornadoes, with a large amount of total fatalities in the region originating on just three days – March 28, 1920, April 21, 1967, and August 28, 1990. The study concludes by stating that "[t]he Chicago area is overdue for a major tornado", while also mentioning that, as rural areas are developed into populated places, more people are at risk of the impacts of a tornado.

In a second study analyzing local storm reports between 2001 and 2020, the National Weather Service determined the time of year when severe weather happened based on the amount of days on which a severe weather report occurs in the Chicago region. The study found that there are on average three days with reports of severe weather between the months of May and August, with tornado days specifically occurring most commonly in May and June. Days with damaging wind events were found to be most common in June and July. Severe weather typically occurs between 1 and 9 p.m. local time, with tornadoes being especially common between 4 and 8 p.m. local time. The study also found that only about 5% of tornadoes in the region are rated F3 or higher, with only 1.6% being rated F4 to F5. An apparent increase in tornado reports between 1960 and 2020 was attributed to increased access to electronic means to report severe weather, a higher population in the Chicago and Rockford metropolitan areas, and the rise of trained volunteer storm spotters. An apparent decrease in the amount of days with significant tornadoes, those rated F2 or above, from about two every year to only one, was attributed to improved building codes.

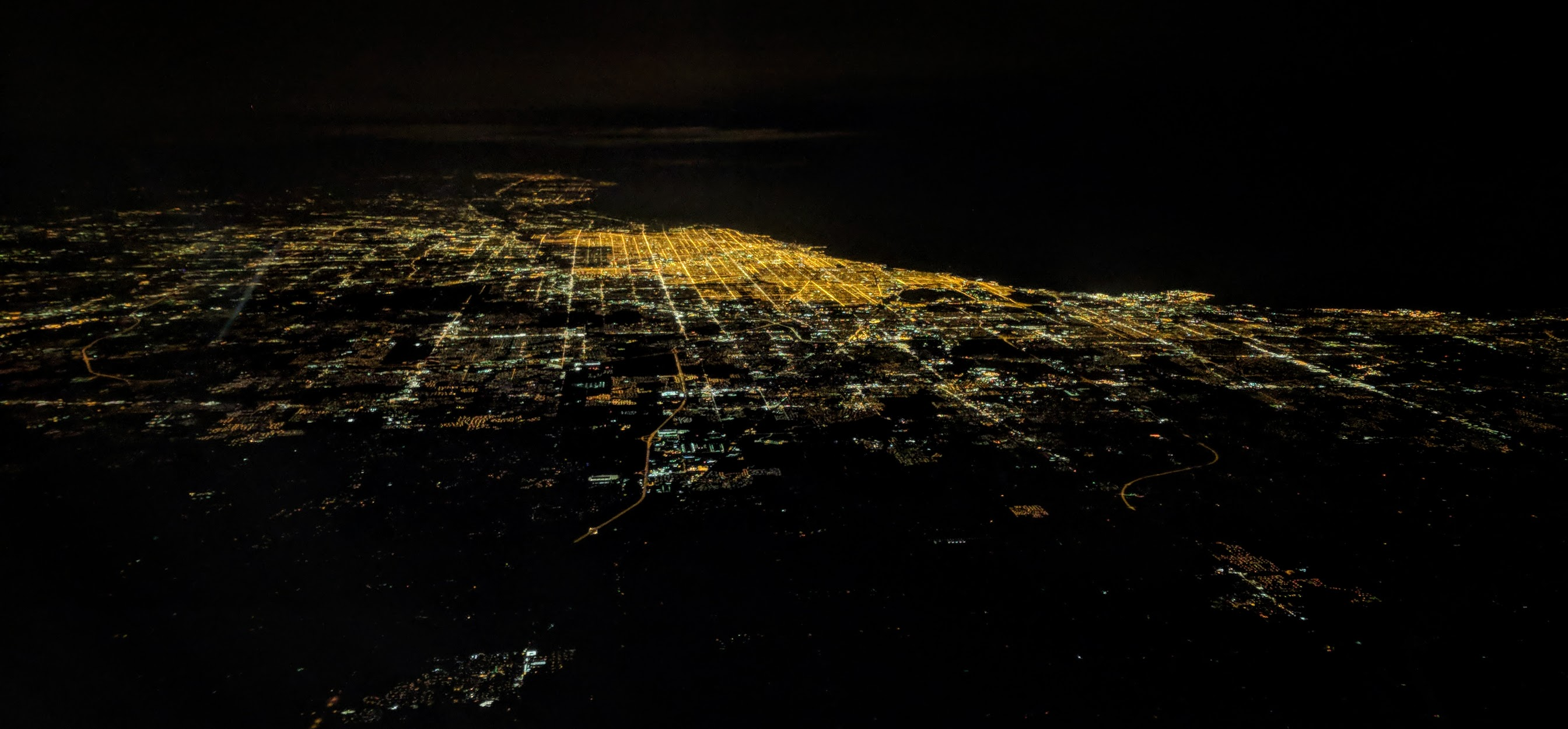
Ashley et al. have concluded that as Chicago's suburban and exurban areas expand, the number of people at risk of the impacts of a tornado increases.

A 2014 study by Ashley et al. attempted to quantify the increasing risk of a tornado based on the development of suburban and exurban areas in the Chicago area using synthetic tornado paths, influenced by historical tornadoes including the 2011 Joplin tornado. A hypothetical "worst case" scenario was determined to impact as many as 200,000 people with direct tornadic intensity, whereas the overall population at risk of a tornado was increasing significantly with time, especially expanding high-density suburban development in the Chicago metropolitan area, in what was dubbed an "expanding bull’s-eye effect". The highly dense risk exposure that exists in Chicago's central business district could pose a "catastrophic disaster potential" due to critical infrastructure being overwhelmed.

== Preparations ==
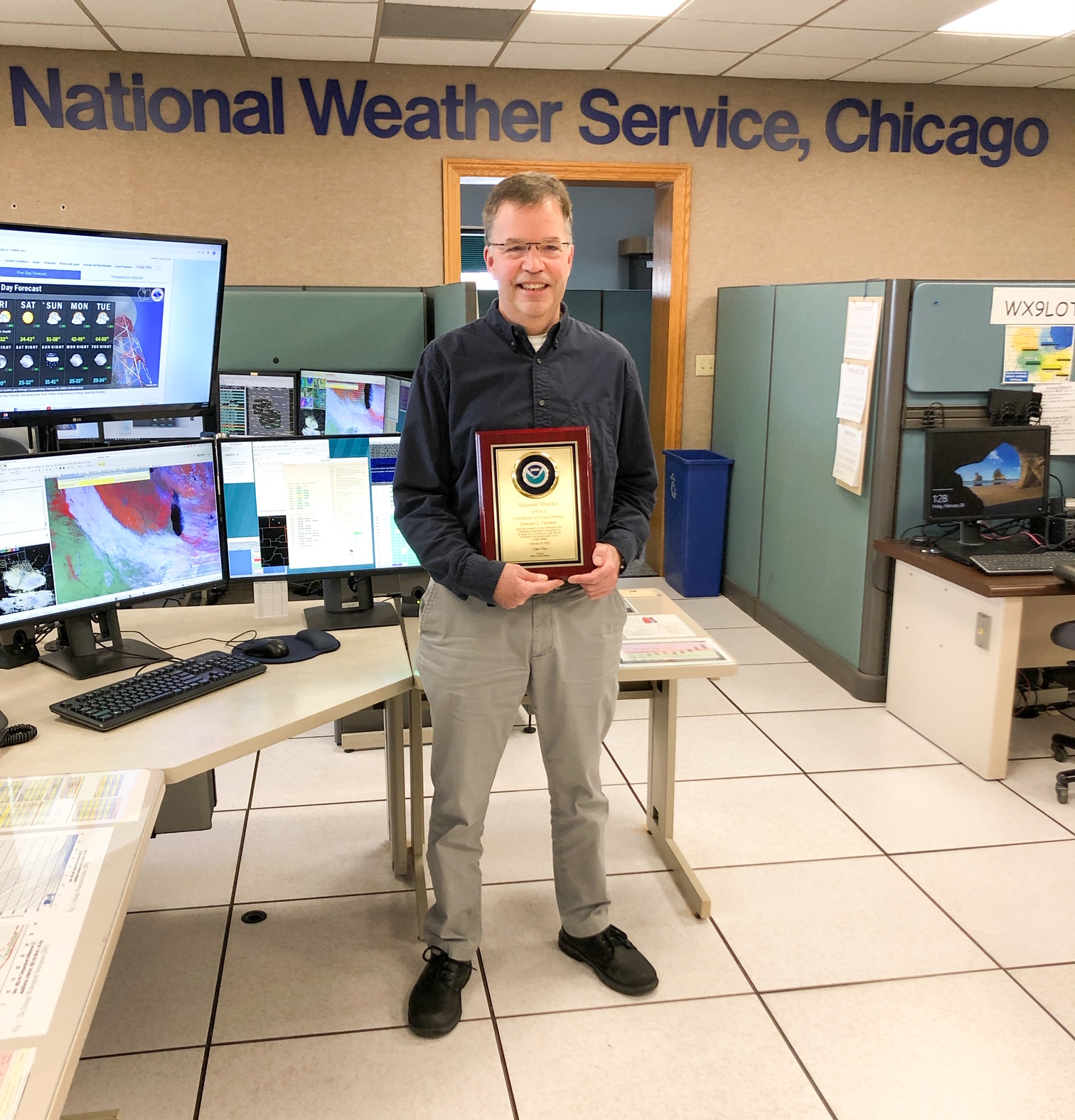
Meteorologist-in-Charge Ed Fenelon in the office of the Chicago Field Office of the National Weather Service, 2019

Chicago and surrounding areas are under the coverage of National Weather Service Chicago, Illinois, a National Weather Service office located in Romeoville on the grounds of Lewis University Airport. The National Weather Service also operates a Center Weather Service Unit in Aurora for the purposes of aviation. The forecast office, when fully staffed, has 13 or 14 employees, but only have 2 or 3 at any given time, who monitor Chicago-area weather all hours of the day. The number of active forecasters can be increased before a significant event. The National Weather Service works alongside local emergency management to relay warnings and other relevant information, and data from the service is used by broadcast meteorologists on local television across the region.

WGN forecaster Mark Ratzer determined in 2018 that areas under the jurisdiction of the Chicago National Weather Service office are on average put under tornado watches on 6 days every year, with a further 15 days having a severe thunderstorm watch.

Cook County's hazard mitigation plan discusses the hazard of tornadoes, discussing their potential to have significant impacts in the "Safety and Security" and "Health and Medical" fields. Cook County had 15,345 manufactured homes (as of 2024), which are the structures most vulnerable to the impacts of a tornado. The total exposure of all structures vulnerable to a tornado was over $893 billion dollars (2022 USD). The Federal Emergency Management Agency assigned Cook County a "Very High" social vulnerability score for tornadoes, and assigned a risk index of 100 for all tornadic events.

=== Sirens ===
External videos
- Tornado Sirens in Downtown Chicago, (23 June 2010)

As of 2025, Chicago has a total of 112 warning sirens across the city; these are split into 12 siren zones. Sirens may be activated individually, by zone, or city-wide. Sirens are tested for 30 seconds on the first Tuesday of every month at 10:00 a.m. local time. Sirens are sounded during tests and tornado warnings, alongside earthquakes, biological hazard incidents, extreme wind events, and general severe weather.

In 2022, F Newsmagazine wrote that the sound of tornado sirens in Chicago is distinct compared to many others, containing both rising and falling tones alongside a third tone drop. It has been compared to a malfunctioning ambulance siren, with the host of News Center Maine stating that "[i]f there is anything creepier than a tornado it’s this." The sound is produced by the Federal Signal Modulator model of siren's "alternate wail" mode. It was chosen to distinguish the sound of warning sirens from those of emergency vehicles.

== Tornadoes in the city ==
Confirmed tornadoes by Fujita rating
FU	F0	F1	F2	F3	F4	F5	Total
0	8	4	4	1	2	0	21 (Note: Includes officially unrated tornadoes, and those at O'Hare International Airport and Midway International Airport.)

=== 1781 Portage tornado ===
A potential tornado occurred in the Chicago Portage region in the modern-day southwest of Chicago in 1781, where a traveller reported significant tree damage near Mud Lake. This may have been the first reported tornado in the Chicago region, however, this event is officially not acknowledged by the National Weather Service.

=== 1876 tornado ===
A tornado struck downtown Chicago on May 6, 1876, killing 2 and injuring 35 across its 4 mi (6.4 km) path. Structures damaged or destroyed include the Reaper Mansion, a candy factory, a county hospital, and a freight depot. A reporter with the Chicago Tribune published a description of the tornado's multiple vortex structure, well ahead of accepted scientific theories on the subject:

[I]t was then composed of eight or ten columns grouped together, all whirling around a central point. The columns, or spirals, twisted and writhed like snakes. The group was about 500 feet in diameter, the various parts leaning at the top towards the centre, and bulging slightly at the middle. Now and then a column would draw away from its fellow and then sweep back. The down rush of air in the vacuum drew the cloud down. Directly under the mass the lake was flat and still. Around it the waters were lashed and torn. The waves dashed upon the spirals as if driven to madness by the attack. As the pillars curled around, binding themselves together, the cloud vomited lightning, as though sick of the performance. Another such scene may never come in this generation, and it is to be regretted that the cylinder could not have been caught and pickled for scientific investigation.

While workers at the freight depot and the county hospital were trapped, they survived the tornado. WGN meteorologist Tom Skilling brought up the 1876 tornado as a response to a query about a tornado striking high-rises in downtown Chicago, despite its occurrence well before the construction of Chicago's high-rise buildings.

However, references towards the May 6, 1876, event as a tornado are not consistent in primary sources and accounts. The National Weather Service office in Chicago refers to the event as a "storm". There were a proportionally small reports of tornadoes as opposed to general storms. In addition, reanalysis of surface data revealed that the environment in Chicago was not favorable to intense tornadoes, as surface observations in the region didn't contain the same change in wind direction and dew point expected during tornado events. There is no definitive explanation for the mode of storm in Chicago, however the National Weather Service office suggests that the storm could be explained by gravity wave associated convection, which would be more reasonable given analysis of environmental conditions at that time.

=== 1967 Oak Lawn tornado ===
The Oak Lawn tornado occurred on April 21, 1967 and was described as the "worst storm of the day" during the 1967 Oak Lawn tornado outbreak. The tornado struck Oak Lawn where numerous homes were leveled. At the intersection of 95th Street and Southwest Highway, traffic led to numerous stopped cars being lofted into the air and dispersing in all directions. The tornado leveled a roller skating rink and mobile home park before striking Hometown and Evergreen Park. The tornado moved through Chicago's South Side, where the tornado widened and moved onto Lake Michigan near a water filtration park at 78th Street, where a wind gust of 100 mph (160 km/h) was recorded.

Following the tornado, President Lyndon B. Johnson deployed 800 National Guard troops to Oak Lawn to aid in search-and-rescue operations. A later analysis of interviews following the tornado found that, while a majority of people in houses were sheltering in basements or in the process of doing so, many of those affected by the tornado had been away from home, in places where they would be unable to receive any warning of the tornado. Ahead of the storm, following the issuance of a tornado warning for McHenry county for the F4 Belvidere tornado, the Weather Bureau's warnings were extended for DuPage, Kane, and Cook counties, 24 minutes before the Oak Lawn tornado touched down, in what was described as "an outstanding example of the Weather Bureau’s Tornado Warning System".

=== July 2024 tornado event ===
A series of storms, including a potent derecho, impacted the Chicago region on July 14 and 15, 2024, producing two notable tornado events concentrated in the region, with as many as 5 tornadoes ongoing concurrently. Notably, 6 tornadoes directly impacted the city of Chicago; in addition to the numerous others from the Chicago National Weather Service office, the totals stood at 32 from the July 15 event; 35 on the calendar date of July 15, including those from overnight on July 14; 38 in the 24-hour period from 10:20 p.m. from July 14 through July 15; all records for the Chicago National Weather Service office's area of responsibility (with modern record-keeping beginning in 1950). Similar records were broken for the entire state of Illinois during the event. The anomalously high tornado figure was noted as far exceeding the longstanding record of 32 in a single calendar year, a figure broken the previous year, 2023, in which 58 tornadoes were recorded to strike the region. In addition, the average amount of tornadoes to strike the region in the month of July was only 1, using 10 to 20-year climate records. Storms of a similar magnitude to the July 15 derecho were described as being such that the Chicago region would experience them every 5–10 years or so.

The record-breaking amount of tornadoes during the event was attributed to three primary factors: increased understanding of tornado-producing weather systems; better detection of tornadoes via radar; and better surveying and volunteer reporting methods. The Chicago National Weather Service office conducted storm surveys for weeks after the event and determined the figure of 32 from the July 15 event primarily consisted of EF0 and EF1 tornadoes, with only one EF2 tornado occurring during the entire event.

== Tornadoes in the suburbs ==
Doorbell camera footage of an EF3 tornado striking a home in Naperville

=== 1855 (Jefferson/Des Plaines) ===
The earliest recorded tornado in Illinois struck near the town of Jefferson on May 22, 1855. The tornado struck in the afternoon between 3 and 5 p.m. local time, and lifted a granite house off of its foundation, killing three. The exact location of this tornado has been the subject of confusion, with earlier records confusing the community of Jefferson with a town in Jefferson Township, which would later be annexed as the Jefferson Park neighborhood of Chicago. The location reported as "Jefferson" was later discovered to be in present-day Des Plaines, on property owned by the Jefferson family, with confusion attributed to initial reporters on the Illinois and Wisconsin Railroad which stopped in the aforementioned township. Joseph Henry of the Smithsonian Institution corresponded with the Daily Democratic Press in Chicago for more information about the tornado and its effects that June, and the Smithsonian's organized efforts to record weather information across the United States would lead to the creation of the United States Weather Bureau, now known as the National Weather Service.

=== 1967 (Elgin and Lake Zurich) ===
Elgin and Lake Zurich were struck by an F4 tornado on April 21, 1967, which tracked 17 mi (27 km) across parts of Kane, Cook, and Lake counties. (Note: Grazulis lists this path length as a tornado family instead of a single tornado.) The tornado removed the roof at a factory and caused $100,000 in damage (1991 USD, $236,000 adjusted) to a hospital in Elgin, before growing in size and intensity and destroying 500 homes across Lake Zurich. Through Barrington Hills, homes were leveled, and cars were "thrown like toys" at the intersection of Route 22 and Route 59. In all, 123 were injured, with the total damage cost coming to $10,000,000 (1991 USD, $23,638,000 adjusted).^{:483}

=== 1972 (North Chicago to Waukegan) ===
An F4 tornado moved from North Chicago to Waukegan on September 28, 1972. This was recorded by the National Weather Service as having a 5 mi (8.0 km) long path, causing 20 injuries and $1 million of damage. Grazulis records this as an F2 tornado family, only causing 3 injuries, with $30 million (1991 USD, $70,914,000 adjusted) of damage.^{:527}

=== 1976 (Lemont and Darien) ===
On June 13, 1976, an F4 tornado following an unusual path struck Lemont, Darien, and an area corresponding to modern-day Downers Grove. In Lemont's Hillcrest subdivision, homes were severely damaged, vehicles were lofted, and numerous trees were uprooted, with the area being described as being "left looking like a war-torn battlefield". The tornado would go on to destroy electrical infrastructure as it struck and tore the roof off of Argonne National Laboratory's Biology wing, which, at the time, housed a nuclear reactor. Overall, 2 were killed and 23 were injured by the tornado.

=== 1990 (Plainfield and Joliet) ===
The strongest tornado in the Chicago metropolitan area struck the suburbs of Plainfield and Joliet on August 28, 1990. This was the only tornado rated F5 or equivalent, the highest rating on the Fujita scale, in the region. The tornado was particularly deadly as it lacked a tornado warning - as a result, it killed 29 and injured 350 over its half-hour lifespan. The tornado damaged 1000 homes and destroyed a further 470 and produced a total of $160 million (1990 USD, $394,294,000 adjusted) in damage. Ted Fujita observed that Joliet has an unusually high concentration of strong tornadoes, but was unable to state why the area experienced such a figure.

=== 2021 (Naperville and Woodridge) ===
A large EF3 tornado moved through the western suburbs of Naperville, Woodridge, and Darien, at 11:02 p.m. on June 20, 2021. This tornado primarily affected areas of southern DuPage county, entering Burr Ridge and Willow Springs in Cook County near the end of its life. The tornado downed thousands of trees and injured 10 across its 17.6 mi (28.3 km) path, but despite moving through densely populated areas well after dark, relatively few injuries occurred; this was attributed by the National Weather Service to be partially due to tornado preparedness and the improved usage of tornado warnings before storm events. Over a year later, residents of Naperville were still dealing with the effects of debris in the topsoil, which was the subject of the non-profit organization Naperville Tornado Relief's primary efforts.

== List of tornadoes ==
This list contains all tornadoes of any intensity to strike within the city limits of Chicago, and any tornado rated F2 or above in the Chicago metropolitan area. This list only includes the collar counties and Lake County, Indiana. Other counties that may be considered part of the Chicago metropolitan area are not included.

List of notable tornadoes in Chicago
EF#	Event	County	Date	Path length	Max width	Chicago neighborhoods impacted
— (Note: Officially unrated.)	—N/a	Cook	May 22, 1855	—N/a	—N/a	
—	Struck modern-day Des Plaines; the first tornado on record in Illinois. 4 were killed and 8 were injured.					
— (Note: Officially unrated.)	—N/a	Kane, Cook, Lake	June 3, 1860	15 mi (24 km)	—N/a	
—	Damage stretched from west of Elgin to Dundee to Lake Zurich, and 4 were injured.					
F4	—N/a	Cook	May 23, 1878	—N/a	—N/a	
F4	Killed 2 and injured 8 on its path, which started northeast of Elgin to near Barrington.					
F2	—N/a	McHenry	May 18, 1883	—N/a	—N/a	
F2	3 were killed in McHenry and neighboring Boone County by this tornado that also crossed into Wisconsin.					
F2	—N/a	Will	May 18, 1883	—N/a	—N/a	
F2	Injured 2 near Peotone.					
F2	—N/a	McHenry	June 3, 1883	—N/a	—N/a	
F2	Injured 1 southeast of Harvard.					
F2	—N/a	Will	September 18, 1886	—N/a	—N/a	
F2	Travelled up the Des Plaines river, striking Joliet, causing 20 injuries.					
F2	—N/a	Will	June 10, 1890	—N/a	—N/a	
F2	An F2 tornado destroyed two barns and killed livestock south of Channahon.^{:46}					
F2	—N/a	Cook	May 25, 1896	—N/a	—N/a	Edison Park, Norwood Park
F2	This tornado formed at the Des Plaines River at the boundary between Leyden and Maine townships, traveling east. The tornado tracked through Jefferson Township, Niles, and Park Ridge, before moving into Chicago at Edison Park. The worst damage occurred at Canfield-on-the-Hill in Edison Park. The tornado also moved through Norwood Park. In all, the tornado caused an estimated $100,000 (1896 USD, $3,870,000 adjusted) of damage throughout its track, which was mostly along the northern boundary of Chicago.^{:70}					
F2	Great Blue Norther of November 11, 1911	DuPage	November 11, 1911	4 mi (6.4 km)	—N/a	
F2	Moved through wooded areas 3 miles north of Aurora, terminating near Naperville, damaging two homes.^{:124}					
F3	Great Blue Norther of November 11, 1911	Lake (Indiana)	November 11, 1911	30 mi (48 km)	150 yd (140 m)	
F3	Spawned near Leroy, passing west of Valparaiso.^{:124}					
— (Note: Officially unrated.)	—N/a	Cook	April 6, 1912	—N/a	—N/a	
—	Caused 18 injuries in Wilmette and Niles Center, now Skokie.					
F4	—N/a	Will, Lake (Indiana)	April 21, 1917	33 mi (53 km)	—N/a	
F4	A tornado travelled from Manhattan to north of Crown Point, killing 3 and injuring 60.					
F4	—N/a	Lake (Indiana)	April 21, 1917	20 mi (32 km)	—N/a	
F4	Killed 4 and injured 60, starting from south of Crown Point, near where the previous F4 tornado dissipated.					
F4	1920 Palm Sunday tornado outbreak	Will, DuPage, Cook	March 28, 1920	53 mi (85 km) (Note: This is the path length of the entire tornado family, and likely not the result of a single tornado.)	100 yd (91 m)	Dunning
F4	A family of tornadoes peaking at F4 intensity moved through Channahon, Troy, and Lockport townships, before reaching peak intensity past the DuPage county border and striking Bellwood, Maywood, Melrose Park, Dunning, and Wilmette. 20 were killed and a further 300 injured throughout the tornado family's path.^{:161}					
F3	1920 Palm Sunday tornado outbreak	Lake (Indiana)	March 28, 1920	7 mi (11 km)	100 yd (91 m)	
F3	After spawning near Leroy, this tornado moved northeast, damaging seven homes.^{:162}					
F2	—N/a	DuPage	September 11, 1925	7 mi (11 km)	300 yd (270 m)	
F2	Moved northeast towards Wheaton. 25 homes were damaged, as was agricultural infrastructure. One injury was recorded.^{:194}					
F2	—N/a	Cook	May 18, 1926	3 mi (4.8 km)	100 yd (91 m)	
F2	An F2 tornado moved through Harvey, causing damage to residential areas and factories, skipping over Harvey's downtown, killing livestock, and injuring 6.^{:196}					
EF3/F4	1928 Rockford tornado	McHenry	September 14, 1928	26 mi (42 km)	~166 yd (152 m)	
EF3/F4	A strong tornado moved through the Rockford area in Winnebago County before crossing into Boone County and later McHenry County. 14 people were killed and at least 100 others were injured.^{:215} In 2023, the National Weather Service rated the tornado as an EF3, while Fujita rated the tornado as an F4 in 1990.					
F2	—N/a	Cook	May 5, 1930	—N/a	30 yd (27 m)	
F2	Moved four blocks through Maywood.^{:227}					
F2	—N/a	Kane	April 30, 1933	2.5 mi (4.0 km)	100 yd (91 m)	
F2	Damaged barns and unroofed the high school in Plato Center, causing 3 injuries.^{:243}					
F?	—N/a	Cook	May 1, 1933	—N/a	—N/a	Not specified
F?	Fujita records a tornado struck the city on May 1, 1933, causing an estimated $1,300,000 (1961 USD; $14,006,000 adjusted) of damage.					
F3	—N/a	Will	April 7, 1948	—N/a	—N/a	
F3	Crossing from Grundy county, this tornado struck Braidwood, causing 1 injury across its entire path.					
F4	—N/a	Lake (Indiana)	April 7, 1948	40 mi (64 km)	—N/a	
F4	Over 40 miles from west of Manteno to south of Hebron, this tornado killed 4 and injured 20 across Kankakee (Illinois), Lake, Porter, and Jasper (Indiana) Counties.					
F2	—N/a	Cook, Lake (Indiana)	April 7, 1948	30 mi (48 km)	—N/a	
F2	This F2 tornado started in Calumet City and ended south of Michigan City, injuring 11.					
F2	—N/a	Lake, Indiana	November 13, 1951	.3 mi (480 m)	400 yd (370 m)	
F2	Moved through the Gary subdivision of Glen Park, causing damage primarily to roof structures.^{page number needed}					
F2	—N/a	Kane	May 27, 1954	—N/a	—N/a	
F2	A tornado moved through Kane County at the city limits of Aurora.^{:374}					
F2	—N/a	Lake, Indiana	June 1, 1954	—N/a	33 yd (30 m)	
F2	F2, 0 miles, 33 yards, 0 casualties, 25k damage. (Note: This tornado is not recorded as a significant (F2+) tornado by Grazulis.)					
F?	—N/a	Cook	April 18, 1955	—N/a	—N/a	"extreme northern part" of Chicago
F?	Fujita records that a tornado struck areas of extreme northern Chicago and Evanston.					
F1	1955 Great Plains tornado outbreak	Cook	May 26, 1955	1.5 mi (2.4 km)	100 yd (91 m)	
F1	This tornado never properly entered the city but touched its southwestern border, approaching from Blue Island.					
F2	—N/a	Cook	August 23, 1956	—N/a	—N/a	
F2	An F2 tornado injured 3 in Tinley Park. It was the strongest of 3 tornadoes in the area that day.^{:392}					
F2	—N/a	Kane	August 23, 1956	—N/a	40 yd (37 m)	
F2	F2, 0 miles, 40 yards, 0 casualties, 25k damage. (Note: This tornado is not recorded as a significant (F2+) tornado by Grazulis.)					
F2	—N/a	Lake, Indiana	July 12, 1957	—N/a	27 yd (25 m)	
F2	F2, 0 miles, 27 yards, 0 casualties, 250k damage. (Note: This tornado is not recorded as a significant (F2+) tornado by Grazulis.)					
F2	—N/a	Kane	August 6, 1958	2 mi (3.2 km)	70 yd (64 m)	
F2	F2, 2 miles, 70 yards, 0 casualties, 250k damage. (Note: This tornado is not recorded as a significant (F2+) tornado by Grazulis.)					
F2	—N/a	Will	August 15, 1958	70 mi (110 km) (Note: This is the path length for the entire tornado family. It is not the path length of any individual tornado.)	—N/a	
F2	A long-tracked tornado family began near Dixon and struck Joliet.					
F1	—N/a	Cook	August 30, 1958	1 mi (1.6 km)	70 yd (64 m)	"Southernmost part"
F1	Fujita records that tornado struck the southernmost part of Chicago.					
F2	—N/a	McHenry, Lake	October 9, 1958	48 mi (77 km)	—N/a	
F2	This tornado began west of Harvard and ended near Waukegan, killing 1. (Note: This tornado is not recorded as a significant (F2+) tornado by Grazulis.)					
F2	—N/a	Lake	October 9, 1958	16.7 mi (26.9 km)	33 yd (30 m)	
F2	2.5 million damage, 0 casualties. (Note: This tornado is not recorded as a significant (F2+) tornado by Grazulis.)					
F2	—N/a	McHenry	October 9, 1958	26.2 mi (42.2 km)	33 yd (30 m)	
F2	F2, 26.2 miles, 33 yards, 1 death, 2.5 million damage. (Note: This tornado is not recorded as a significant (F2+) tornado by Grazulis.)					
F2	—N/a	DuPage	September 26, 1959	9.3 mi (15.0 km)	33 yd (30 m)	
F2	DU PAGE - F2, 9.3 miles, 33 yards, 0 casualties, 250k damage. (Note: This tornado is not recorded as a significant (F2+) tornado by Grazulis.)					
F2	—N/a	McHenry	September 26, 1959	—N/a	—N/a	
F2	An F2 tornado injured 1 near the city of McHenry. (Note: This tornado is not recorded as a significant (F2+) tornado by Grazulis.)					
F2	—N/a	McHenry	October 8, 1959	2 mi (3.2 km)	90 yd (82 m)	
F2	Moved along the edge of Fox Lake in the city of McHenry.^{:417}					
F2	—N/a	Cook	March 4, 1961	7.9 mi (12.7 km)	100 yd (91 m)	South Side, Chatham
F2	A tornado began just outside of city limits before moving 6.5 mi (10.5 km) through Chicago's South Side, killing 1 and injuring 114 more. It was the most destructive of the 10 recorded in the city since 1871, causing an estimated $7 million (1961 USD, $75,418,000 adjusted) throughout the city. Significant damage to houses and trees occurred, as did a significant wind event in Homewood. Fujita, who surveyed this tornado from a helicopter, noticed how some homes had trees uprooted and their garages destroyed, while nearby property merely had shingle and window damage.					
F3	Tornado outbreak sequence of April 23–30, 1961	Lake, Indiana	April 23, 1961	15.4 mi (24.8 km)	33 yd (30 m)	
F3	An F3 tornado struck Lowell, Shelby, and Roselawn in Lake and Newton Counties.^{:428}					
F3	Tornado outbreak sequence of April 23–30, 1961	Will	April 23, 1961	36.3 mi (58.4 km)	33 yd (30 m)	
F3	Damaged and destroyed homes from Lorenzo to Symerton to Beecher, injuring 4.^{:428}					
F2	—N/a	Cook	June 23, 1962	.5 mi (0.80 km)	150 yd (140 m)	
F2	A tornado damaged 14 homes in the El Vista subdivision of Oak Forest.^{:437}					
F2	—N/a	Lake, Indiana	July 20, 1962	14.9 mi (24.0 km)	33 yd (30 m)	
F2	A tornado struck Griffith, Ross, and Crocker, unroofing a church at Griffith.^{:437}					
F2	—N/a	McHenry	April 19, 1963	—N/a	33 yd (0.030 km)	
F2	F2, 0 miles, 33 yards, 0 casualties, 250k damage.					
F4	1965 Palm Sunday tornado outbreak	McHenry, Lake	April 11, 1965	11 mi (18 km)	400 yd (370 m)	
F4	Crystal Lake to Island Lake to N of Wauconda. Major damage occurred throughout Crystal Lake and Island Lake from this violent tornado that killed 6 and injured a further 75.^{:456}					
F2	1965 Palm Sunday tornado outbreak	Lake	April 11, 1965	4.5 mi (7.2 km)–6 mi (9.7 km)	175 yd (160 m)–200 yd (180 m)	
F2	A waterspout over Druce Lake came ashore and caused damage to a dozen homes in Gurnee.^{:457}					
F2	—N/a	DuPage	May 26, 1965	13.8 mi (22.2 km)	70 yd (64 m)	O'Hare
F2	This skipping tornado moved from northwest of Wheaton to O'Hare, damaging 30 cars at the latter, causing 11 injuries.^{:469}					
F2	—N/a	Will	November 12, 1965	24.5 mi (39.4 km)	120 yd (110 m)	
F2	F2, 24.5 miles, 120 yards, 2 deaths, 90 injuries, 25m damage. Morris to NE of Channahon to Preston Heights to Tinley Park.					
F3	—N/a	Lake, Indiana	November 12, 1965	4.1 mi (6.6 km)	40 yd (37 m)	
F3	F3, 4.1 miles, 40 yards, 14 injuries, 250k damage. Two elementary schools were damaged.					
F2	—N/a	DuPage	November 12, 1965	1 mi (1.6 km)	20 yd (18 m)	
F2	F2, 1 mile, 20 yards, 0 casualties, 25k damage.					
F2	—N/a	DuPage	April 19, 1966	.5 mi (0.80 km)	40 yd (37 m)	
F2	Caused damage to around 40 homes. Grazulis records the path as starting north of Lisle, while Storm Data records the path as from Lisle to Valley View.^{:474}					
F2	—N/a	Lake, Indiana	July 13, 1966	—N/a	33 yd (30 m)	
F2	F2, 0 miles, 33 yards, 0 casualties, 25k damage.					
F4	1967 Oak Lawn tornado outbreak	Lake	April 21, 1967	4.5 mi (7.2 km)	150 yd (140 m)	
F4	F4, 4.5 miles, 150 yards, 1 fatality, 97 injuries, 2.5 million damage. 1967 Oak Lawn Lake Zurich tornado.					
F2	1967 Oak Lawn tornado outbreak	Kane	April 21, 1967	.3 mi (480 m)	33 yd (30 m)	
F2	F2, .3 miles, 33 yards, 0 casualties, 250k damage. Damage at Elgin State Hospital. Considered a separate tornado from the Lake Zurich F4.					
F4	1967 Belvidere tornado	McHenry	April 21, 1967	14 mi (23 km)	1,200 yd (1,100 m)	
F4	F4, 14 miles, 1200 yards, 40 injuries, 25 million damage.					
F4	Oak Lawn tornado	Cook	April 21, 1967	16 mi (26 km)	200 yd (180 m)	South Side
F4	Struck Palos Hills, Oak Lawn, Hometown, Evergreen Park, and finally Chicago's South Side, killing 33 and injuring 500, notably at an intersection during rush hour traffic.^{:483}					
F2	—N/a	Cook	April 30, 1970	4.9 mi (7.9 km)	33 yd (30 m)	"northwest Chicago"
F2	A tornado was reported in northwestern Chicago, damaging trees, windows, and power lines. (Note: This tornado is not recorded as a significant (F2+) tornado by Grazulis.)					
F2	—N/a	DuPage	August 24, 1971	1 mi (1.6 km)	83 yd (76 m)	
F2	A tornado moved east through southern Naperville, causing damage to 16 homes and injuring 2.^{:521}					
F2	—N/a	Will	April 6, 1972	6.8 mi (10.9 km)	50 yd (46 m)	
F2	F2, 6.8 miles, 50 yards, 1 death, 22 injuries, 250k damage.					
F2	—N/a	Will	April 6, 1972	5.1 mi (8.2 km)	50 yd (46 m)	
F2	F2, 5.1 miles, 50 yards, 0 casualties, 250k damage.					
F2	—N/a	DuPage	July 17, 1972	—N/a	33 yd (30 m)	
F2	F2, 0 miles, 33 yards, 0 casualties, 2.5m damage. Likely non-tornadic downburst event in Glen Ellyn and southern Wheaton, with large hail and flooding.					
F4	1972 North Chicago tornado	Lake	September 28, 1972	5.2 mi (8.4 km)	220 yd (200 m)	
F4	F4, 5.2 miles, 220 yards, 20 injuries, 2.5 million damage.					
F3	—N/a	Lake, Indiana	June 20, 1974	4.5 mi (7.2 km)	150 yd (140 m)	
F3	F3, 4.5 miles, 150 yards, 5 injuries, 250k damage. Homes, commercial structures, and cars were damaged in Lowell.					
F3	—N/a	DuPage	March 12, 1976	14.8 mi (23.8 km)	30 yd (27 m)	
F3	F3, 14.8 miles, 30 yards, 3 injuries, 2.5m damage.					
F2	—N/a	DuPage	March 12, 1976	—N/a	150 yd (140 m)	
F2	F2, 0 miles, 150 yards, 25 injuries, 2.5m damage.					
F2	—N/a	Lake, Indiana	March 12, 1976	2.3 mi (3.7 km)	200 yd (180 m)	
F2	F2, 2.3 miles, 200 yards, 0 casualties, 2.5k damage. Deep River.					
F2	—N/a	Lake	April 20, 1976	.8 mi (1.3 km)	50 yd (46 m)	
F2	F2, .8 miles, 50 yards, 2 injuries, 25k damage.					
F4	—N/a	Cook, DuPage	June 13, 1976	—N/a	1,760 yd (1,610 m)	
F4	The tornado moved in an unusual "J-shaped" path, striking Lemont, Darien, and areas south of Downers Grove. This tornado also ripped the roof off of a building housing a nuclear reactor at Argonne National Laboratory.^{:581}					
F2	—N/a	Lake (IN)	June 30, 1977	6.8 mi (10.9 km)	300 yd (270 m)	
F2	This tornado began in a swamp, moving through downtown Hobart, and dissipating northwest of South Haven.^{:590}					
F1	—N/a	Cook	April 18, 1978	6.1 mi (9.8 km)	177 yd (162 m)	Midway
F1	Knocked over a Cessna 172 at Midway field.					
F2	—N/a	McHenry	August 15, 1978	2 mi (3.2 km)	100 yd (91 m)	
F2	F2, 2 miles, 100 yards, 0 casualties, 250k damage.					
F2	Western Wisconsin Derecho	Kane	July 16, 1980	1.4 mi (2.3 km)	440 yd (400 m)	
F2	F2, 1.4 miles, 440 yards, 0 casualties, 250k damage. Damage to agricultural infrastructure, 48k pounds of grain lost.					
F3	—N/a	Will	April 27, 1984	4 mi (6.4 km)	200 yd (180 m)	
F3	F3, 4 miles, 200 yards, 1 death, 5 injuries, 2.5m damage. Kendall County to Plainfield to Plainsman Terrace.					
F2	—N/a	Will	April 5, 1988	23 mi (37 km)	50 yd (46 m)	
F2	F2, 23 miles, 50 yards, 0 casualties, unspecified damage.					
F5	1990 Plainfield tornado	Will	August 28, 1990	11.2 mi (18.0 km)	600 yd (550 m)	
F5	1990 Plainfield tornado - F5, 11.2 miles, 600 yards, 29 deaths, 350 injuries, 250m damage.					
F3	—N/a	Will	March 27, 1991	3 mi (4.8 km)	200 yd (180 m)	
F3	F3, 3 miles, 200 yards, 0 casualties, 25m damage. Romeoville to Lemont to Willow Springs. "Only a few" injuries.					
F2	—N/a	Will	August 15, 1993	.3 mi (480 m)	20 yd (18 m)	
F2	F2, .3 miles, 20 yards, 0 casualties, 500k damage. Brief tornado in New Lenox.					
F2	Tornado outbreak sequence of April 1996	Lake	April 19, 1996	2 mi (3.2 km)	100 yd (91 m)	
F2	F2, 2 miles, 100 yards, 2 injuries, 6.6 million damage.					
F2	—N/a	Lake	May 18, 1997	6 mi (9.7 km)	75 yd (69 m)	
F2	F2, 6 miles, 75 yards. 0 casualties, unspecified damage cost.					
F0	Tornado outbreak of September 21–23, 2006	Cook	September 22, 2006	.3 mi (0.48 km)	50 yd (46 m)	Loyola University campus
F0	A brief tornado was filmed at Loyola University Chicago, causing tree damage before moving over Lake Michigan.					
EF3	Tornado outbreak sequence of January 7–11, 2008	McHenry	January 7, 2008	6.3 mi (10.1 km)	100 yd (91 m)	
EF3	EF3, 6.3 miles, 100 yards, 1 injury, 2 million damage.					
EF2	Tornado outbreak sequence of June 3–11, 2008	Will	June 7, 2008	14.12 mi (22.72 km)	200 yd (180 m)	
EF2	EF2, 14.12 miles, 200 yards, 0 casualties, 500k damage. Essex.					
EF2	Tornado outbreak sequence of June 3–11, 2008	Will	June 7, 2008	2.16 mi (3.48 km)	400 yd (370 m)	
EF2	EF2, 2.16 miles, 400 yards, 0 casualties, 50k damage. NE of Wilton Center.					
EF2	Tornado outbreak sequence of June 3–11, 2008	Will	June 7, 2008	3.66 mi (5.89 km)	150 yd (140 m)	
EF2	EF2, 3.66 miles, 150 yards, 0 casualties, 500k damage. Monee?					
EF2	Tornado outbreak sequence of June 3–11, 2008	Will	June 7, 2008	2.42 mi (3.89 km)	150 yd (140 m)	
EF2	EF2, 2.42 miles, 150 yards, 6 injuries, 5.5m damage.					
EF2	—N/a	Lake, Indiana	August 4, 2008	2.74 mi (4.41 km)	30 yd (27 m)	
EF2	EF2, 2.74 miles, 30 yards, 0 casualties, 1m damage. Damage to a mall in Griffith.					
EF2	October 2010 North American storm complex	Will	October 26, 2010	2.32 mi (3.73 km)	200 yd (180 m)	
EF2	EF2, 2.32 miles, 200 yards, 2 injuries, 500k damage.					
EF2	Tornado outbreak of November 17, 2013	Will	November 17, 2013	7.6 mi (12.2 km)	200 yd (0.18 km)	
EF2	EF2, 7.6 miles, 200 yards, 0 casualties, 2m damage. Continuation from Grundy County.					
EF2	Tornado outbreak of November 17, 2013	Will	November 17, 2013	5.21 mi (8.38 km)	200 yd (180 m)	
EF2	EF2, 5.21 miles, 200 yards, 0 casualties, 750k damage.					
F2	—N/a	Lake, Indiana	June 30, 2014	3.2 mi (5.1 km)	2.95 yd (2.70 m)	
F2	EF2, 3.2 miles, 295 yards, 0 casualties, 250k damage. Damage to agricultural infrastructure.					
EF2	—N/a	Will	June 22, 2015	8.56 mi (13.78 km)	1,320 yd (1,210 m)	
EF2	EF2, 8.56 miles, 1320 yards, 0 casualties, 250k damage. Continues from Grundy. Damage on the property of Braidwood Nuclear Generating Station.					
EF0	—N/a	Cook	August 9, 2016	0.01 mi (0.016 km)	10 yd (9.1 m)	Midway
EF0	A brief landspout occurred on the runway at Midway International Airport.					
EF0	—N/a	Cook	September 3, 2018	1.71 mi (2.75 km)	75 yd (69 m)	Western Chicago, Garfield Park
EF0	A tornado touched down in western Chicago, causing primarily tree damage starting west of Cicero Avenue, with the damage path crossing I-290 at Pulaski Road before lifting near Garfield Park between 5th Avenue and Jackson Boulevard. A tree fell into an apartment and multiple large tree limbs fell onto cars throughout its path.					
EF3	2021 Naperville–Woodridge tornado	DuPage	June 20, 2021	14.8 mi (23.8 km)	600 yd (550 m)	
EF3	EF3, 14.8 miles, 600 yards, 11 injuries, unspecified damage.					
EF0	—N/a	Cook	July 12, 2023	3.42 mi (5.50 km)	300 yd (270 m)	O'Hare
EF0	Damaged warehouses at O'Hare, and caused damage to the parking lot of Allstate Arena.					
EF0	—N/a	Cook	July 14, 2024	8 mi (13 km)	300 yd (270 m)	West Elsdon, Gage Park, New City, Fuller Park, Kenwood, Chicago
EF0	Caused damage primarily to trees and roofs, causing tree limbs to fall on roads, before the tornado crossed onto Lake Michigan as a waterspout.					
EF0	Severe weather sequence of July 13–16, 2024	Cook	July 14, 2024	3.6 mi (5.8 km)	200 yd (180 m)	Woodlawn, Jackson Park
EF0	A tornado touched down on Harvard Avenue between 69th and 70th streets, crossing I-94 and I-90 and knocking over a railroad car. Throughout Woodlawn and Jackson Park, significant damage occurred to trees and minor damage occurred to roofs, with a large tree falling on two houses along University Avenue, before the tornado moved onto Lake Michigan as a waterspout close to the 63rd Street Beach.					
EF2	Severe weather sequence of July 13–16, 2024	Will	July 15, 2024	24.9 mi (40.1 km)	325 m (0.325 km)	
EF2	EF2, 24.9 miles, 325 yards, 2 injuries, unspecified damage. Channahon to Matteson. Continues into Cook County.					
EF0	—N/a	Cook	July 15, 2024	2.8 mi (4.5 km)	250 yd (230 m)	O'Hare
EF0	Damaged loose objects, windows, siding, and doors at O'Hare's terminals.					
EF1	Severe weather sequence of July 13–16, 2024	Cook	July 15, 2024	3.2 mi (5.1 km)	150 yd (140 m)	Ashburn, Marquette Park
EF1	A tornado touched down in Marquette Park, snapping the bases of multiple willow trees and causing widespread damage to other trees throughout the park. Trees downed near the intersection of 66th and Artesian street caused the blockage of multiple residential streets, and a light pole broke. More tree damage occurred in William Ogden Park, including damage to the limbs of healthy trees, before the tornado lifted near May and 64th streets.					
EF1	Severe weather sequence of July 13–16, 2024	Cook	July 15, 2024	3.1 mi (5.0 km)	400 yd (370 m)	Garfield Park
EF1	A weak tornado formed south of I-290 and Garfield Park, causing damage to trees and roof damage to a house on Flournoy Street. More intense tree damage occurred, including the uprooting of healthy trees, near Rush University Medical Center and Stroger hospital, before the tornado struck I-290 and caused more damage in Skinner Park, with large and healthy trees uprooted and two buildings including the Chicago Police Academy building being damaged. The tornado continued producing tree damage as it crossed I-90/94 and lifted before reaching the Chicago River.					
EF0	Severe weather sequence of July 13–16, 2024	Cook	July 15, 2024	1.4 mi (2.3 km)	150 yd (140 m)	Ukrainian Village
EF0	A tornado touched down near the intersection of Grand Avenue and Sacramento Boulevard, causing damage to trees, utility poles, and windows, with occasional damage to roofs and siding as well. A social media photo showed that a large tree fell on a car on Superior Street between Western and Rockwell. The tornado lifted near the intersection of Huron Street and Damen Avenue.					
EF2	Tornado outbreak of June 11, 2026	Lake, Indiana	June 11, 2026	6.45 mi (10.38 km)	700 yd (640 m)	
EF2	EF2 damage was observed from a tornado that struck Merrillville and Hobart.					

== See also ==
- List of Illinois tornadoes
- Climate of Chicago
  - June 2022 Chicago supercell, a record-breaking thunderstorm that impacted the region
- List of tornadoes in Washington, D.C.
- St. Louis tornado history
