= 1928 Rockford tornado =

1928 tornado in Illinois, U.S.

- Damage to the Rockford Chair and Furniture Factory, where several people were buried under debris and killed

Meteorological history
- Formed: September 14, 1928

EF3+ tornado (Note: Per National Weather Service damage surveyors)
- Highest winds: 150 mph (240 km/h)

F4 tornado (Note: Per Thomas P. Grazulis)
- Highest winds: >207 mph (333 km/h)

Overall effects
- Fatalities: 14
- Injuries: 100+
- Damage: $20 million (2024 USD)
- Areas affected: Winnebago, Boone and McHenry County, Illinois

On September 14, 1928, a deadly and destructive tornado moved through the city of Rockford, located in the U.S. state of Illinois. The tornado killed 14 people and injured at least 100 more along a 26-mile (42 km) path that stretched from downtown Rockford to rural McHenry County. Hundreds of structures in Rockford were destroyed, with damages totaling an estimated $20 million (2024 USD).

The tornado first produced damage on Falnud Street, almost immediately becoming intense as it moved to the northeast, where homes were shifted off their foundations and porches suffered damage. As the tornado moved through the downtown and industrial portions of Rockford it killed numerous people, collapsing several factory buildings. One factory building, the Rockford Chair and Furniture Factory, saw the loss of 8 workers with many more injuries. The tornado continued moving to the northeast as it entered central Boone County, damaging rural properties and farms. It retained EF0 and EF1 intensity before lifting near North Boone School Road.

In 1990, tornado historian Thomas P. Grazulis rated the tornado as an F4 on the Fujita scale; in 2023, National Weather Service damage surveyors rated the tornado as an EF3 on the Enhanced Fujita Scale.

== Tornado summary ==
The tornado first touched down on Falund Street at 3:19 pm, immediately reaching EF2 intensity as it shifted a home off its foundation on Hyde Street (now Energy Avenue). A house nearby collapsed inward with the injuries of four occupants. The tornado weakened on Harrison Avenue before rapidly intensifying on Scoville Street. Two people in the parking lot of an industrial building observed the tornado; they described its appearance as a "huge blue curtain with small black dots". A large warehouse in the area was leveled by winds estimated to have been as high as 150 miles per hour (240 km/h); damage to the structure was determined to have been EF3 on the Enhanced Fujita scale. Off Peoples Avenue the tornado uplifted the roof of a structure at EF1 intensity, and more EF0 and EF1 damage was done to buildings on 22nd Avenue. The tornado reached EF2 intensity again while passing over South 5th Street; a home was shifted off its foundation and other homes suffered porch damage.

More damage was done to buildings as the tornado crossed from the South 5th Street area to 7th Street, where the roof of a home landed on three children running from the tornado; all three were killed. It reached EF3 intensity as it moved into an industrial area in Rockford, where numerous factories suffered heavy damage. The Union Furniture Factory saw heavy roof and wall damage with the loss of numerous workers, and the National Lock Company suffered broken windows. The Union Factory company saw numerous fatalities as a result of the tornado, and several factory workers were reported missing immediately following the tornado. Several people were injured as the tornado crossed 18th Avenue, including one person who was hit by flying debris. It briefly weakened on 17th Avenue before restrengthening to EF2 intensity, where porches were damaged and homes sustained roof damage. A large swath of EF2 damage was cut from that point to 12th Avenue, where the tornado weakened before almost immediately restrengthening. At around this time, several students walking from the Hallstrom School almost walked directly into the tornado as it crossed railroad tracks nearby; one student stopped the group before they unknowingly walked into the tornado. Many homes on 16th Street and 17th Street sustained roof damage as the tornado continued tracking to the northeast before the tornado crossed Charles Street, where the roofs and walls of the Ray Brown Company and David Carlson Roofing Company buildings suffered damage from the tornado. Pieces of buildings and other damage from Rockford was lofted into the air and found as far away as Chemung. At this point in the tornado's path it was beginning to leave heavily populated areas and track through rural areas in the far-eastern portions of Rockford. In this area the P. Byron Thomas farm was damaged; several miles northeast the Frank Thomas farm sustained a similar degree of damage. Monuments at the Guilford Union cemetery were damaged as the tornado continued along its northeastward track; it was unclear whether the damage was from the tornado itself or straight-line winds produced by the storm. At around 3:34 pm the tornado likely remained on the ground, but did not produce discernible damage through much of Boone County. After passing to the north of Poplar Grove at around 3:40, barns and a farm on the Ben Johnson property were damaged at EF1 intensity.

More EF1 damage was inflicted to structures on the Patsey Haley farm off of Centerville Road, and animals were killed at the Hans Wing farm on North Boone School Road. The tornado lifted at 4:05 pm shortly after crossing into McHenry County. It remained on the ground for 26 miles (42 km) from its initial touchdown location to lifting location. It had an estimated forward speed of around 40 miles per hour (64 km/h), and was up to 500 feet (150 m) wide along its path.

== Aftermath ==
=== Damage, casualties and rating ===
Damage done by the tornado officially received a maximum rating of EF3+ on the Enhanced Fujita scale following a 2023 damage survey carried out by the National Weather Service; in 1990, in his book Significant Tornadoes: A chronology of events, tornado historian Thomas P. Grazulis rated the tornado as an F4 on the Fujita scale. An estimated $2 million (1928 USD) in damage was done by the tornado, which equates to an estimated $20 million (2024 USD). Four factories and 360 more homes were destroyed during the event. Due to the damage inflicted to residential structured, hundreds of people were left homeless in the immediate aftermath of the event. As a result of industrial plants being damaged, many families saw a temporary loss in income.

The injured were taken to eight hospitals in the Rockford metropolitan area. By two days after the tornado six people remained missing, and by September 17 that number had dropped to four. By September 21 all 14 known victims of the tornado had been recovered from debris. 8 of the victims were killed at the Rockford Chair and Furniture Company building after being buried in debris when the building collapsed.

The 129th Infantry Regiment was dispatched to aid in recovery efforts following an executive order signed by Illinois governor Len Small.

List of fatalities attributed to the tornado
Name	Age	Ref.
Alex Algren	40	
Martin Anderson	4	
John Bruski	44	
Everett Cornmusser	16	
Bernard Cornmusser	14	
Virgil Cornmusser	17	
George Fagerberg	51	
Olaf Larson	27	
Tony Martinkas	50	
August J. Peterson	52	
Gunnar Ryden	29	
Frank Strom	34	
Swan Swenson	40	
Herman Wydell	47	

=== Flooding from the storm ===
The storm that produced the tornado also caused large amounts of flooding in Rockford along the Keith Creek. Several roadways and a few structures were impacted by the floods. A car was submerged on 6th Avenue by the floodwaters, and on Charles Street more flooding was documented.

== See also ==
- 1967 Belvidere tornado, a violent tornado that affected the nearby city of Belvidere, Illinois
- List of Illinois tornadoes
  - Tornadoes in Chicago
