= 2021 Naperville–Woodridge tornado =

2021 tornado in Illinois, U.S.

- The tornado as it moved through Woodridge, Illinois

Meteorological history
- Formed: June 20, 2021, 11:02 p.m. CDT (UTC−05:00)
- Dissipated: June 20, 2021, 11:25 p.m. CDT (UTC−05:00)
- Duration: 23 minutes

EF3 tornado
- on the Enhanced Fujita scale
- Highest winds: 140 mph (230 km/h)

Overall effects
- Fatalities: 1 indirect (Note: This total includes the loss of child experienced after a woman who was 6 months pregnant was critically injured.)
- Injuries: 11
- Areas affected: Southern DuPage County and Willow Springs, Illinois, US
- Part of the tornadoes of 2021

On the evening of June 20, 2021, an intense quasi-linear convective system tornado affected the Chicago suburbs of Naperville, Woodridge, Darien, Burr Ridge, and Willow Springs in DuPage and Cook Counties in Illinois, United States. The tornado struck well after dark and was rated an EF3, with estimated wind speeds of up to 140 mph (230 km/h). It had a path length of 14.8 mi (23.8 km) and reached a width of 600 yd (550 m), while causing 11 injuries, downing thousands of trees, and inflicting significant structural damage primarily across Naperville and Woodridge. It was the strongest tornado spawned by a severe weather outbreak that was associated with a surface low over Wisconsin. The severe weather outbreak produced 17 tornadoes across parts of the United States and Canada.

In the immediate aftermath, the damage was described as "extensive", with 900 properties damaged, 300 of which were considered significantly damaged, and 29 deemed uninhabitable. The non-profit Naperville Tornado Relief raised over one million dollars to aid in cleanup effort in 2023, and repair efforts continued into 2024. It was the strongest tornado in the Chicago metropolitan area since the 2015 Coal City tornado, and the first major tornado in DuPage County since the 1976 Lemont tornado.

== Meteorological synopsis ==
On June 20, 2021, the Storm Prediction Center had outlined an Enhanced (3/5) risk for severe weather over extreme eastern Iowa, northern Illinois and Indiana, southern Michigan, and extreme northwest Ohio for the potential of severe weather, focused on damaging straight-line winds, with the potential for isolated large hail and non-significant tornadoes. A conditional threat for the development of supercells existed over northern Illinois, with forecasters noting the difficulty of predicting any large-scale threat due to numerous existing outflow boundaries in the risk area.

Two rounds of severe weather were forecasted, with one being an afternoon mesoscale convective vortex system that had moved through Missouri, central Illinois, and northern Indiana. A second round of storms was expected to reach the Chicago metropolitan area later that evening. At 9:40 p.m. CDT, a severe thunderstorm watch was issued across most of northeastern Illinois and extreme northwestern Indiana. The main threat was clusters of storms producing severe downburst winds, with only a low (20%) risk for a tornado, and a very low (5%) chance of a significant tornado.

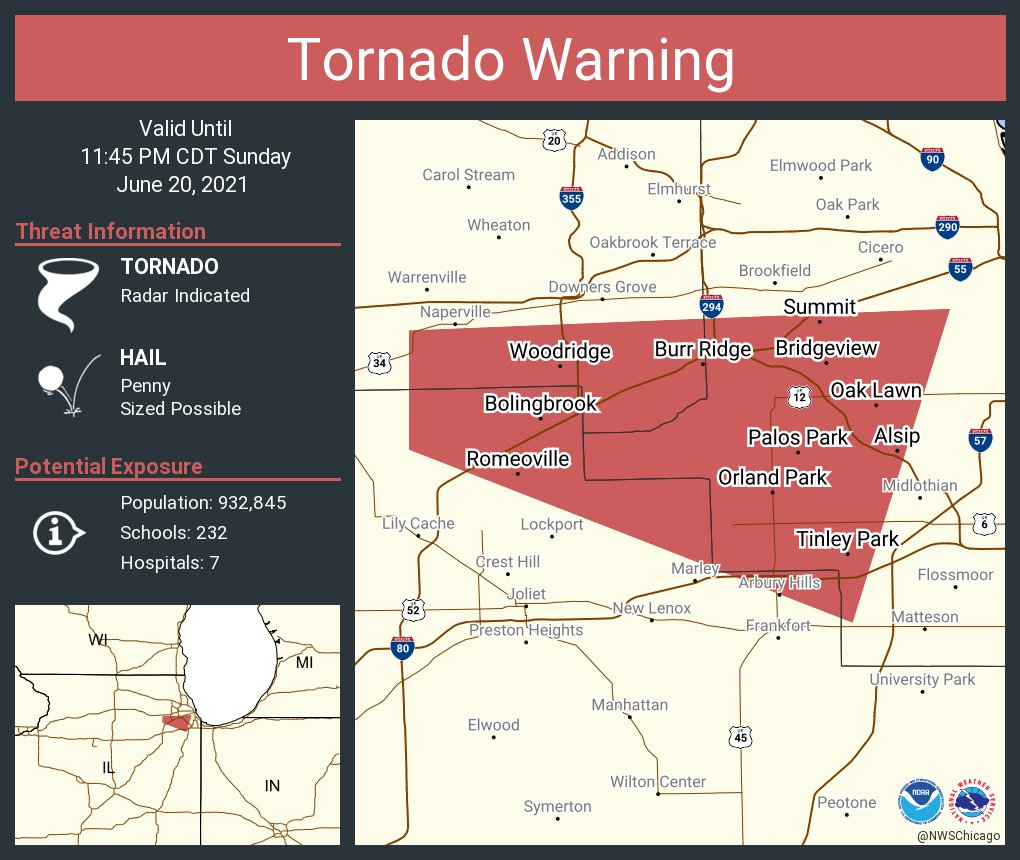
The tornado warning issued for DuPage, Cook, and Will counties

During the afternoon, daytime heating was impeded by cloud cover. Later on in the evening, when the cloud cover decreased, daytime heating resumed, which, along with a strong lower-level jet, rapidly destabilized the atmosphere. A surface low had developed near the border of Iowa and Minnesota, which by 10 p.m. CDT, had moved eastward to Wisconsin while deepening to 997 millibars. An observation from the National Weather Service Chicago, Illinois at Lewis University Airport, taken at around 4z (11 p.m. CDT), revealed MUCAPE values of 1556 J/kg, as well as extreme storm-relative helicity values of 644 m^{2}/s^{2} at 0–1 kilometers and 857 m^{2}/s^{2} at 0–3 kilometers, where storm-relative values of helicity above 150 m^{2}/s^{2} are considered favorable for tornadogenesis.

Later that night, a line of severe thunderstorms began moving into the Chicago metro area. A tornado warning was issued for much of Kane and DuPage counties at 10:43 p.m., including Aurora, Batavia, West Chicago, and western portions of Naperville, as the National Weather Service office in Romeoville tracked two areas of rotation in the area; one over Aurora, and another near Maple Park. One of these rotations ended up producing the Naperville–Woodridge tornado. In addition to the EF3 tornado, two other weak tornadoes were confirmed in the Chicago suburbs of Plainfield and Addison.

== Tornado summary ==
Loop of the tornado moving through Naperville and Woodridge, as seen by KLOT WSR-88D as well as O'Hare and Midway terminal Doppler radar

The tornado, which was spawned by a circulation embedded within the leading edge of a line of severe thunderstorms, first touched down at 11:02 p.m. in the Springbrook Prairie Forest Preserve. The first tornado warning including Naperville and Woodridge was issued at 11:05 p.m. for radar-indicated rotation. This warning included areas of Chicago as well, specifically the Chicago Lawn and Midway International Airport areas. The tornado intermittently damaged trees at EF0 intensity as it moved eastward through the forest preserve. Tree damage became more continuous as the tornado exited the preserve and crossed Modaff Road, where it reached EF1 strength and entered a residential area in the southern part of Naperville. Multiple trees were snapped or uprooted, some of which landed on homes and caused structural damage, though a few homes suffered roof damage from the tornado itself. At 11:06 p.m., the tornado crossed the West Branch of the DuPage River, moving due-east and producing high-end EF1 damage as multiple power poles were snapped along Bailey Road. Trees were also snapped in this area, one of which landed on and damaged a fire station, while nearby apartment buildings suffered broken windows and had small pieces of debris left embedded in their stucco siding. High-end EF1 damage continued as the tornado curved in a more northeasterly direction near Meadow Glens Elementary School, crossing Wehrli Road and impacting neighborhoods along 77th Street. Several houses sustained roof, siding, and window damage in this area, a couple of which also had garage walls blown out. A car was flipped, another car was damaged by flying debris, and large trees were snapped or uprooted, one of which fell onto a house and caused extensive damage. At around 11:09 p.m., the tornado rapidly intensified to its peak strength of low-end EF3 as it entered a subdivision in the southeastern part of Naperville. A poorly anchored house on Princeton Circle was completely leveled and swept from its subfloor, and wind speeds at this location were estimated at 140 mph (230 km/h). This was the most intense damage produced by the tornado. High-end EF1 to EF2 damage occurred just beyond this point as the tornado moved due-east through the subdivision, damaging many homes along Nutmeg Lane and surrounding residential streets. Dozens of homes had partial to total roof loss, and several also sustained collapse of a few exterior walls. Trees were snapped and stripped of their limbs as well. EF2 damage continued as the tornado exited the subdivision and struck an apartment complex along Gladstone Drive, where multi-story apartment buildings were heavily damaged and large detached garages were destroyed. Moving east, the tornado weakened as it moved through the Greene Valley Forest Preserve, downing numerous trees at EF1 intensity.

Maintaining EF1 strength, the tornado crossed IL 53 and entered Woodridge, first causing roof damage at an apartment complex on Deer Street. Some trees were also downed and homes had EF1-level roof damage along Everglade Avenue. Just east of this area, the tornado strengthened to EF2 intensity as it crossed Woodridge Road, where several homes had their roofs and exterior walls ripped off. However, these homes weren't particularly well-constructed. It then inflicted mainly EF1 damage to homes, trees, and fences in residential areas east of this location, though an isolated area of EF2 damage occurred at Janes Avenue, where one house sustained partial roof and exterior wall loss. At 11:13 p.m., the tornado crossed I-355, where a large portion of a traffic sign was ripped from two steel posts and was later found in a pond at the Lake Ridge Club, located 6 miles (9.7 km) away. A final area of EF2 damage occurred just east of I-355, where a couple of well-built apartment buildings near Country Club Drive suffered major roof damage. As the tornado continued eastward through the southeastern sections of Woodridge, it produced high-end EF1 damage as many homes suffered considerable roof, siding, and window damage, and one house on Cedar Drive had one of its second-floor exterior walls blown out. Numerous trees and fences were downed as well. At 11:16 p.m., the National Weather Service upgraded the initial tornado warning to particularly dangerous situation wording, as meteorologists had confirmation that the tornado, now described as "large and extremely dangerous", was moving into Darien. The warning text also stated that "radar confirms debris with this tornado moving over populated areas". Damage intensity ranged from EF0 to high-end EF1 as the tornado moved through Darien, where many trees were snapped or uprooted, and some power poles were snapped as well. A few homes and apartment buildings were also damaged, including a house that had its attached garage destroyed. At 11:17 p.m., a correlation coefficient scan from the KLOT weather radar site at Lewis University Airport indicated debris lofted up to 20,000 ft (3.8 mi; 6.1 km) into the air. By this time, the tornado had weakened to EF0 strength as it crossed I-55 and impacted Burr Ridge in Cook County, Illinois. Damage in Burr Ridge was mostly limited to snapped tree branches, though a couple of trees were downed as well. The tornado then lifted at 11:25 p.m. after causing some additional EF0 tree damage in Willow Springs. The tornado warning that included Cook County expired at 11:45 p.m., 20 minutes after the tornado had lifted.

== Aftermath ==
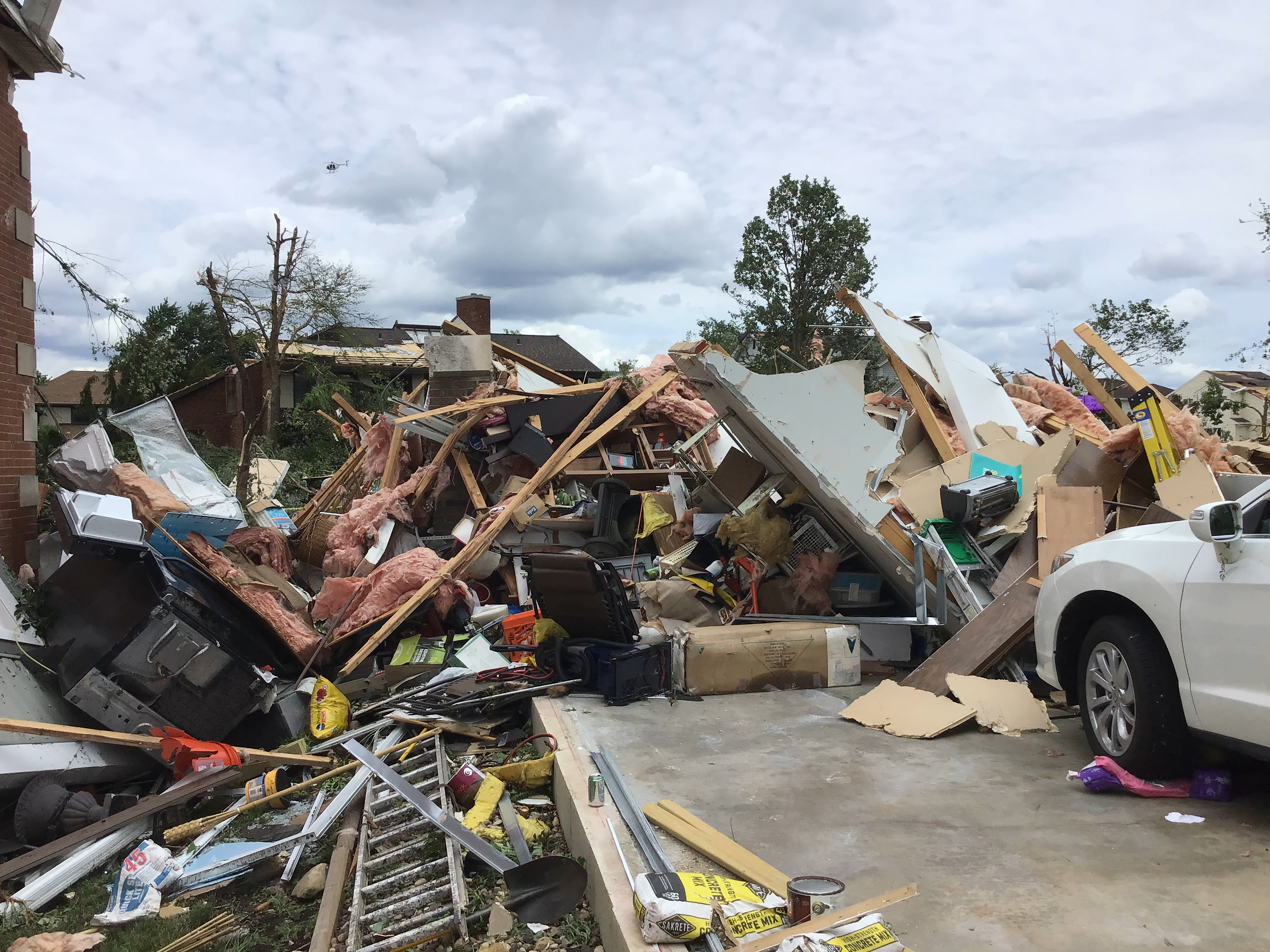
A poorly anchored house that was leveled at low-end EF3 intensity on the southeast side of Naperville

Less than 10 minutes after the tornado lifted, WBBM-TV, Chicago's CBS affiliate, released a news story which described "extensive" damage in Woodridge and Naperville. Daytime surveys conducted from an ABC-7 helicopter showed significant damage in residential areas.

Eleven people were injured by the tornado, including a pregnant woman who lost her unborn baby as a result of critical injuries she sustained. A total of 900 structures received some form of damage, of which 300 had suffered significant damage. 29 properties across Lisle Township were declared uninhabitable. By June 2 the next year, 22 were still in varying stages of repair. On June 22, Alicia Tate-Nadeau, director of the Illinois Emergency Management Agency, toured storm damage in Naperville and Woodridge with DuPage county officials. On June 27, Brian McDaniel of the Illinois River Valley Red Cross met with county officials and opened the Multi-Agency Resource Center, where over 1,000 volunteers assisted to provide aid to those affected by the tornado. The center was opened for two days.

The non-profit group Naperville Tornado Relief was established in the aftermath of the event. They planned to raise $1.5 million to assist in cleanup of properties affected by the tornado. This goal was augmented in January 2023 by Illinois House Bill 969, which awarded the group $1 million. By May 2024, 66 yards across Naperville had been replaced by the group.

As of 2024, some repairs were still ongoing.

== Non–tornadic effects ==
The system also caused damaging straight-line winds, heavy rainfall, and power outages across the Chicago metro area. Over a 24-hour period, total rainfall amounts were reported at 2.75 in (70 mm) in Lake Zurich in Lake County, 2.62 in (67 mm) inches in Elk Grove Village in Cook County, and 2.44 in (62 mm) inches in Bartlett in DuPage County.

== Other tornadoes ==
EFU	EF0	EF1	EF2	EF3	EF4	EF5
0	8	7	1	1	0	0

The Naperville–Woodridge tornado occurred during a two-day severe weather outbreak that affected the United States and Canada from June 20th to June 21st. In addition to the Naperville-Woodridge tornado, the storm system produced two EF0 tornadoes that touched down in the Chicago suburbs of Addison and Plainfield, resulting in minimal damage. An EF1 tornado caused moderate damage in Fremont, Indiana as well. In Canada, a strong tornado impacted Mascouche, Quebec, causing extensive damage, killing one person, and injuring two others. The outbreak produced 17 tornadoes in total.

=== June 20 event ===
List of confirmed tornadoes – Sunday, June 20, 2021 (Note: All dates are based on the local time zone where the tornado touched down; however, all times are in Coordinated Universal Time for consistency.)
EF#	Location	County / Parish	State	Start Coord.	Time (UTC)	Path length	Max width	Summary
EF1	NW of Pella	Marion	IA	41.4284°N 92.9735°W	23:40–23:44	1.47 mi (2.37 km)	150 yd (140 m)	A tornado damaged outbuildings, farmsteads, and trees along its path, lifting just before it would have entered Pella.
EF1	W of Garry Owen to NW of Washington Mills	Jackson, Dubuque	IA	42.28°N 90.85°W	01:06–01:12	3.38 mi (5.44 km)	30 yd (27 m)	Outbuildings at four farmsteads were damaged, and trees were also damaged.
EF1	SE of Blissfield	Lenawee	MI	41.8144°N 83.8363°W	01:23–01:27	2.69 mi (4.33 km)	125 yd (114 m)	Three barns, four outbuildings, and five houses were damaged by the tornado, including one house that had its chimney toppled over. A metal silo was destroyed, and pieces of sheet metal from the structure were scattered up to a quarter-mile away. Trees were uprooted and tree branches were snapped as well.
EF0	Addison	DuPage	IL	41.9291°N 87.9783°W	03:54-03:55	0.4 mi (0.64 km)	75 yd (69 m)	A gazebo was flipped over a fence and trees were damaged.
EF0	Plainfield to Crest Hill	Will	IL	41.6134°N 88.2032°W	04:08–04:14	4.8 mi (7.7 km)	200 yd (180 m)	A high-end EF0 tornado touched down in Plainfield on the northern fringe of an area of damaging straight-line winds. Trees were snapped or uprooted, including several that fell on and damaged houses, and outdoor objects were blown around.

=== June 21 event ===
List of confirmed tornadoes – Monday, June 21, 2021
EF#	Location	County / Parish	State / Province	Start Coord.	Time (UTC)	Path length	Max width	Summary
EF0	NNE of South Haven to WNW of Woodville	Porter	IN	41.5618°N 87.1239°W	05:11–05:16	3.3 mi (5.3 km)	150 yd (140 m)	An area of damaging straight-line winds of 65 to 75 mph (105 to 121 km/h) developed over Liverpool and moved eastward, damaging trees and outbuildings before developing rotation and transitioning into this high-end EF0 tornado near South Haven. Several homes had roof shingles torn off, while numerous trees were damaged or downed along the path.
EF1	N of Wyatt	St. Joseph	IN	41.55°N 86.18°W	06:07–06:09	1.05 mi (1.69 km)	100 yd (91 m)	Trees and outbuildings were damaged.
EF1	Otter Lake to Southern Fremont to N of York	Steuben	IN	41.7307°N 85.003°W	06:52–07:04	10 mi (16 km)	100 yd (91 m)	This tornado developed over the I-69 and I-80/I-90 interchange, damaging trees, outbuildings, and homes before it proceeded east-southeastward into the south side of Fremont. A couple of metal commercial buildings were damaged in town, one of which was unroofed, while a nearby box truck was blown over. Southeast of town, trees and barns were severely damaged, and an outbuilding was destroyed before the tornado dissipated near the Indiana–Michigan border.
EF0	Seven Fields	Allegheny	PA	40.6731°N 80.0643°E	18:53–18:55	1.2 mi (1.9 km)	50 yd (46 m)	A weak tornado caused tree damage, including one area where six trees were uprooted. A rotten tree was uprooted elsewhere along the path. No structures were damaged.
EF1	S of Dryden	Tompkins	NY	42.46°N 76.34°W	21:38–21:49	2.8 mi (4.5 km)	85 yd (78 m)	This low-end EF1 tornado mainly damaged trees along its path south of Dryden. A shed was blown off of its foundation on the west side of Route 38.
EF2	Mascouche	Les Moulins	QC	unknown	unknown	4.06 mi (6.53 km)	273 yd (250 m)	1 death – An EF2 tornado moved through Mascouche, causing extensive damage. A house was severely damaged and pushed completely off of its foundation, another house had its entire roof torn off, and many additional homes, apartment buildings, and a few businesses suffered heavy damage to their roofs, siding, and windows. Large trees were snapped or uprooted, many power poles were snapped, and signs and metal light poles were bent to the ground. Large gravestones were knocked over at a cemetery as well. A man was killed when he tried to take shelter inside a shed, which was lifted into the air and destroyed by the tornado. Two people were injured.
EF0	Saint-Célestin	Nicolet-Yamaska	QC	unknown	unknown	1.08 mi (1.74 km)	33 yd (30 m)	Numerous tree limbs were snapped in Saint-Célestin, and a few trees were downed as well. An agricultural building and a couple of homes had minor roof damage, and a wooden fence was partially blown over.
EF0	Saint-Elzéar	La Nouvelle-Beauce	QC	unknown	unknown	unknown	unknown	This weak tornado caused minor tree damage in Saint-Elzéar.
EF1	NNE of Saint-Narcisse-de-Beaurivage	Lotbinière	QC	unknown	unknown	1.5 mi (2.4 km)	54 yd (49 m)	Several barns and outbuildings were destroyed, a camper was damaged, and large tree branches were snapped.
EF0	Western Saint-Valentin	Le Haut-Richelieu	QC	unknown	unknown	1.9 mi (3.1 km)	54 yd (49 m)	A weak tornado hit the western edge of Saint-Valentin, where a large farm building and a barn had metal roofing panels torn off. A house sustained minor roof shingle damage, and multiple trees and tree limbs were downed.
EF0	E of Saint-Elzéar	La Nouvelle-Beauce	QC	unknown	unknown	unknown	unknown	Minor tree damage occurred in a wooded area.

== See also ==
- 1990 Plainfield tornado, another deadly tornado 31 years prior in northern Illinois
- Tornado outbreak of April 21, 1967 described by some as "Northern Illinois' worst tornado disaster"
- 2015 Rochelle–Fairdale tornado, another deadly tornado that affected nearby areas 6 years prior
