= Climate of Chicago =

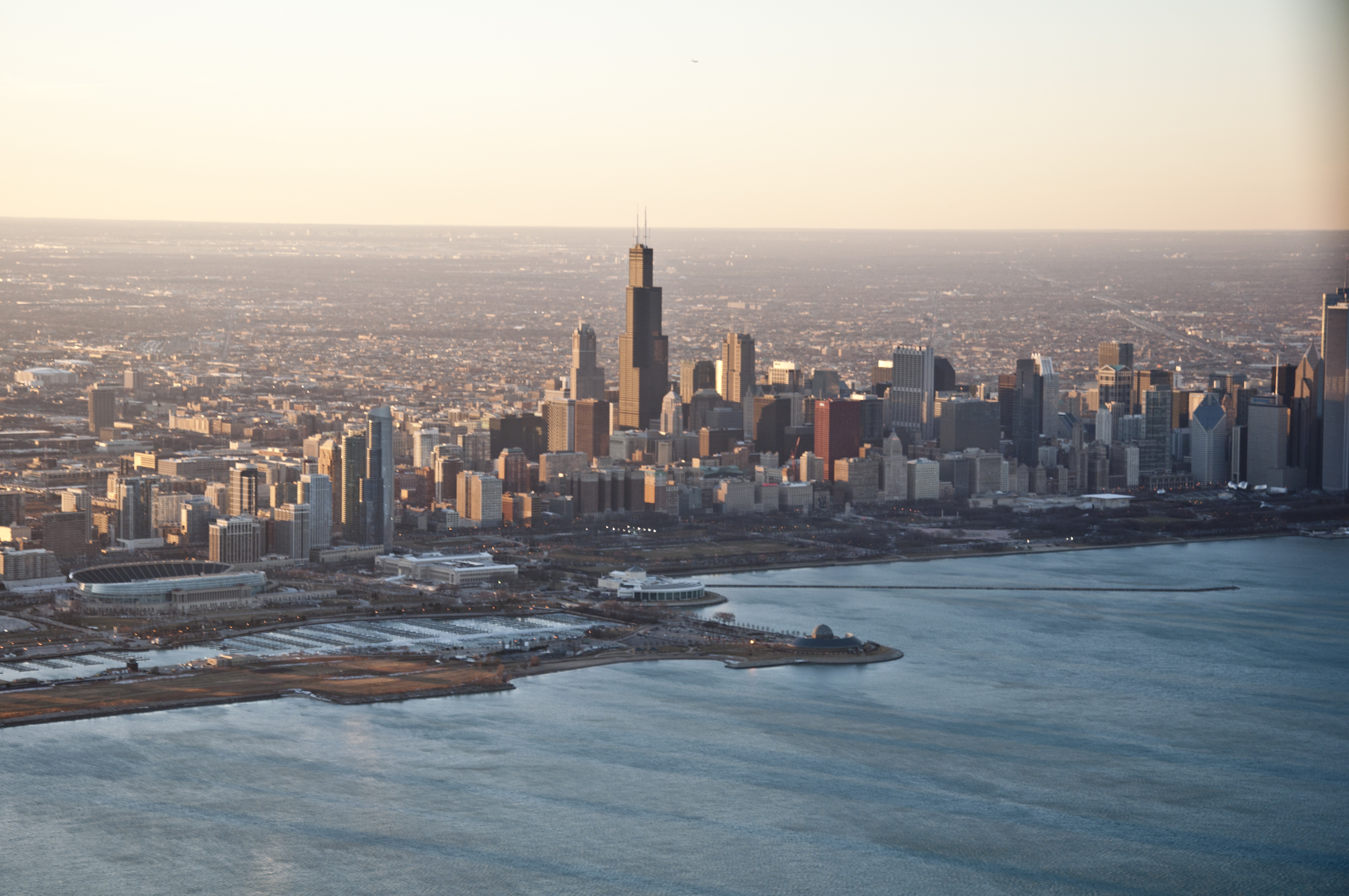
Downtown Chicago in late winter, showing Lake Michigan in the foreground

The climate of Chicago is classified as hot-summer humid continental (Köppen: Dfa, Trewartha: Dca) with hot, humid summers and cold, occasionally snowy winters. Although lakefront areas such as Northerly Island have a Cfa (humid subtropical) climate using Köppen's −3 °C (27 °F) winter isotherm, to even those areas are continental (Dca) under Trewartha due to winters averaging below 0 °C (32 °F), and inland areas such as Midway and O'Hare International Airports are continental even under Köppen. All four seasons are distinctly represented: Winters are cold and often see snow with below 0 Celsius or 32 Fahrenheit temperatures and windchills, while summers are warm and humid with temperatures being hotter inland, spring and fall bring bouts of both cool and warm weather and fairly sunny skies. Annual precipitation in Chicago is moderate and relatively evenly distributed,with the driest months being January and February and the wettest July and August. Chicago's weather is influenced during all four seasons by the nearby presence of Lake Michigan.

== Official locations ==
The National Weather Service office of Chicago has one of the longest periods of official weather records, dating back to 1870, though all the 1870 and 1871 weather records taken at 181 West Washington Street were lost in the Great Chicago Fire. Of the two major airports located in Chicago, Midway Airport began observations in 1928, and O'Hare Airport began them in 1958. Both sites have served in the past as the official observation locations, the latter being the current official station. Weather data from Midway Airport before July 1, 1942, and after January 16, 1980, and data from O'Hare Airport before January 17, 1980, are not part of the official climate record of Chicago.

Here is a list of official weather observation locations for the Chicago office:

Dates	Location	Remarks
October 15, 1870 – October 8, 1871	181 W. Washington St.	All records lost due to Great Chicago Fire
October 15, 1871 – June 11, 1872	427 W. Randolph St.	
June 11, 1872 – June 8, 1873	20 N. Wacker Dr.	
June 8, 1873 – January 1, 1887	Roanoke Building	
January 1, 1887 – February 1, 1890	Chicago Opera House	
February 1, 1890 – July 1, 1905	Auditorium Tower	Automatic rain gauge installed in 1897
July 1, 1905 – December 31, 1925	U.S. Court House	Supplemental observations through 1970
January 1, 1926 – June 30, 1942	University of Chicago	Supplemental observations through 1962
July 1, 1942 – January 16, 1980	Midway Airport	Continues to provide observations
January 17, 1980 – present	O'Hare Airport	

Note: Some of the addresses prior to 1909 are different from the post-1909 addresses

== Classifications ==
Chicago Climate according to major climate systems
Climatic scheme	Initials	Description
Köppen system	Dfa	Hot-summer humid continental climate
Trewartha system	Dca	Continental climate
Alisov system	—N/a	Temperate climate (Note: Mid-latitude temperate interior climate)
Strahler system	—N/a	Moist continental climate
Thornthwaite system	B1 B'1	Humid and mesothermal
Neef system	—N/a	Cool continental climate

== Data ==
Climate data for Chicago (Midway International Airport), 1991–2020 normals, (Note: Mean monthly maxima and minima (i.e. the expected highest and lowest temperature readings at any point during the year or given month) calculated based on data at said location from 1991 to 2020.) extremes 1928–present
Month	Jan	Feb	Mar	Apr	May	Jun	Jul	Aug	Sep	Oct	Nov	Dec	Year
Record high °F (°C)	67 (19)	75 (24)	86 (30)	92 (33)	102 (39)	107 (42)	109 (43)	104 (40)	102 (39)	94 (34)	81 (27)	72 (22)	109 (43)
Mean maximum °F (°C)	53.4 (11.9)	57.9 (14.4)	72.0 (22.2)	81.5 (27.5)	89.2 (31.8)	93.9 (34.4)	96.0 (35.6)	94.2 (34.6)	90.8 (32.7)	82.8 (28.2)	68.0 (20.0)	57.5 (14.2)	97.1 (36.2)
Mean daily maximum °F (°C)	32.8 (0.4)	36.8 (2.7)	47.9 (8.8)	60.0 (15.6)	71.5 (21.9)	81.2 (27.3)	85.2 (29.6)	83.1 (28.4)	76.5 (24.7)	63.7 (17.6)	49.6 (9.8)	37.7 (3.2)	60.5 (15.8)
Daily mean °F (°C)	26.2 (−3.2)	29.9 (−1.2)	39.9 (4.4)	50.9 (10.5)	61.9 (16.6)	71.9 (22.2)	76.7 (24.8)	75.0 (23.9)	67.8 (19.9)	55.3 (12.9)	42.4 (5.8)	31.5 (−0.3)	52.4 (11.3)
Mean daily minimum °F (°C)	19.5 (−6.9)	22.9 (−5.1)	32.0 (0.0)	41.7 (5.4)	52.4 (11.3)	62.7 (17.1)	68.1 (20.1)	66.9 (19.4)	59.2 (15.1)	46.8 (8.2)	35.2 (1.8)	25.3 (−3.7)	44.4 (6.9)
Mean minimum °F (°C)	−3 (−19)	3.4 (−15.9)	14.1 (−9.9)	28.2 (−2.1)	39.1 (3.9)	49.3 (9.6)	58.6 (14.8)	57.6 (14.2)	45.0 (7.2)	31.8 (−0.1)	19.7 (−6.8)	5.3 (−14.8)	−6.5 (−21.4)
Record low °F (°C)	−25 (−32)	−20 (−29)	−7 (−22)	10 (−12)	28 (−2)	35 (2)	46 (8)	43 (6)	29 (−2)	20 (−7)	−3 (−19)	−20 (−29)	−25 (−32)
Average precipitation inches (mm)	2.30 (58)	2.12 (54)	2.66 (68)	4.15 (105)	4.75 (121)	4.53 (115)	4.02 (102)	4.10 (104)	3.33 (85)	3.86 (98)	2.73 (69)	2.33 (59)	40.88 (1,038)
Average snowfall inches (cm)	12.5 (32)	10.1 (26)	5.7 (14)	1.0 (2.5)	0.0 (0.0)	0.0 (0.0)	0.0 (0.0)	0.0 (0.0)	0.0 (0.0)	0.1 (0.25)	1.5 (3.8)	7.9 (20)	38.8 (99)
Average precipitation days (≥ 0.01 in)	11.5	9.4	11.1	12.0	12.4	11.1	10.0	9.3	8.4	10.8	10.2	10.8	127.0
Average snowy days (≥ 0.1 in)	8.9	6.4	3.9	0.9	0.0	0.0	0.0	0.0	0.0	0.2	1.6	6.3	28.2
Average ultraviolet index	1	2	4	6	7	9	9	8	6	4	2	1	5
Source 1: NOAA, WRCC
Source 2: Weather Atlas (UV)

Climate data for Chicago (O'Hare Int'l Airport), 1991–2020 normals, extremes 1871–present (Note: Official records for Chicago were kept at various locations in downtown from January 1871 to December 31, 1925, University of Chicago from January 1, 1926 to June 30, 1942, Midway Airport from July 1, 1942 to January 16, 1980, and at O'Hare Airport since January 17, 1980.)
Month	Jan	Feb	Mar	Apr	May	Jun	Jul	Aug	Sep	Oct	Nov	Dec	Year
Record high °F (°C)	67 (19)	75 (24)	88 (31)	91 (33)	98 (37)	104 (40)	105 (41)	102 (39)	101 (38)	94 (34)	81 (27)	71 (22)	105 (41)
Mean maximum °F (°C)	52.3 (11.3)	56.8 (13.8)	71.0 (21.7)	80.9 (27.2)	88.0 (31.1)	93.1 (33.9)	94.9 (34.9)	93.2 (34.0)	89.7 (32.1)	81.7 (27.6)	67.0 (19.4)	56.4 (13.6)	96.0 (35.6)
Mean daily maximum °F (°C)	31.6 (−0.2)	35.7 (2.1)	47.0 (8.3)	59.0 (15.0)	70.5 (21.4)	80.4 (26.9)	84.5 (29.2)	82.5 (28.1)	75.5 (24.2)	62.7 (17.1)	48.4 (9.1)	36.6 (2.6)	59.5 (15.3)
Daily mean °F (°C)	25.2 (−3.8)	28.8 (−1.8)	39.0 (3.9)	49.7 (9.8)	60.6 (15.9)	70.6 (21.4)	75.4 (24.1)	73.8 (23.2)	66.3 (19.1)	54.0 (12.2)	41.3 (5.2)	30.5 (−0.8)	51.3 (10.7)
Mean daily minimum °F (°C)	18.8 (−7.3)	21.8 (−5.7)	31.0 (−0.6)	40.3 (4.6)	50.6 (10.3)	60.8 (16.0)	66.4 (19.1)	65.1 (18.4)	57.1 (13.9)	45.4 (7.4)	34.1 (1.2)	24.4 (−4.2)	43.0 (6.1)
Mean minimum °F (°C)	−4.5 (−20.3)	0.5 (−17.5)	11.8 (−11.2)	25.6 (−3.6)	36.7 (2.6)	46.0 (7.8)	54.5 (12.5)	54.3 (12.4)	41.8 (5.4)	29.7 (−1.3)	17.3 (−8.2)	3.2 (−16.0)	−8.5 (−22.5)
Record low °F (°C)	−27 (−33)	−21 (−29)	−12 (−24)	7 (−14)	27 (−3)	35 (2)	45 (7)	42 (6)	29 (−2)	14 (−10)	−2 (−19)	−25 (−32)	−27 (−33)
Average precipitation inches (mm)	1.99 (51)	1.97 (50)	2.45 (62)	3.75 (95)	4.49 (114)	4.10 (104)	3.71 (94)	4.25 (108)	3.19 (81)	3.43 (87)	2.42 (61)	2.11 (54)	37.86 (962)
Average snowfall inches (cm)	11.3 (29)	10.7 (27)	5.5 (14)	1.3 (3.3)	0.0 (0.0)	0.0 (0.0)	0.0 (0.0)	0.0 (0.0)	0.0 (0.0)	0.2 (0.51)	1.8 (4.6)	7.6 (19)	38.4 (98)
Average extreme snow depth inches (cm)	6.3 (16)	6.3 (16)	4.0 (10)	0.6 (1.5)	0.0 (0.0)	0.0 (0.0)	0.0 (0.0)	0.0 (0.0)	0.0 (0.0)	0.0 (0.0)	1.5 (3.8)	3.9 (9.9)	9.8 (25)
Average precipitation days (≥ 0.01 in)	11.0	9.4	10.8	12.3	12.5	11.1	9.7	9.4	8.5	10.5	10.0	10.6	125.8
Average snowy days (≥ 0.1 in)	8.5	6.4	4.0	1.0	0.0	0.0	0.0	0.0	0.0	0.2	1.6	6.1	27.8
Average relative humidity (%)	72.2	71.6	69.7	64.9	64.1	65.6	68.5	70.7	71.1	68.6	72.5	75.5	69.6
Average dew point °F (°C)	13.6 (−10.2)	17.6 (−8.0)	27.1 (−2.7)	35.8 (2.1)	45.7 (7.6)	55.8 (13.2)	61.7 (16.5)	61.0 (16.1)	53.8 (12.1)	41.7 (5.4)	31.6 (−0.2)	20.1 (−6.6)	38.8 (3.8)
Mean monthly sunshine hours	135.8	136.2	187.0	215.3	281.9	311.4	318.4	283.0	226.6	193.2	113.3	106.3	2,508.4
Percentage possible sunshine	46	46	51	54	62	68	69	66	60	56	38	37	56
Source: NOAA (relative humidity, dew point and sun 1961–1990)

Climate data for Northerly Island, 2005-2023 Temperature normals
Month	Jan	Feb	Mar	Apr	May	Jun	Jul	Aug	Sep	Oct	Nov	Dec	Year
Mean maximum °F (°C)	51 (11)	55 (13)	70 (21)	80 (27)	87 (31)	92 (33)	94 (34)	93 (34)	90 (32)	82 (28)	68 (20)	58 (14)	94 (34)
Mean daily maximum °F (°C)	33.2 (0.7)	34.8 (1.6)	46.4 (8.0)	55.7 (13.2)	67.0 (19.4)	76.9 (24.9)	81.8 (27.7)	81.1 (27.3)	74.9 (23.8)	62.4 (16.9)	49.8 (9.9)	38.0 (3.3)	58.5 (14.7)
Daily mean °F (°C)	27.2 (−2.7)	28.3 (−2.1)	39.9 (4.4)	48.6 (9.2)	59.3 (15.2)	69.4 (20.8)	75.2 (24.0)	74.9 (23.8)	68.5 (20.3)	55.9 (13.3)	43.5 (6.4)	32.3 (0.2)	51.9 (11.1)
Mean daily minimum °F (°C)	21.1 (−6.1)	21.9 (−5.6)	33.3 (0.7)	41.4 (5.2)	51.6 (10.9)	62.0 (16.7)	68.7 (20.4)	68.7 (20.4)	62.0 (16.7)	49.5 (9.7)	37.3 (2.9)	26.7 (−2.9)	45.4 (7.4)
Mean minimum °F (°C)	0 (−18)	3 (−16)	20 (−7)	31 (−1)	41 (5)	52 (11)	62 (17)	61 (16)	50 (10)	37 (3)	21 (−6)	8 (−13)	0 (−18)
Source: National Weather Service

== Seasons ==
Chicago

Climate chart (precipitation, max. and min. temperature)
J	F	M	A	M	J	J	A	S	O	N	D
2.1 32 18	1.9 36 22	2.7 47 31	3.6 59 42	4.1 70 52	4.1 80 62	4 84 68	4 82 66	3.3 75 58	3.2 63 46	3.4 49 35	2.6 35 23
- █ Average max. and min. temperatures in °F
- █ Precipitation totals in inches
- Source: NOAA
Metric conversion
J	F	M	A	M	J	J	A	S	O	N	D
52 0 −8	49 2 −6	69 8 −1	92 15 5	105 21 11	103 27 17	102 29 20	101 28 19	84 24 14	82 17 8	87 9 1	65 2 −5
- █ Average max. and min. temperatures in °C
- █ Precipitation totals in mm

=== Winter ===
Winter in Chicago is generally cold and snowy. The city typically sees less snow in winter than other major cities near the Great Lakes, such as Cleveland or Buffalo, but more snow than on the East Coast in cities like Washington, D.C., or New York City. Seasonal snowfall in the city has ranged from 9.8 inches (24.9 cm) (in 1920–21) up to 89.7 in (228 cm) (in 1978–79), and the average annual snowfall in Chicago is 36 inches (91 cm). Most winters produce many snowfalls during the season with light accumulations of around 2 in (5.1 cm). Cities on the other side of Lake Michigan usually receive more snow than Chicago because of the lake-effect snow that falls on these communities, even though northeasterly winds can sometimes bring lake-effect snow to Chicago area too. However, every three years or so during the winter Chicago experiences a heavier snowstorm that can produce over 10 in (25 cm) of snow over a 1- to 3-day period, a level of snowfall very often seen in cities on the "snowbelt" on other side of the lake such as Grand Rapids, Michigan, Kalamazoo, Michigan, and South Bend, Indiana.

Winter temperatures are generally cold. However, like much of the northern USA, they can vary tremendously within the span of one week. The daily average high temperature in January at O'Hare is 31.0 °F (−0.6 °C) ,with the average daily low of 16.5 °F (−8.6 °C) and the daily mean of 23.6 °F (−4.7 °C). Temperatures drop to or below 0 °F (−18 °C) on 5.5 nights annually at Midway and 8.2 nights at O'Hare, and up to 10–14 nights in some far western and northern suburbs, although subzero (°F) readings in the absence of snow cover are rare. There have been streaks of multiple winter seasons without a single subzero reading, yet, there have also been winters with 20 or more subzero readings. The highest temperature recorded during the meteorological winter months of December, January, and February is 75 °F (24 °C), set on February 27, 1976. The lowest temperature recorded during meteorological winter is −27 °F (−33 °C), set on January 20, 1985. In addition, the all-time record low maximum temperature of −11 °F (−24 °C) was set on December 24, 1983, and tied on January 18, 1994. However, in late January 2019, a violent polar vortex drifted southward, enveloping the city in new record-breaking temperatures as low as −23 °F (−31 °C) on January 30, though the city just missed out on tying the all-time record low maximum temperature, recording a high of −10 °F (−23 °C) one day during the outbreak. Wind speeds reached at least 32 kilometres per hour (20 miles per hour), exacerbating the wind chill effect.

The warming effect of Lake Michigan during the winter makes subzero temperatures somewhat less common on the lakefront than in the more inland parts of the city. Highs reach 50 °F (10 °C) an average of 8.8 days each winter from December to February at Midway.

Based on 30-year averages obtained from NOAA's National Climatic Data Center for the months of December, January, and February, The Weather Channel ranked Chicago as the sixth-coldest major U.S. city as of 2014.

Although it is extremely rare, temperatures during late (astronomical) winter (generally March 1–20) can reach up to and well over 80 °F (27 °C). In 2012, there were eight days in the month of March with temperatures 80 °F (27 °C)+ (with a ninth day occurring in many suburban areas) during the record-breaking March 2012 North American heat wave. The last couple of 80 °F (27 °C) days in this record-breaking stretch of warmth occurred after the vernal equinox.

=== Spring ===
Spring in Chicago is perhaps the city's most unpredictable season: Winter weather can persist well into April or even into early May, with the 1953-54 winter in Chicago lasting from November until May, as measured by the timespan between the first and last measurable snows of the season. Thunderstorms can occur any time of the year but are most prevalent in the springtime, as the city's central location within the United States, as well as its lakeside location, makes it a center of conflicts between large volumes of warm and cold air, which can trigger a wide variety of severe weather. The most severe storms can contain large hail, damaging straight-line winds, flooding, and tornadoes. Since 1850, 23 tornadoes have struck the Chicago city limits. During thunderstorms, lightning strikes are seen to frequently hit Chicago's skyscrapers.

Large snowfalls have occurred in late March and in early April. In 1970, over 10 in (25 cm) of snow fell in a storm that occurred on April 1–2. Twelve years later, Opening Day for the Chicago White Sox was postponed due to another 9-inch (23 cm) snowfall that had occurred on April 5. Even more extraordinarily, over 18 in (46 cm) of snow fell on March 25–26, 1930, which remains one of the city's five biggest recorded snowstorms despite occurring after the vernal equinox. The average date for the last measurable snowfall (≥0.1 in or 0.25 cm) is April 1.

Temperatures vary tremendously in the springtime; at 100 °F (38 °C), March is the month with the greatest span between the record high and low. At O'Hare, temperatures as low as 7 and 31 °F (−14 and −1 °C) have been recorded as late as April 7 and May 21, respectively. Conversely, in official records, the earliest 100 °F (38 °C) high occurred on June 1, 1934, when official readings were taken closer to Lake Michigan. Though rare, triple-digit heat has occurred in late May at Midway Airport and in outlying suburban locations. Typically, the last freezing low of the season on average occurs on April 13 at Midway and ten days later at O'Hare. The highest temperature recorded during the meteorological spring months of March, April, and May is, officially, 98 °F (37 °C) on May 31, 1934, when weather records were still taken near Lake Michigan. The lowest temperature recorded in meteorological spring is −12 °F (−24 °C), set on March 4, 1873.

During the springtime, the effects of Lake Michigan are most prevalent. During this season, the lake is still quite cold, as the effects of much warmer temperatures are slow to affect the large body of water of Lake Michigan. It is common for Lake Michigan shoreline and water temperatures to remain in the 40s even into May. If the winds blow from the east, or from Lake Michigan into the city, a wide discrepancy in temperatures in a matter of miles can be found, especially on particularly warm days. It is not uncommon for high temperatures to be officially recorded in the 80s or lower 90s °F (27–34 °C), particularly in early June, at O'Hare, Midway, and in suburban locations but to have temperatures be 20 to 30 °F (11 to 17 °C) cooler along the immediate lakeshore.

=== Summer ===
On a typical summer day, humidity is usually moderately high, and temperatures ordinarily reach anywhere between 78 and 92 °F (26 and 33 °C). In July, it is not uncommon for the temperature to go around 90 and 93 °F (32 and 34 °C). Overnight temperatures in summer usually drop to around 65–70 °F (18–21 °C), although even in July and August there can be several nights where the temperature drops below 60 °F (16 °C), particularly during the cooler summers, and it is not uncommon to see temperatures plummet lower than 50 °F (10 °C). Conversely, on the other extreme, temperatures can on a rare basis remain above 80 °F (27 °C) overnight, though this level of overnight warmth is generally limited to the city proper with its urban heat island effects along with Lake Michigan nearby. On such warm nights, especially during strong heat waves, most suburban locations drop down to between 75 and 79 °F (24 and 26 °C) but quickly rebound in the early morning hours. During such strong heat waves, the outlying suburban areas can record temperatures more than 5 °F (2.8 °C) above city and lakeshore locations.

A perfect example of such an occurrence happening, although considered "unofficial", occurred during the Dust Bowl years. Midway Airport recorded a record eight consecutive 100 °F-plus days in July 1936. In that heat wave, temperatures at the lake remained in the middle and upper 90s Fahrenheit (middle 30s Celsius), whereas Midway Airport recorded temperatures over 100 °F (38 °C) for nearly two weeks, peaking at 107 °F (42 °C) on July 11. The official record high for Chicago for July 11 is also from 1936—but is recorded as just 97 °F (36 °C). Further west in what would today be the near and far suburbs (e.g. DuPage County and westward), temperatures reached a blistering 110 °F (43 °C) or still higher at points during this massive heat wave. These extreme temperatures are not shown in the official records because daily weather observations were taken at the University of Chicago until 1942. The University of Chicago is close to the lake, which can and does reduce temperatures in the immediate shoreline area in the summer.

The highest temperature recorded in Chicago during the meteorological summer months of June, July, and August, which is also additionally the all-time record high in the city, is 105 °F (41 °C), set on July 24, 1934, though at Midway Airport, a future observation site, the temperature reached 109 °F (43 °C). The lowest temperature recorded in the meteorological summer months is 35 °F (2 °C), set on June 4, 1945. In addition, the all-time record high minimum temperature of 85 °F (29 °C) was set on July 29, 1916.

Chicago's yearly precipitation comes in at an average of about 36 inches (910 mm), but during the summer, rain arises from short-lived hit-or-miss rain rather than actual prolonged rainfalls, and thunderstorms also occur with regularity at night. Derechos are also common during the summertime, the most notable being, the August 4, 2008 derecho, which produced five tornadoes across the Chicago area and killed one person. In a normal summer, temperatures exceed 90 °F (32 °C) on 23 days. Summer is both the rainiest and sunniest season in Chicago; only the three months of June through August experience more than 65% of possible sunshine.

In July 2012, during the 2012 North American heat wave, Chicago reached and exceeded 100 °F (38 °C) for three consecutive days at O'Hare Airport with highs reaching 103 °F (39 °C) in the city and many suburban areas recording temperatures between 105 and 110 °F (41 and 43 °C). It was the first time in 65 years that Chicago had ever seen a triad of 100 °F (38 °C) days. Chicago nearly recorded a fourth consecutive 100 °F (38 °C) day, but the temperature reached 98 °F (37 °C) at O'Hare in late morning before a weak cold front came through the area and cooled temperatures off slightly in the city area, holding in the lower 90s degrees Fahrenheit (32 to 34 degrees C). The effects of the cold front did not affect many suburban areas, as temperatures reached or exceeded 100 °F (38 °C) for a fourth consecutive day throughout much of the region.

During the summer, Lake Michigan continues to have an effect on Chicago weather, but it is not as common or as strong as it is during the spring months. On very hot days, temperatures can still be cooler along the immediate shoreline and slightly inland of the lake if winds blow from the east. Temperatures can be held in the 70s or 80s °F (22 to 31 °C) in these areas while outlying and suburban areas temperatures are rising well into the 90s °F (33 to 37 °C). Temperatures can also reach extreme levels of heat on the immediate shoreline, such as when the air temperature reached 105 °F (41 °C) at Northerly Island during the aforementioned July 2012 heat wave.

=== Autumn ===
The extreme heat that Chicago is capable of experiencing during the height of the summer season can persist into the autumn season. Temperatures have reached 100 °F (38 °C) as late as September 7 (with 99 °F (37 °C) occurring as late as September 29), and temperatures have reached 90 °F (32 °C) as late as October 6, which occurred in 1963, with a temperature of 94 °F (34 °C) on that day. Conversely, temperatures have dropped to freezing overnight as early as September 23, and temperatures below 0 °F (−18 °C) have arrived as early as November 23. The first freeze of the season on average occurs on October 24 at Midway and 11 days earlier at O'Hare. Although extremely rare, temperatures at or above 70 °F (21 °C) have been recorded into early December, most recently in 2012 when 70 °F (21 °C) was recorded on December 3, some surrounding areas reaching temperatures as high as 72 °F (22 °C) to 75 °F (24 °C).

Autumn, in some ways, is a calmer season than any of the other three in Chicago. However, wild weather can and does occur in the region during this season. In most years, a period of warm weather, known as an Indian summer, occurs well after the autumnal equinox has occurred. In these so-called Indian summers, unusually warm weather can persist for several days well into October, and in particularly warm autumns, into November. For example, during the 2005 American League Division Series, for both home games between the Chicago White Sox and the Boston Red Sox, temperatures soared to near 90 °F (32 °C), despite the fact that it was already well into October. On top of that, during the same warm stretch in October 2005, for two consecutive days the overnight temperature failed to drop below 70 °F (21 °C), a rare occurrence for Chicago in October. Another example occurred in November 2020, when a week-long stretch of temperatures in the low to mid 70s occurred, including two of the eleven warmest high temperatures in November records from November 4 through 10.

The highest temperature recorded during the meteorological autumn months of September, October, and November is 101 °F (38 °C), set on back to back days, September 1–2, 1953, closely followed by Chicago's latest 100 °F (38 °C) on September 7, 1960. The lowest temperature recorded during the meteorological autumn months is −2 °F (−19 °C), set on November 29, 1872, and tied on November 24, 1950.

Autumn can bring heavy rain showers, some of which are capable of producing serious flooding. As the winter solstice nears, the threat of a major winter or snowstorm grows, and there have been major winter storms around the Thanksgiving holiday, causing major delays at the city's two major airports. The first measurable ≥0.1 in (0.25 cm) snow on average falls on November 19. However, in the 2012–13 winter season, the first measurable snow did not fall until December 20, 2012, eclipsing the previous record of December 17, 1899. The 2012–13 autumn/winter season would fail to produce a daily maximum temperature below freezing 32 °F (0 °C) until January 1, 2013, the first such time that has happened in Chicago weather records. The entire calendar year of 2012 did not record a temperature lower than 5 °F (−15 °C). The largest snowstorm before the winter solstice dropped 14.8 inches (380 mm) at Midway Airport in December 1929.

During the autumn, the effects of Lake Michigan are usually reversed from the spring or summer, particularly in the late autumn. Temperatures near the immediate lakeshore can be a few degrees warmer than in outlying areas, especially during nighttime due to the delayed effects of cooler temperatures on the large body of water. It is rare, though possible, during the Indian summer when unusually warm temperatures are occurring in the inland areas of the city and suburbs for temperatures to be somewhat cooler along the lake as often happens during the spring season.

== Extremes ==
The highest temperature ever recorded in the Chicago city limits is an unofficial 109 °F (43 °C) on July 24, 1934, at Midway Airport. The official reading of 105 °F (41 °C) for that day was taken at the University of Chicago campus near the shoreline off Lake Michigan. The 41 °C (105 °F) high that day is the highest official temperature ever recorded in the city. On July 29, 1916, the low temperature sank to only 85 °F (29 °C). Many suburban, exurban and rural locations have all-time records that have surpassed 110 °F (43 °C), many of which were set during a heat wave in July 1936, when a massive heat wave engulfed the entire Chicago and northern Illinois region, resulting in eight consecutive days at or above 100 °F (38 °C) at Midway Airport, peaking at 107 °F (42 °C) on July 11, 1936. Around the region, many sites recorded at least 10 days at or above 38 °C (100 °F), including 15 consecutive days at or above 38 °C (100 °F) in south rural LaSalle, which recorded an average high temperature of 100.8 °F (38.2 °C) for the month of July, 1936. Temperatures peaked as high as 112 °F (44 °C) in Rockford. The official observations were taken at the University of Chicago, resulting in the official records remaining mostly in the mid-90s, with one day peaking at 102 °F (39 °C), masking the true nature of the heat wave and illustrating the power of Lake Michigan's cooling effects in immediate shoreline areas. Official observations were not moved to Midway Airport in 1942.

Summertime readings near the lake can be several degrees cooler than inland locations, especially if lake breezes are present, which suggests that the higher unofficial reading may also be accurate. During the Chicago Heat Wave of 1995, which killed 739 people, official temperatures reached 104 °F (40 °C) at O'Hare Airport and 106 °F (41 °C) at Midway; high humidity pushed the heat index to 15–20 °F (8–11 °C) above actual air temperatures, resulting in heat indexes well over 120 °F (49 °C).

The coldest temperature ever recorded in Chicago city limits is −27 °F (−33 °C) at O'Hare on January 20, 1985, though unofficial temperatures as low as −33 °F (−36 °C) have been recorded at Chicago Aurora Airport in far western suburbs and in the rural areas to the west of Chicago. On December 24, 1983, and January 18, 1994, the high temperature reached only −11 °F (−24 °C).

The greatest 24-hour precipitation, in a single calendar day, was 6.86 in (174.2 mm) at O'Hare on July 23, 2011. The greatest amount of precipitation that fell in a 24-hour period was 9.35 in (237.5 mm) on August 13–14, 1987. That event also set the records for heaviest 6 and 12 hour rainfall amounts and contributed to August 1987's record rainfall. The heaviest calendar day snowfall was 18.6 in (47.2 cm), again at O'Hare, on January 2, 1999. Daily snow depth has amassed as high as 29 in (74 cm) on January 14, 1979; as of 2019, January 1979 alone holds the first 8 of the top 10 daily snow-depth measurements.

Official monthly mean temperatures have ranged from 10.1 °F (−12.2 °C) in January 1977 to 81.3 °F (27.4 °C) in July 1955, both recorded at Midway, while the annual mean temperature has ranged from 45.1 °F (7.3 °C) in 1875, as recorded at the Roanoke Building, to 54.5 °F (12.5 °C), as recorded at O'Hare. The driest month on record has been September 1979 with a mere 0.01 in (0.25 mm) of rainfall, while the wettest is August 1987 with 17.10 in (434 mm) of rainfall; annual precipitation has ranged from 22.22 in (564 mm) in 1962 to 50.86 in (1,292 mm) in 2008.

== Windy City ==
Chicago is known as the Windy City. The "Windy City" moniker did not originally refer to Chicago's climate. It is believed to have been created by a New York newspaper writer deriding Chicagoans' bluster as they promoted their city as the site of the 1893 Columbian Exposition. It is also believed to be called the "Windy City" because of politicians in the area blowing hot air. In terms of climate, Chicago is slightly windier than the average American city. Average wind speeds range from 8 miles per hour (13 km/h) in summer to 12 miles per hour (19 km/h) in spring.

== Lake breeze ==
Chicago can be cooler and moister than other parts of Illinois because of its proximity to the relatively cooler waters of Lake Michigan, effects which are most pronounced during spring and early summer. A frequent lakeshore breeze pushes much cooler, moister air into Chicago than the usual hot air of the Plains States (usually a moist air mass depending on upper-level circulation), but the effect can be so localized that only the immediate waterfront neighborhoods (both north and southside lake adjacent communities) are cooler than inland parts of the city. (This is where the oft-repeated weather-forecast phrase “cooler by the lake" comes from.) South, west and southwestern suburbs can be more than 20°F (11°C) warmer than the lakefront at some times of year. The lake breeze also has other effects, including dense fog spilling into the city. Because of the closed-loop circulation pattern with a lake breeze that moves back and forth across the city, it is thought to significantly increase low-level ozone counts. Differing wind direction on either side of the thermal dividing line allows for sharp updrafts under certain conditions, favorable to thunderstorm development. Offshore or land breezes shutdown the lake breeze and can have the opposite effect, with over lake convection occurring, usually in mid- to late summer and autumn. As a general rule, the opposite trend occurs during the winter—winter temperatures are warmer along the lakeshore and downtown than inland.

== See also ==
- Tornadoes in Chicago
