= Otter Lake, Indiana =

- Census-designated place
- Location within Indiana Location within the United States
- Coordinates: 41°38′12″N 85°10′05″W
- Country: United States
- State: Indiana
- County: Steuben
- Township: Jackson

Area
  - Total: 0.67 sq mi (1.7 km^{2})
  - Land: 0.50 sq mi (1.3 km^{2})
  - Water: 0.17 sq mi (0.44 km^{2})
- Elevation: 935 ft (285 m)
- Time zone: UTC-5 (Eastern (EST))
  - Summer (DST): UTC-4 (EDT)
- ZIP code: 46703 (Angola)
- Area code: 260
- FIPS code: 18-57330
- GNIS feature ID: 2830546

Otter Lake is an unincorporated community and census-designated place (CDP) in Steuben County, Indiana, United States.

== Geography ==
The community is in western Steuben County, surrounding Otter Lake, a natural water body. U.S. Route 20 forms the northern edge of the CDP; the highway leads east 9 miles (14 km) to Angola, the county seat, and west 13 miles (21 km) to LaGrange. Indiana State Road 327 forms the western edge of the community, leading north 6 miles (10 km) to Orland and south 21 miles (34 km) to Garrett.

According to the U.S. Census Bureau, the Otter Lake CDP has a total area of 0.67 square miles (1.74 km^{2}), of which 0.50 square miles (1.29 km^{2}) are land and 0.17 square miles (0.44 km^{2}), or 25.37%, are water. The lake's outlet is at its northern end, flowing into Pigeon Creek, which becomes the Pigeon River, a west-flowing tributary of the St. Joseph River leading to Lake Michigan.

== Demographics ==
The United States Census Bureau defined Otter Lake as a census designated place in the 2022 American Community Survey.
