= National Lock Company =

American lock and hardware manufacturer

- Industry: Hardware manufacturing
- Founded: 1903
- Founders: Frank G. Hogland, Levin Faust, and Emil C. Traner
- Headquarters: Rockford, Illinois, United States
- Products: Locks, cabinet hardware, fasteners, and metal and plastic components
- Parent: Keystone Steel & Wire Company (from 1939)

The National Lock Company was an American manufacturer of locks, hardware, and fasteners based in Rockford, Illinois. Founded in 1903 to supply the city's furniture industry, it grew from a small producer of mortise locks into one of Rockford's largest industrial employers. Keystone Steel & Wire Company acquired control in 1939, and the business was later divided into hardware and fastener operations. Its hardware division left Rockford in the early 1980s, while remaining local operations continued under the National Metalcrafters name.

== History ==
=== Founding and expansion ===
Frank G. Hogland, Levin Faust, and Emil C. Traner organized National Lock in 1903 with $3,300 in paid-in capital and eight employees. The company rented space in Rockford's Water Power District and initially produced locks and other hardware for furniture. Industrialist P. A. Peterson helped finance the company's early expansion and later served as its president, while Hogland managed the business and remained president until his death in 1938.

Rapid growth led the company to move to Eighteenth Avenue in 1906. It erected a four-story factory near Seventh Street in 1909 and added further buildings, including a six-story concrete plant in 1919. By 1920, National Lock was one of Rockford's largest employers, and its factory complex eventually extended across several city blocks.

The product line expanded beyond cabinet locks to screws, bolts, hinges, school locks, appliance hardware, and furniture trim. The company added threaded fasteners before World War I and entered refrigerator- and stove-hardware production during the late 1920s and early 1930s.

=== Keystone ownership and wartime growth ===
National Lock experienced financial difficulty during the Great Depression, including a 20-week strike in 1933. After Hogland died in 1938, company president A. J. Strandquist negotiated with Keystone Steel & Wire, a creditor of the company. Keystone bought control of National Lock for $482,000 in May 1939.

Production and employment expanded during World War II. National Lock manufactured military hardware and components, including ammunition-case fittings and aircraft fasteners. Employment reached about 4,200 at its early-1940s peak. Workers organized under the United Auto Workers in 1946, and postwar demand kept the plants operating at high capacity.

In 1957, after repeated additions had crowded the original factory complex, part of the company's operations moved to a plant near the Rockford airport. During the 1960s, foreign competition reduced the market for standard fasteners, and National Lock shifted toward specialized fasteners, plastics, and decorative household hardware.

=== Division and later operations ===
Keystone divided the Rockford business in 1971 into the National Lock Hardware Division and the National Lock Fastener Division. The hardware division's relocation to Spartanburg, South Carolina, was announced in 1982, contributing to a prolonged labor dispute and leaving the older Rockford hardware plant vacant. The remaining Rockford operations used the name National Metalcrafters and produced specialty fasteners and formed-metal products.

National Metalcrafters continued to operate Rockford manufacturing facilities as a division of Keystone Consolidated Industries in 1985. A federal court case that year arose from vacation-pay claims connected with a strike that had begun in 1983.

National Lock also influenced Rockford's wider manufacturing sector. Former executives told the Rockford Register Star that workers trained at the company later helped establish numerous local metalworking firms, including Amerock, Camcar, Elco Industries, and Rockford Products.
