= National Weather Service Chicago =

Weather forecast office of the National Weather Service

National Weather Service Chicago, currently based in Romeoville, Illinois, at Lewis University, is a weather forecast office responsible for monitoring weather conditions for 23 counties in Northern Illinois, the Chicago metropolitan area and Northwest Indiana. The Army Signal Service established the first federal weather office in the region in Chicago on October 15, 1870. During May 1894 the Chicago Weather Bureau was given a new forecast area extending from the Great Lakes region all the way to the Rocky Mountains. The current National Weather Service Chicago is located in Romeoville and is in charge of issuing local forecasts and weather warnings for the Chicago area. It is one of only two National Weather Service offices in Illinois, the other being National Weather Service Central Illinois in Lincoln, Illinois. The National Weather Service Chicago forecast office is located adjacent to the Lewis University Airport in Romeoville, Illinois.

== NOAA Weather Radio ==

National Weather Service Chicago Forecast Office in Romeoville, Illinois, currently provides programming for 11 NOAA Weather Radio stations.

=== KWO39 Chicago ===
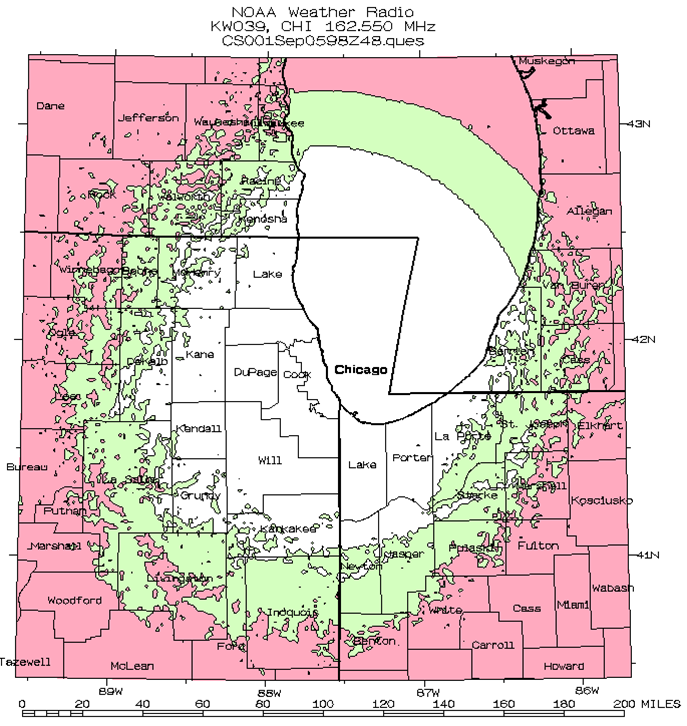
Coverage Area of KWO39 in Chicago

KWO39
- Chicago, Illinois
- Frequency: 162.550 MHz

Programming
- Language: English
- Format: Weather/Civil Emergency

History
- First air date: 1954

Technical information
- Class: C
- Power: 300 Watts
- HAAT: 452 M

Links
- Website: Official website

KWO39 regular programming serves marine interests on southern Lake Michigan and the Illinois and Indiana lake-shore. KWO39 also carries severe weather watches and warnings for Cook, DuPage, and Lake counties in Illinois, plus Lake and Porter counties in Indiana.

==== History ====
This station first began in 1954 as the first weather radio system in the Chicago area dedicated to the aviation user and continued until 1958 when the aviation broadcast went dark. Ivan Brunk, meteorologist in charge of the Chicago U.S. Weather Bureau (now National Weather Service) office at that time, suggested that the radio service be reinstated and put to Marine usage on an experimental basis. The marine weather broadcast was an immediate success, and the service became permanent two years later.

Throughout the 1960s, programming was expanded to include weather information for the general public, as well as the marine community. In the early 1970s, the forecast office moved from the University of Chicago to a location on West Pershing Rd. The 300 watt transmitter was located on the roof of the six-story building where it remained until 1975 when the transmitter was relocated to the Sears Tower (now Willis Tower).

=== KZZ81 Lockport ===
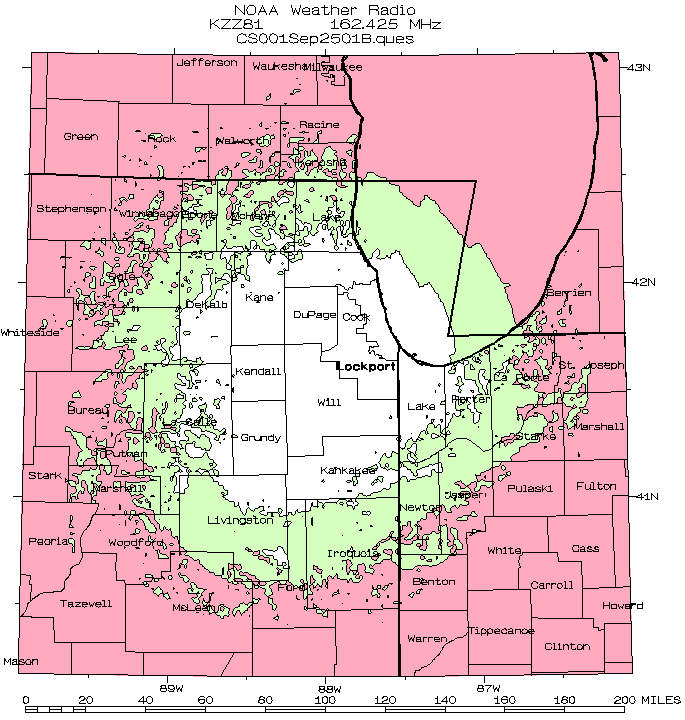
Coverage Area of KZZ81 in Lockport

KZZ81
- Lockport, Illinois
- Broadcast area: Chicago metropolitan area
- Frequency: 162.425 MHz

Programming
- Language: English
- Format: Weather/Civil Emergency

Technical information
- Class: C
- Power: 1,000 Watts
- HAAT: 91 M

Links
- Website: Official website

KZZ81 broadcasts weather and hazard information for Cook, DuPage, Grundy, Kane, Kankakee, Kendall, Lake, & Will counties in Illinois as well as Lake County in Indiana.

Hourly conditions on this station are reported for the following locations: O'Hare Airport, The Lakefront, Joliet, Aurora, Waukegan, Springfield, Bloomington, Midway Airport, Rockford, Kankakee, Peru, Pontiac, Rantoul, Wheeling, Morris, Moline, Milwaukee, Madison, Wisconsin.

=== KXI41 Crystal Lake ===
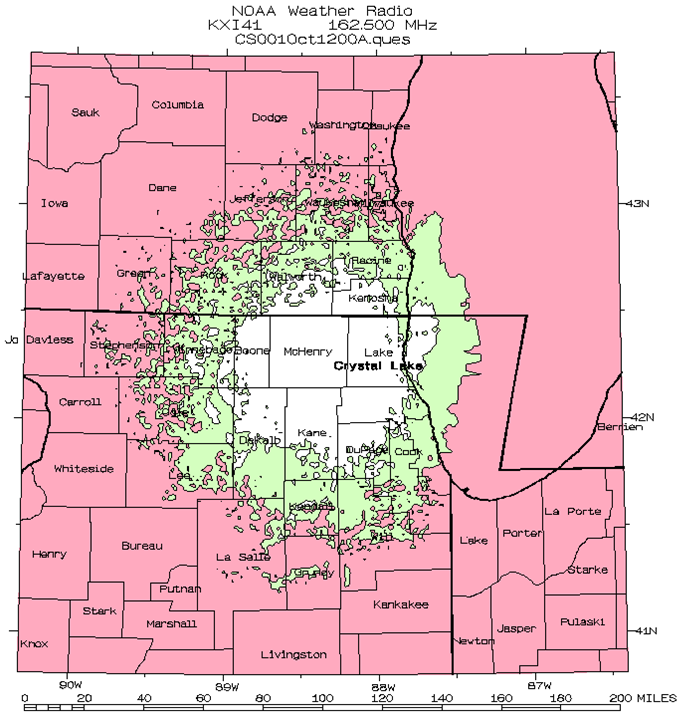
Coverage Area of KXI41 in Crystal Lake

KXI41
- Crystal Lake, Illinois
- Frequency: 162.500 MHz

Programming
- Language: English

Technical information
- Class: C
- Power: 300 Watts
- HAAT: 96 M

Links
- Website: Official website

KXI41 broadcasts weather and hazard information for Boone, Cook, Kane, Lake, & McHenry counties in Illinois, plus Kenosha & Walworth counties in Wisconsin.

=== KXI58 Plano ===
KXI58
- Plano, Illinois
- Frequency: 162.400 MHz

Programming
- Language: English
- Format: Weather/Civil Emergency

Technical information
- Power: 300 Watts

Links
- Website: Official website

KXI58 broadcasts weather and hazard information for DeKalb, DuPage, Grundy, Kane, Kendall, LaSalle, & Will counties in Illinois.

=== KZZ57 Rockford ===
KZZ57
- Rockford, Illinois
- Broadcast area: Rockford / Northern Illinois / Southern Wisconsin
- Frequency: 162.475 MHz

Programming
- Language: English

Technical information
- Power: 1,000 Watts

Links
- Website: Official website

KZZ57 broadcasts weather and hazard information for Winnebago, Boone, Ogle, DeKalb, Lee & Stephenson counties in Illinois, plus Green & Rock counties in Wisconsin.

Programming for most counties is provided from the National Weather Service Chicago Forecast Office in Romeoville, Illinois, with warnings for Stephenson County being issued by the National Weather Service office in Davenport, Iowa, and Green and Rock counties in Wisconsin being issued by the National Weather Service office in Milwaukee, Wisconsin.

=== WXK24 Odell ===
WXK24
- Odell, Illinois
- Broadcast area: Pontiac / Gibson City / Morris / Ottawa, Illinois
- Frequency: 162.450 MHz

Programming
- Language: English

Technical information
- Class: C
- Power: 1,000 Watts

Links
- Website: Official website

WXK24 broadcasts weather and hazard information for LaSalle, Grundy, Livingston, Ford, Will, Kankakee, Iroquois, Marshall, Woodford & McLean counties in Illinois.

Programming for most counties is provided from the National Weather Service Chicago Forecast Office in Romeoville, Illinois, with warnings for Marshall, Woodford, and McLean Counties being issued by the National Weather Service Central Illinois located in Lincoln, Illinois.

=== WNG536 DeKalb ===
WNG536
- DeKalb, Illinois
- Frequency: 162.550 MHz

Programming
- Language: English

Technical information
- Class: C
- Power: 300 Watts

Links
- Website: Official website

WNG536 broadcasts weather and hazard information for DeKalb, Boone, Winnebago, Ogle, Lee & Kane counties in Illinois.

=== KXI86 Crescent City ===
KXI86
- Crescent City, Illinois
- Frequency: 162.500 MHz

Programming
- Language: English

Technical information
- Power: 300 Watts

Links
- Website: Official website

KXI86 broadcasts weather and hazard information for Ford, Kankakee, Iroquois, & Vermilion Counties in Illinois, as well as Newton & Benton Counties in Indiana.

Programming for most counties is provided from the National Weather Service Chicago Forecast Office in Romeoville, Illinois, with warnings for Vermilion County being issued by the National Weather Service Central Illinois located in Lincoln, Illinois.

=== KZZ55 Dixon ===
KZZ55
- Dixon, Illinois
- Frequency: 162.525 MHz

Programming
- Language: English

Technical information
- Power: 300 Watts

Links
- Website: Official website

KZZ55 broadcasts weather and hazard information for Ogle, Lee, Carroll, Whiteside & Bureau Counties in Illinois.

Programming for Ogle and Lee counties is provided from the National Weather Service Chicago Forecast Office in Romeoville, Illinois, with warnings for Carroll Whiteside & Bureau counties being issued by the National Weather Service office located in Davenport, Iowa.

=== KZZ58 Kankakee ===
KZZ58
- Kankakee, Illinois
- Frequency: 162.525 MHz

Programming
- Language: English

Technical information
- Power: 300 Watts

Links
- Website: Official website

KZZ58 broadcasts weather and hazard information for Kankakee, Iroquois & Will Counties in Illinois, as well as Newton & Lake Counties in Indiana.

=== WNG689 Hebron ===
WNG689
- Hebron, Indiana
- Frequency: 162.450 MHz

Programming
- Language: English

Technical information
- Power: 300 Watts

Links
- Website: Official website

WNG689 broadcasts weather and hazard information for Lake, Porter, Newton, Jasper, LaPorte, Starke & Pulaski Counties in Indiana.

Programming for most counties is provided from the National Weather Service Chicago Forecast Office in Romeoville, Illinois, with warnings for LaPorte, Starke, and Pulaski Counties being issued by the National Weather Service Northern Indiana located in Syracuse, Indiana.

== First-order/climate sites ==
- O'Hare International Airport (Chicago)
- Chicago Rockford International Airport (Rockford)

== See also ==
- Tornadoes in Chicago
