= Severe weather sequence of July 13–16, 2024 =

Wind, tornado, and flooding event in the United States

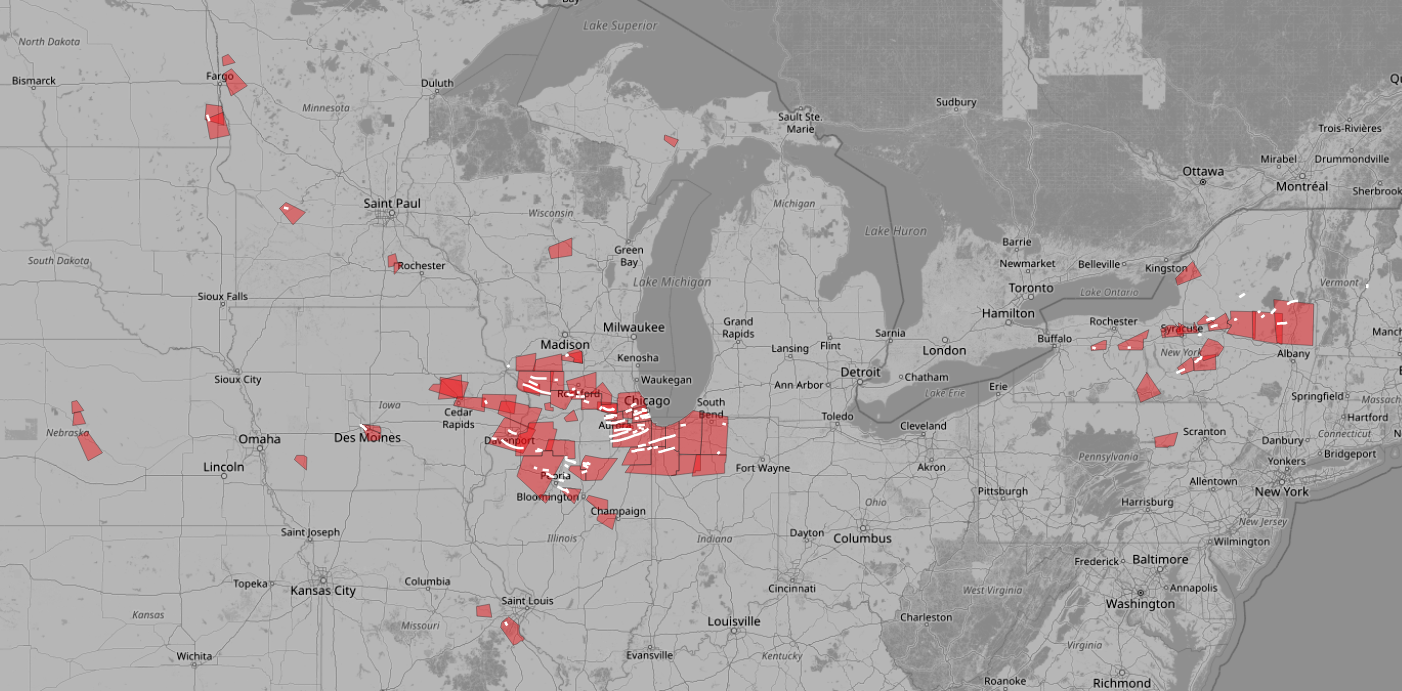
- Map of confirmed tornadoes during the outbreak (indicated in white) and tornado warnings issued during the outbreak (indicated in red).

Meteorological history
- Formed: July 13, 2024
- Dissipated: July 16, 2024

Tornado outbreak
- Tornadoes: 94 (Record for a continuous outbreak in July)
- Max. rating: EF2 tornado
- Highest winds: 135 mph (217 km/h) (Rome, New York on July 16)

Derecho (July 13–14)
- Highest gusts: 109 mph (175 km/h) (Stanley County, South Dakota)

Derecho (July 15)
- Highest gusts: 105 mph (169 km/h) (Camp Grove, Illinois
- Max. rainfall: 7.8 in (20 cm) (Fulton County, Illinois)

Overall effects
- Fatalities: 5
- Injuries: 3
- Evacuated: 200 homes
- Damage: $2.4 billion
- Power outages: >500,000
- Part of the Weather of 2024 and Tornadoes of 2024

Starting on the evening of July 13 and extending through July 16, 2024, an intense sequence of severe weather outbreaks affected much of the Midwestern and Northeastern United States. This included two significant derechos that each had wind gusts exceeding 100 mph (160 km/h), as well as multiple tornado outbreaks that produced a combined 94 tornadoes across the affected areas. A ring of fire pattern fueled multiple systems that brought heavy rain and a tornado outbreak to northern Illinois, contributing to a partial dam failure in Washington County, Illinois, and multiple events of 90 mph (140 km/h) wind gusts. The sequence as a whole killed five people and injured three more.

The sequence began as a line of supercells and evolved into a powerful mesoscale convective system over Montana late on July 13, which raced southeasterly into North Dakota, South Dakota, and Nebraska while producing widespread wind gusts of over 60 mph (97 km/h) and as high as 108 mph (174 km/h) into the overnight hours of July 14. Further east in Illinois and Indiana, a system on the morning of July 14 brought rainfall up to 6.3 in (16 cm) to Rockford, Illinois, which caused flash flood conditions, as well as scattered wind gusts of 60 mph (97 km/h). Later that evening, a separate system, the remnants of the previous day's derecho and fueled by the same Ring of Fire pattern, produced a small-scale tornado outbreak and damaging wind event across the Chicago metropolitan area, with two tornadoes confirmed in the city of Chicago itself, and wind gusts reaching 90 mph (140 km/h). An additional 2.7 in (6.9 cm) of rain fell in Rockford, contributing to flooding conditions.

The most destructive event of the sequence was a severe derecho that affected much of eastern Iowa, northern Illinois, and northwest Indiana on July 15 and 16. Extreme atmospheric instability contributed to a powerful bowing mesoscale convective system that brought widespread downburst wind gusts of over 75 mph (121 km/h) and peaking at 105 mph (169 km/h) near Camp Grove, Illinois. Heavy rains in central Illinois led to the evacuation of parts of Nashville, due to the imminent failure of the Nashville City Reservoir Dam on July 16. This derecho produced a tornado outbreak that spawned numerous tornadoes across its path, some of which hit the cities of Des Moines and Davenport in Iowa, and Aurora, Naperville, and Joliet in Illinois, with an extremely rare tornado causing minor damage in downtown Chicago. Two significant tornadoes were confirmed, both in Illinois; an EF2 tornado in Jo Daviess and Stephenson counties, and another EF2 tornado in Will and southern Cook counties. Comparisons have been drawn between this and the August 2020 Midwest derecho, which affected many of the same areas.

Starting on the afternoon of July 15 and extending through the 16, fourteen tornadoes were confirmed across New York state and New Hampshire. The strongest of these was a high-end EF2 tornado in Rome, New York, on July 16. Another EF1 tornado produced one fatality in Canastota, New York.

== Meteorological synopsis ==
=== July 13 ===
On the evening of July 13, a multitude of shortwave troughs were tracking southeastward across Saskatchewan, towards an area of east-southeasterly low-level winds, which, alongside favorable wind shear and daytime heating contributing to atmospheric instability, led the Storm Prediction Center to issue a wind-driven enhanced (3/5) risk over Montana, North Dakota, and South Dakota at the 20Z convective outlook. Models showed supercells and bowing mesoscale features across the risk area. As the day progressed, a line of supercell thunderstorms evolved into a mesoscale convective system and began to produce significant downburst winds across the risk area. The highest recorded wind gust was 108 mph (174 km/h) near Hoover, South Dakota. After the system passed, it was declared a derecho by the Storm Prediction Center.

At the same time, a mesoscale convective system over Minnesota and Wisconsin posed a light severe threat, while the system moved southeastward into northern Illinois that evening.

=== July 14 ===
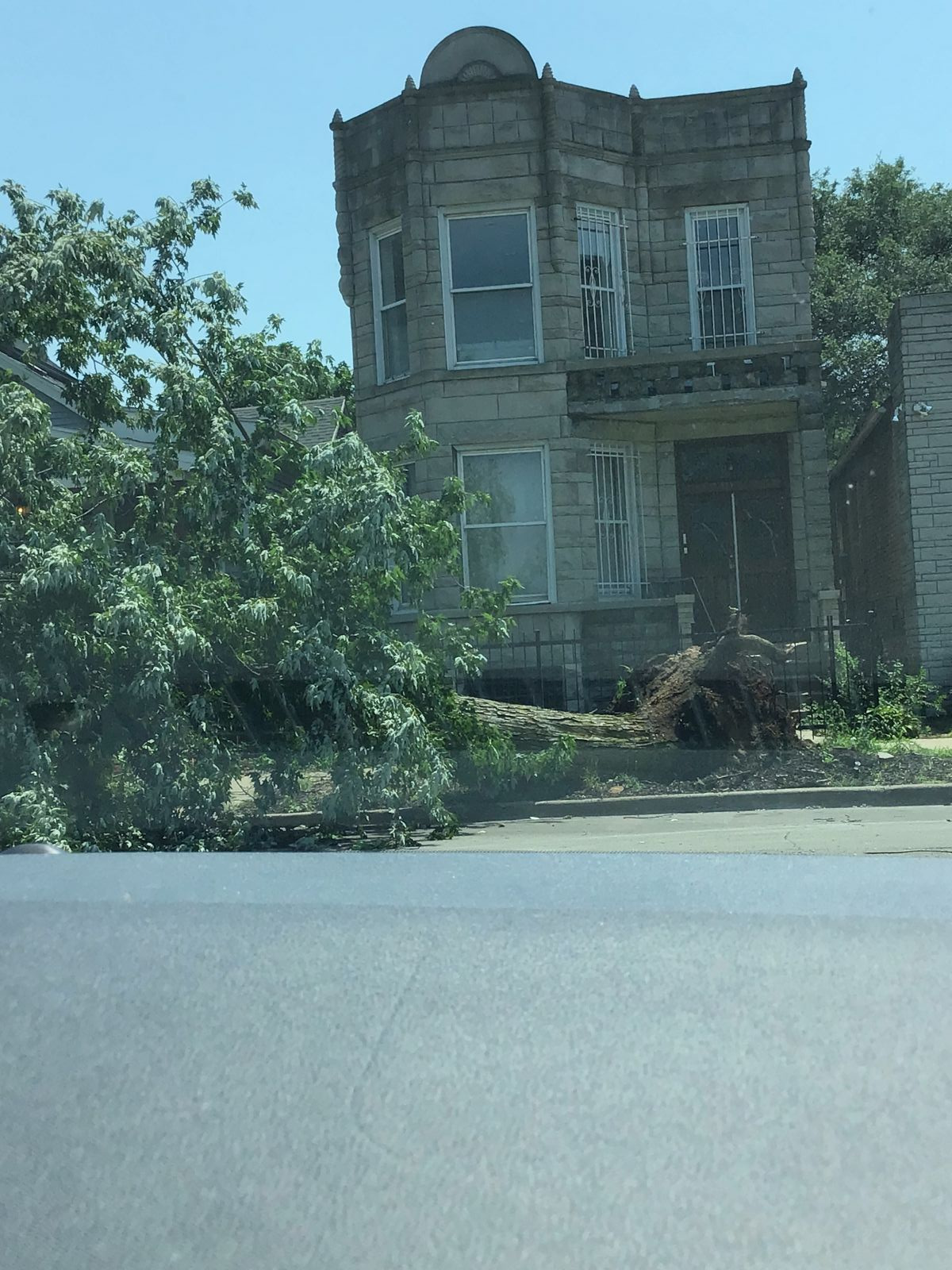
A tree uprooted by a weak tornado in Chicago on July 14.

The Storm Prediction Center outlined a slight (2/5) risk convective outlook at 13Z, outflow from previous mesoscale convective systems had manifested as outflow boundaries over Iowa and Illinois, which were expected to be conducive to the formation of serial mesoscale convective systems that evening. As the evening progressed, the remnants of the July 13 derecho reached Iowa, and threatened to re-intensify into a semi-discrete line of thunderstorms. The uncertainty of the timing of such development caused uncertainty among forecasters, however the severe threat over the Northern Illinois region was noted in a mesoscale discussion around that time. Fueled by the westward migration of a high-pressure ridge over the Four Corners region in a ring of fire pattern, six tornadoes were confirmed from the NWS Chicago area of responsibility. In addition, an area of strong downburst winds caused non-tornadic gusts estimated at 90 mph (140 km/h) in DeKalb, Kane, and DuPage counties. Rainfall totals exceeding 2 in (5.1 cm) were recorded in Naperville and Aurora, with a peak total of 2.8 in (7.1 cm) recorded near Earlville, Illinois.

=== July 15 ===
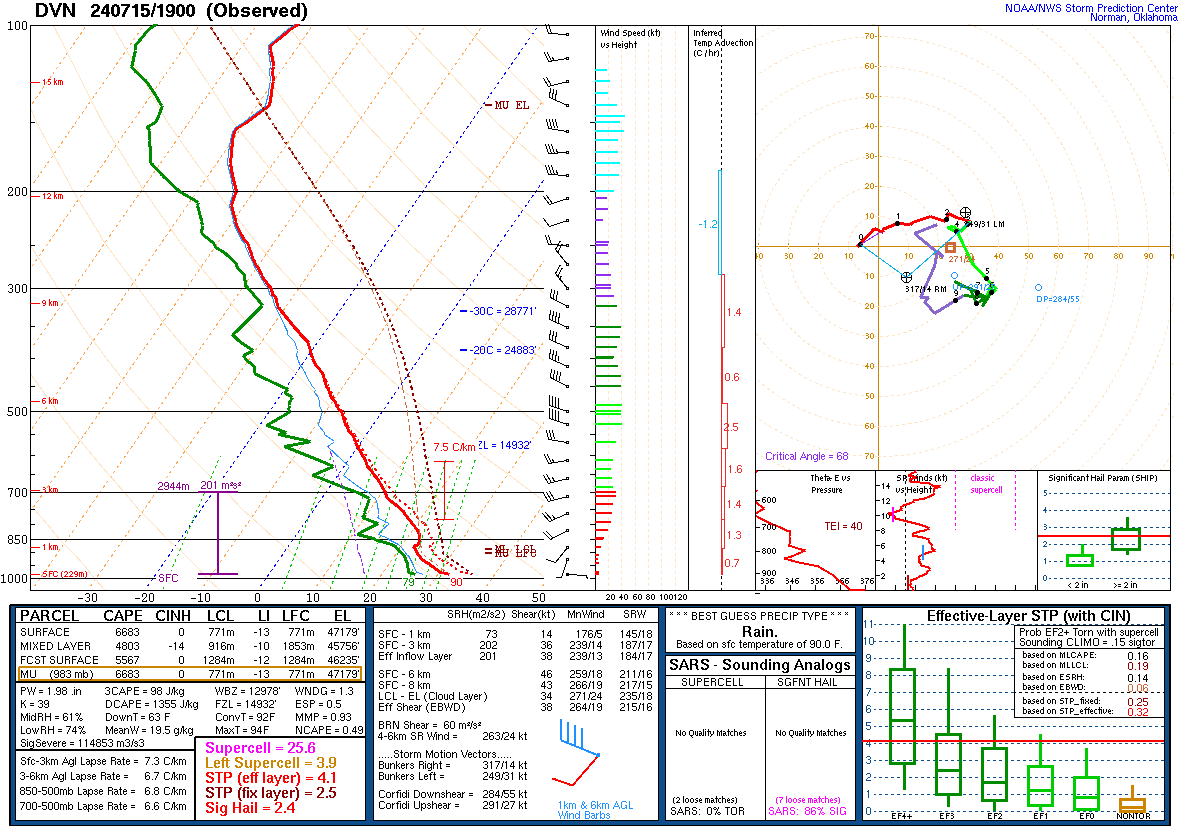
Observed sounding at 19z from Davenport, Iowa

The Storm Prediction Center outlined a moderate risk convective outlook at 20z, as extreme atmospheric instability and favorable vertical wind shear was predicted to be favorable to the formation of a bowing mesoscale convective system. Initial estimates stated that widespread wind gusts up to 60–75 mph (97–121 km/h) would be likely, as well as occasional gusts up to 85 mph (137 km/h).

Before the system developed, a mesoscale discussion was issued, which described the convective setting over Iowa, Wisconsin, and Illinois. A short-wave trough was recorded moving into an area favorable for the development of a mesoscale convective system and brief tornadoes. Concerns over the predictability of the incoming system prompted a rare 19z sounding from National Weather Service Quad Cities, Iowa/Illinois, near Davenport, Iowa. The returning sounding indicated extreme atmospheric instability values over 6500 J/kg, as well as a favorable vertical shear profile, indicating atmospheric favorability for a strong quasi-linear convective system, potentially with embedded tornadoes.

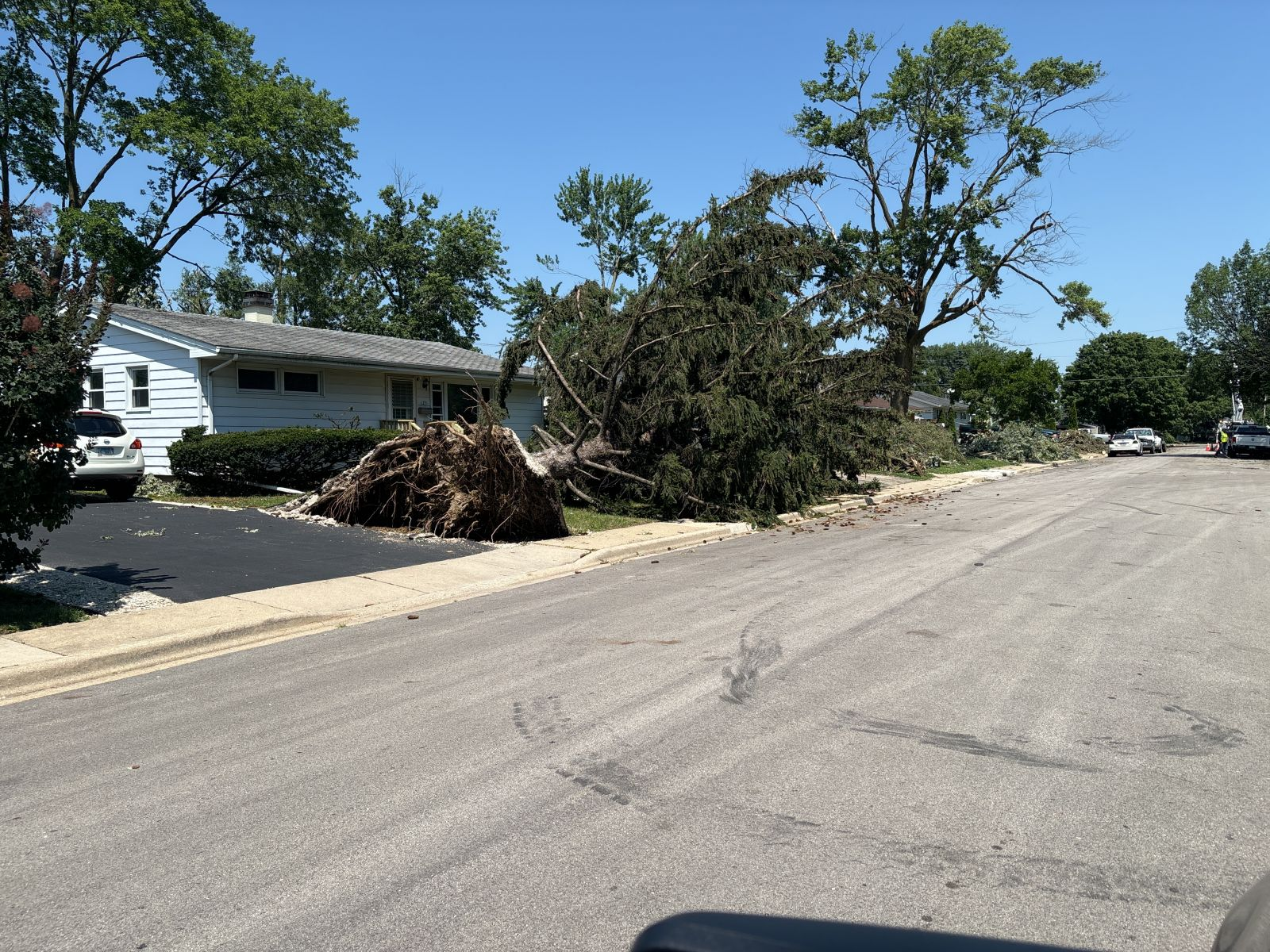
A large tree uprooted by a tornado in Joliet, Illinois on July 15, 2024.

Shortly after this sounding, a severe thunderstorm watch was issued, as forecasters predicted a fast-moving bowing storm system could form and bring wind gusts exceeding 85 mph (137 km/h) to northern Illinois, eastern Iowa, and southern Wisconsin. As the system moved eastward, strong wind gusts exceeding 80 mph (130 km/h) were recorded along the line, and a tornado watch was issued in portions of Iowa, Illinois, Wisconsin, Indiana, and Michigan as forecasters noticed the risk of embedded mesocyclones and wind gusts up to 90 mph (140 km/h) in the now-bowing system. As the system moved east, it began spawning numerous tornadoes across northern Illinois, including numerous in the Chicago metropolitan area, as wind gusts measured 105 mph (169 km/h) near Camp Grove, Illinois, and numerous trees were downed. The office of the National Weather Service in Romeoville, Illinois, was threatened by a tornado, prompting employees to take shelter, and forecasting and warning operations of the National Weather Service Chicago office moved to the office in Gaylord, Michigan.

In all, a record of 32 tornadoes were confirmed in the county warning area of National Weather Service Chicago, a record previously held by the July 2014 derecho sequence and the Tornado outbreak of March 31 – April 1, 2023. One fatality was confirmed in Cedar Lake, Indiana. Many of the affected areas were previously impacted by the August 2020 Midwest derecho.

In the state of New York, a downburst with winds up to 95 mph (153 km/h) and an accompanying EF1 tornado affected the city of Canandaigua.

=== July 16 ===
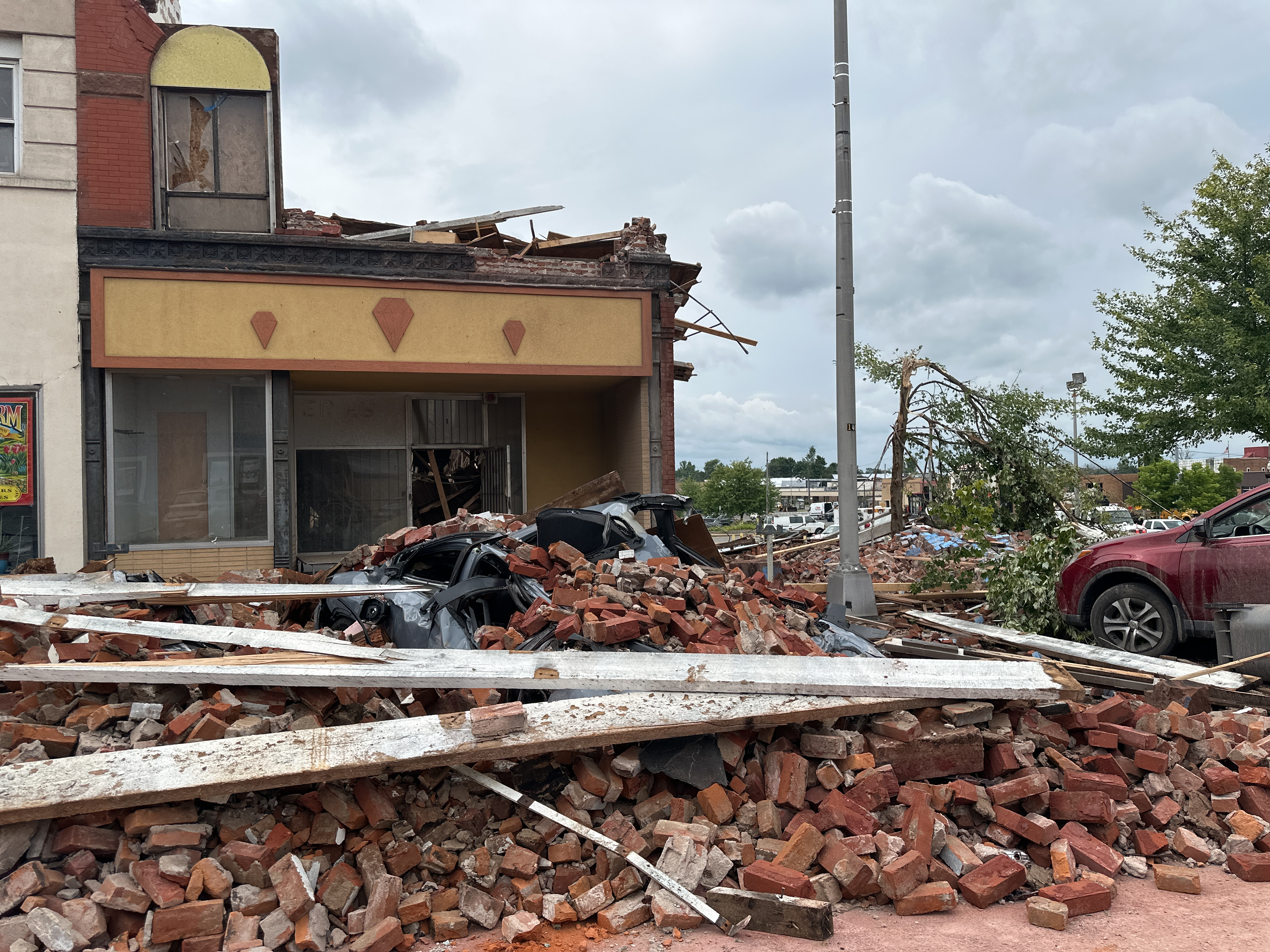
High-end EF2 damage to a business in Rome, New York on July 16, 2024

The Storm Prediction Center issued an enhanced risk (3/5) convective outlook over areas of New York and Vermont as the remnants of the previous day's derecho, now a weakening mesoscale convective system, would interact with the region's MLCAPE values nearing 1500 J/kg and mid-level winds, which would favor a severe wind event with lesser tornadic potential. An EF2 tornado near Rome, New York, caused damage to a church and moved a B-52 Stratofortress from its position. At least 10 tornadoes were confirmed.

Together with the outbreak spawned by the remnants of Hurricane Beryl, the 2024 tornado season in New York broke the record for most July tornadoes.

== Confirmed tornadoes ==
Confirmed tornadoes by Enhanced Fujita rating
EFU	EF0	EF1	EF2	EF3	EF4	EF5	Total
11	40	40	3	0	0	0	94

=== July 13 event ===
List of confirmed tornadoes – Saturday, July 13, 2024 (Note: All dates are based on the local time zone where the tornado touched down; however, all times are in Coordinated Universal Time for consistency.)
EF#	Location	County / Parish	State	Start Coord.	Time (UTC)	Path length	Max width
EFU	NW of Moland	Rice	MN	44.2627°N 93.1389°W	21:59–22:04	0.5 mi (0.80 km)	20 yd (18 m)
EFU	A storm chaser witnessed a brief tornado.						
EF1	SW of Colfax to NNW of Barney	Richland	ND	46.42°N 97.05°W	00:15–00:45	4.5 mi (7.2 km)	80 yd (73 m)
EF1	This long-lived multi-vortex high-end EF1 tornado moved over rural open terrain, snapping a few trees.						

=== July 14 event ===
List of confirmed tornadoes – Sunday, July 14, 2024
EF#	Location	County / Parish	State	Start Coord.	Time (UTC)	Path length	Max width
EF0	S of Esmond	Ogle, DeKalb	IL	42.0304°N 88.95°W	01:58–02:02	3.04 mi (4.89 km)	100 yd (91 m)
EF0	An outbuilding was destroyed and crops and trees were damaged.						
EF1	SSW of Virgil to Elburn to W of Geneva	Kane	IL	41.9191°N 88.5396°W	02:28–02:40	9 mi (14 km)	150 yd (140 m)
EF1	This tornado initially started by causing crop damage visible in satellite imagery. It moved southeast and then east through Elburn, downing trees and damaging several farm buildings and houses. As the tornado turned east-northeast, it reached peak intensity by destroying a metal farm building at an equestrian center and driving wooden boards into the ground. Additional tree damage occurred before the tornado ended south of IL 38.						
EF0	Western St. Charles	Kane	IL	41.9041°N 88.3519°W	02:43–02:44	0.8 mi (1.3 km)	200 yd (180 m)
EF0	This brief tornado began just north of IL 38. It moved southeast, damaging the roof of a self-storage building, a greenhouse, and tossing shopping cart corrals at a grocery store. A light pole was knocked down, and several trees were snapped or uprooted before the tornado ended.						
EF0	Northwestern La Grange to Cicero	Cook	IL	41.8151°N 87.8858°W	03:23–03:33	7.4 mi (11.9 km)	250 yd (230 m)
EF0	A weak tornado tracked through the western suburbs of Chicago, including La Grange, Brookfield, Riverside, Berwyn and Cicero. Damage was entirely confined to trees.						
EF0	Southern Chicago (1st tornado)	Cook	IL	41.79°N 87.7425°W	03:33–03:43	8 mi (13 km)	300 yd (270 m)
EF0	This high-end EF0 tornado touched down just east of Midway International Airport, moving through the South Side neighborhoods of West Elsdon, Gage Park, New City and Fuller Park. The damage in these neighborhoods was primarily limited to trees, but some minor roof damage occurred to homes. The tornado then crossed I-90 into the Grand Boulevard and Kenwood neighborhoods, producing more tree damage before moving offshore onto Lake Michigan.						
EF0	Southern Chicago (2nd tornado)	Cook	IL	41.768°N 87.634°W	03:40–03:44	3.6 mi (5.8 km)	200 yd (180 m)
EF0	A weak tornado began near Englewood STEM High School in the neighborhood of Englewood. The tornado moved east, going through Greater Grand Crossing and Woodlawn. Damage around here included a train car being knocked over and some minor roof damage. The tornado entered Jackson Park, damaging trees before moving offshore and becoming a waterspout on Lake Michigan.						
EFU	ENE of Lone Tree Corners to NNE of Henry	Bureau, Putnam	IL	41.19°N 89.47°W	04:33–04:43	10.9 mi (17.5 km)	190 yd (170 m)
EFU	High-resolution satellite imagery showed a well-defined path of downed crops. No other damage occurred.						
EF1	N of Henry	Marshall	IL	41.1254°N 89.3572°W	04:40–04:42	0.45 mi (0.72 km)	50 yd (46 m)
EF1	A mobile home park was struck by a tornado where mainly tree damage was noted. Some trailers were heavily damaged.						
EFU	E of Walnut Grove to S of McNabb	Putnam	IL	41.18°N 89.32°W	04:41–04:48	8.1 mi (13.0 km)	450 yd (410 m)
EFU	A tornado touched down on the eastern bank of the Illinois River, uprooting a few trees. The tornado then moved through farmland, flattening crops and uprooting occasional trees before lifting.						
EFU	NE of Henry to SE of Magnolia	Putnam, Marshall	IL	41.14°N 89.33°W	04:41–04:53	12.8 mi (20.6 km)	620 yd (570 m)
EFU	This tornado initially flattened crops before uprooting dozens of trees in a wooded area. The tornado continued damaging farmland before eventually dissipating.						
EF1	SSE of Henry to N of Varna	Marshall	IL	41.0915°N 89.3481°W	04:42–04:45	6.28 mi (10.11 km)	100 yd (91 m)
EF1	A tornado began just east of the Illinois River and tracked southeast, causing extensive tree damage.						
EFU	ENE of Varna	Marshall	IL	41.05°N 89.19°W	04:48–04:49	0.87 mi (1.40 km)	60 yd (55 m)
EFU	Sentinel satellite imagery showed a tornado tracked across farm fields, only damaging crops.						
EFU	ENE of Varna	Marshall	IL	41.05°N 89.18°W	04:48–04:49	0.87 mi (1.40 km)	60 yd (55 m)
EFU	A second tornado formed that tracked only across farm fields. This tornado paralleled the previous tornado. No damage occurred.						

=== July 15 event ===
List of confirmed tornadoes – Monday, July 15, 2024
EF#	Location	County / Parish	State	Start Coord.	Time (UTC)	Path length	Max width
EFU	ESE of Wenona to N of Long Point	LaSalle, Livingston	IL	41.0292°N 88.9718°W	05:02–05:06	4.2 mi (6.8 km)	150 yd (140 m)
EFU	A tornado was discovered from high-resolution satellite imagery, which showed a swath of damage in crops in farm fields. No other damage occurred.						
EFU	NNW of Dana to S of Long Point	LaSalle, Livingston	IL	40.9943°N 88.9686°W	05:03–05:07	3.9 mi (6.3 km)	100 yd (91 m)
EFU	A tornado was discovered from high-resolution satellite imagery, which showed a swath of damage in crops in farm fields. No other damage occurred.						
EFU	NNE of Long Point	Livingston	IL	41.0307°N 88.8916°W	05:06–05:08	1.9 mi (3.1 km)	225 yd (206 m)
EFU	This brief tornado formed after the 0502 UTC tornado, damaging crops before lifting.						
EF1	ESE of Lacon	Marshall	IL	40.9971°N 89.3629°W	05:10–05:11	0.71 mi (1.14 km)	50 yd (46 m)
EF1	A row of large pine trees was snapped and an outbuilding was damaged.						
EF0	NE of Gluek to W of Raymond	Chippewa	MN	45.0372°N 95.3875°W	12:14–12:17	2.24 mi (3.60 km)	25 yd (23 m)
EF0	About two dozen trees were downed or snapped.						
EF0	Pavilion	Genesee	NY	42.876°N 78.03°W	19:50–19:52	0.75 mi (1.21 km)	75 yd (69 m)
EF0	A narrow path of tree damage occurred.						
EF0	Southeastern Canandaigua	Ontario	NY	42.8781°N 77.2706°W	20:48–20:50	0.75 mi (1.21 km)	75 yd (69 m)
EF0	This EF0 tornado damaged a strip mall, utility poles, and trees on the north shore of Canandaigua Lake.						
EF0	Virgil	Cortland	NY	42.485°N 76.230°W	22:25–22:37	7.5 mi (12.1 km)	175 yd (160 m)
EF0	A few homes sustained minor roof damage and trees were damaged as well.						
EF1	Urbandale to Western Des Moines	Polk	IA	41.6442°N 93.7606°W	22:37–22:47	6.88 mi (11.07 km)	300 yd (270 m)
EF1	This tornado developed near I-35 and moved southeast through or near Urbandale, Windsor Heights, and Des Moines. Extensive tree damage was noted along with damage to homes and power lines.						
EF1	SE of Lincklaen to Otselic	Chenango	NY	42.6549°N 75.8374°W	22:54–23:02	8.69 mi (13.99 km)	250 yd (230 m)
EF1	A high-end EF1 tornado uprooted and snapped hundreds of trees. A barn was partially collapsed, with its roof displaced. Some other structures had minor roofing or window damage. A carport was also lofted.						
EF1	Kieler	Grant	WI	42.5858°N 90.5963°W	23:14–23:15	0.29 mi (0.47 km)	30 yd (27 m)
EF1	This brief tornado damaged the roofs of two structures, an outbuilding, and trees.						
EF0	W of Hale	Jones	IA	42.0237°N 91.0839°W	23:18–23:21	1.51 mi (2.43 km)	50 yd (46 m)
EF0	This high-end EF0 tornado flattened corn in a field before inflicting roof damage to a house at a farmstead. A metal structure was also collapsed onto the house. The tornado continued damaging trees south of the farmstead before lifting just across the Wapsipinicon River.						
EF1	NE of Hanover to Shannon	Jo Daviess, Carroll	IL	42.2932°N 90.262°W	23:40–00:16	29.81 mi (47.97 km)	100 yd (91 m)
EF1	A roof was significantly damaged in Jo Daviess County. The tornado moved through the Lake Carroll area, damaging a garage, gazebo and a boat dock. Numerous trees were also downed in the area. The tornado then tracked through Shannon, downing more trees, before lifting shortly after exiting town.						
EF1	ESE of Woodbine to NW of Willow	Jo Daviess	IL	42.3402°N 90.132°W	23:48–23:58	8.07 mi (12.99 km)	50 yd (46 m)
EF1	This intermittent tornado downed several trees.						
EF2	SW of Millville to ENE of Lena	Jo Daviess, Stephenson	IL	42.4124°N 90.0959°W	23:50–00:09	15.41 mi (24.80 km)	150 yd (140 m)
EF2	An intermittent, low-end EF2 tornado snapped a wooden power pole near its base, snapped trees and impacted a farmstead, damaging an outbuilding and grain elevator.						
EF0	S of Fairport, IA	Muscatine (IA), Rock Island (IL)	IA, IL	41.432°N 90.9313°W	00:02–00:05	3.05 mi (4.91 km)	50 yd (46 m)
EF0	This tornado started on the Mississippi River as a waterspout before landfalling in Illinois where it uprooted trees and snapped large branches.						
EF1	ENE of Edgington to S of Lynn Center	Rock Island, Mercer, Henry	IL	41.3998°N 90.7252°W	00:17–00:45	24.69 mi (39.73 km)	100 yd (91 m)
EF1	Two large grain elevator bins were dented, several outbuildings were damaged, and a few utility poles were snapped. Dozens of trees were downed, snapped, and uprooted.						
EF1	Northern Davenport, IA to Bettendorf, IA to East Moline, IL	Scott (IA), Rock Island (IL)	IA, IL	41.5569°N 90.5776°W	00:19–00:32	7.95 mi (12.79 km)	100 yd (91 m)
EF1	Dozens of large trees were snapped, with some falling on homes and at least one on a car. A large section of an apartment's roof was torn off. The tornado dissipated after crossing the Mississippi River into Illinois.						
EF0	SW of Evansville	Rock	WI	42.753°N 89.345°W	00:26–00:28	1.22 mi (1.96 km)	50 yd (46 m)
EF0	This tornado was recorded by a resident, and two storm chasers documented tree damage.						
EFU	SW of Dakota	Stephenson	IL	42.3682°N 89.5776°W	00:26–00:27	1.01 mi (1.63 km)	10 yd (9.1 m)
EFU	A storm spotter recorded this short-lived tornado that caused no damage.						
EF0	Byron	Ogle	IL	42.1432°N 89.3159°W	00:44–00:51	5.3 mi (8.5 km)	200 yd (180 m)
EF0	This weak tornado moved due east directly through Byron along IL 2/IL 72, damaging trees, crops and blowing the roof off a car wash.						
EF0	Davis Junction	Ogle	IL	42.1032°N 89.1214°W	00:58–01:00	1.7 mi (2.7 km)	200 yd (180 m)
EF0	Tree damage occurred on the north side of Davis Junction north of IL 72.						
EF0	SSE of Winnebago	Winnebago	IL	42.217°N 89.2027°W	00:58–01:00	1.2 mi (1.9 km)	100 yd (91 m)
EF0	Corn crops, trees, and power lines were damaged.						
EF0	WSW of New Milford	Winnebago	IL	42.1687°N 89.092°W	01:01–01:02	0.2 mi (0.32 km)	25 yd (23 m)
EF0	A narrow corridor of weak tree damage occurred.						
EF1	Southern Kewanee	Henry	IL	41.228°N 89.991°W	01:02–01:09	5.24 mi (8.43 km)	200 yd (180 m)
EF1	This deviant tornado in Kewanee downed over one hundred trees in the city, with numerous trees being snapped or uprooted and some falling on homes. Many homesteads had minor roof damage, while a couple had large sections of their roof removed.						
EF0	Monroe Center	Ogle	IL	42.1018°N 89.0234°W	01:05–01:08	2.2 mi (3.5 km)	150 yd (140 m)
EF0	Vehicles were flipped on IL 72. Entering Monroe Center, some trees were uprooted in the town. Exiting town, some crop damage was observed from satellite imagery before the tornado dissipated.						
EF1	Northern Kewanee	Henry	IL	41.2569°N 89.9489°W	01:07–01:10	1.7 mi (2.7 km)	50 yd (46 m)
EF1	A couple of businesses and a storage building had their roofs damaged. Several trees were damaged as well.						
EF1	N of Williamsfield	Knox	IL	40.9578°N 90.0205°W	01:07–01:08	1.25 mi (2.01 km)	150 yd (140 m)
EF1	This brief tornado significantly damaged trees.						
EF0	S of Princeville	Peoria	IL	40.9244°N 89.8936°W	01:15–01:19	4.35 mi (7.00 km)	80 yd (73 m)
EF0	This tornado began in Monica, where a couple of roofs and trees were damaged. The tornado moved southeast toward Princeville, damaging several large trees before dissipating.						
EF1	W of Dunlap	Peoria	IL	40.8595°N 89.7579°W	01:21–01:23	2.4 mi (3.9 km)	150 yd (140 m)
EF1	Many properties were struck and had trees extensively damaged at each one. One property lost forty tees. The tornado also downed a tree onto a powerline.						
EF0	S of Dunlap to Alta	Peoria	IL	40.825°N 89.684°W	01:22–01:25	2.54 mi (4.09 km)	100 yd (91 m)
EF0	Trees and homes were damaged in a few neighborhoods.						
EF1	SW of Germantown Hills	Woodford	IL	40.7597°N 89.4892°W	01:36–01:37	0.38 mi (0.61 km)	100 yd (91 m)
EF1	Several trees were damaged.						
EF0	WSW of Cazenovia	Woodford	IL	40.8433°N 89.3761°W	01:38–01:39	1.37 mi (2.20 km)	80 yd (73 m)
EF0	Three properties had tree damage occur. Corn fields were also damaged.						
EFU	N of Maple Park	DeKalb, Kane	IL	41.9101°N 88.6181°W	01:38–01:41	1.8 mi (2.9 km)	50 yd (46 m)
EFU	A brief tornado debris signature appeared on radar, and crop damage occurred.						
EF1	Morton to NE of Mackinaw	Tazewell	IL	40.6451°N 89.5198°W	01:39–01:54	12.2 mi (19.6 km)	100 yd (91 m)
EF1	This tornado began just outside of East Peoria before quickly moving into northern Morton. The tornado followed I-74 into an industrial complex, causing damage there. The tornado continued moving southeast, uprooting trees around Morton High School. Outside of Morton, more damage was documented at an American Legion building where siding was ripped off. The tornado then lifted shortly after.						
EF1	SE of Germantown Hills	Woodford, Tazewell	IL	40.7531°N 89.4477°W	01:40–01:41	1.23 mi (1.98 km)	100 yd (91 m)
EF1	This tornado began in a wooded subdivision, damaging multiple trees. The tornado then entered a newer subdivision, damaging many more trees. One home had a small part of its roof and siding torn off. A window was also blown out at this home. The tornado then continued southeastward, damaging multiple old trees on a property, including two trees that were uprooted, before lifting.						
EF1	Big Rock to Sugar Grove to Western Aurora	Kane	IL	41.756°N 88.5173°W	01:49–02:00	8.4 mi (13.5 km)	300 yd (270 m)
EF1	A tornado with peak winds of 95 mph touched down near the entrance of Big Rock Campground and tracked east-northeast. In Sugar Grove, just south of US 30, it caused minor roof damage to several homes and snapped or uprooted numerous healthy trees. The Sugar Grove Fire Department sustained minor structural damage, likely from airborne debris, and a 200 lb (91 kg) training roof section was shifted. The tornado crossed IL 56 twice, producing additional minor structural and tree damage as it moved into the west side of Aurora. It continued northeast where it caused more tree damage, downed fences, and sporadic damage to shingles and fascia before dissipating within the city.						
EFU	SSW of Deer Creek	Tazewell	IL	40.6004°N 89.3452°W	01:51–01:52	0.87 mi (1.40 km)	80 yd (73 m)
EFU	Sentinel satellite imagery revealed a tornado that tracked southeastward through a cornfield. No damage occurred except for corn crops.						
EF0	Northern Sugar Grove to North Aurora	Kane	IL	41.7895°N 88.4774°W	01:52–02:05	10.1 mi (16.3 km)	250 yd (230 m)
EF0	This high-end EF0 tornado began just north of the Aurora Municipal Airport and moved northeast, crossing IL 47 and passing through the Waubonsee Community College campus, where it snapped and downed numerous trees and limbs. It continued into a subdivision south of I-88, causing minor roof damage to homes, uprooting and snapping trees, and damaging utility poles. The tornado crossed I-88, producing additional tree damage and minor fascia damage to nearby homes. Fallen limbs also caused damage to houses and vehicles, and power lines were downed. The tornado crossed the Fox River and produced more sporadic tree damage before dissipating just north of I-88.						
EF0	ESE of Minonk to WNW of Flanagan	Woodford, Livingston	IL	40.8834°N 88.996°W	01:55–02:00	3.78 mi (6.08 km)	30 yd (27 m)
EF0	A high-end EF0 mainly damaged trees and crops during its life, but a single power pole was also damaged.						
EF1	Northern Yorkville to Oswego to Southern Naperville	Kendall, Will	IL	41.6848°N 88.4695°W	01:55–02:18	19.2 mi (30.9 km)	200 yd (180 m)
EF1	This tornado touched down on the north side of Yorkville and moved east through Bristol, producing tree damage. It then moved into Oswego, where widespread tree damage occurred near IL 71. Numerous large trees were uprooted or snapped, with some falling onto houses and others taking down utility poles and power lines. Roof damage to several homes was noted just east of the Fox River, likely where the tornado reached its peak intensity. The tornado continued east-northeast, crossing into Will County just west of US 30. It proceeded to cause more tree damage along its path and crossed IL 59, where additional limbs were blown down. The tornado eventually dissipated after continuing eastward through residential areas.						
EF1	E of Lisbon to Southern Shorewood to Joliet	Kendall, Will	IL	41.465°N 88.4033°W	02:05–02:26	19.5 mi (31.4 km)	250 yd (230 m)
EF1	This high-end EF1 tornado produced sporadic tree damage in Kendall County. Upon entering Will County, it caused damage to numerous trees and outbuildings. In Shorewood, it snapped trees and crossed the Fox River, where it caused a partial roof collapse to a home, injuring two people inside. The tornado crossed I-55 and snapped trees in a forest preserve south of the Joliet Regional Airport, with additional damage to trees and corn crops in a nearby subdivision. The tornado continued across the Inwood Golf Course, where over one hundred trees were damaged, some as old as seventy years. It then crossed US 52, causing significant damage to trees, power lines, utility poles, and roofs—including a church just north of the route. This area likely experienced the tornado at peak strength. The tornado continued northeast, crossed the Des Plaines River, and then weakened, producing only sporadic tree damage before dissipating near US 6.						
EF2	Southern Channahon to Southern Frankfort to Matteson	Grundy, Will, Cook	IL	41.3876°N 88.3755°W	02:09–02:41	34.6 mi (55.7 km)	325 yd (297 m)
EF2	This strong, long-track tornado touched down in Grundy County initially producing sporadic tree and utility pole damage. As it neared the Illinois River and crossed into Will County, causing minor roof damage to homes. The tornado intensified and reached peak strength as it crossed I-55, where two metal trusses collapsed, bringing down high tension power lines onto the interstate. Two semi trucks crashed into the fallen lines, and five other vehicles were trapped. Two people were injured, and one person remained stuck in their vehicle for hours. Just west of the interstate, parked semi trucks were overturned, a pickup and van were flipped, and an office building sustained major roof damage. Farther northeast, significant tree and utility pole damage continued, along with roof damage to several homes and farm storage buildings. The tornado crossed IL 53, causing widespread tree damage, including trees falling onto homes and vehicles. It continued east, producing further roof damage as it crossed US 52 and later US 45. More tree damage was observed near a golf course. The tornado then entered Cook County and weakened slightly, though it still caused tree damage as it crossed US 30 and finally Interstate 57 in Illinois before dissipating.						
EF0	Northwestern Joliet to Northern Crest Hill to Lockport	Kendall, Will	IL	41.5586°N 88.3015°W	02:10–02:30	17 mi (27 km)	300 yd (270 m)
EF0	A tornado initially caused damage to trees, fences, and roofs in a residential area. It snapped a tall tree and damaged the roof of Plainfield South High School before crossing into Will County. The tornado produced sporadic tree damage and then crossed IL 59 and caused significant tree damage in a neighborhood. As it continued east, crossed I-55, and moved over the Louis Joliet Mall area, causing roof and fascia damage to a nearby church near US 30. The tornado jogged northeast and passed through another residential area, causing minor roof and tree damage before crossing IL 53 and the Des Plaines River. As it moved across Lockport, tree limbs and fences were downed. The tornado continued east, snapping trees and blowing down fences before crossing I-355 and ending shortly after.						
EF0	Eastern Glen Ellyn to Lombard	DuPage	IL	41.8675°N 88.0533°W	02:23–02:27	3.1 mi (5.0 km)	150 yd (140 m)
EF0	This high-end EF0 tornado touched down and moved northeast, producing a corridor of concentrated tree damage. Several large, healthy trees were snapped or had limbs removed. One house sustained minor stucco damage, and additional minor roof and fascia damage occurred to several homes. A house also lost part of its roof. After crossing I-355, the tornado caused more significant tree damage near residential areas and an elementary school. Damage became more sparse as the tornado weakened and eventually dissipated.						
EF0	Villa Park	DuPage	IL	41.8867°N 87.9777°W	02:29–02:30	0.8 mi (1.3 km)	50 yd (46 m)
EF0	This brief tornado produced a local corridor of tree damage, mainly in the form of downed branches. Power line damage also occurred.						
EF0	Mokena	Will	IL	41.5278°N 87.8985°W	02:33–02:36	2.9 mi (4.7 km)	300 yd (270 m)
EF0	A high-end EF0 tornado touched down near the west side of Mokena and tracked northeast through the downtown area, roughly following the railroad tracks. Along its path, numerous trees and limbs were downed, fences were blown over, and several buildings sustained minor roof damage. Utility poles and power lines were also damaged. The tornado crossed US 45 before dissipating.						
EF0	Eastern Bensenville to Western Rosemont	DuPage, Cook	IL	41.9546°N 87.938°W	02:34–02:42	4.1 mi (6.6 km)	250 yd (230 m)
EF0	This tornado touched down just southwest of O’Hare International Airport, damaging trees before moving east-northeast across the airport. On the airport's property, it caused damage to windows, doors, exterior paneling, and roofing on multiple terminals and gates. Carts and other loose objects were displaced or thrown. The tornado continued east near I-190, where additional tree damage occurred, and it dissipated just west of I-294.						
EF0	NW of Bourbonnais to Southern Manteno to Whitaker	Kankakee	IL	41.2252°N 87.9257°W	02:35–02:45	12.3 mi (19.8 km)	275 yd (251 m)
EF0	This tornado began in a field and caused tree damage shortly after forming. It moved east, crossing US 45 where it blew down a utility pole, then crossed I-57 and caused extensive tree damage in southern Manteno. Several homes in the area sustained minor roof and fascia damage, and multiple fences were damaged. As the tornado continued east, it damaged the siding and skirting of several modular homes and tore roofing material from two distribution warehouse buildings. It went on to damage trees, power lines, and farm outbuildings before dissipating in a field just west of Tower Creek.						
EF0	Broadview	Cook	IL	41.8641°N 87.8692°W	02:36–02:38	1.2 mi (1.9 km)	175 yd (160 m)
EF0	A high-end EF0 tornado touched down and moved east-northeast, initially damaging a warehouse where roof, siding, and windows were impacted. It continued on to peel portions of the roofs from three apartment buildings, depositing debris nearby. A garage also partially collapsed. Afterward, the tornado caused only tree damage before dissipating.						
EF1	Justice to Bridgeview	Cook	IL	41.7513°N 87.8573°W	02:37–02:40	2.1 mi (3.4 km)	75 yd (69 m)
EF1	A low-end EF1 tornado touched down near the Chicago Sanitary and Ship Canal, just north of I-294. It moved through a mobile home park, damaging trees and homes. Several large, healthy trees were uprooted or snapped, and minor shingle, siding, and fascia damage was observed. A greenhouse was blown roughly 75 feet (23 m). It continued through a cemetery, broadened in width, and then dissipated east of IL 43.						
EF0	S of Peotone to WSW of Beecher	Will	IL	41.3082°N 87.7869°W	02:41–02:46	6.4 mi (10.3 km)	100 yd (91 m)
EF0	This tornado initially caused large tree limbs to fall and snapped the tops of about twenty trees. As it moved east, it produced widespread tree damage and caused a collapsed outbuilding and broken windows to two homes. The tornado then shifted northeast, causing significant roof damage to a house and continuing to down trees. Near the end of its path, shingles were torn from a roof and a chicken coop was destroyed before it dissipated.						
EF0	S of Palos Heights to Southern Blue Island	Cook	IL	41.6438°N 87.8004°W	02:41–02:48	5.7 mi (9.2 km)	300 yd (270 m)
EF0	This tornado touched down west of IL 43 and tracked eastward, roughly paralleling a local street. It caused numerous tree limbs to fall along trails in a forest preserve and produced significant tree damage. Minor roof damage and a large uprooted tree were reported near the midpoint of the path. The tornado continued to produce tree damage as it crossed I-294 and eventually dissipated east of the interstate.						
EF0	Oak Forest	Cook	IL	41.6039°N 87.7714°W	02:43–02:44	0.4 mi (0.64 km)	85 yd (78 m)
EF0	A brief caused tree damage and minor roof and fascia damage to several homes. One home also sustained damage to siding, gutters, a vinyl fence, and a broken window. The tornado quickly dissipated after affecting a small residential area.						
EF1	Flossmoor to Homewood to Thornton	Cook	IL	41.5379°N 87.6939°W	02:43–02:49	5.5 mi (8.9 km)	250 yd (230 m)
EF1	This tornado caused extensive tree damage, including large trees snapped and uprooted, as it tracked northeast through residential areas. Several homes sustained minor roof damage and had windows blown out. The Thornton Recreation Center suffered partial roof loss, and power poles were knocked down nearby. A large tree limb also fell onto a house. The tornado ended just south of I-294.						
EF0	Northern Country Club Hills	Cook	IL	41.5825°N 87.7151°W	02:45–02:46	0.4 mi (0.64 km)	125 yd (114 m)
EF0	A brief tornado caused tree damage that brought down power lines and downed a pine tree onto a house.						
EF1	Southern Chicago (1st tornado)	Cook	IL	41.7645°N 87.7104°W	02:47–02:51	3.2 mi (5.1 km)	150 yd (140 m)
EF1	This low-end EF1 tornado touched down on the southwest side of Marquette Park in the Chicago Lawn neighborhood, snapping several willow trees near their bases. It moved northeast through the park and adjacent golf course, producing a concentrated corridor of significant tree damage. As it continued, numerous trees and limbs were downed in residential areas, blocking streets and breaking at least one light pole. The tornado then turned east and entered the West Englewood neighborhood, causing additional tree damage as it crossed William Ogden Park before dissipating just northeast of the area.						
EF1	Chicago (2nd tornado)	Cook	IL	41.8744°N 87.6998°W	02:47–02:53	3.1 mi (5.0 km)	400 yd (370 m)
EF1	A tornado touched down along I-290 in the East Garfield Park neighborhood, damaging trees. The tornado then moved into the Near West Side area and uprooted many trees by Rush Hospital. The most significant damage occurred near the Chicago Police Academy, where several trees were uprooted nearby and minor fascia occurred to the building. Roof damage was also noted on a nearby building. The tornado weakened and dissipated right next to the Presidential Towers, just before crossing the Chicago River into downtown Chicago.						
EF0	Chicago (3rd tornado)	Cook	IL	41.8974°N 87.7035°W	02:50–02:52	1.4 mi (2.3 km)	150 yd (140 m)
EF0	A high-end EF0 tornado tracked through the West Town neighborhood. Along its path, it uprooted and snapped trees, downed limbs, damaged utility poles, and blew out a few windows of homes. Minor roof and siding damage also occurred. A large tree was uprooted and fell onto a car. The tornado ended after causing additional scattered tree and structural damage.						
EF1	ENE of Grant Park	Kankakee	IL	41.2636°N 87.5866°W	02:51–02:53	2.6 mi (4.2 km)	100 yd (91 m)
EF1	This low-end EF1 tornado touched down in a rural field and quickly intensified, peeling a significant portion of roofing material from a food facility building and overturning a semi trailer in a nearby parking lot. It then moved northeast across open fields with minimal impact until reaching a more developed area where numerous trees were damaged and a few homes sustained minor roof and fascia damage. The tornado ended in a field shortly afterward.						
EF1	S of Eagle Lake, IL to Crown Point, IN to Valparaiso, IN	Will (IL), Lake (IN), Porter (IN)	IL, IN	41.3608°N 87.5595°W	02:52–03:20	29.1 mi (46.8 km)	300 yd (270 m)
EF1	This long-track touched down near Eagle Lake. In its early stages, it damaged trees and an outbuilding before crossing into Indiana. After crossing US 41, it produced extensive tree damage, snapped some trees, and caused minor roof and fascia damage to several homes. A metal building lost most of its roof, a chimney was blown off, and a garage partially collapsed. The tornado continued causing tree and power line damage as it moved through Crown Point, south of US 231, and later crossed US 231 again, damaging an industrial building near SR 53. It peeled metal roof panels, blew out garage doors, collapsed a small wall section, and lofted insulation into power lines. After crossing I-65, it produced additional tree damage and entered Porter County, where sporadic tree damage continued until it crossed Route 30. North of US 30 in Valparaiso, the tornado uprooted and snapped many trees, causing significant damage to homes and vehicles. Structural damage occurred when large trees fell on houses. The tornado weakened and ended just west of SR 49.						
EF0	Lowell	Lake	IN	41.2838°N 87.4526°W	02:58–03:00	2.4 mi (3.9 km)	100 yd (91 m)
EF0	A weak tornado caused minor roof and fascia damage to several homes and produced tree damage along its eastward path. The tornado ended just before crossing SR 2 after continuing to down trees in the area.						
EF0	N of Shelby to SSW of Kouts	Lake, Jasper, Porter	IN	41.2153°N 87.348°W	03:02–03:16	16.4 mi (26.4 km)	100 yd (91 m)
EF0	This tornadotouched down in Lake County just southwest of SR 55 and produced tree damage, including a fallen limb that damaged a car. It crossed I-65 and continued northeast, producing sporadic tree damage before crossing the Kankakee River into Jasper County near US 231. The tornado caused tree and crop damage across northern Jasper County, with satellite imagery showing concentrated crop damage before it crossed the Kankakee River again into Porter County. Additional tree damage occurred in Porter County before the tornado ended south of Crooked Creek.						
EF1	S of Waterford	LaPorte	IN	41.6426°N 86.8714°W	03:32–03:38	3.21 mi (5.17 km)	75 yd (69 m)
EF1	A tornado developed and caused widespread tree damage on a private property, where several hundred hardwood and softwood trees were uprooted or snapped. Additional concentrated tree damage occurred farther east, and many homes and outbuildings sustained minor to moderate damage from falling trees. The tornado weakened and ended as it was overtaken by a broader microburst.						

=== July 16 event ===
List of confirmed tornadoes – Tuesday, July 16, 2024
EF#	Location	County / Parish	State	Start Coord.	Time (UTC)	Path length	Max width
EF0	E of Tippecanoe	Marshall	IN	41.1976°N 86.0867°W	04:09–04:11	0.71 mi (1.14 km)	75 yd (69 m)
EF0	This brief tornado snapped and uprooted several trees.						
EF1	Southern Elkhart	Elkhart	IN	41.6651°N 85.9719°W	04:21–04:23	1.19 mi (1.92 km)	250 yd (230 m)
EF1	This tornado snapped numerous trees and tree limbs.						
EF0	W of Holstein	Warren	MO	38.6468°N 91.1996°W	16:34–16:35	0.25 mi (0.40 km)	25 yd (23 m)
EF0	An emergency manager reported damage to vegetation in the area.						
EF0	WSW of House Springs	Jefferson	MO	38.39°N 90.65°W	17:01–17:04	1.96 mi (3.15 km)	25 yd (23 m)
EF0	Concentrated areas of tree damage occurred.						
EF1	Canastota	Madison	NY	43.0771°N 75.7618°W	19:00–19:07	1.42 mi (2.29 km)	100 yd (91 m)
EF1	1 death – This tornado passed through Canastota, partially or completely unroofing homes, damaging or destroying outbuildings, damaging warehouses and other buildings, snapping power poles, and snapping or uprooting trees. An elderly man who was outside his home near the center of town was injured when the tornado lofted him into the soffit of a masonry building next door; he would later die from his injuries. A second person nearby was also lifted into the building but was uninjured.						
EF1	NE of Taberg to SSW of Beartown	Oneida	NY	43.3123°N 75.5808°W	19:19–19:30	6.5 mi (10.5 km)	200 yd (180 m)
EF1	A tornado initially damaged trees before impacting some structures. A mobile home was shifted off its blocks and had much of its roof covering ripped off. Additional roof and garage damage occurred in the area. Two trees fell on a residence and an outbuilding, significantly damaging the roofs of both. The tornado impaled small to medium tree limbs into the ground in a backyard before lifting.						
EF2	Rome	Oneida	NY	43.21°N 75.49°W	18:25–18:35	5.25 mi (8.45 km)	300 yd (270 m)
EF2	This significant, high-end EF2 tornado began near the Erie Canal and tracked northeast through Rome. In Rome, two churches sustained significant damage to their steeples and roofs, with complete collapses of some walls. Bricks falling from the churches and other buildings crushed multiple vehicles. A vehicle was flipped in a parking lot and an RV was pushed over. Hundreds of large trees were snapped or uprooted, some damaging homes. There was also significant roof loss on multiple residences, along with blown out garage doors and windows. A few properties had debris impaled into their lawns or homes. The tornado shifted a decommissioned B-52 bomber at Griffiss International Airport before lifting nearby.						
EF1	Ohio	Herkimer	NY	43.3162°N 74.9864°W	19:57–19:59	0.7 mi (1.1 km)	180 yd (160 m)
EF1	Trees were snapped or uprooted throughout the town.						
EF1	ESE of Old Forge to SSW of Inlet	Herkimer	NY	43.6761°N 74.877°W	20:10–20:16	4.1 mi (6.6 km)	150 yd (140 m)
EF1	Satellite imagery showed widespread tree damage which correlated with a TDS on radar.						
EF1	WSW of Wells	Hamilton	NY	43.3603°N 74.4044°W	20:30–20:33	1.53 mi (2.46 km)	300 yd (270 m)
EF1	This tornado touched down along the West Branch of the Sacandaga River, downing and snapping trees.						
EF1	ENE of Piseco	Hamilton	NY	43.4394°N 74.4802°W	20:37–20:39	0.51 mi (0.82 km)	200 yd (180 m)
EF1	This tornado snapped and uprooted numerous trees and utility poles. Minor structural damage to homes and utility buildings occurred as well.						
EF1	NE of Wells	Hamilton, Warren	NY	43.424°N 74.2011°W	20:44–20:52	4.56 mi (7.34 km)	200 yd (180 m)
EF1	Satellite imagery showed widespread tree damage which correlated with a TDS on radar.						
EF1	NNE of Edinburg to W of Corinth	Saratoga	NY	43.2539°N 74.0641°W	20:48–21:00	8.36 mi (13.45 km)	50 yd (46 m)
EF1	This high-end EF1 tornado occurred within a large area of wind damage, with some trees downed in a convergent pattern. During clean up efforts, a woman was seriously injured after being struck by a tree.						
EF0	NW of Warrensburg to NNW of Bolton Landing	Warren	NY	43.5655°N 73.8502°W	21:22–21:29	9.64 mi (15.51 km)	150 yd (140 m)
EF0	This high-end EF0 tornado snapped and uprooted numerous trees. Several utility poles were also snapped or downed.						
EF1	NNE of Lyme	Grafton	NH	43.82°N 72.15°W	23:29–23:36	1.8 mi (2.9 km)	250 yd (230 m)
EF1	A high-end EF1 tornado first touched down near a pond, downing numerous trees on the pond's western shoreline. The tornado then tracked due north, causing sporadic tree damage. The tornado then grew wider and snapped and uprooted hundreds of trees. A garage was also shifted 15 ft (4.6 m), and a tree fell onto the roof of a home. The tornado then climbed a hill, continuing to increase in severity as trees and branches fell on homes, lifting shortly thereafter.						
EF1	W of Broken Bow	Custer	NE	41.403°N 99.675°W	23:54	0.01 mi (0.016 km)	1 yd (0.91 m)
EF1	This extremely brief tornado which was observed by a storm spotter and captured on a surveillance camera was embedded within a much larger area of both damaging straight-line winds and large hail. It tossed an 800 lb (360 kg) trailer onto the far front corner panel of a car and moved a Suburban 3 in (76 mm) during the two seconds it was in contact with the ground.						

== Impacts ==
Three people were injured when severe winds downed trees in Miles City, Montana. A woman died when a tree fell on their home in Cedar Lake, Indiana. 500,000 customers in the Midwestern United States were left without power. Two elderly residents of Alton, Illinois, drowned when their vehicle was overtaken by a flooded roadway near Elsah. At O'Hare International Airport, an EF0 tornado was confirmed to have struck the terminal, being embedded in a swath of 70–80 mph (110–130 km/h). Despite advanced warnings, multiple flights were allowed to board before the storm hit, being stranded on the runway as travelers and staff at the airport took shelter.

=== Rockford, Illinois ===
A multi-day flood event fueled by the ring of fire pattern brought historic flooding to Rockford, Illinois. The city's stormwater management systems were overwhelmed, as its 30,000 municipal drains were backed up by a 200-year flood. Numerous flash flood reports were received by the National Weather Service as one-hour rain totals reached up to 4 in (10 cm). Roads were closed and the Rockford Fire Department performed water rescue operations to assist stranded drivers. One fatality was confirmed in Rockford from the flooding conditions.

=== Nashville, Illinois ===
On July 16, heavy rainfall attributed to the now-weakened derecho the previous night threatened to overtop the Nashville City Reservoir Dam, which prompted the evacuation of 200 homes in Nashville, Illinois. First responders working with Washington County emergency management assisted a resident unable to evacuate initially.

Later that day, a controlled failure of the fuse plug of the secondary dam on the Nashville City Reservoir led to flash flood conditions as water from the reservoir entered the evacuated areas of Nashville. After the rain subsided, inspectors from the United States Army Corps of Engineers conducted a brief drone survey of the dam structure and deemed it safe for residents to return. The Nashville City Reservoir Dam had been known to have a "high hazard" of failure by regulators with the Illinois Department of Natural Resources, as do a total of 15% of dams in Illinois, according to the Association of State Dam Safety Officials.

== See also ==
- Weather of 2024
- 1967 Oak Lawn tornado outbreak
- List of North American tornadoes and tornado outbreaks
- List of derecho events
