= Enhanced Fujita scale =

Tornado intensity rating scale

Enhanced Fujita Scale
EFU	Unknown	No surveyable damage
EF0	65–85 mph	Light damage
EF1	86–110 mph	Moderate damage
EF2	111–135 mph	Considerable damage
EF3	136–165 mph	Severe damage
EF4	166–200 mph	Devastating damage
EF5	>200 mph	Incredible damage

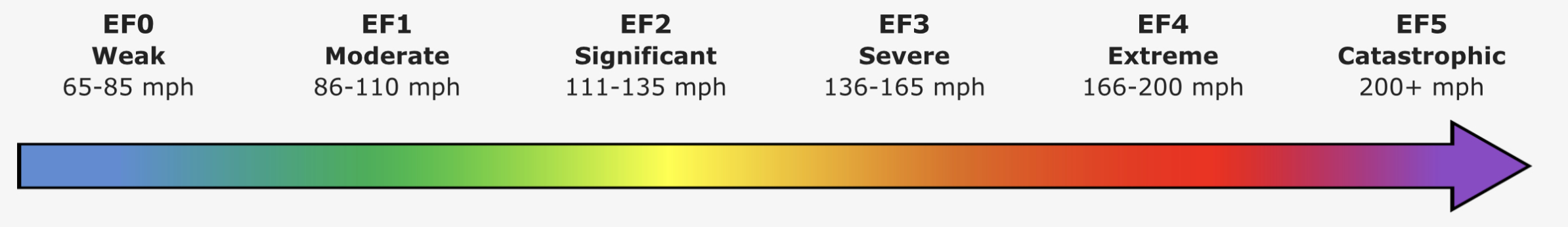
The National Weather Service's arrow showing the EF scale. This includes a description word for each level of the scale.

The Enhanced Fujita scale (abbreviated EF-Scale) is a scale that rates tornado intensity based on the severity of the damage a tornado causes. It is used in the United States, Brazil and France, among other countries. The EF scale is also unofficially used in other countries, including China. The rating of a tornado is determined by conducting a tornado damage survey.

The scale has the same basic design as the original Fujita scale—six intensity categories from zero to five, representing increasing degrees of damage. It was revised to reflect better examinations of tornado damage surveys, in order to align wind speeds more closely with associated storm damage. Better standardizing and elucidating what was previously subjective and ambiguous, it also adds more types of structures and vegetation, expands degrees of damage, and better accounts for variables such as differences in construction quality. An "EF-Unknown" (EFU) category was later added for tornadoes that cannot be rated due to a lack of damage evidence.

As with the Fujita scale, the Enhanced Fujita scale is a damage scale and only an estimate for actual wind speeds. While the wind speeds associated with the damage listed did not and have not undergone empirical analysis (such as detailed physical or any numerical modeling) due to expensive costs, the wind speeds were obtained through a process called expert elicitation, which was based on various engineering studies since the 1970s as well as from the field experience of meteorologists and engineers. Unlike the original Fujita scale and International Fujita scale, ratings on the Enhanced Fujita scale are based solely off the effects of 3-second gusts on any given damage indicator.

== History ==
The Enhanced Fujita scale replaced the decommissioned Fujita scale that was introduced in 1971 by Ted Fujita. Operational use began in the United States on February 1, 2007, followed by Canada on April 1, 2013, who uses a modified version known as the CEF-scale. (Note: Sources also commonly refer to the CEF-scale simply as the "EF-scale" or "Enhanced Fujita Scale", especially when the context is unambiguously referring to the Canadian version.) It has also been in use in France since 2008, albeit modified slightly by using damage indicators that take into account French construction standards, native vegetation, and the use of metric units. In Brazil, the EF Scale is used by the Reporting Platform and Voluntary Network of Severe Storm Observers (PREVOTS) since June 2018, and by other agencies since 2025. Similarly, the Japanese implementation of the scale is also modified along similar lines; the Japanese variant is referred to locally in Japan as the JEF or Japanese Enhanced Fujita Scale. The scale is also used unofficially in other countries, such as China.

The newer scale was publicly unveiled on October 4, 2004, at the American Meteorological Society's 22nd Conference on Severe Local Storms in Hyannis, Massachusetts. It was developed from 2000 to 2004 by the Fujita Scale Enhancement Project of the Wind Science and Engineering Research Center at Texas Tech University, which brought together dozens of expert meteorologists and civil engineers in addition to its own resources.

Frequency of tornadoes by rating on the Enhanced Fujita scale
1. EFU (3.11%)
2. EF0 (52.8%)
3. EF1 (33.0%)
4. EF2 (8.41%)
5. EF3 (2.18%)
6. EF4 (0.45%)
7. EF5 (0.05%)

The scale was used for the first time in the United States a year after its public announcement when parts of central Florida were struck by multiple tornadoes, the strongest of which were rated at EF3 on the new scale.

In November 2022, a research paper was published that revealed a more standardized EF-scale was in the works. This newer scale is expected to combine and create damage indicators, and introduce new methods of estimating wind speeds in tornadoes. Some of these newer methods include mobile doppler radar and forensic engineering.

In 2024, Anthony W. Lyza, Matthew D. Flournoy, and A. Addison Alford, researchers with the National Severe Storms Laboratory, Storm Prediction Center, CIWRO, and the University of Oklahoma's School of Meteorology, published a paper stating, ">20% of supercell tornadoes may be capable of producing EF4–EF5 damage".

== Parameters ==
The seven categories for the EF scale are listed below, in order of increasing intensity. Although the wind speed estimates and photographic damage examples have been updated, the damage descriptions are broadly derived from those used with the Fujita scale. In operational practice, however, damage indicators and degrees of damage are predominantly used in determining tornado intensity.

Scale	Wind speed estimate			Frequency	Descriptor	Example of damage
Scale	mph	km/h	knots	Frequency	Descriptor	Example of damage
EFU	—N/a	—N/a	—N/a	3.11%	No surveyable damage	—N/a
EFU	Intensity cannot be determined due to a lack of information. This rating applies to tornadoes that traverse areas with no damage indicators, cause damage in an area that cannot be accessed by a survey, or cause damage that cannot be differentiated from that of another tornado.					—N/a
EF0	65–85	105–137	57–74	52.82%	Light damage	EF0 damage example--Some shingles of the house's roof were blown off. There is additional minor damage to the house's roof.
EF0	Well-built structures are typically unscathed, sometimes sustaining broken windows, with minor damage to roofs and chimneys. Billboards and large signs can be knocked down. Trees may have large branches broken off and may be uprooted if they have shallow roots.					EF0 damage example--Some shingles of the house's roof were blown off. There is additional minor damage to the house's roof.
EF1	86–110	138–177	75–95	32.98%	Moderate damage	EF1 damage example-- A majority of the house's roof was blown away, some siding was torn away, and the roof's shingles were blown off or loosened.
EF1	Damage to mobile homes and other temporary structures becomes significant, and cars and other vehicles may be pushed off the road or flipped. Permanent structures can suffer major damage to their roofs, with corners or edges of roofs being torn off completely. Larger trees can be uprooted.					EF1 damage example-- A majority of the house's roof was blown away, some siding was torn away, and the roof's shingles were blown off or loosened.
EF2	111–135	178–217	96–117	8.41%	Considerable damage	EF2 damage example-- The entire roof of the house was blown off, with only the skeleton of the roof remaining.
EF2	Well-built structures can suffer severe damage (including roof loss), and the collapse of some exterior walls may occur in poorly built structures. Mobile homes are often heavily damaged or destroyed. Vehicles can be lifted off the ground, and lighter objects can become small missiles, causing damage outside of the tornado's main path. Wooded areas have a large percentage of their trees snapped or uprooted.					EF2 damage example-- The entire roof of the house was blown off, with only the skeleton of the roof remaining.
EF3	136–165	218–266	118–143	2.18%	Severe damage	EF3 damage example-- The majority of the house was heavily damaged, with some trees uprooted in the background. Only a portion of a wall remains. Debris is scattered at the site of impact.
EF3	A few parts of affected buildings are left standing. Well-built structures lose all outer and some inner walls. Unanchored homes are swept away, and homes with poor anchoring may collapse entirely. Trains and train cars are all overturned. Small vehicles and similarly sized objects are lifted off the ground and tossed as projectiles. Wooded areas suffer an almost total loss of vegetation and some tree debarking may occur.					EF3 damage example-- The majority of the house was heavily damaged, with some trees uprooted in the background. Only a portion of a wall remains. Debris is scattered at the site of impact.
EF4	166–200	267–322	144–174	0.45%	Devastating damage	EF4 damage example -- The majority of the house, except for its foundation, is mainly destroyed. Debris is scattered throughout the destroyed house.
EF4	Well-built homes are reduced to a short pile of medium-sized debris on the foundation. Homes with poor or no anchoring are swept completely away. Large, heavy vehicles, including airplanes, trains, and large trucks, can be pushed over, flipped repeatedly, or picked up and thrown. Large, healthy trees are entirely debarked and snapped off close to the ground or uprooted altogether and turned into flying projectiles. Passenger cars and similarly sized objects can be picked up and flung for considerable distances.					EF4 damage example -- The majority of the house, except for its foundation, is mainly destroyed. Debris is scattered throughout the destroyed house.
EF5	201+	323+	175+	0.05%	Incredible damage	EF5 damage example--There are no remains of the structure. Not even the foundation of the structure remains, just the slab. Debris at the site of the impact is also minimal due to the extreme wind speeds of an EF5 tornado.
EF5	Well-built and well-anchored homes are swept cleanly off their foundations and obliterated. Large, steel-reinforced structures such as schools are completely leveled. Low-lying grass and vegetation are shredded from the ground. Trees are completely debarked and snapped. Very little recognizable structural debris is generated with most materials reduced to a coarse, dispersed mix of small, granular particles. Large, multiple-ton steel frame vehicles and farm equipment are often mangled beyond recognition and tossed miles away or reduced entirely to unrecognizable parts. Tall buildings collapse or suffer severe structural deformation.					EF5 damage example--There are no remains of the structure. Not even the foundation of the structure remains, just the slab. Debris at the site of the impact is also minimal due to the extreme wind speeds of an EF5 tornado.

=== Damage indicators and degrees of damage ===
The EF scale currently has 28 damage indicators (DI), or types of structures and vegetation, each with a varying number of degrees of damage (DoD). Each structure has a maximum DoD value, which is given by total destruction. Lesser damage to a structure will yield lower DoD values. Wind speed estimates are divided into three categories; Lower Bound (LB), Expected (EXP), and Upper Bound (UB). EXP is the average wind speed estimate needed to cause the DoD for the "typical construction" of the DI. If the construction of the DI was better/worse than typical, the LB/UB values would be used.

DI No.	Damage Indicator (DI)	DoD	Damage description	Wind speed estimate mph (km/h)		
DI No.	Damage Indicator (DI)	DoD	Damage description	LB	EXP	UB
1	Small barns or farm outbuildings (SBO)	1	Threshold of visible damage	53 (85)	62 (100)	78 (126)
1	Small barns or farm outbuildings (SBO)	2	Loss of wood or metal roof panels	61 (98)	74 (119)	91 (146)
1	Small barns or farm outbuildings (SBO)	3	Collapse of doors	68 (109)	83 (134)	102 (164)
1	Small barns or farm outbuildings (SBO)	4	Major loss of roof panels	78 (126)	90 (140)	110 (180)
1	Small barns or farm outbuildings (SBO)	5	Uplift or collapse of roof structure	77 (124)	93 (150)	114 (183)
1	Small barns or farm outbuildings (SBO)	6	Collapse of walls	81 (130)	97 (156)	119 (192)
1	Small barns or farm outbuildings (SBO)	7	Overturning or sliding of entire structure	83 (134)	99 (159)	118 (190)
1	Small barns or farm outbuildings (SBO)	8	Total destruction of building	94 (151)	112 (180)	131 (211)
2	One- or two-family residences (FR12)	1	Threshold of visible damage	53 (85)	65 (105)	80 (130)
2	One- or two-family residences (FR12)	2	Loss of roof covering material (<20%), gutters and/or awning; loss of vinyl or metal sheeting	63 (101)	79 (127)	97 (156)
2	One- or two-family residences (FR12)	3	Broken glass in doors and windows	79 (127)	96 (154)	114 (183)
2	One- or two-family residences (FR12)	4	Uplift of roof deck and loss of significant roof covering material (>20%); collapse of chimney; garage doors collapse inward; failure of porch or carport	81 (130)	97 (156)	116 (187)
2	One- or two-family residences (FR12)	5	Entire house shifts off foundation	103 (166)	121 (195)	141 (227)
2	One- or two-family residences (FR12)	6	Large sections of roof structure removed; most walls remain standing	104 (167)	122 (196)	142 (229)
2	One- or two-family residences (FR12)	7	Exterior walls collapsed	113 (182)	132 (212)	153 (246)
2	One- or two-family residences (FR12)	8	Most walls collapsed, except small interior rooms	127 (204)	152 (245)	178 (286)
2	One- or two-family residences (FR12)	9	All walls collapsed	142 (229)	170 (270)	198 (319)
2	One- or two-family residences (FR12)	10	Destruction of engineered and/or well constructed residence; slab swept clean	165 (266)	200 (320)	220 (350)
3	Manufactured home – single wide (MHSW)	1	Threshold of visible damage	51 (82)	61 (98)	76 (122)
3	Manufactured home – single wide (MHSW)	2	Loss of shingles or partial uplift of one-piece metal roof covering	61 (98)	74 (119)	92 (148)
3	Manufactured home – single wide (MHSW)	3	Unit slides off block piers but remains upright	72 (116)	87 (140)	103 (166)
3	Manufactured home – single wide (MHSW)	4	Complete uplift of roof; most walls remain standing	73 (117)	89 (143)	112 (180)
3	Manufactured home – single wide (MHSW)	5	Unit rolls on its side or upside down; remains essentially intact	84 (135)	98 (158)	114 (183)
3	Manufactured home – single wide (MHSW)	6	Destruction of roof and walls leaving floor and undercarriage in place	87 (140)	105 (169)	123 (198)
3	Manufactured home – single wide (MHSW)	7	Unit rolls or vaults; roof and walls separate from floor and undercarriage	96 (154)	109 (175)	128 (206)
3	Manufactured home – single wide (MHSW)	8	Undercarriage separates from unit; rolls, tumbles and is badly bent	101 (163)	118 (190)	136 (219)
3	Manufactured home – single wide (MHSW)	9	Complete destruction of unit; debris blown away	110 (180)	127 (204)	148 (238)
4	Manufactured home – double wide (MHDW)	1	Threshold of visible damage	51 (82)	61 (98)	76 (122)
4	Manufactured home – double wide (MHDW)	2	Loss of shingles or other roof covering (<20%)	62 (100)	76 (122)	88 (142)
4	Manufactured home – double wide (MHDW)	3	Damaged porches or carports	67 (108)	78 (126)	96 (154)
4	Manufactured home – double wide (MHDW)	4	Broken windows	68 (109)	83 (134)	95 (153)
4	Manufactured home – double wide (MHDW)	5	Uplift of roof deck and loss of significant roof covering material (>20%)	75 (121)	88 (142)	108 (174)
4	Manufactured home – double wide (MHDW)	6	Complete uplift of roof; most walls remain standing	77 (124)	93 (150)	110 (180)
4	Manufactured home – double wide (MHDW)	7	Unit slides off CMU block piers	78 (126)	94 (151)	109 (175)
4	Manufactured home – double wide (MHDW)	8	Removal of entire roof structure leaving most walls standing	80 (130)	97 (156)	117 (188)
4	Manufactured home – double wide (MHDW)	9	Complete destruction of roof and walls leaving undercarriage in place	93 (150)	113 (182)	131 (211)
4	Manufactured home – double wide (MHDW)	10	Unit rolls, displaces or vaults	82 (132)	114 (183)	130 (210)
4	Manufactured home – double wide (MHDW)	11	Undercarriage separates from floor, rolls and tumbles, badly bent	109 (175)	127 (204)	145 (233)
4	Manufactured home – double wide (MHDW)	12	Complete destruction of unit; debris blown away	119 (192)	134 (216)	154 (248)
5	Apartments, condos, townhouses [three stories or less] (ACT)	1	Threshold of visible damage	63 (101)	76 (122)	95 (153)
5	Apartments, condos, townhouses [three stories or less] (ACT)	2	Loss of roof covering (<20%)	82 (132)	99 (159)	121 (195)
5	Apartments, condos, townhouses [three stories or less] (ACT)	3	Uplift of roof decking; significant loss of roof covering (>20%)	107 (172)	124 (200)	146 (235)
5	Apartments, condos, townhouses [three stories or less] (ACT)	4	Uplift or collapse of roof structure leaving most walls standing	120 (190)	138 (222)	158 (254)
5	Apartments, condos, townhouses [three stories or less] (ACT)	5	Most top story walls collapsed	138 (222)	158 (254)	184 (296)
5	Apartments, condos, townhouses [three stories or less] (ACT)	6	Almost total destruction of top two stories	155 (249)	180 (290)	205 (330)
5	Apartments, condos, townhouses [three stories or less] (ACT)	7	Total destruction of entire building	N/A	N/A	N/A
6	Motel (M)	1	Threshold of visible damage	54 (87)	66 (106)	83 (134)
6	Motel (M)	2	Loss of roof covering (<20%)	67 (108)	80 (130)	99 (159)
6	Motel (M)	3	Broken windows or patio doors	74 (119)	89 (143)	107 (172)
6	Motel (M)	4	Uplift of roof decking; significant loss of roof covering (>20%); loss of EIFS wall cladding	80 (130)	95 (153)	116 (187)
6	Motel (M)	5	Uplift or collapse of canopy over driveway	81 (130)	99 (159)	118 (190)
6	Motel (M)	6	Uplift or collapse of roof structure leaving most walls standing	103 (166)	123 (198)	143 (230)
6	Motel (M)	7	Collapse of top story exterior walls	121 (195)	138 (222)	156 (251)
6	Motel (M)	8	Collapse of most top story walls	127 (204)	143 (230)	162 (261)
6	Motel (M)	9	Collapse of top two floors of three or more stories	144 (232)	170 (270)	185 (298)
6	Motel (M)	10	Total destruction of entire building	163 (262)	190 (310)	217 (349)
7	Masonry apartment or motel building (MAM)	1	Threshold of visible damage	54 (87)	65 (105)	81 (130)
7	Masonry apartment or motel building (MAM)	2	Loss of roof covering (<20%)	67 (108)	80 (130)	101 (163)
7	Masonry apartment or motel building (MAM)	3	Uplift of lightweight metal roof decking	81 (130)	95 (153)	116 (187)
7	Masonry apartment or motel building (MAM)	4	Uplift of pre-cast or cast-in-place concrete roof decking	103 (166)	121 (195)	143 (230)
7	Masonry apartment or motel building (MAM)	5	Collapse of top story walls	115 (185)	133 (214)	150 (240)
7	Masonry apartment or motel building (MAM)	6	Collapse of top two floors of three or more stories	132 (212)	156 (251)	180 (290)
7	Masonry apartment or motel building (MAM)	7	Total destruction of a large section of building	160 (260)	180 (290)	205 (330)
8	Small retail building [fast-food restaurants] (SRB)	1	Threshold of visible damage	54 (87)	65 (105)	81 (130)
8	Small retail building [fast-food restaurants] (SRB)	2	Loss of roof covering (<20%)	65 (105)	78 (126)	98 (158)
8	Small retail building [fast-food restaurants] (SRB)	3	Broken glass in windows and doors	72 (116)	86 (138)	103 (166)
8	Small retail building [fast-food restaurants] (SRB)	4	Uplift of roof decking; significant loss of roof covering (>20%)	81 (130)	98 (158)	119 (192)
8	Small retail building [fast-food restaurants] (SRB)	5	Canopies or covered walkways destroyed	83 (134)	98 (158)	114 (183)
8	Small retail building [fast-food restaurants] (SRB)	6	Uplift or collapse of entire roof structure	101 (163)	119 (192)	140 (230)
8	Small retail building [fast-food restaurants] (SRB)	7	Collapse of exterior walls; closely spaced interior walls remain standing	120 (190)	138 (222)	159 (256)
8	Small retail building [fast-food restaurants] (SRB)	8	Total destruction of entire building	143 (230)	167 (269)	193 (311)
9	Small professional building [doctor's office, branch banks] (SPB)	1	Threshold of visible damage	54 (87)	65 (105)	81 (130)
9	Small professional building [doctor's office, branch banks] (SPB)	2	Loss of roof covering (<20%)	65 (105)	78 (126)	98 (158)
9	Small professional building [doctor's office, branch banks] (SPB)	3	Broken windows, including clear story windows or skylights	74 (119)	89 (143)	107 (172)
9	Small professional building [doctor's office, branch banks] (SPB)	4	Exterior doors fail	82 (132)	100 (160)	118 (190)
9	Small professional building [doctor's office, branch banks] (SPB)	5	Uplift of roof decking; significant loss of roof covering (>20%)	84 (135)	100 (160)	117 (188)
9	Small professional building [doctor's office, branch banks] (SPB)	6	Collapsed façade or parapet walls	85 (137)	103 (166)	123 (198)
9	Small professional building [doctor's office, branch banks] (SPB)	7	Uplift or collapse of entire roof structure	105 (169)	124 (200)	145 (233)
9	Small professional building [doctor's office, branch banks] (SPB)	8	Collapse of exterior walls; closely spaced intereior walls remain standing	123 (198)	144 (232)	165 (266)
9	Small professional building [doctor's office, branch banks] (SPB)	9	Total destruction of entire building	148 (238)	157 (253)	200 (320)
10	Strip mall (SM)	1	Threshold of visible damage	54 (87)	65 (105)	81 (130)
10	Strip mall (SM)	2	Uplift of roof covering at eaves and roof corners	66 (106)	80 (130)	100 (160)
10	Strip mall (SM)	3	Broken windows or glass doors	72 (116)	88 (142)	105 (169)
10	Strip mall (SM)	4	Uplift of roof decking	84 (135)	101 (163)	122 (196)
10	Strip mall (SM)	5	Collapsed façade or parapet walls	85 (137)	103 (166)	125 (201)
10	Strip mall (SM)	6	Covered walkways uplifted or collapsed	86 (138)	103 (166)	125 (201)
10	Strip mall (SM)	7	Uplift or collapse of entire roof structure	103 (166)	122 (196)	143 (230)
10	Strip mall (SM)	8	Collapse of exterior walls; closely spaced interior walls remain standing	117 (188)	140 (230)	165 (266)
10	Strip mall (SM)	9	Complete destruction of all or a large section of building	147 (237)	171 (275)	198 (319)
11	Large shopping mall (LSM)	1	Threshold of visible damage	59 (95)	71 (114)	86 (138)
11	Large shopping mall (LSM)	2	Loss of roof covering (<20%)	69 (111)	85 (137)	105 (169)
11	Large shopping mall (LSM)	3	Broken skylights, clearstory windows and atrium walls broken	75 (121)	92 (148)	114 (183)
11	Large shopping mall (LSM)	4	Uplift of some roof decking; significant loss of roofing material (>20%); loss of rooftop HVAC	92 (148)	108 (174)	128 (206)
11	Large shopping mall (LSM)	5	Wall cladding stripped starting at corners and progressing to other areas	94 (151)	111 (179)	131 (211)
11	Large shopping mall (LSM)	6	Roof structure uplifted or collapsed	108 (174)	128 (206)	150 (240)
11	Large shopping mall (LSM)	7	Exterior walls in top story collapsed	124 (200)	144 (232)	166 (267)
11	Large shopping mall (LSM)	8	Interior walls of top story collapse	139 (224)	160 (260)	185 (298)
11	Large shopping mall (LSM)	9	Complete destruction of all or a large section of the building	176 (283)	204 (328)	247 (398)
12	Large, isolated retail building [Wal-Mart, Home Depot] (LIRB)	1	Threshold of visible damage	57 (92)	68 (109)	83 (134)
12	Large, isolated retail building [Wal-Mart, Home Depot] (LIRB)	2	Loss of roof covering (<20%)	68 (109)	81 (130)	103 (166)
12	Large, isolated retail building [Wal-Mart, Home Depot] (LIRB)	3	Uplift of some roof decking; significant loss of roofing material (>20%); loss of rooftop HVAC	87 (140)	103 (166)	123 (198)
12	Large, isolated retail building [Wal-Mart, Home Depot] (LIRB)	4	Long roof spans collapsed downard	103 (166)	122 (196)	144 (232)
12	Large, isolated retail building [Wal-Mart, Home Depot] (LIRB)	5	Uplift and removal of roof structure	114 (183)	134 (216)	157 (253)
12	Large, isolated retail building [Wal-Mart, Home Depot] (LIRB)	6	Inward or outward collapse of exterior walls	118 (190)	137 (220)	158 (254)
12	Large, isolated retail building [Wal-Mart, Home Depot] (LIRB)	7	Complete destruction of all or a large section of the building	147 (237)	173 (278)	201 (323)
13	Automobile showroom (ASR)	1	Threshold of visible damage	47 (76)	65 (105)	80 (130)
13	Automobile showroom (ASR)	2	Loss of roof covering (<20%)	67 (108)	80 (130)	101 (163)
13	Automobile showroom (ASR)	3	Broken glass in windows or doors	71 (114)	87 (140)	106 (171)
13	Automobile showroom (ASR)	4	Uplift of some roof decking; significant loss of roofing material (>20%); loss of rooftop HVAC	83 (134)	101 (163)	120 (190)
13	Automobile showroom (ASR)	5	Cladding stripped off walls	94 (151)	112 (180)	132 (212)
13	Automobile showroom (ASR)	6	Uplift or collapse of roof structure	98 (158)	118 (190)	140 (230)
13	Automobile showroom (ASR)	7	Exterior walls collapsed	106 (171)	126 (203)	148 (238)
13	Automobile showroom (ASR)	8	Complete destruction of all or a large section of the building	138 (222)	157 (253)	181 (291)
14	Automobile service building (ASB)	1	Threshold of visible damage	46 (74)	63 (101)	79 (127)
14	Automobile service building (ASB)	2	Loss of roof covering (<20%)	65 (105)	78 (126)	99 (159)
14	Automobile service building (ASB)	3	Failure of large overhead doors	77 (124)	91 (146)	110 (180)
14	Automobile service building (ASB)	4	Uplift of some roof decking; significant loss of roofing material (>20%); loss of rooftop HVAC	80 (130)	98 (158)	119 (192)
14	Automobile service building (ASB)	5	Collapse of non-bearing masonry or tilt-up walls	94 (151)	114 (183)	134 (216)
14	Automobile service building (ASB)	6	Uplift or collapse of roof structure	102 (164)	121 (195)	143 (230)
14	Automobile service building (ASB)	7	Collapse of load-bearing walls	106 (171)	128 (206)	149 (240)
14	Automobile service building (ASB)	8	Complete destruction of all or a large section of the building	138 (222)	157 (253)	181 (291)
15	Elementary school [single-story; interior or exterior hallways] (ES)	1	Threshold of visible damage	47 (76)	65 (105)	80 (130)
15	Elementary school [single-story; interior or exterior hallways] (ES)	2	Loss of roof covering (<20%)	66 (106)	79 (127)	99 (159)
15	Elementary school [single-story; interior or exterior hallways] (ES)	3	Broken windows	71 (114)	87 (140)	106 (171)
15	Elementary school [single-story; interior or exterior hallways] (ES)	4	Exterior door failures	85 (137)	99 (159)	118 (190)
15	Elementary school [single-story; interior or exterior hallways] (ES)	5	Uplift of some roof decking; significant loss of roofing material (>20%); loss of rooftop HVAC	82 (132)	101 (163)	121 (195)
15	Elementary school [single-story; interior or exterior hallways] (ES)	6	Damage to or loss of wall cladding	92 (148)	108 (174)	127 (204)
15	Elementary school [single-story; interior or exterior hallways] (ES)	7	Uplift or collapse of roof structure	108 (174)	125 (201)	148 (238)
15	Elementary school [single-story; interior or exterior hallways] (ES)	8	Collapse of non-bearing walls	117 (188)	139 (224)	162 (261)
15	Elementary school [single-story; interior or exterior hallways] (ES)	9	Collapse of load-bearing walls	130 (210)	153 (246)	180 (290)
15	Elementary school [single-story; interior or exterior hallways] (ES)	10	Total destruction of a large section of building or entire building	152 (245)	176 (283)	203 (327)
16	Junior or senior high school (JHSH)	1	Threshold of visible damage	55 (89)	68 (109)	83 (134)
16	Junior or senior high school (JHSH)	2	Loss of roof covering (<20%)	66 (106)	79 (127)	99 (159)
16	Junior or senior high school (JHSH)	3	Broken windows	71 (114)	87 (140)	106 (171)
16	Junior or senior high school (JHSH)	4	Exterior door failures	83 (134)	101 (163)	121 (195)
16	Junior or senior high school (JHSH)	5	Uplift of metal roof decking; significant loss of roofing material (>20%); loss of rooftop HVAC	85 (137)	101 (163)	119 (192)
16	Junior or senior high school (JHSH)	6	Damage to or loss of wall cladding	92 (148)	108 (174)	127 (204)
16	Junior or senior high school (JHSH)	7	Collapse of tall masonry walls at gym, cafeteria or auditorium	94 (151)	114 (183)	136 (219)
16	Junior or senior high school (JHSH)	8	Uplift or collapse of light steel roof structure	108 (174)	125 (201)	148 (238)
16	Junior or senior high school (JHSH)	9	Collapse of exterior walls in top floor	121 (195)	139 (224)	153 (246)
16	Junior or senior high school (JHSH)	10	Most interior walls of top floor collapsed	133 (214)	158 (254)	186 (299)
16	Junior or senior high school (JHSH)	11	Total destruction of a large section of building envelope	163 (262)	192 (309)	224 (360)
16	Junior or senior high school (JHSH)	12	Significant damage to steel or concrete structural system	N/A	N/A	N/A
17	Low-rise building [1–4 stories] (LRB)	1	Threshold of visible damage	55 (89)	68 (109)	83 (134)
17	Low-rise building [1–4 stories] (LRB)	2	Loss of roof covering (<20%)	67 (108)	80 (130)	103 (166)
17	Low-rise building [1–4 stories] (LRB)	3	Uplift of metal roof decking at eaves and roof corners: significant loss of roofing material (>20%)	83 (134)	101 (163)	120 (190)
17	Low-rise building [1–4 stories] (LRB)	4	Broken glass in windows, entryways or atriums	83 (134)	101 (163)	122 (196)
17	Low-rise building [1–4 stories] (LRB)	5	Uplift of lightweight roof structure	114 (183)	133 (214)	157 (253)
17	Low-rise building [1–4 stories] (LRB)	6	Significant damage to exterior walls and some interior walls	122 (196)	143 (230)	167 (269)
17	Low-rise building [1–4 stories] (LRB)	7	Complete destruction of all or a large section of building	161 (259)	188 (303)	221 (356)
18	Mid-rise building [5–20 stories] (MRB)	1	Threshold of visible damage	58 (93)	70 (110)	86 (138)
18	Mid-rise building [5–20 stories] (MRB)	2	Loss of roof covering (<20%)	68 (109)	83 (134)	103 (166)
18	Mid-rise building [5–20 stories] (MRB)	3	Damage to penthouse roof and walls; loss of rooftop HVAC equipment	75 (121)	92 (148)	113 (182)
18	Mid-rise building [5–20 stories] (MRB)	4	Damage to parapet walls or coping	83 (134)	99 (159)	118 (190)
18	Mid-rise building [5–20 stories] (MRB)	5	Broken glass in curtain walls; glass in entryways; significant damage to building interior	83 (134)	101 (163)	120 (190)
18	Mid-rise building [5–20 stories] (MRB)	6	Uplift of lightweight roof decking; significant loss of roofing material (>20%)	98 (158)	119 (192)	140 (230)
18	Mid-rise building [5–20 stories] (MRB)	7	Broken curtain wall panel anchors	110 (180)	129 (208)	150 (240)
18	Mid-rise building [5–20 stories] (MRB)	8	Uplift or collapse of roof structure	118 (190)	136 (219)	158 (254)
18	Mid-rise building [5–20 stories] (MRB)	9	Significant damage to curtain walls and some interior walls	120 (190)	145 (233)	167 (269)
18	Mid-rise building [5–20 stories] (MRB)	10	Permanent structural deformation	181 (291)	210 (340)	268 (431)
19	High-rise building [more than 20 stories] (HRB)	1	Threshold of visible damage	58 (93)	70 (110)	86 (138)
19	High-rise building [more than 20 stories] (HRB)	2	Loss of roof covering (<20%)	69 (111)	86 (138)	107 (172)
19	High-rise building [more than 20 stories] (HRB)	3	Damage to penthouse roof and walls; loss of rooftop HVAC equipment	75 (121)	93 (150)	111 (179)
19	High-rise building [more than 20 stories] (HRB)	4	Broken glass in exterior walls and first and second floors; broken glass in entryways	83 (134)	101 (163)	120 (190)
19	High-rise building [more than 20 stories] (HRB)	5	Damage to parapet walls or coping	87 (140)	104 (167)	122 (196)
19	High-rise building [more than 20 stories] (HRB)	6	Broken curtain wall panel anchors	110 (180)	129 (208)	157 (253)
19	High-rise building [more than 20 stories] (HRB)	7	Significant loss of roofing material (>20%)	115 (185)	143 (230)	165 (266)
19	High-rise building [more than 20 stories] (HRB)	8	Significant damage to curtain walls and interior walls	123 (198)	145 (233)	172 (277)
19	High-rise building [more than 20 stories] (HRB)	9	Uplift or collapse of roof structure	123 (198)	159 (256)	183 (295)
19	High-rise building [more than 20 stories] (HRB)	10	Significant structural deformation	190 (310)	228 (367)	290 (470)
20	Institutional building [hospital, government or university building] (IB)	1	Threshold of visible damage	59 (95)	72 (116)	88 (142)
20	Institutional building [hospital, government or university building] (IB)	2	Loss of roof covering (<20%)	72 (116)	86 (138)	109 (175)
20	Institutional building [hospital, government or university building] (IB)	3	Damage to penthouse roof and walls; loss of rooftop HVAC equipment	75 (121)	92 (148)	111 (179)
20	Institutional building [hospital, government or university building] (IB)	4	Broken glass in windows or doors	78 (126)	95 (153)	115 (185)
20	Institutional building [hospital, government or university building] (IB)	5	Uplift of lightweight roof deck and insulation; significant loss of roofing material (>20%)	95 (153)	114 (183)	136 (219)
20	Institutional building [hospital, government or university building] (IB)	6	Façade components torn from structure	97 (156)	118 (190)	140 (230)
20	Institutional building [hospital, government or university building] (IB)	7	Damage curtain walls or other wall cladding	110 (180)	131 (211)	152 (245)
20	Institutional building [hospital, government or university building] (IB)	8	Uplift of pre-cast concrete roof slabs	119 (192)	142 (229)	163 (262)
20	Institutional building [hospital, government or university building] (IB)	9	Uplift of metal deck with concrete roof slabs	118 (190)	146 (235)	170 (270)
20	Institutional building [hospital, government or university building] (IB)	10	Collapse of some top story exterior walls	127 (204)	148 (238)	172 (277)
20	Institutional building [hospital, government or university building] (IB)	11	Significant damage to building envelope	178 (286)	210 (340)	268 (431)
21	Metal building system (MBS)	1	Threshold of visible damage	54 (87)	67 (108)	83 (134)
21	Metal building system (MBS)	2	Inward or outward collapse of overhead doors	75 (121)	89 (143)	108 (174)
21	Metal building system (MBS)	3	Metal roof or wall panels pulled from the building	78 (126)	95 (153)	120 (190)
21	Metal building system (MBS)	4	Column anchorage failed	96 (154)	117 (188)	135 (217)
21	Metal building system (MBS)	5	Buckling of roof purlins	95 (153)	118 (190)	138 (222)
21	Metal building system (MBS)	6	Failure of X-braces in the lateral load resisting system	118 (190)	138 (222)	158 (254)
21	Metal building system (MBS)	7	Progressive collapse of rigid frames	120 (190)	143 (230)	168 (270)
21	Metal building system (MBS)	8	Total destruction of building	132 (212)	155 (249)	178 (286)
22	Service station canopy (SSC)	1	Threshold of visible damage	45 (72)	63 (101)	79 (127)
22	Service station canopy (SSC)	2	Fascia material blown from canopy	64 (103)	78 (126)	96 (154)
22	Service station canopy (SSC)	3	Metal roof panels stripped from canopy	74 (119)	92 (148)	113 (182)
22	Service station canopy (SSC)	4	Columns bend or buckle under wind load	88 (142)	109 (175)	135 (217)
22	Service station canopy (SSC)	5	Canopy collapsed due to column foundation failure	90 (140)	114 (183)	144 (232)
22	Service station canopy (SSC)	6	Complete destruction of canopy	110 (180)	133 (214)	163 (262)
23	Warehouse building [tilt-up walls or heavy-timber construction] (WHB)	1	Threshold of visible damage	55 (89)	68 (109)	83 (134)
23	Warehouse building [tilt-up walls or heavy-timber construction] (WHB)	2	Loss of roofing material (<20%)	69 (111)	83 (134)	105 (169)
23	Warehouse building [tilt-up walls or heavy-timber construction] (WHB)	3	Inward or outward collapse of overhead doors	75 (121)	88 (142)	107 (172)
23	Warehouse building [tilt-up walls or heavy-timber construction] (WHB)	4	Uplift of roof deck; significant loss of roofing material (>20%); loss of rooftop HVAC equipment	88 (142)	103 (166)	122 (196)
23	Warehouse building [tilt-up walls or heavy-timber construction] (WHB)	5	Collapse of other non-bearing exterior walls	93 (150)	114 (183)	126 (203)
23	Warehouse building [tilt-up walls or heavy-timber construction] (WHB)	6	Collapse of pre-cast concrete tilt-up panels	102 (164)	124 (200)	144 (232)
23	Warehouse building [tilt-up walls or heavy-timber construction] (WHB)	7	Total destruction of a large section of building or entire building	131 (211)	158 (254)	186 (299)
24	Electrical transmission lines (ETL)	1	Threshold of visible damage	70 (110)	83 (134)	98 (158)
24	Electrical transmission lines (ETL)	2	Broken wood cross member	80 (130)	99 (159)	114 (183)
24	Electrical transmission lines (ETL)	3	Wood poles leaning	85 (137)	108 (174)	130 (210)
24	Electrical transmission lines (ETL)	4	Broken wood poles	98 (158)	118 (190)	142 (229)
24	Electrical transmission lines (ETL)	5	Broken or bent steel or concrete poles	115 (185)	138 (222)	149 (240)
24	Electrical transmission lines (ETL)	6	Collapsed metal truss towers	116 (187)	141 (227)	165 (266)
25	Free-standing towers (FST)	1	Threshold of visible damage	76 (122)	92 (148)	113 (182)
25	Free-standing towers (FST)	2	Collapsed cell-phone tower	113 (182)	133 (214)	157 (253)
25	Free-standing towers (FST)	3	Collapsed micro-wave tower	116 (187)	136 (219)	160 (260)
26	Free-standing light poles, luminary poles, flag poles (FSP)	1	Threshold of visible damage	67 (108)	81 (130)	100 (160)
26	Free-standing light poles, luminary poles, flag poles (FSP)	2	Bent pole	85 (137)	102 (164)	120 (190)
26	Free-standing light poles, luminary poles, flag poles (FSP)	3	Collapsed pole	99 (159)	118 (190)	138 (222)
27	Trees: hardwood (TH)	1	Small limbs broken (up to 1 in (2.5 cm) diameter)	48 (77)	60 (97)	72 (116)
27	Trees: hardwood (TH)	2	Large branches broken (1 in (2.5 cm)–3 in (7.6 cm) diameter)	61 (98)	74 (119)	88 (142)
27	Trees: hardwood (TH)	3	Trees uprooted	76 (122)	91 (146)	118 (190)
27	Trees: hardwood (TH)	4	Trunks snapped	93 (150)	107 (172)	134 (216)
27	Trees: hardwood (TH)	5	Trees debarked with only stubs of largest branches remaining	123 (198)	143 (230)	167 (269)
28	Trees: softwood (TS)	1	Small limbs broken (up to 1 in (2.5 cm) diameter)	48 (77)	60 (97)	72 (116)
28	Trees: softwood (TS)	2	Large branches broken (1 in (2.5 cm)–3 in (7.6 cm) diameter)	62 (100)	75 (121)	88 (142)
28	Trees: softwood (TS)	3	Trees uprooted	73 (117)	87 (140)	113 (182)
28	Trees: softwood (TS)	4	Trunks snapped	88 (142)	104 (167)	128 (206)
28	Trees: softwood (TS)	5	Trees debarked with only stubs of largest branches remaining	112 (180)	131 (211)	153 (246)

== Differences from the Fujita scale ==
The Enhanced Fujita Scale takes into account the quality of construction and standardizes different kinds of structures. The wind speeds on the original scale were deemed by meteorologists and engineers as being too high, and engineering studies indicated that slower winds than initially estimated cause the respective degrees of damage. The old scale lists an F5 tornado as wind speeds of 261–318 mph (420–512 km/h), while the new scale lists an EF5 as a tornado with winds above 200 mph (322 km/h), found to be sufficient to cause the damage previously ascribed to the F5 range of wind speeds. Tornadoes in the United States that occurred before February 1, 2007, retained their original Fujita ratings after the EF Scale was adopted.

The EF Scale retained the same 0–5 category structure as the original Fujita scale, but it changed the operational rating methodology by formalizing 28 Damage Indicators (DI) and 8 Degrees of Damage (DoD), revising the associated wind-speed estimates, and explicitly considering construction quality when evaluating damage. A linear conversion was derived to relate F-scale and EF-scale wind estimates and preserve continuity in the historical database, but tornadoes are not rated operationally by applying that formula. Different structures, depending on their building materials and ability to survive high winds, have their own DIs and DoDs. Some differences do exist between the two scales in the ratings assigned to damage. On the original Fujita scale, a tornado would generally earn an F5 rating by completely destroying and sweeping away frame homes built to typical American construction standards. On the Enhanced Fujita scale that level of damage would generally be rated as high-end EF4, requiring a house of above-standard construction to be rated EF5. A 2025 study indicated that these more rigorous standards resulted in a decrease in the percentage of tornadoes receiving F5/EF5 ratings after the implementation of the new scale. This difference in frequency disappears when high-end EF4 tornadoes, with peak estimated winds of 190–200 miles per hour (310–320 km/h), are included as "EF5 candidates."

Since the EF Scale still uses actual tornado damage and similar degrees of damage for each category to estimate the storm's wind speed, the National Weather Service states that the scale will likely not lead to an increase in the number of tornadoes classified as EF5. Additionally, the upper bound of the wind speed range for EF5 is open—in other words, there is no maximum wind speed designated.

== Rating classifications ==
Tornado rating classifications
Organization	EF0	EF1	EF2	EF3	EF4	EF5	Cit.
NWS Quad Cities, IA/IL	Weak	Moderate	Significant	Severe	Extreme	Catastrophic	
NWS	Weak		Strong		Violent		
NWS			Significant				

For purposes such as tornado climatology studies, Enhanced Fujita scale ratings may be grouped into classes. The National Weather Service classifies EF0 and EF1 as weak, EF2 and EF3 as strong, as EF4 and EF5 as violent. The National Weather Service also uses the EF scale to classify tornadoes with a rating of EF2 and greater as significant. The National Weather Service Quad Cities, Iowa/Illinois uses a modified EF scale wording, which gives a new term for each rating on the scale, going from weak to catastrophic.

== See also ==
- Beaufort scale
- International Fujita scale
- Lists of tornadoes and tornado outbreaks
  - List of F3, EF3, and IF3 tornadoes (2020–present)
  - List of F4, EF4, and IF4 tornadoes
  - List of F5, EF5, and IF5 tornadoes
- Saffir–Simpson hurricane wind scale
- Severe weather terminology (United States)
- TORRO scale
- Tornado intensity and damage
- Wind engineering
