= Ring of fire (meteorology) =

Type of an atmospheric setup

In meteorology, a ring of fire pattern is a type of an atmospheric setup where thunderstorms form along the edges of a strong high-pressure ridge in the upper layer of the atmosphere. These storms can produce severe thunderstorms and flooding around the edges of the ridge. It is a similar phenomenon to the heat dome, and the two typically coincide as functions of strong areas of high atmospheric pressure, with both being most common during the warm season.

In the United States, ring of fire patterns are also commonly contributing factors to warm-season derechos, as extreme atmospheric instability builds near the edges of the ridge.
