= National Weather Service Quad Cities, Iowa/Illinois =

Weather forecast office in Iowa, U.S.

National Weather Service Weather Forecast Office Quad Cities
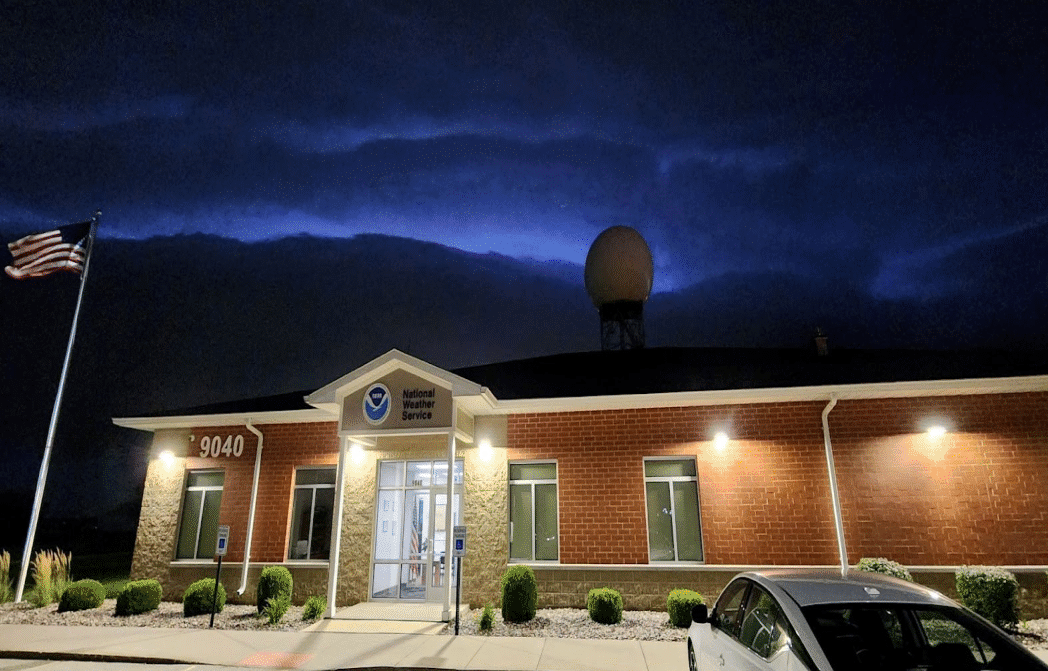
- The forecast office in Davenport, Iowa on August 1, 2024

Agency overview
- Formed: May 24, 1871; 155 years ago
- Type: Meteorological
- Jurisdiction: Federal Government of the United States
- Headquarters: Davenport, Iowa 41.6111°N 90.5855°W
- Agency executives: Ed Holicky, Meteorologist in Charge; Rich Kinney, Warning Coordination Meteorologist
- Parent agency: National Weather Service
- Website: www.weather.gov/dvn/

National Weather Service Quad Cities is a National Weather Service weather forecast office located in Davenport, Iowa. It is tasked with providing weather and emergency information to nearly 1.5 million people across parts of Iowa, Illinois, and Missouri. The forecast office began as a service office in Davenport, moving to various locations across the Quad Cities, before moving into its current location at the Davenport Municipal Airport in 2017. The forecast office was responsible for some warning operations during the August 2020 Midwest derecho, the costliest individual thunderstorm in US history, which heavily affected their area of responsibility.

== History ==
Operations for the Quad Cities service office of the Weather Bureau (later National Weather Service) began on May 24, 1871, as a weather service office on the third floor of the First National Bank building in Davenport, Iowa. Over the following years, the office changed location to the Masonic Temple on April 1, 1890, the second floor of the Post Office on November 3, 1896, the Union Bank building on September 4, 1931, and the third floor of the Post Office on September 26, 1933, all locations in Davenport. Three years later, the office moved to Moline Airport (later Quad Cities International Airport) in Moline, Illinois on October 1, 1936, and over the coming years it would move to various locations all on the grounds of the airport.

A WSR-74 radar unit was commissioned on August 30, 1977, which was dedicated September 13, 1977. On October 27, 1993, construction on a new facility for a weather forecast office in the Quad Cities began near Davenport Municipal Airport, and the Quad Cities weather service office began the process of relocating back to Davenport, while formally accepting weather forecast office status. Part-time operations at the new office began in September 1994, and a WSR-88D radar was installed on November 2 of that year. Full-time operations at the forecast office began on February 20, 1995.

Shortly thereafter, on March 1, 1995, the Quad Cities office's county warning area expanded from 12 to 34 counties – 21 in Iowa and 13 in Illinois. A full team of forecasting staff was achieved in October 1998, with the arrival of five new Senior Forecasters. On November 17, 1999, the weather forecast office in St. Louis, Missouri, transferred responsibility for Clark and Scotland counties in extreme northeast Missouri to the Quad Cities weather office, bringing the total number of counties in the Quad Cities office's county warning area to its present number of 36.

Between June 27 and 29, 2017, the forecast office moved into a new facility, also on the grounds of Davenport Municipal Airport, and had resumed full operations by June 30.

=== Significant events ===
The Quad Cities forecast office has overseen many significant weather events since its foundation, most notably the August 2020 Midwest derecho, which brought widespread winds over 80 mph (130 km/h) across a significant amount of their county warning area, as well as extreme wind gusts estimated at 140 mph (230 km/h) in Cedar Rapids, Iowa. Cedar Rapids and the Quad Cities itself, both within the forecast office's coverage area, were among the most affected areas by the storm, which caused an estimated $11 billion (2020 USD) in damage and is the costliest individual thunderstorm in United States history. Rich Kinney, the office's Warning Coordination Meteorologist, described difficulties issuing warnings during the derecho due to the storm's leading edge moving at 60–70 miles per hour (97–113 km/h), with the office receiving additional personnel in advance of the storm to help issue warnings. However, he stated that forecasters issued severe thunderstorm warnings up to half an hour before severe conditions began in some of the hardest-hit areas.

The forecast office itself has been impacted by multiple storm events, including an F1 tornado that forced open the west entrance door and numerous windows and moved furniture within the facility on April 4, 1981, a 77 mph (124 km/h) wind gust that peeled part of the office's roof on August 20, 2003, and the aforementioned August 2020 derecho that caused the loss of utility power to the office and radar, which mandated the temporary use of backup generators for the next several days. The forecast office experienced 45 to 50 continuous minutes of wind speeds above 60 miles per hour (97 km/h), according to Rich Kinney.

== Operations ==
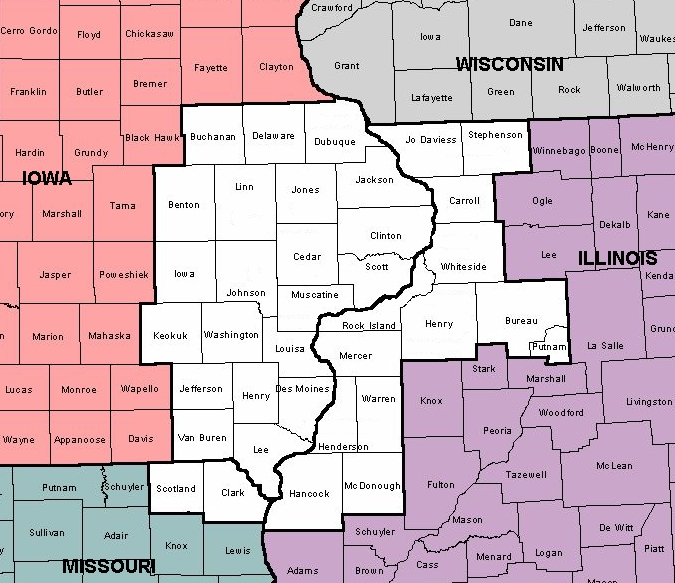
Counties in Iowa, Illinois, and Missouri (indicated in white) served by the Quad Cities WFO

The county warning area of the Quad Cities forecast office includes 36 counties (21 in Iowa, 13 in Illinois, and 2 in Missouri), including a population of nearly 1.5 million in an area of roughly 20,000 square miles (52,000 km^{2}). The office initiates at least two daily weather balloon launches, with more during episodes of expected inclement weather. In addition, the office oversees tornado damage surveys within their area of responsibility.

The forecast office operates volunteer storm spotter classes as part of the Skywarn volunteer spotter network. In 2024, these classes had a total attendance of 1700, out of a total 4000 spotters in the forecast office's area of responsibility.

The forecast office earned a National Weather Service Director's Award in 2024 for its work forecasting and issuing watches and warnings during the Tornado outbreak of March 31 – April 1, 2023. In 2024, the office issued their record highest amount of severe thunderstorm and tornado warnings, with 352 severe thunderstorm warnings issued and 66 tornado warnings issued during the spring and summer season.

== NOAA Weather Radio ==
The Quad Cities forecast office operates the following eleven NOAA Weather Radio transmitters to broadcast weather forecasts, watches, warnings, and other relevant emergency information to persons in its county warning area, as well as adjacent counties served by other NWS forecast offices:

City of license	Call sign	Frequency (MHz)	Service area of transmitter
Cedar Rapids, Iowa	WXL61	162.475 MHz	Cedar Rapids and Iowa City areas
Delaware County, Iowa	KJY64	162.450 MHz	portions of northeast Iowa
Jamestown, Wisconsin	WXL64	162.400 MHz	Dubuque area
Fairfield, Iowa	WXN85	162.400 MHz	portions of southeast Iowa
Eleroy, Illinois	KZZ56	162.450 MHz	Freeport area
Macomb, Illinois	WXJ92	162.500 MHz	portions of west-central Illinois
Jackson County, Iowa	KZZ83	162.425 MHz	extreme east-central Iowa
Kahoka, Missouri	WXL99	162.450 MHz	extreme northeast Missouri, extreme southeast Iowa, extreme west-central Illinois
Tiskilwa, Illinois	WXL22	162.425 MHz	portions of northwest Illinois
Rock Island, Illinois	WXJ73	162.550 MHz	Quad Cities metropolitan area
West Burlington, Iowa	WXN83	162.525 MHz	Burlington area
