= List of case studies on tornadoes (2020–present) =

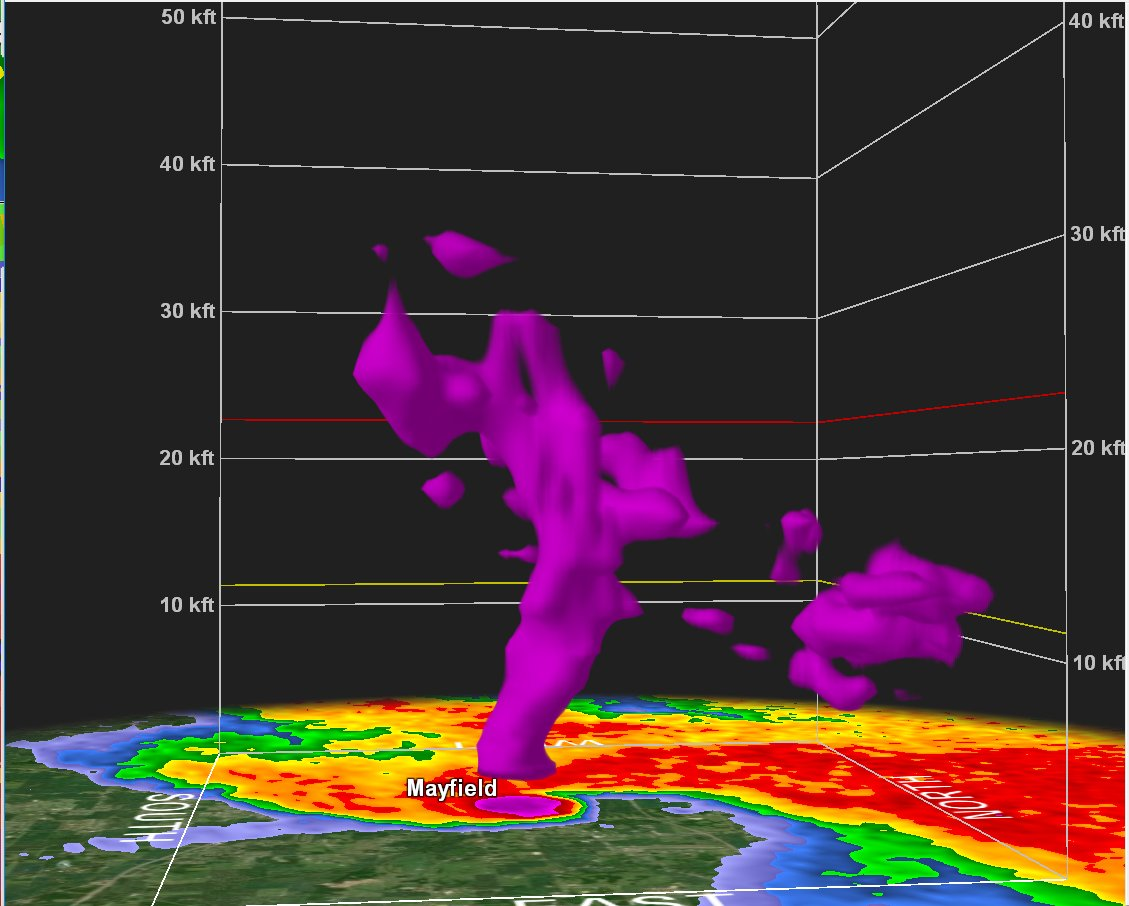
Radar 3D volume scan of the 2021 Western Kentucky tornado showing debris lofted over 30,000 feet (9.1 km) in the air as the tornado struck Mayfield, Kentucky

This is a list of government or academic case studies on individual tornadoes or tornado outbreaks which occurred during the 2020s. A case study is an in-depth analysis which focuses on a single event, several events, and/or a specific aspect of an event.

== List ==
Case studies published by academia are included in this list. As part of the United States National Weather Service's (NWS) and Environment and Climate Change Canada's (ECCC) official duties, they are required to conduct a damage survey on every tornado in the United States and Canada. For this reason, only publications by the NWS and ECCC beyond a standard damage survey are included as, on average, over 1,200 tornadoes occur annually in the two countries together. Tornado records in Europe are kept by the European Severe Storms Laboratory (ESSL) in the European Severe Weather Database. For this reason, only publications by ESSL outside of the database are included.

List of case studies on tornadoes and tornado outbreaks during the 2020s
Tornado(es)	Max rating	Summary
2019 Lawrence–Kansas City tornado	EF4	A 2020 study focused on the debris fallout caused by this tornado as it moved over Kansas City International Airport.
2020 Nashville tornado outbreak	N/A	Researchers with Mississippi State University and Indiana University–Purdue University Indianapolis published a case study on how TV stations covered the outbreak.
2020 Nashville tornado	EF3	Researchers with the University of Oklahoma’s CIWRO, the National Severe Storms Laboratory, the University of Maryland, College Park published a case study on the short-term forecasting of this nocturnal tornado.
2020 Cookeville tornado	EF4	Researchers with the University of Oklahoma's CIWRO, the National Severe Storms Laboratory, the University of Maryland, College Park published a case study on the short-term forecasting of this nocturnal tornado.
2020 Cookeville tornado	EF4	Researchers from the University of Oklahoma, Auburn University, and University of Illinois Urbana-Champaign conducted a case study on survivors of the tornado can help future forensic engineering.
2020 Easter tornado outbreak	N/A	Researchers with the University of Oklahoma's CIWRO, the National Severe Storms Laboratory, and National Weather Service forecasting office in Columbia, South Carolina, published a case study on the forecasting of and the aftermath of the second day of the 2020 Easter tornado outbreak, more commonly known as the Central Savannah River outbreak.
2020 Easter tornado outbreak	N/A	Researchers with Mississippi State University and Indiana University–Purdue University Indianapolis published a case study on how TV stations covered the outbreak.
2020 Scarth tornado	CEF3	Researchers with the University of Western Ontario's Northern Tornado Project conducted a case study on this tornado, in which, they estimated the tornado had winds of at least 110–119 metres per second (250–270 mph; 400–430 km/h) based on an analysis of an SUV and a truck thrown by the tornado 50 metres (55 yd) and 100 metres (110 yd) respectively.
2021 South Moravia tornado	IF4	Researchers with the European Severe Storms Laboratory, Czech Hydrometeorological Institute, Slovak Hydrometeorological Institute, Meteopress, Comenius University, and Charles University published a detailed damage survey of the tornado using the brand new International Fujita scale (IF-scale).
2021 South Moravia tornado	IF4	A case study by Simona Hoskovcová, Martina Wolf Čapková, and Štěpán Vymětalon on the "phycological crisis" created by the tornado.
2021 South Moravia tornado	IF4	Researchers with Palacký University Olomouc and the Police Academy of the Czech Republic in Prague published a case study on the tornado.
2021 South Moravia tornado	IF4	Researchers with the Brno University of Technology published a case study on the damage caused by the tornado.
2021 South Moravia tornado	IF4	Researchers with the European Severe Storms Laboratory, Czech Hydrometeorological Institute, Charles University, Meteopress, Slovak Hydrometeorological Institute, Commenius University, Geosphere, Austrocontrol, and Brno University of Technology, published a detailed damage survey of the tornado through the American Meteorological Society using a new version of the International Fujita scale.
Tornado outbreak of 11–13 July 2021	N/A	Researchers with Peking University, China Meteorological Administration Tornado Key Laboratory, Foshan Tornado Research Center, Southern Marine Science and Engineering Guangdong Laboratory, and the China Meteorological Administration published a case study on the tornado outbreak, which was the second-ever record tornado outbreak in Chinese history.
2021 Quad-State Supercell	N/A	Researchers with the University of Nebraska–Lincoln published a detailed case study on the polarimetric radar observations obtained on the 2021 Quad-State Supercell, which produced 11 tornadoes, including two long-track, violent EF4 tornadoes.
2021 Western Kentucky tornado	EF4	A case study by Rebecca Freihaut with the University of Central Florida on how the residents of Mayfield, Kentucky recovered after the tornado.
2021 Western Kentucky tornado	EF4	A case study by researchers from Pennsylvania State University on how historic masonry structures in Mayfield, Kentucky performed during the tornado.
2021 Western Kentucky tornado	EF4	A detailed damage survey and analysis of part of the tornado's track, focusing mainly on Mayfield, Kentucky published by Timothy Marshall, a meteorologist, structural and forensic engineer; Zachary B. Wienhoff, with Haag Engineering Company; Christine L. Wielgos, a meteorologist at the National Weather Service of Paducah; and Brian E. Smith, a meteorologist at the National Weather Service of Omaha. In their conclusion, the researchers state, "the tornado damage rating might have been higher had more wind resistant structures been encountered. Also, the fast forward speed of the tornado had little ‘dwell’ time of strong winds over a building and thus, the damage likely would have been more severe if the tornado were slower."
2022 Arabi–New Orleans tornado	EF3	Researchers with Auburn University, Florida International University, Pennsylvania State University, Louisiana State University, University of South Alabama, University of Illinois Urbana-Champaign, University of Kentucky, and CoreLogic, published an academic case study on how hurricane-resistant houses performed during the tornado.
2023 Rolling Fork–Silver City tornado	EF4	The National Weather Service offices in Jackson, Mississippi and Nashville, Tennessee, along with the National Severe Storms Laboratory and the University of Oklahoma's CIWRO publish a joint damage survey and analysis on the tornado.
2023 Rolling Fork–Silver City tornado	EF4	A case study from researchers with Nanyang Technological University and the University of California on how soil moisture observations led to discrepancies being discovered on the tornado's track vs spotter confirmations vs official damage assessments from the National Weather Service.
2023 Rolling Fork–Silver City tornado	EF4	A case study by researchers from the Microsoft AI for Good Research Lab, Microsoft Philanthropies, and the American Red Cross on how rapid building damage assessment was conducted following the tornado.
2023 Rolling Fork–Silver City tornado	EF4	A case study by researchers with the University of Oklahoma's CIWRO, the National Severe Storms Laboratory, and the Mississippi/Alabama Sea Grant on the tornado.
2023 Black Hawk–Winona tornado	EF3	The National Weather Service offices in Jackson, Mississippi and Nashville, Tennessee, along with the National Severe Storms Laboratory and the University of Oklahoma's CIWRO publish a joint damage survey and analysis on the tornado.
2023 Black Hawk–Winona tornado	EF3	A case study by researchers with the University of Oklahoma's CIWRO, the National Severe Storms Laboratory, and the Mississippi/Alabama Sea Grant on the tornado.
2023 New Wren–Amory tornado	EF3	The National Weather Service offices in Jackson, Mississippi and Nashville, Tennessee, along with the National Severe Storms Laboratory and the University of Oklahoma's CIWRO publish a joint damage survey and analysis on the tornado.
2023 New Wren–Amory tornado	EF3	Researchers with the Oak Ridge National Laboratory conducted a case study and detailed damage survey of the tornado.
2023 New Wren–Amory tornado	EF3	A case study by researchers with the University of Oklahoma's CIWRO, the National Severe Storms Laboratory, and the Mississippi/Alabama Sea Grant on the tornado.
Tornado outbreak of 19–20 April 2023	N/A	The National Weather Service office in Norman, Oklahoma published a detailed damage survey and analysis for tornadoes during the outbreak.
2023 Didsbury tornado	CEF4	Researchers with the University of Western Ontario's Northern Tornado Project conducted a case study on this tornado, in which, they estimated the tornado had winds at least 119 metres per second (270 mph; 430 km/h) based on an analysis of a New Holland TR86 combine harvester that was thrown 100 metres (110 yd) by the tornado.
2023 Jersey tornado	IF3	Researchers with the Tornado and Storm Research Organisation (TORRO), Met Office, and Jersey Met, published a case study on the storm which produced an intense tornado and a hailstorm on the island nation of Jersey.
2024 oThongathi tornado	EF3	The South African Weather Service conducted a nine-day damage survey and case study on the rare tornado.

== See also ==
- History of tornado research
  - Research on tornadoes in 2024
- Meteorology in the 21st century
- Tornadoes of 2020
- Tornadoes of 2021
- Tornadoes of 2022
- Tornadoes of 2023
- Tornadoes of 2024
