= Donelson Christian Academy =

Location
- Nashville, Tennessee; United States; 36.1843503°N 86.6521147°W

Information
- Type: Private
- Motto: "Teach in Truth, Challenge in Community, Lead for the Kingdom"
- Religious affiliation: Christian
- Denomination: Non-denominational
- Established: 1971
- Principal: Natalie Brown (elementary)
- Principal: Brian Case (middle/upper school)
- Head of School: Keith M. Singer
- Teaching staff: 56.1 (as of 2022)
- Gender: Co-ed
- Enrollment: 986 students (as of 2025)
- Colors: Royal Blue and Gold
- Athletics conference: TSSAA - Division II
- Mascot: Wildcats
- Rival: Friendship Christian School
- Accreditations: SACS
- Website: www.dcawildcats.org

Donelson Christian Academy is a private, K-12 Christian school located in the Donelson neighborhood of Nashville, Tennessee.

== History ==
The school was established as segregation academy in response to the court ordered racial integration of public schools. In 1980, headmaster James Lowe said that he founded the school because "public education has changed since bussing."

The school has been the victim of numerous natural disasters. Since its creation, the school has been flooded twice including the 2010 Tennessee floods and experienced significant damage during the March 2020 Tennessee tornado outbreak.

The Academy has undergone various renovations and additions. Over the course of 1976 to the late 1980s, the school replaced their trailer park layout with permanent structures. In 1997, construction started on a new wing that would house a new gym, science classrooms, and sports amenities. In 2002, the second floor was added, housing additional high school classrooms and spaces for fine arts. Following flood damage in 2010, the campus received repairs and updates to classrooms and common areas. In March 2020, the school reconstructed its cafeteria and elementary wing, and additionally added an auditorium. Throughout 2025 and 2026, the 2010s era hallways were modernized.

== Accreditation and Memberships ==
In 1980, Donelson prioritized hiring teachers based on their Christian beliefs, even if they lacked undergraduate degrees. The school's primitive campus, said to resemble a trailer park, precluded accreditation.

Donelson Christian Academy is accredited by the State of Tennessee and the Southern Association of Colleges and Schools. It is a member of the Tennessee Association of Independent Schools and the Association of Christian Schools International.

== Student Activities ==
Donelson Christian Academy has sports teams in softball, baseball, tennis, bowling, volleyball, wrestling, and football. In 2011, its tennis team qualified for the state championship. It sent a male doubles team and a female, both of which brought home medals. In 2012, the boys' basketball team won the state championship. In 2021, 2004, 1996, and 1988, the Division II-A HS football team won the state championship. In 2025, the girls' HS softball team won a state championship.

The school offers fine arts in the forms of band, theatre, visual arts, and choir. DCA also offers their competitive marching band, Wildcat Marching Band, and their show choir, Legacy. The school hosted its first competition, the Music City Show Choir Invitational, in 2020; the contest was held less than a week before the school was hit by a tornado.

== Notable alumni ==
- Nate Bargatze – American stand-up comedian and host of the Nateland Podcast.
- Hillary Scott – Country music singer and songwriter. Co-lead singer of Lady A.
- Chloe Kohanski – American rock singer and songwriter. Winner of season 13 of The Voice
