= Nocturnal tornado =

Tornadoes that occur at night

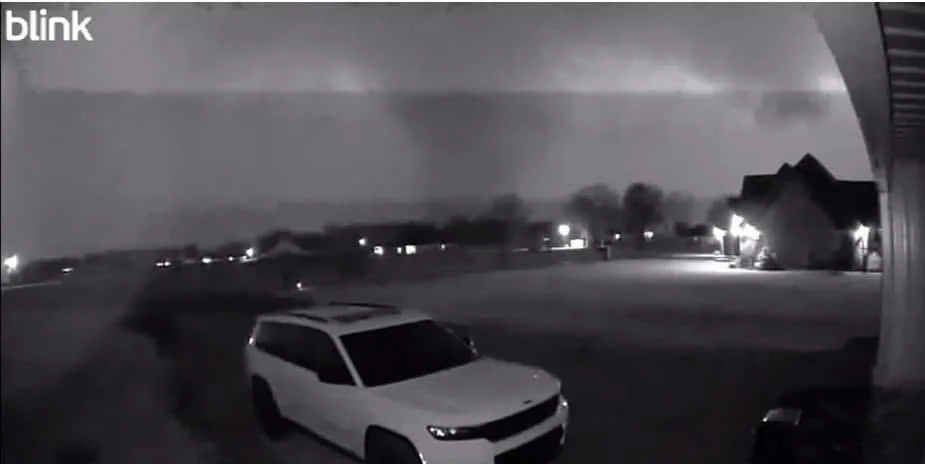
An EF4 tornado in Diaz, Arkansas on March 14, 2025.

A nocturnal tornado, also known as a nighttime or overnight tornado, is a tornado that occurs during nighttime. Nocturnal tornadoes are about twice as likely to be fatal as daytime tornadoes. These tornadoes usually occur in the Deep South areas of the United States, particularly in the southeast.

== Appearance and lethality ==
Nocturnal tornadoes appear similar to their daytime counterparts but are pitch black due to the absence of light. Their silhouettes can only be seen during a lightning strike or a power flash.

These tornadoes are most commonly either rain-wrapped or a smaller condensation funnel. More violent or destructive tornadoes tend to be large wedge tornadoes like the 2021 Western Kentucky EF4 or the 2007 Greensburg, Kansas EF5.

Due to the lack of visibility, these types of tornadoes are more lethal than daytime tornadoes, although early advanced warning systems and tornado sirens can help reduce the amount of fatalities a specific tornado can have. Some of the worst tornadoes have occurred at night.

== Notable examples ==
Notable violent nocturnal tornadoes

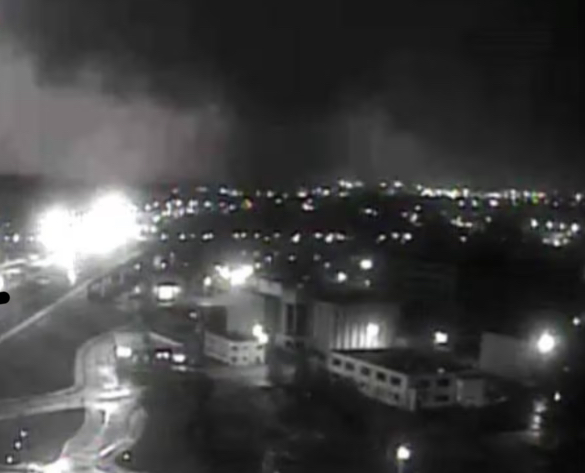
A violent EF4 tornado in Dayton, Ohio on May 27, 2019.

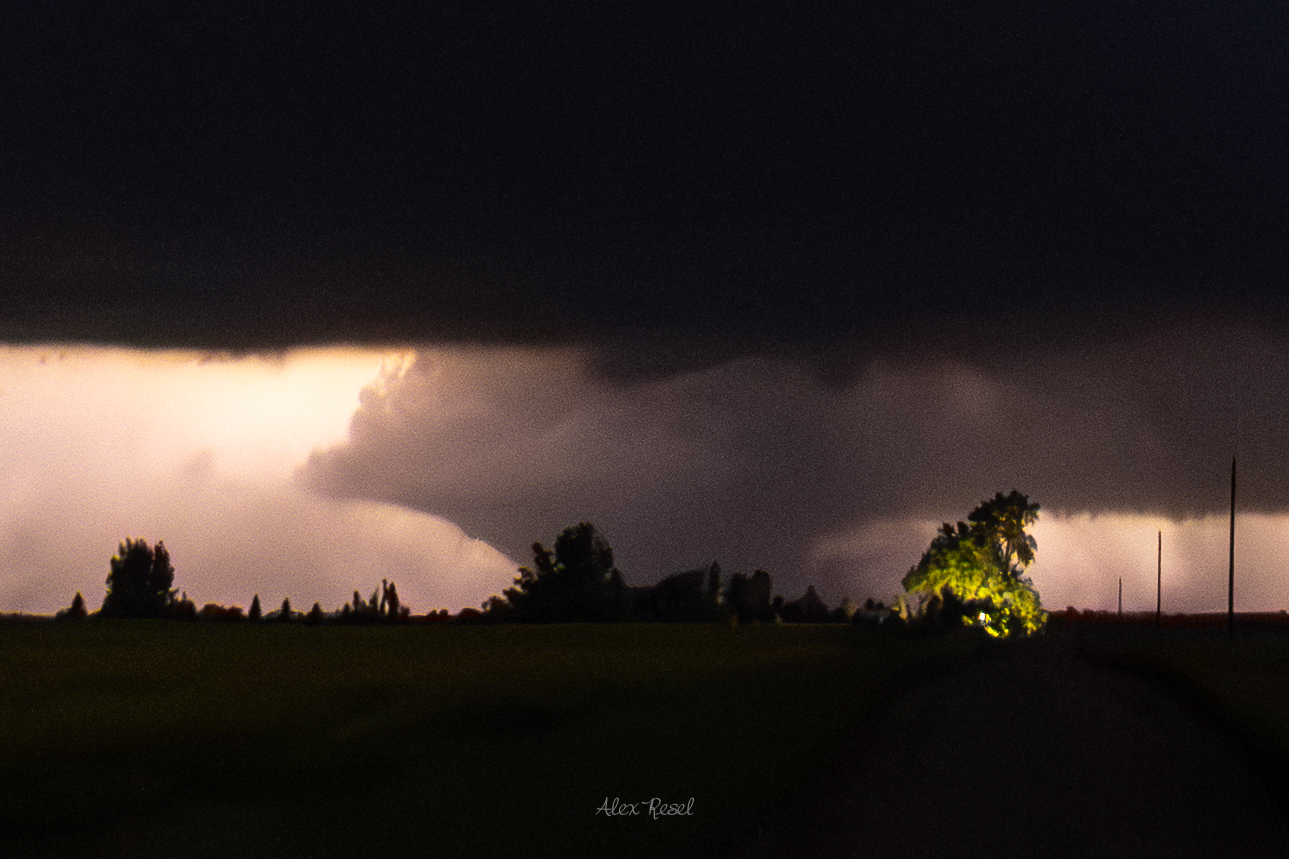
An extremely violent EF5 tornado near Enderlin, North Dakota on June 20, 2025.

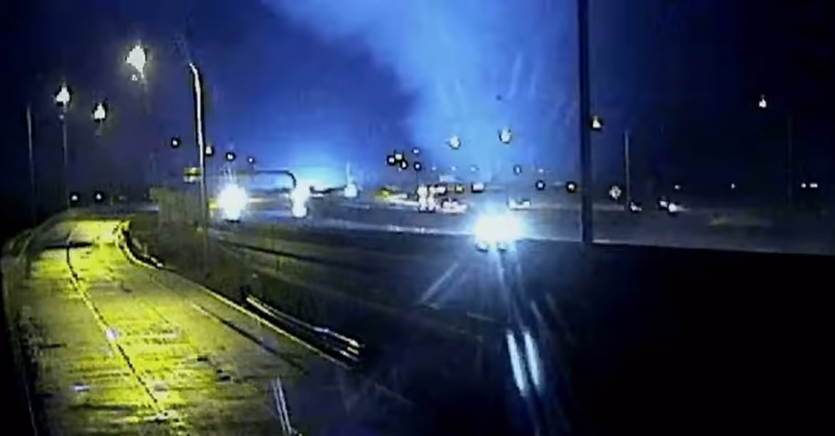
The 2015 Garland EF4 tornado illuminated by power flashes.

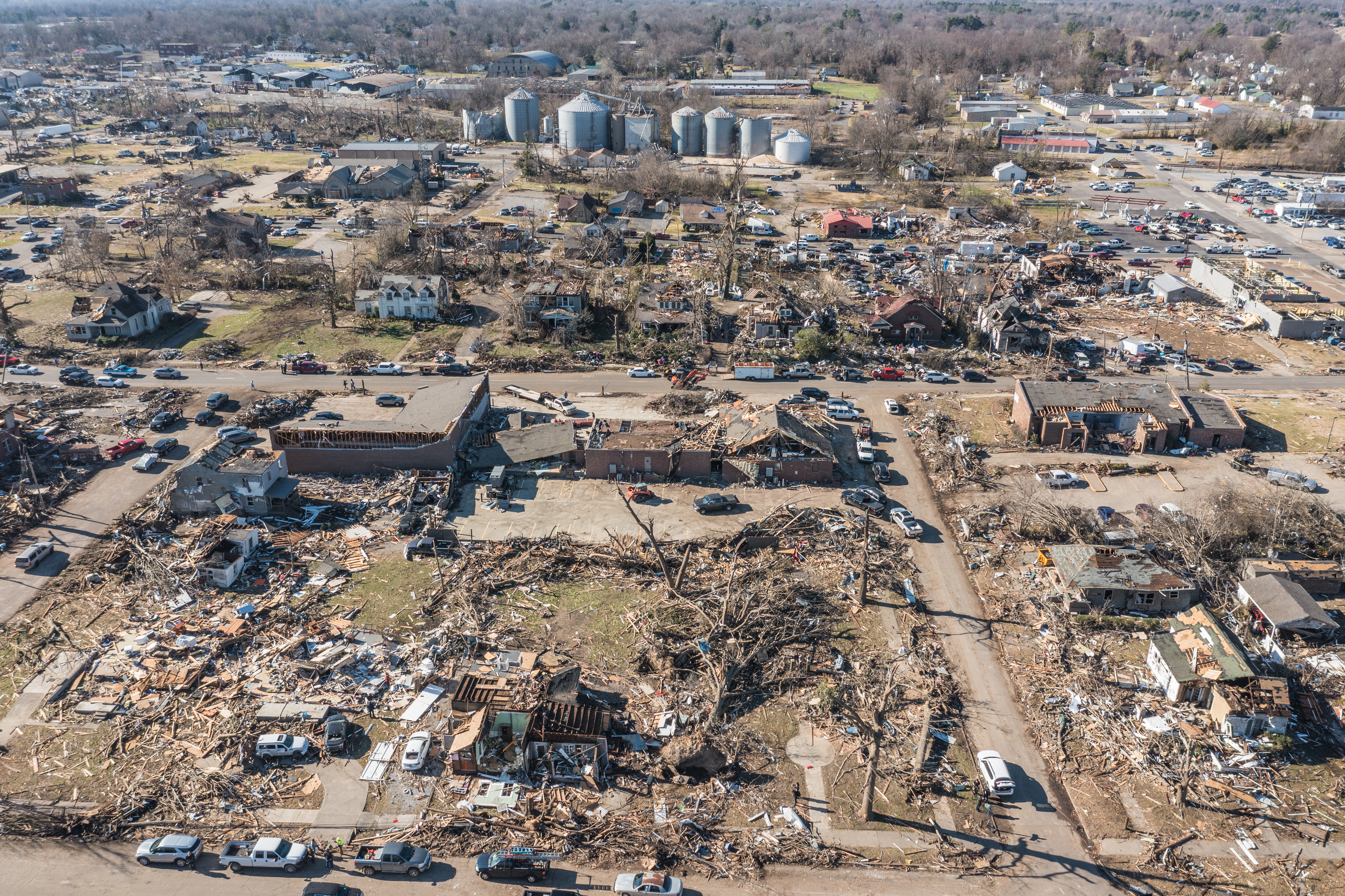
Downtown Mayfield after a destructive EF4 tornado tore through town.

Dozens of notable examples of nocturnal tornadoes have occurred. The 1953 Flint–Beecher tornado, an F5 tornado, killed 116 people. During the 1955 Great Plains tornado outbreak, two F5 tornadoes killed 100 people in total near the Oklahoma and Kansas border. On June 8th 1966, during the tornado outbreak sequence of June 1966, an F5 tornado tore through the suburban areas of Topeka, Kansas, killing 16 people. In 1987, the 1987 Saragosa tornado (an F4 tornado) killed 30 in Saragosa, Texas. In 1991, a weak but significant waterspout tracked near Lake Okeechobee. A photograph, captured by Fred Smith of this tornado showing the funnel beside a lightning strike became one of the most famous images captured of a tornado.

In 2007, the Greensburg tornado destroyed nearly all structures in Greensburg, Kansas killing 11, and was the first tornado rated EF5 since the implementation of the Enhanced Fujita scale. During the 2008 Super Tuesday tornado outbreak, multiple violent tornadoes occurred after dark. In December of 2015, the 2015 Garland tornado tore through the Dallas suburban areas into Garland and Rowlett, killing 10.

In March of 2020, two notable and violent tornadoes hit Tennessee at night. The 2020 Nashville tornado hit Nashville at EF3 strength, and the other tornado during the 2020 Nashville tornado outbreak caused EF4 damage to the residences of Cookeville. During the tornado outbreak of December 10–11, 2021, several intense and violent tornadoes hit the eastern United States. Most notably, the 2021 Monette-Samburg tornado went through three states, including Arkansas, Missouri, and Tennessee. The 2021 Western Kentucky EF4 tore through several communities in Kentucky, most notably in downtown Mayfield, killing 57. The 2021 Bowling Green tornadoes went through Bowling Green, Kentucky, killing 17. In early 2023, the 2023 Rolling Fork–Silver City tornado (a high-end EF4 similar to the Mayfield tornado) struck the communities of Rolling Fork, Mississippi and Silver City in Mississippi, killing 17

In 2024, the 2024 Barnsdall–Bartlesville tornado, a nocturnal wedge, ripped through Barnsdall, Oklahoma, killing two, During the Tornado outbreak of March 13–16, 2025, several violent tornadoes, notably the Diaz and Fifty-Six Arkansas tornadoes tracked at night. On May 16th 2025, the 2025 Somerset-London tornado during the tornado outbreak of May 15–16, 2025 tracked through the communities of Somerset and London in Kentucky, killing 19, making it the deadliest tornado since the 2023 Rolling Fork EF4. On June 20, 2025, the first EF5 tornado since 2013 occurred at nighttime near Enderlin, North Dakota, killing 3.

== See also ==
- Multiple-vortex tornado
- Tornado
