= Cognia (education) =

U.S. pre-university accreditation organization

- Company type: Non-profit organization
- Founded: April 2, 2006; 20 years ago
- Headquarters: Alpharetta, Georgia; Tempe, Arizona
- Website: www.cognia.org

Cognia is a non-profit, non-governmental organization that accredits primary and secondary schools throughout the United States and internationally.

== History ==
Cognia was formed as AdvancED in 2006 by the consolidation of the pre-college divisions of two of the U.S. regional accreditation organizations: the Commission on Accreditation and School Improvement of the North Central Association of Colleges and Schools, and the Council on Accreditation and School Improvement of the Southern Association of Colleges and Schools. In 2012 the Northwest Accreditation Commission joined AdvancED. AdvancED merged with Measured Progress in 2018, and the organization rebranded as Cognia in 2019.

Cognia has standards and processes that conform to conditions specific to Charter School Authorizers, Corporations, Digital Learning, Early Learning, Education Service Agencies, Postsecondary Schools, Special Purpose, and Systems.

== Membership ==
Cognia reported that it served more than 36,000 institutions globally with a total of 25 million students and 1 million educators in about 80 counties.
