= Western Express, Inc. =

American truckload carrier

- Type: Private
- Industry: Truckload transport carrier
- Founded: 1991
- Founder: Wayne & Donna Wise
- Headquarters: Nashville, Tennessee, U.S.
- Website: www.westernexp.com

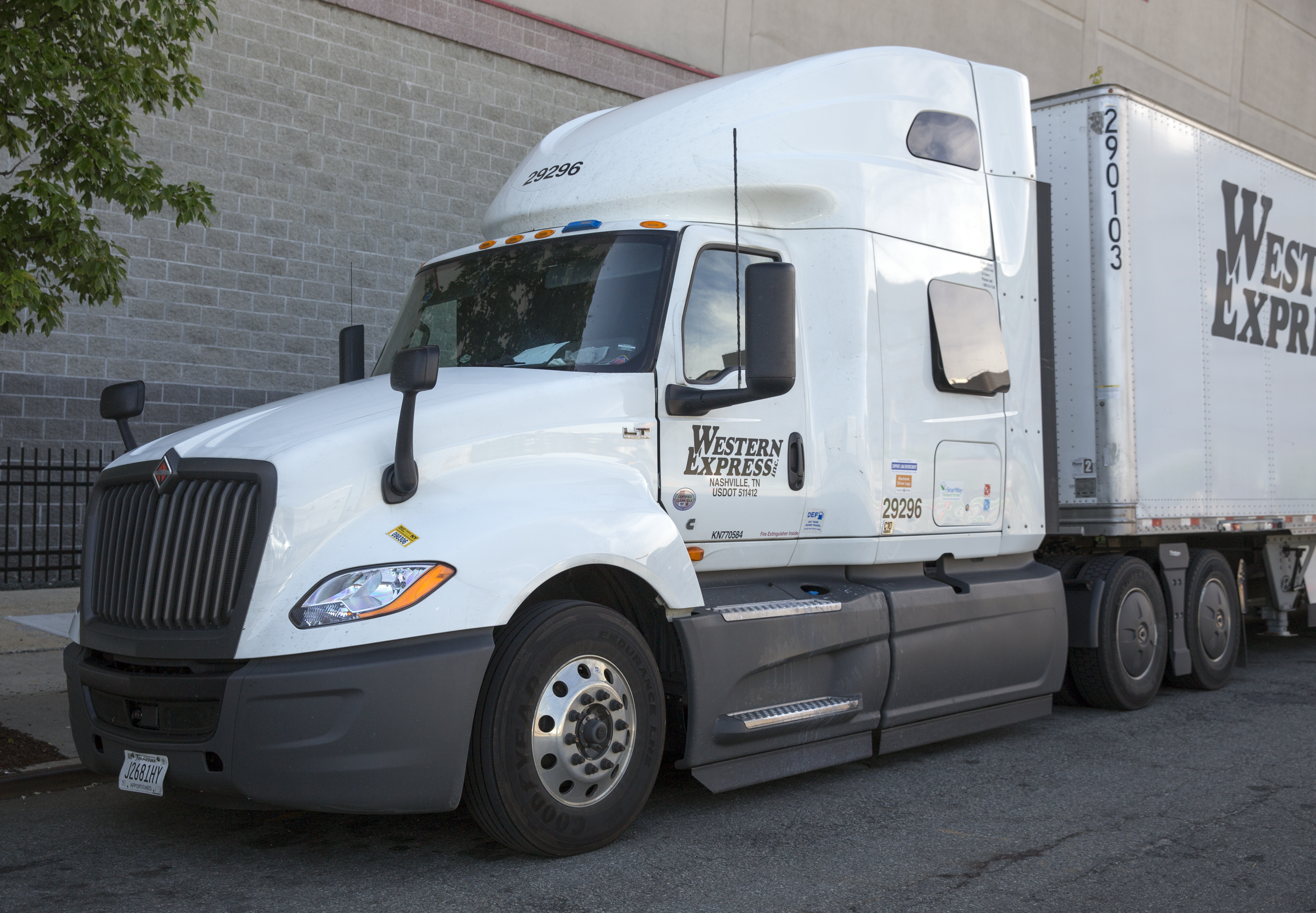
A Western Express truck in Brooklyn, New York, in 2019

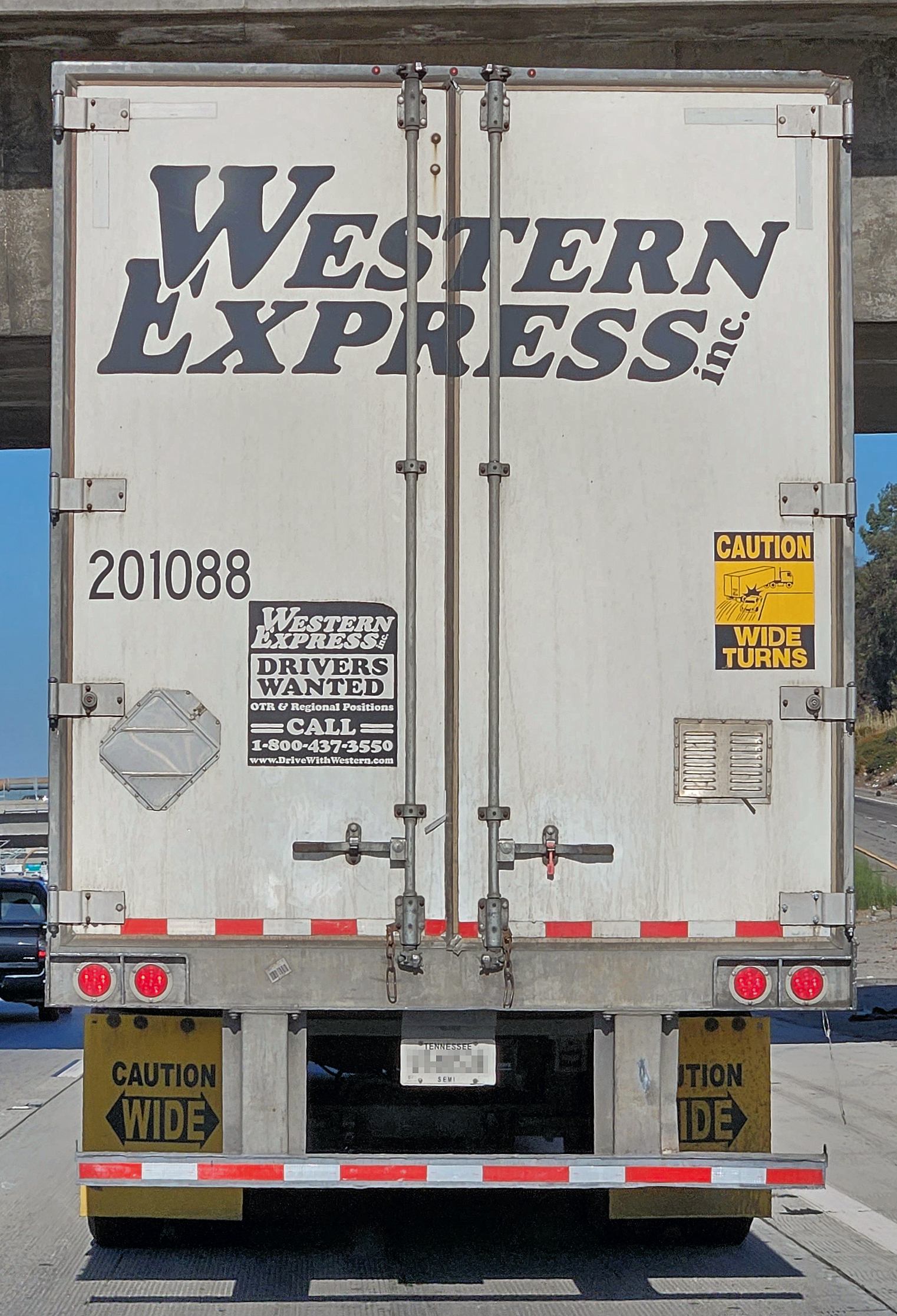
Rear view of a Western Express trailer in 2023

Western Express, Inc. is an American transportation and logistics company based in Nashville, Tennessee. It is a privately owned company founded in 1991.

== History ==
In 2014, the company sued the truck stop Pilot Flying J regarding the truck stop's handling of fuel rebates for Western Express, while several other companies also had their lawsuits against the truck stop.

In 2019, the company began expanding by creating headquarters jobs and hiring drivers, an $88 million investment over five years. Western Express hired 350 drivers each year of the five-year plan as part of this plan.

In 2020 the Nashville terminal was extensively damaged in the 2020 Nashville tornado outbreak.

== Operations ==
The company has grown and has over 2000 trucks and 6000 trailers as of 2024. Most company trucks are the Freightliner Cascadia or International LT models.

As of 2018, Western Express was a top-25 carrier in the United States based on revenue.

== Divisions ==
- Van (truckload)
- Flatbed
- Regional
- Dedicated routes (Sauve)

== Terminal locations ==
- Plainfield, Connecticut
- Bethlehem, Pennsylvania
- Richmond, Virginia
- Nashville, Tennessee (Headquarters)
- Laredo, Texas
- Bloomington, California
