= Tornado outbreak of March 2–3, 2020 =

Severe weather event in the United States

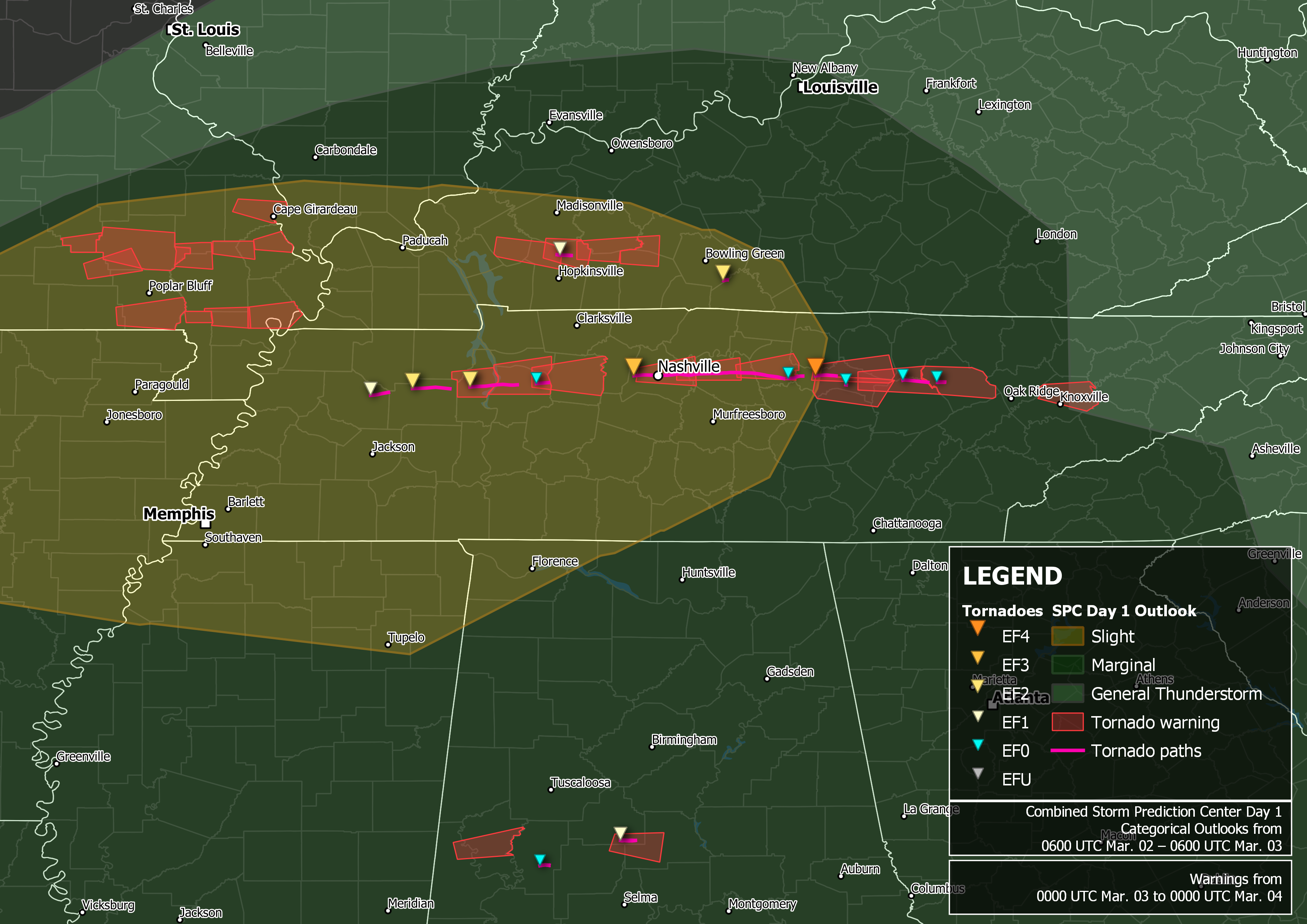
- Confirmed tornadoes received by the Storm Prediction Center as well as all the tornado warnings issued.

Meteorological history
- Date: March 2–3, 2020
- Duration: 10 hours, 38 minutes

Tornado outbreak
- Tornadoes: 15
- Max. rating: EF4 tornado
- Highest winds: 175 mph (282 km/h) tornadic (Cookeville, TN EF4)

Overall effects
- Fatalities: 25 (+1 indirect)
- Injuries: 309
- Damage: $1.607 billion (2020 USD)
- Areas affected: Tennessee, Alabama, Southern Kentucky, Southeastern Missouri
- Power outages: 73,000
- Part of the tornado outbreaks of 2020

A small but deadly tornado outbreak affected West and Middle Tennessee on the night of March 2 and into the morning of March 3, 2020, including a high-end EF3 tornado that hit Nashville and Mount Juliet, becoming the 6th costliest tornado in United States history, and a violent EF4 tornado that impacted areas in and just west of Cookeville. A total of 25 people were killed by the tornadoes, with an additional 309 being injured, and more than 70,000 lost electricity. The path of the Nashville tornado was very similar to the one that hit East Nashville in 1998. A few additional tornadoes were also confirmed in Alabama, southeastern Missouri, and western Kentucky. Total damage from the event reached $1.607 billion according to the National Centers for Environmental Information.

== Meteorological synopsis ==
The threat for severe weather across Middle Tennessee and surrounding areas was poorly forecasted in advance. The Storm Prediction Center (SPC) first issued a slight risk across northeastern Arkansas into the Tennessee Valley area in their 1:00 a.m. CST (06:00 UTC) March 2 outlook. In their forecast, the SPC noted that an unstable atmosphere was likely to materialize ahead of an approaching cold front, but that this environment would likely be contained by a capping inversion for most of the day.

By the afternoon hours, the SPC expected the combination of rich moisture, modest wind shear, and cold mid-level temperatures to promote the formation of supercells with a primary risk of large hail. Some tornadic activity appeared possible overnight given an increase in low-level winds. At 5:20 p.m. CST, the first tornado watch was issued from northern Arkansas northeastward into southern Indiana and western Kentucky as discrete storms began to develop.

By 11:00 p.m. CST, as a surface low progressed northeastward through southern Missouri, sustained barometric pressure falls caused supercell storms to give way to an organized storm cluster that gradually weakened as it progressed into an area of less abundant moisture. As convection weakened to the north, the SPC began to monitor areas farther south – encompassing eastern Arkansas, West Tennessee, and southwestern Kentucky – for reinvigorated thunderstorm development as the northern jet stream amplified southeastward into the risk area. Strong wind shear coupled with low instability was expected to promote activity with "a risk for severe hail, strong surface gusts and perhaps potential for a tornado or two." At 11:20 p.m. CST, a localized tornado watch was issued across Middle Tennessee. In subsequent hours, a long-lived and intense supercell produced ten tornadoes along the Interstate 40 corridor. A few hours after the Tennessee event, as severe weather moved farther south, a couple weaker tornadoes touched down in central Alabama as the outbreak wound down.

=== Tennessee supercell ===
At 10:12 p.m. CST, the first tornado produced by the supercell touched down in Gibson County in West Tennessee. This tornado was rated EF1 and was followed minutes later by a stronger and longer-tracked EF2 tornado which traveled across much of Carroll County. A tornado warning was not issued for the first two tornadoes; the first tornado warning was issued prior to the development of third tornado. After causing minor to moderate damage with these two tornadoes, the supercell quickly produced a third tornado, also rated EF2, that touched down north of Camden in Benton County. This tornado produced significant damage along a nearly 19-mile (31 km) path, killing one person in Benton County before crossing Kentucky Lake into Humphreys County in Middle Tennessee. It continued to produce damage until dissipating just north of Waverly at 11:31 p.m. CST. A fourth tornado, rated EF0, caused sporadic damage minutes later in the McEwen area.

Outbreak death toll
State	Fatalities	County	Fatalities
Tennessee	25	Benton	1
Tennessee	25	Davidson	2
Tennessee	25	Putnam	19
Tennessee	25	Wilson	3

Upon crossing into Dickson County, the supercell began to weaken somewhat, with a marked decrease in rotation as the cell moved through Dickson and into Cheatham County. However, very large hail was reported in the Charlotte area as the cell passed through. After passing just north of Pegram, the supercell immediately began showing signs of better organization as a well-defined hook echo reappeared on radar. Just after entering Davidson County, the fifth tornado associated with the cell commenced at 12:32 a.m. CST, approximately 7 miles (11 km) northeast of Pegram. A tornado warning was issued for Downtown Nashville three minutes later as the tornado crossed the Cumberland River and impacted the John C. Tune Airport, as well as the nearby headquarters and terminal of truckload carrier Western Express, Inc. It would go on to produce widespread EF2 to high-end EF3 damage in the communities of North Nashville, Germantown, East Nashville, Donelson, Hermitage, and Mount Juliet while traveling 60.13 miles (96.77 km) through Davidson, Wilson, and Smith counties, also causing heavy damage in Lebanon and Gordonsville. Five people were killed by the tornado, two in East Nashville and three near Mount Juliet, and 220 people were injured. After lifting, a sixth tornado, rated EF0, was quickly produced along the Smith–Putnam county line. It moved across areas north of Buffalo Valley, dissipating as it tried to ascend the Highland Rim.

The seventh tornado was a violent EF4 tornado that caused catastrophic damage in Putnam County near Baxter and in the western part of Cookeville, resulting in 19 deaths and 87 injuries. It touched down northwest of Baxter at 1:48 a.m. CST, just as a tornado warning was issued for the area. The tornado moved toward the Double Springs community and quickly intensified. Producing a narrow swath of EF3 to EF4-strength damage, the tornado moved along U.S. 70N, causing catastrophic damage in neighborhoods along the path. The tornado abruptly dissipated just before reaching downtown Cookeville after a path of nearly 8.4 miles (13.5 km). This abrupt dissipation was due in part to a southern circulation developing within the cell to the south of Interstate 40, which later resulted in the eighth tornado, a brief EF0, southeast of Cookeville in Goffton.

As the northern circulation dissipated over Overton County, the southern circulation became dominant as the supercell climbed the Cumberland Plateau into Cumberland County. An EF2 tornado, the ninth from the cell, began near Rinnie, north of Crossville, and moved east into the Catoosa Wildlife Management Area, producing extensive tree damage. After apparent dissipation in wilderness near the Cumberland–Morgan county border, a tenth tornado—rated EF0—produced minor damage a few miles east, just to the west of Lancing in East Tennessee. The final tornado produced by the cell dissipated at 3:40 a.m. EST (2:40 a.m. CST), four and a half hours after the first tornado in Gibson County.

== Confirmed tornadoes ==
Confirmed tornadoes by Enhanced Fujita rating
EFU	EF0	EF1	EF2	EF3	EF4	EF5	Total
0	6	3	4	1	1	0	15

=== March 2 event ===
List of confirmed tornadoes – Monday, March 2, 2020 (Note: All dates are based on the local time zone where the tornado touched down; however, all times are in Coordinated Universal Time for consistency.)
EF#	Location	County / Parish	State	Start Coord.	Time (UTC)	Path length	Max width
EF1	SW of Crofton to NW of Fruit Hill	Christian	KY	37.0335°N 87.5005°W	02:00–02:06	5.51 mi (8.87 km)	400 yd (370 m)
EF1	A meteorologist observed this tornado, which crossed U.S. Route 41 just south of Crofton. Four farm structures and two garages were either damaged or destroyed, and several homes sustained minor roof, window, and siding damage. Numerous trees were uprooted along the path.						
EF1	Idlewide to NW of Trezevant	Gibson	TN	36.0323°N 88.8275°W	04:12–04:23	7.27 mi (11.70 km)	100 yd (91 m)
EF1	The first tornado produced by the long-tracked Nashville supercell damaged several homes and grain bins south of Bradford. Trees were downed as well. A tornado warning was not issued for this tornado.						
EF0	ESE of Broadwater to W of Risco	New Madrid	MO	36.57°N 89.9°W	04:15–04:18	3.06 mi (4.92 km)	50 yd (46 m)
EF0	A narrow tornado was on the ground approximately three minutes, and was confirmed by chaser via photograph. The tornado remained over an open field and produced no damage.						
EF2	S of McKenzie to N of Hollow Rock	Carroll	TN	36.0811°N 88.5287°W	04:41–04:57	14.8 mi (23.8 km)	100 yd (91 m)
EF2	The second tornado from the Nashville supercell moved due east across Carroll County. Homes, barns, and grain bins were damaged or destroyed along the path. A few of these homes had their roofs torn off, and one sustained collapse of its exterior walls. Numerous trees were downed as well. A tornado warning was not issued for this tornado.						
EF2	NNW of Camden to N of Waverly	Benton, Humphreys	TN	36.0928°N 88.1189°W	05:05–05:31	18.72 mi (30.13 km)	250 yd (230 m)
EF2	1 death – Several homes sustained significant damage, some of which sustained roof loss and some collapse of exterior walls. A mobile home was destroyed, and multiple outbuildings were either damaged or destroyed as well. Hundreds of trees were downed along the path, especially as the tornado crossed the Kentucky Lake into Humphreys County. Two people were also injured in Benton County. This was the third tornado from the long-tracked Nashville supercell.						
EF0	McEwen to NNE of Few Chapel	Humphreys	TN	36.1162°N 87.6482°W	05:42–05:48	4.8 mi (7.7 km)	50 yd (46 m)
EF0	This tornado, the fourth tornado from the Nashville supercell, touched down just northwest of McEwen and moved off to the east, damaging a small barn and causing roof damage to a house. Several trees were downed along the path.						

=== March 3 event ===
List of confirmed tornadoes – Tuesday, March 3, 2020
EF#	Location	County / Parish	State	Start Coord.	Time (UTC)	Path length	Max width
EF2	N of Allen Springs to SSW of Raley Ford	Warren, Allen	KY	36.8500°N 86.3200°W	06:15–06:18	2.7 mi (4.3 km)	250 yd (230 m)
EF2	A brief, but strong low-end EF2 tornado embedded within a larger area of straight-line wind damage destroyed three barns, and caused significant roof and siding damage to two houses southeast of Alvaton. A horse trailer was thrown 70 yards (64 m), and over 500 trees were knocked down in all directions.						
EF3	W of Nashville to Lebanon to SE of Gordonsville	Davidson, Wilson, Smith	TN	36.1717°N 86.9562°W	06:32–07:35	60.13 mi (96.77 km)	1,600 yd (1,500 m)
EF3	5 deaths – See article on this tornado – The fifth tornado from the long-tracked Nashville supercell, this was the 6th costliest tornado in United States history with $1.504 billion in damage. 220 people were injured.						
EF0	NNW of Buffalo Valley to S of Gentry	Putnam	TN	36.1603°N 85.8056°W	07:38–07:42	3.32 mi (5.34 km)	50 yd (46 m)
EF0	The sixth tornado produced by the Nashville supercell touched down three minutes after the Nashville EF3 tornado lifted and moved across hilly terrain just north of Buffalo Valley. It caused roof damage to several homes in the St. Mary's and Rock Springs communities of Putnam County before dissipating near the Buffalo Valley Dragway. Several outbuildings were damaged and numerous trees were downed as well.						
EF4	NW of Baxter to Cookeville	Putnam	TN	36.1716°N 85.6618°W	07:48–07:56	8.39 mi (13.50 km)	900 yd (820 m)
EF4	19 deaths – See article on this tornado – This was the seventh tornado from the long-tracked Nashville supercell. 87 people were injured.						
EF0	Goffton	Putnam	TN	36.1075°N 85.4461°W	08:05–08:06	0.23 mi (0.37 km)	25 yd (23 m)
EF0	The eighth tornado from the Nashville supercell briefly touched down along U.S. Route 70N in the Dry Valley area southeast of Cookeville and caused roof damage to a house, a metal garage, and an outbuilding. Several trees had large branches broken as well.						
EF2	SW of Rinnie to NNE of Fairfield Glade	Cumberland, Morgan	TN	36.1399°N 85.0401°W	08:25–08:35	10.07 mi (16.21 km)	500 yd (460 m)
EF2	This was the ninth tornado produced by the Nashville supercell. It touched down along U.S. Route 127, causing roof damage to a mobile home. It then destroyed two outbuildings, caused roof damage to two homes, and pushed over a power pole. Two more outbuildings were destroyed before the tornado continued into the Catoosa Wildlife Management Area, where extensive tree damage warranted a low-end EF2 rating. The tornado weakened as it approached the Morgan County border and dissipated in Morgan County.						
EF0	W of Lancing	Morgan	TN	36.1264°N 84.799°W	08:40–08:42	3.68 mi (5.92 km)	200 yd (180 m)
EF0	The tenth and final tornado produced by the Nashville supercell snapped or uprooted numerous trees and flipped a metal carport.						
EF0	S of Greensboro	Hale	AL	32.6846°N 87.6226°W	12:04–12:12	4.34 mi (6.98 km)	220 yd (200 m)
EF0	A high-end EF0 tornado snapped or uprooted numerous trees along its path. Some homes suffered damage to shingles and siding, as well as some minor structural damage.						
EF1	Lawley	Bibb	AL	32.8648°N 87.0496°W	12:28–12:38	6.21 mi (9.99 km)	525 yd (480 m)
EF1	A high-end EF1 tornado blew a manufactured home off its foundation, displaced a vehicle, and snapped or uprooted several dozen trees. A few houses were damaged, and more trees were downed in a wooded area and near the Lawley Fire Department and Community Center.						

=== Nashville–Mount Juliet–Lebanon–Gordonsville, Tennessee ===
Nashville–Mount Juliet–Lebanon–Gordonsville, Tennessee
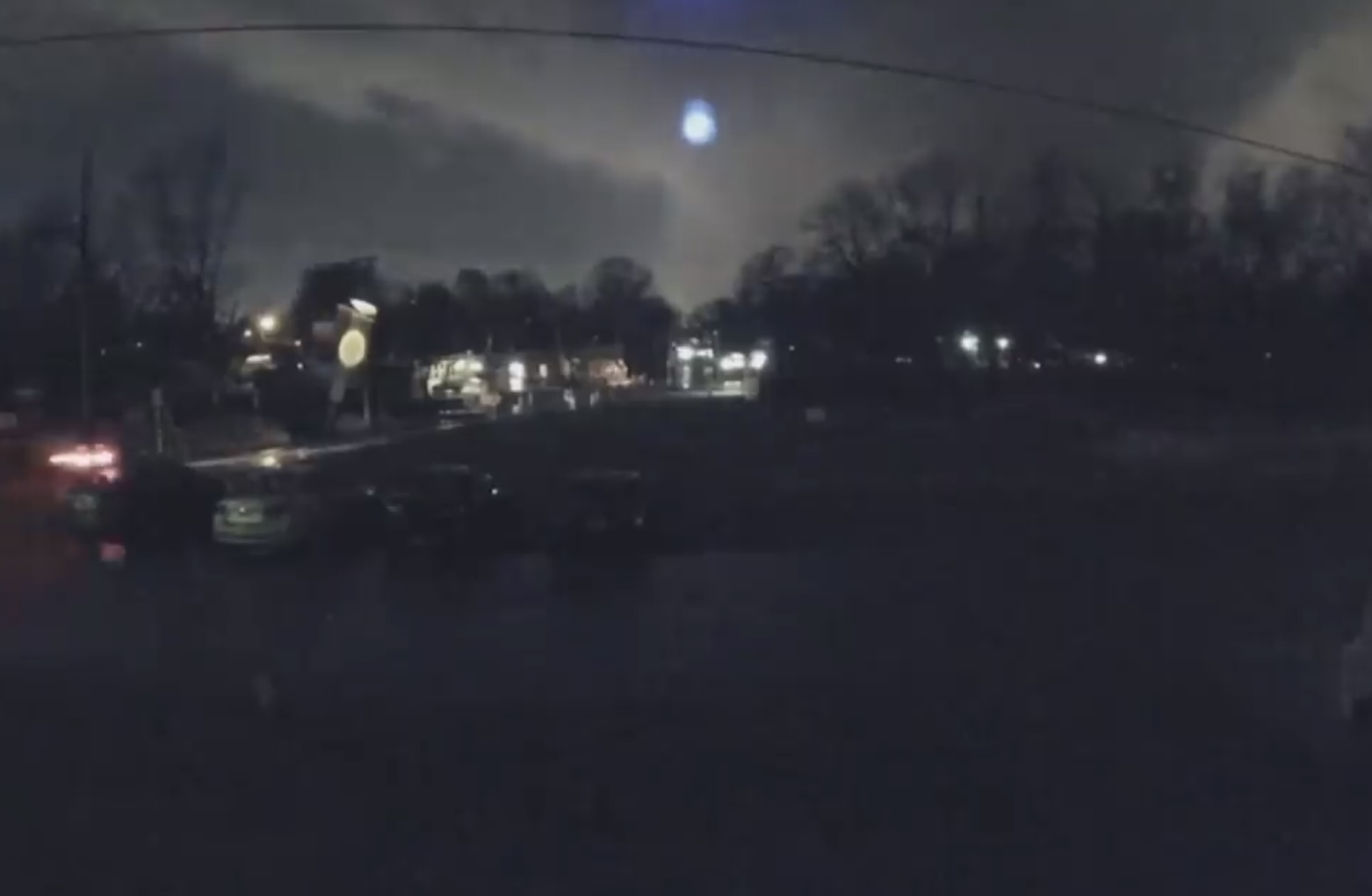
- The tornado captured by a CCTV camera.

Meteorological history
- Formed: March 3, 2020, 12:32 a.m. CST (UTC−06:00)
- Dissipated: March 3, 2020, 1:35 a.m. CST (UTC−06:00)
- Duration: 1 hour, 3 minutes

EF3 tornado
- on the Enhanced Fujita scale
- Highest winds: 165 mph (266 km/h)

Overall effects
- Casualties: 5 fatalities, 220 injuries
- Damage: $1.504 billion (2020 USD) (6th costliest tornado in US history)

This deadly and very destructive high-end EF3 tornado touched down around 12:32 a.m. CST (06:32 UTC) in far western Davidson County along River Road, 7 miles (11 km) northeast of Pegram. Initially, just trees were downed as the tornado crossed the Cumberland River and moved through Bells Bend, where a barn was also destroyed. Damage along this initial segment of the path was rated EF0 to EF1. The tornado crossed the river a second time before heavily damaging the John C. Tune Airport and an industrial area along Centennial Boulevard, including a terminal and the headquarters of Western Express, Inc. at high-end EF2 strength. The airport sustained significant damage to its terminal and other buildings, with 17 metal hangars on the property destroyed. More than 90 aircraft parked at the airport, including charter jets, smaller airplanes, and a news helicopter operated by CBS affiliate WTVF were destroyed. Maintaining high-end EF2 strength, it crossed Briley Parkway and struck the former Tennessee State Prison, which sustained considerable structural damage. It soon crossed the river again and struck the northern part of the Tennessee State University campus at EF2 intensity.

The tornado grew to nearly two-thirds of a mile (1.1 km) wide as it crossed Interstate 65 and moved into Germantown, just north of the Tennessee State Capitol, where it produced a widespread swath of mid to high-end EF2 damage. Throughout Germantown, numerous homes, churches, and apartment buildings sustained significant structural damage, including several large, multi-story apartment buildings that had their roofs and upper-floor exterior walls ripped off. An O'Reilly Auto Parts store was damaged and an AutoZone was almost completely destroyed.

It then crossed Interstate 24 at Spring Street and produced major EF3-strength damage in East Nashville, crossing the path of the April 16, 1998, F3 tornado in the Five Points neighborhood. Numerous businesses, restaurants, bars, homes, and apartment buildings were damaged or destroyed in Five Points, including Basement East, a popular music venue, which sustained major structural damage. A YMCA was badly damaged, and a Dollar General store was completely destroyed. Two fatalities occurred in Five Points when two pedestrians were struck by debris. The tornado continued through neighborhoods east of Five Points, causing EF2 damage to numerous homes, churches, and multi-story brick buildings. The tornado soon moved into Donelson, crossing the Stones River twice and destroying much of Donelson Christian Academy and the Stanford Estates subdivision as it rapidly re-intensified. Numerous homes at Stanford Estates were destroyed and vehicles were thrown and mangled, and a few homes in this subdivision were leveled at high-end EF3 strength. Kroger, Panera Bread, and Petco, in addition to multiple apartment buildings, sustained considerable damage along Old Hickory Boulevard to the west. The tornado maintained EF2 strength as it paralleled Interstate 40 into Wilson County.

The tornado moved through Mount Juliet, producing a large swath of high-end EF3 damage as it crossed North Mount Juliet Road and substantially damaged Mount Juliet Christian Academy, West Wilson Middle School, and Stoner Creek Elementary. Numerous homes throughout town were heavily damaged or destroyed, a few of which were completely leveled. Two fatalities occurred in western Mount Juliet along Catalpa Drive. Maintaining EF3 intensity along a six-mile (9.7 km) swath, the tornado continued east of Mount Juliet along the north side of Interstate 40 towards Lebanon, causing severe damage in residential, commercial, and industrial areas between the two cities.

The last area of EF3-strength damage was observed to warehouses along Eastgate Boulevard before the tornado weakened to EF2 intensity, producing more damage across Highway 109 and along Leeville Pike and Tuckers Gap Road. Extensive tree damage occurred in this area, and multiple well-built homes had their roofs ripped off, a few of which had some exterior walls collapse. In Lebanon, many homes and businesses suffered considerable damage, including two large cemeteries, Lebanon Municipal Airport, Walmart, and Lowe's, as the tornado crossed South Hartmann Drive, South Maple Street, and South Cumberland Street (U.S. 231). As the tornado passed Linwood Road, a gas station and a heavy equipment auctioneer's property sustained low-end EF2 damage. The gas station had a canopy blown over and a couple exterior walls knocked down.

Continuing into Smith County, the tornado produced EF1-type damage in the Grant and New Middleton communities, snapping and uprooting many trees, damaging or destroying barns and outbuildings, and causing considerable roof damage to homes. The tornado dipped south of the interstate at New Middleton, continuing to damage houses and destroy outbuildings as it crossed ridges and valleys through southern Gordonsville, with most of the damage occurring on Agee Branch Road, Hickman Highway, and Maple Street. More tree and structural damage was observed as the tornado left Gordonsville at EF1 intensity before it lifted east-northeast of Hickman along Lancaster Highway at 1:35 a.m. CST (07:35 UTC). The tornado caused 5 fatalities and 220 injuries along the 60.13-mile (96.77 km) path, which is one of the longest continuous damage paths in Tennessee history. Damage estimates from the tornado reached $1.504 billion, making it the 6th costliest tornado in United States history.

=== Baxter–Cookeville, Tennessee ===
Baxter–Cookeville, Tennessee
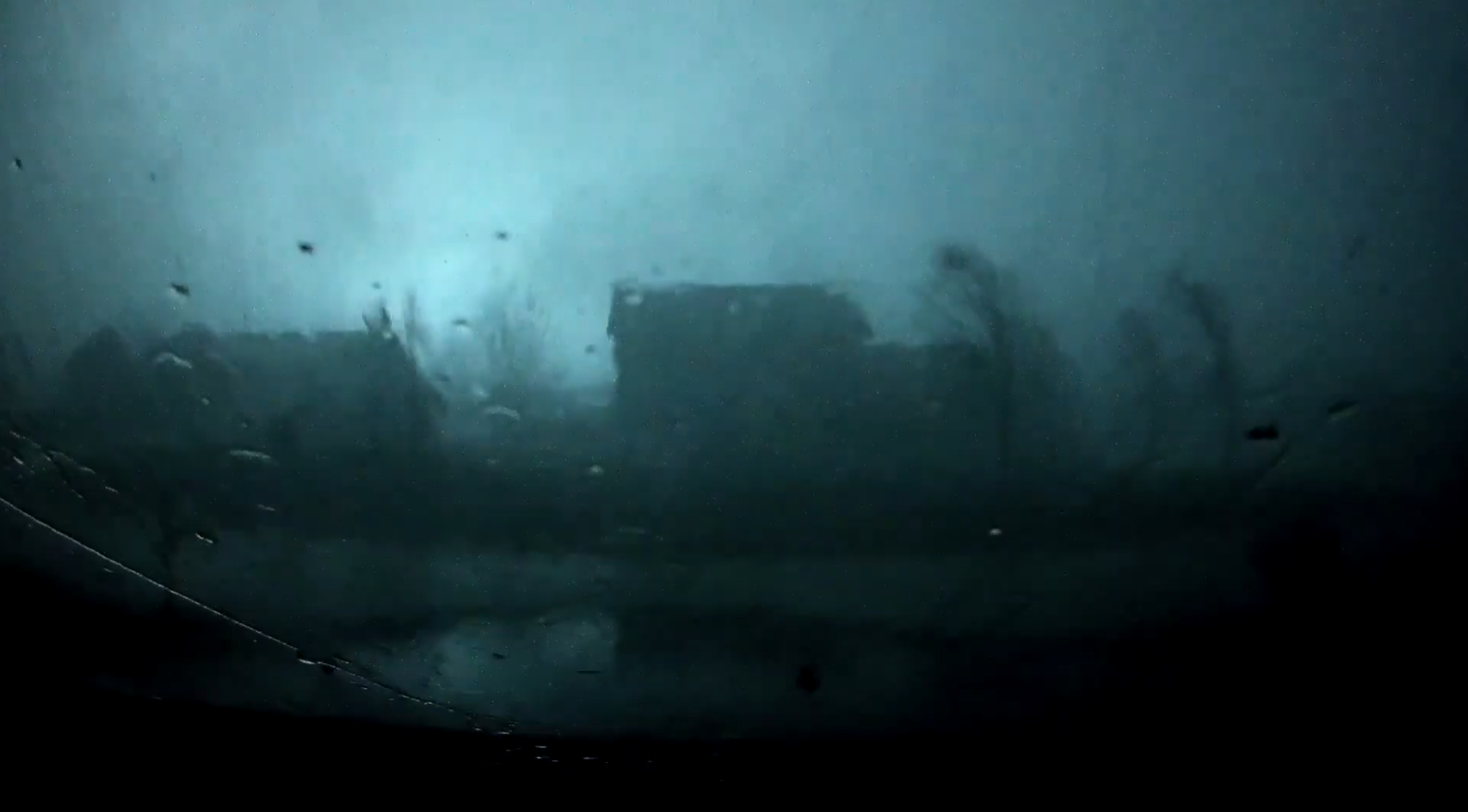
- The tornado, as seen in Cookeville from a dashcam

Meteorological history
- Formed: March 3, 2020, 1:48 a.m. CST (UTC−06:00)
- Dissipated: March 3, 2020, 1:56 a.m. CST (UTC−06:00)
- Duration: 8 minutes

EF4 tornado
- on the Enhanced Fujita scale
- Highest winds: 175 mph (282 km/h)

Overall effects
- Casualties: 19 fatalities, 87 injuries
- Damage: $100 million (2020 USD)

The supercell responsible for producing the Nashville tornado ascended the Highland Rim and produced another tornado northwest of Baxter in Putnam County at 1:48 a.m. CST (07:48 UTC) on March 3. The tornado touched down along the north side of U.S. 70N and moved due east, producing EF0 damage to trees, outbuildings, and homes as it approached Highway 56 near Baxter. The tornado reached EF1 intensity as it crossed Highway 56 and moved through a residential subdivision. It caused minor to moderate roof damage to numerous homes and destroyed an outbuilding. The tornado intensified to EF2 strength as it crossed Prosperity Drive, tearing the roof and exterior walls off a home. Entering the community of Double Springs, the tornado heavily damaged or destroyed numerous homes and a garage structure at EF2 to EF3 strength, before cutting a narrow swath of intense damage across Bloomington Road, Clemmons Road, and Charlton Square. As the tornado crossed Charlton Square in the eastern part of the Eller Plantation subdivision, two homes were swept away. These homes were built on block foundations, but were fairly well-anchored, earning an EF4 rating. Numerous other nearby homes in the subdivision were also damaged or destroyed. Maintaining EF4 strength along a 0.8-mile (1.3 km) swath, the tornado crossed Plunk Whitson Road and moved eastward through more residential areas.

Catastrophic damage occurred in this area as entire portions of neighborhoods were completely flattened. Numerous fatalities occurred as at least 17 well-anchored block-foundation homes were leveled or swept away along Hensley Drive and North McBroom Chapel Road. Vehicles were thrown and severely damaged, and numerous trees were denuded and partially debarked in this area. Homes farther away from the center of the damage path sustained loss of roofs and exterior walls.

Continuing eastward, the tornado continued to produce EF4 damage as it leveled a large apartment building along the north side of U.S. 70N. Just east of this point, additional EF4 damage occurred in the Echo Valley subdivision, where many homes were leveled or swept away. The tornado continued along U.S. 70N, weakening to high-end EF3 strength as it flattened the Echo Valley Market, a local convenience store. EF3-strength damage continued as it impacted residential areas within the vicinity of South Drive and Locust Grove Road, damaging or destroying multiple homes. A few poorly anchored homes were leveled or swept from their foundations along this segment of the path, while a small apartment building, a metal structure, and outbuildings also sustained significant damage. Several metal storage unit buildings were destroyed in this area as well.

The tornado weakened further to EF2 intensity as it crossed Tennessee Avenue and Miller Road, badly damaging a smoke shop and a metal-framed warehouse structure. Significant damage continued as the tornado moved due-east, following West Broad Street (U.S. 70N). Mobile homes and outbuildings were destroyed, and numerous frame homes were damaged, some of which sustained roof and exterior wall loss. A few businesses and other structures, including a bank and the Upper Cumberland Electric Membership Corporation, also sustained considerable damage as the tornado entered the Cookeville city limits.

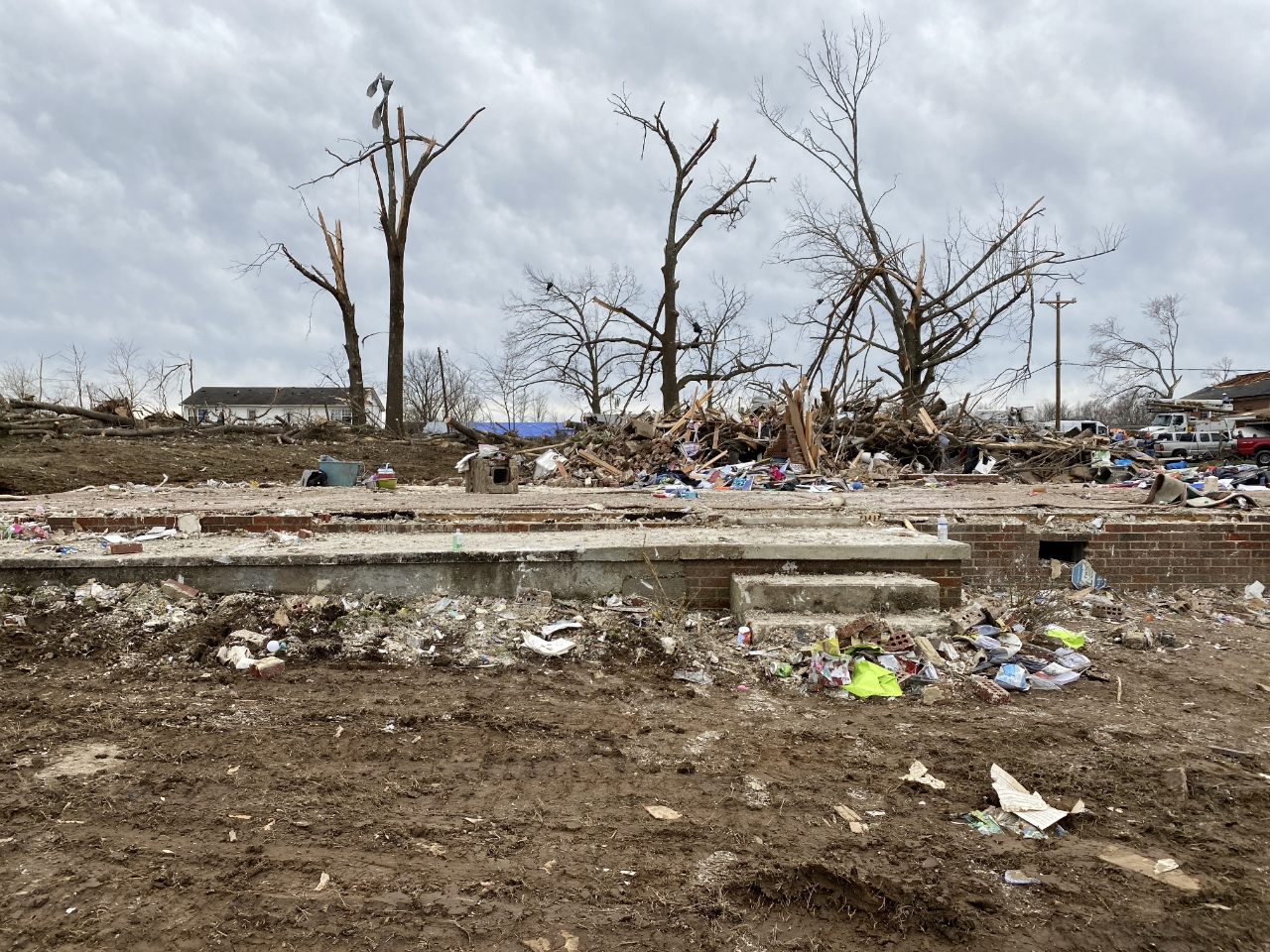
EF4 damage to a well-anchored house near Cookeville in the aftermath.

A majority of the damage along this corridor was rated EF2, though a small pocket of low-end EF3 damage occurred near County Farm Road, where a poorly anchored home was swept away. At the intersection of Pippin Road and West Jackson Street with West Broad Street, an Exxon gas station was severely damaged, and a small used car dealership across the street was leveled and swept away, with only the basement of the building remaining. This damage was given a high-end EF2 rating. Continuing towards downtown Cookeville, the tornado passed south of Sycamore Elementary School, downing trees and causing minor to moderate damage to homes and other structures at EF0 to EF1 strength. Additional EF0 to EF1 damage to trees, some apartment buildings, and homes occurred as the tornado crossed Buck Avenue and moved through areas just east of this point. The tornado then dissipated at Laurel Avenue and West 6th Street at 1:56 a.m. CST (07:56 UTC), just west of Cookeville Regional Medical Center and southwest of Tennessee Tech. The university remained closed for the two days following the storm. This tornado was given an EF4 rating, with maximum estimated winds of 175 mph (282 km/h). A total of 19 people were killed and 87 more were injured along the 8.39-mile (13.50 km) path.

== Non-tornadic impacts ==
The severe and tornadic thunderstorms across the region brought numerous other impacts aside from the tornadoes. In Kentucky, golf-ball sized hail fell in Paducah during the afternoon of March 2. Later a microburst with winds near 85 mph (137 km/h) caused major damage to a marina on Lake Barkley in Kuttawa. One boat was blown off a lift and partially submerged; damage at the marina was estimated at $500,000 (2020 USD). Flash flooding was also reported near the Hopkinsville Airport, where two cars were stranded, and Elkton due to the heavy rain. Two roads in Coral Hill were also closed due to flowing water on the roadways.

In Tennessee, the long-tracked Nashville supercell also bought baseball-to-lime-sized hail to Charlotte, shattering windshields of numerous cars and causing roof damage to some homes, leading to $15,000 (2020 USD) in damage. Later, after the Nashville EF3 tornado had lifted, a four-mile (6.4 km) long swath of straight-line winds of up to 75 mph (121 km/h) affected eastern Smith County north of Lancaster, with several trees being snapped or uprooted and a few outbuildings suffering roof damage. Damage here was estimated at $10,000 (2020 USD). Originally classified as an EF0 tornado, the beginning of the tornado track was shifted a couple miles west to the Smith–Putnam county line.

Although spared from the worst impacts, Alabama also had their fair share of destructive weather the day after the outbreak on March 4. Severe thunderstorms bought destructive straight-line winds that downed numerous trees south of Interstate 85 across the southern part of the state. The highest wind gust was 59 mph (95 km/h) at the Troy Municipal Airport, which coincided with the many reports of downed trees around the city of Troy.

== Aftermath ==
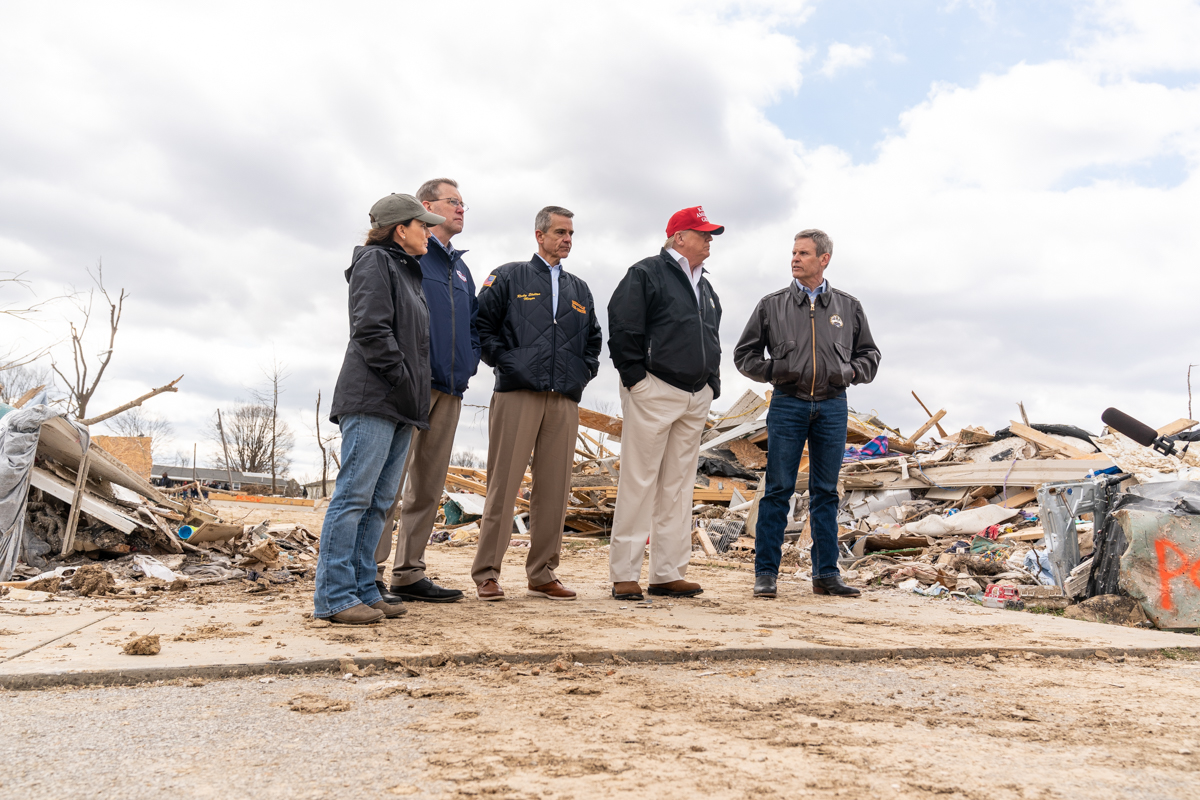
President Trump, Governor Lee, and local officials tour tornado damage in the Echo Valley and McBroom Chapel area of Cookeville.

The Nashville Emergency Operations Center (EOC) was partially activated in the morning to monitor damage reports and respond to emergency calls. A gas leak in Germantown caused authorities conduct a temporary evacuation. Tennessee governor Bill Lee declared a state of emergency for the entire state, which was later declared a second time due to the COVID-19 pandemic. President Donald Trump visited the state on March 6 and toured the hardest hit areas, including Putnam County. The Nashville Predators opened their home venue, Bridgestone Arena, for victims of the storm to get help and free pizza on March 3. Hands On Nashville, a local nonprofit, acted as a database for volunteers to assist with recovery efforts.

Metro Nashville Public Schools, Wilson County Schools, and Putnam County Schools were closed for the rest of the week, with Mount Juliet Christian Academy, West Wilson Middle School and the adjacent Stoner Creek Elementary in Mount Juliet being heavily damaged and closed the remainder of the school year. Donelson Christian Academy was mostly destroyed as well. Schools in Wilson County never resumed after the tornado for the remainder of the 2019–20 school year, due to the COVID-19 pandemic, and other schools in Mount Juliet were significantly restructured to accommodate students from West Wilson and Stoner Creek when the new school year began on August 17.

About 73,000 people across the state were left without power. Interstate 40 was closed in both directions between Mount Juliet and Lebanon for 12 hours following the storm.

One year after the outbreak, Hope Park was dedicated in Putnam County on the properties of three homes destroyed by the tornado as a memorial to the 19 deaths in the county. Additionally, Tennessee Tech and the city of Cookeville honored the victims by ringing bells 19 times at 1:48 p.m. CST on March 3 (a year and 12 hours after the tornado touched down).

West Wilson Middle and Stoner Creek Elementary in Mount Juliet, which sustained catastrophic damage, were closed for the next two school years. Both schools had to be rebuilt, with demolition of the old buildings and construction of new schools starting in 2021.

=== Super Tuesday ===
The tornadoes struck a few hours before the voting was scheduled to open for the Tennessee Super Tuesday primary. A delay of one hour was announced for the opening of polls in Davidson and Wilson counties; they were set to close on time. Although many poll officials as well as polling sites were affected, the polling was scheduled to continue with adjustments. Two election commission offices in Davidson County were designated as "super sites" where anyone from the counties affected by the tornadoes could vote. Generators were supplied to polling sites without power. Fifteen sites diverted voters to alternate locations. On request from four of the Democratic primary candidates, the Davidson County Superior Court judge issued a ruling extending voting in the county by an hour; five sites were set to open for voting until 10:00 p.m. CST.

== See also ==
- Weather of 2020
- List of North American tornadoes and tornado outbreaks
- List of F4 and EF4 tornadoes
  - List of F4 and EF4 tornadoes (2020–present)
- List of case studies on tornadoes (2020–present)
- March 1933 Nashville tornado outbreak
- Tornado outbreak of April 15–16, 1998 – An outbreak that produced an F3 tornado in Nashville along a similar path to the 1933 and 2020 storms.
- 2008 Super Tuesday tornado outbreak – A similar tornado outbreak in Tennessee on Super Tuesday in 2008.
- Tornado outbreak of March 2–3, 2012 – Also produced significant tornadoes in Kentucky and Tennessee on the same dates.
  - 2012 Crittenden tornado – A similarly short lived, but violent EF4 tornado over in Kentucky.
