= Pre-tertiary-education accreditation =

U.S.A. quality assurance for elementary, middle and high schools

Pre-tertiary-education accreditation is a type of quality assurance process used in the United States under which services and operations of pre-tertiary schools and educational institutions or programs are evaluated by an external body to determine if applicable standards are met.

== History ==
The initial focus of education accreditation was on secondary schools. For example, the North Central Association of Colleges and Schools was organized in 1895 with the objective of "the establishment of close relations between the colleges and secondary schools." Better articulation between the two levels of education was a particular focus. In pursuit of that objective, the association undertook a thorough examination of education quality at both the secondary and college level. That examination process led to the establishment of an accreditation process for secondary schools. Accreditation of colleges and universities followed later. The North Central Commission carried out the functions of post-secondary accreditation and accreditation of pre-college education through a unified organization until 2000, when its Commission on Schools (later NAC CASI and now merged into AdvancED) and its Commission on Institutions of Higher Education (now the Higher Learning Commission) were formed as independent corporations that began independent operation on January 1, 2001.

== Federal context ==
In the United States, educational accreditation has long been established as a peer review process coordinated by accreditation commissions and member institutions. With the creation of the U.S. Department of Education and under the terms of the Higher Education Act of 1965, as amended, the U.S. Secretary of Education is required by law to publish a list of nationally recognized accrediting agencies for higher education. There is no similar federal government list of recognized accreditation agencies for primary and secondary schools. Public schools must adhere to criteria set by the state governments, and there is wide variation among the individual states in the requirements applied to non-public primary and secondary schools. There are six regional accreditors in the United States that have historically accredited (and therefore include among their membership) most elementary schools, junior high schools, middle schools, high schools, as well as nearly all public and private institutions of higher education that are academic in nature.

Some states, including Missouri and North Dakota, accredit public secondary schools within their borders.

== See also ==
- Educational accreditation
- International Standard Classification of Education
- National Association of Independent Schools
