= 2020 Cookeville tornado =

2020 tornado in Tennessee, U.S.

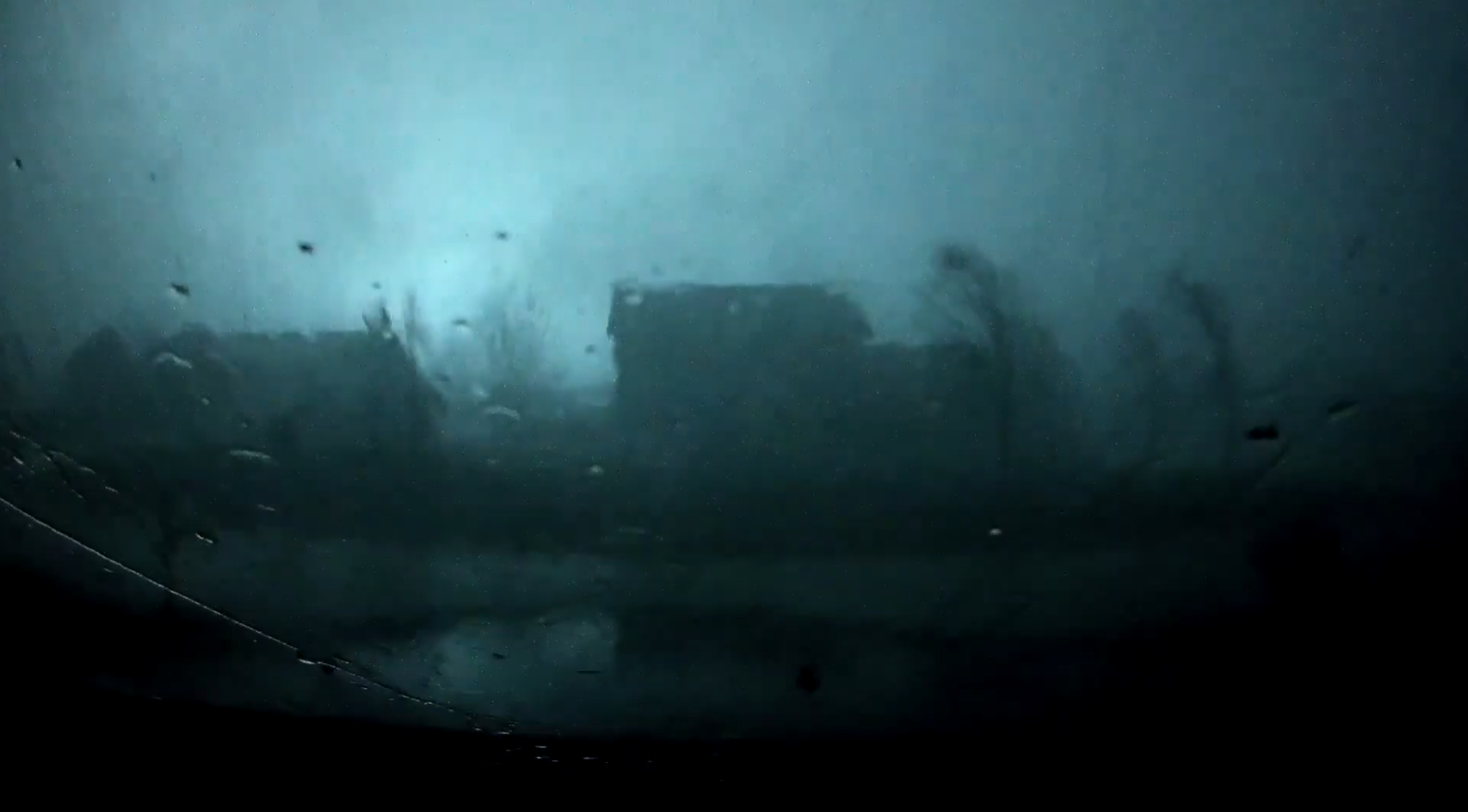
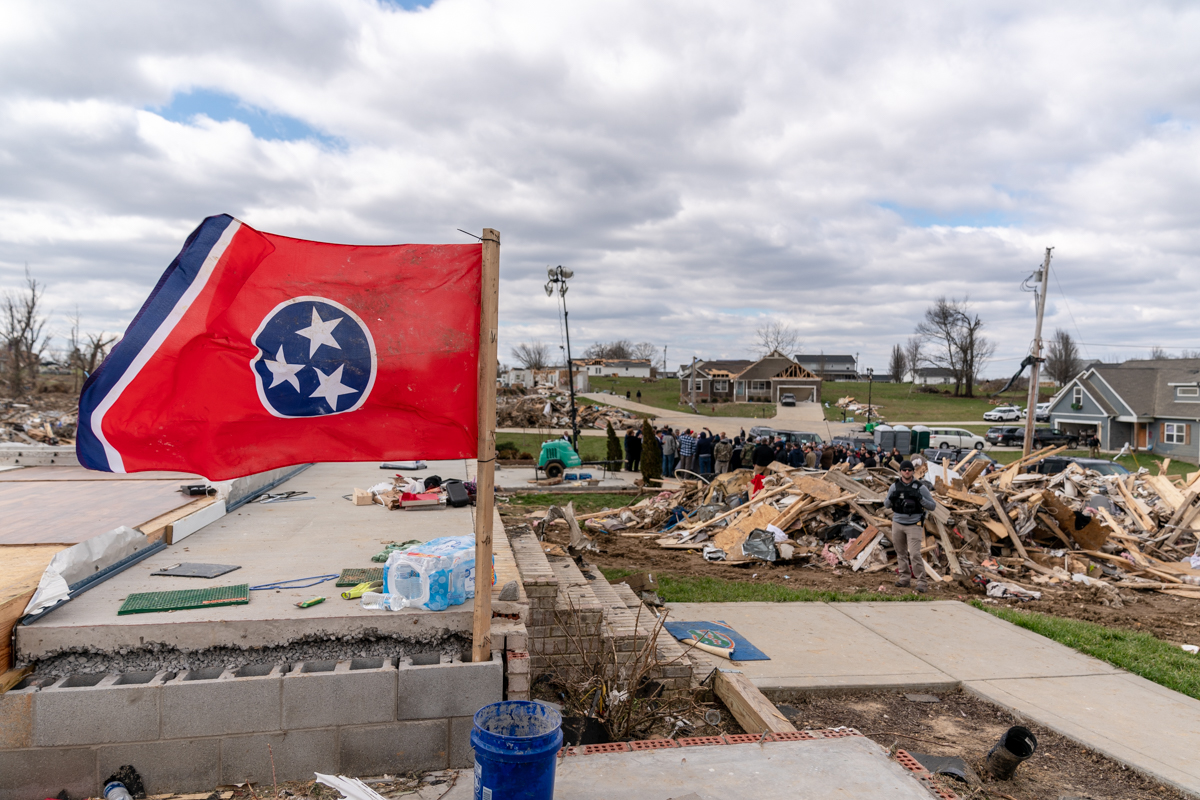
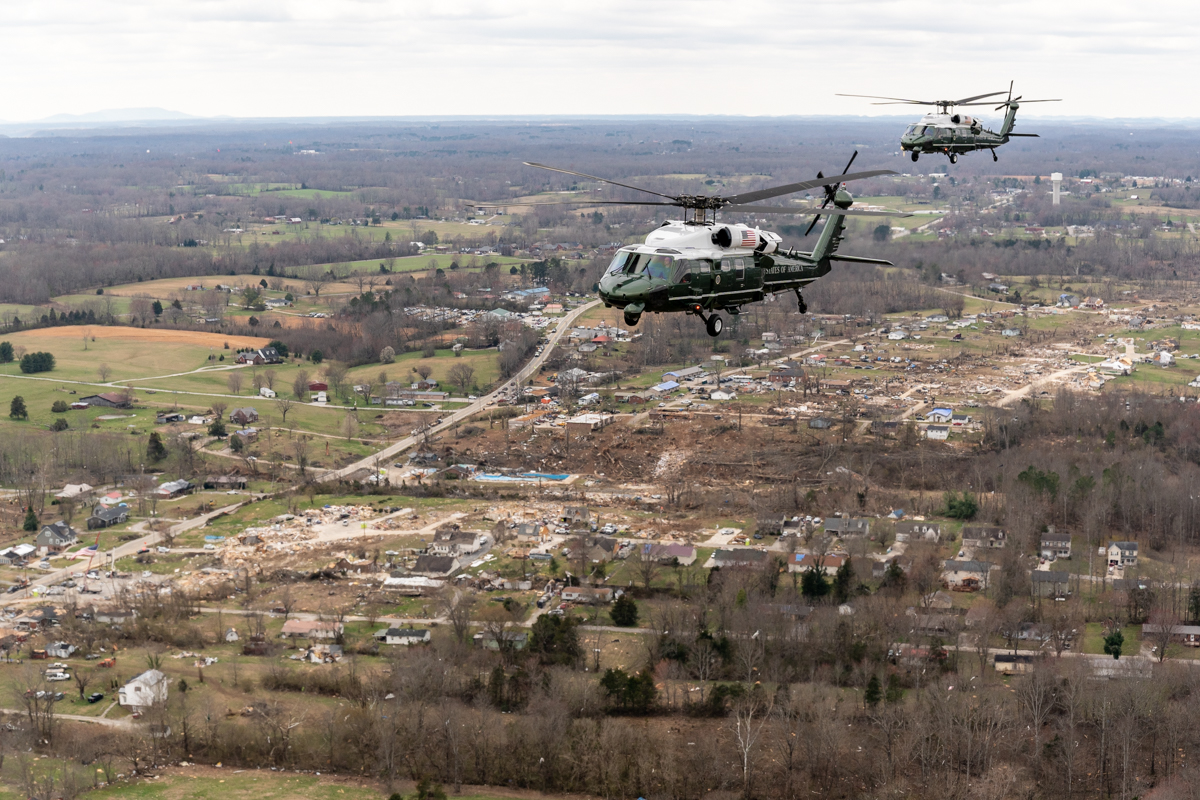
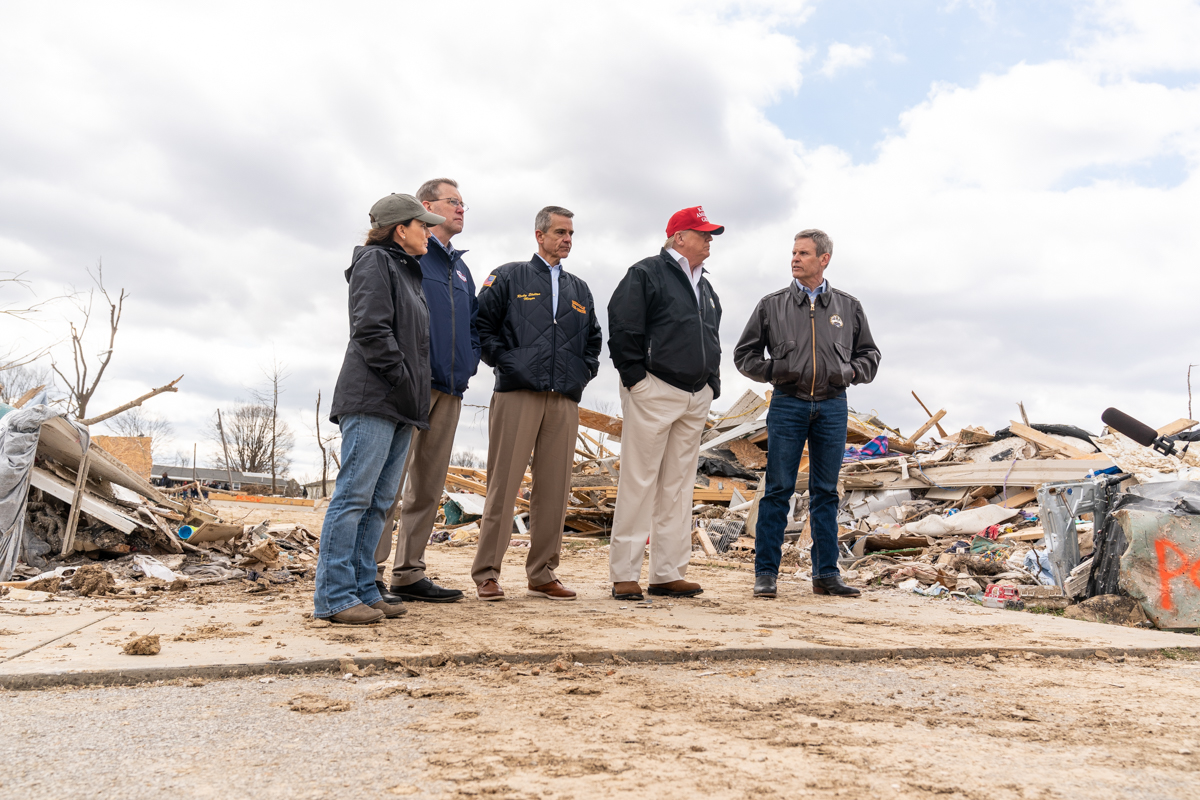
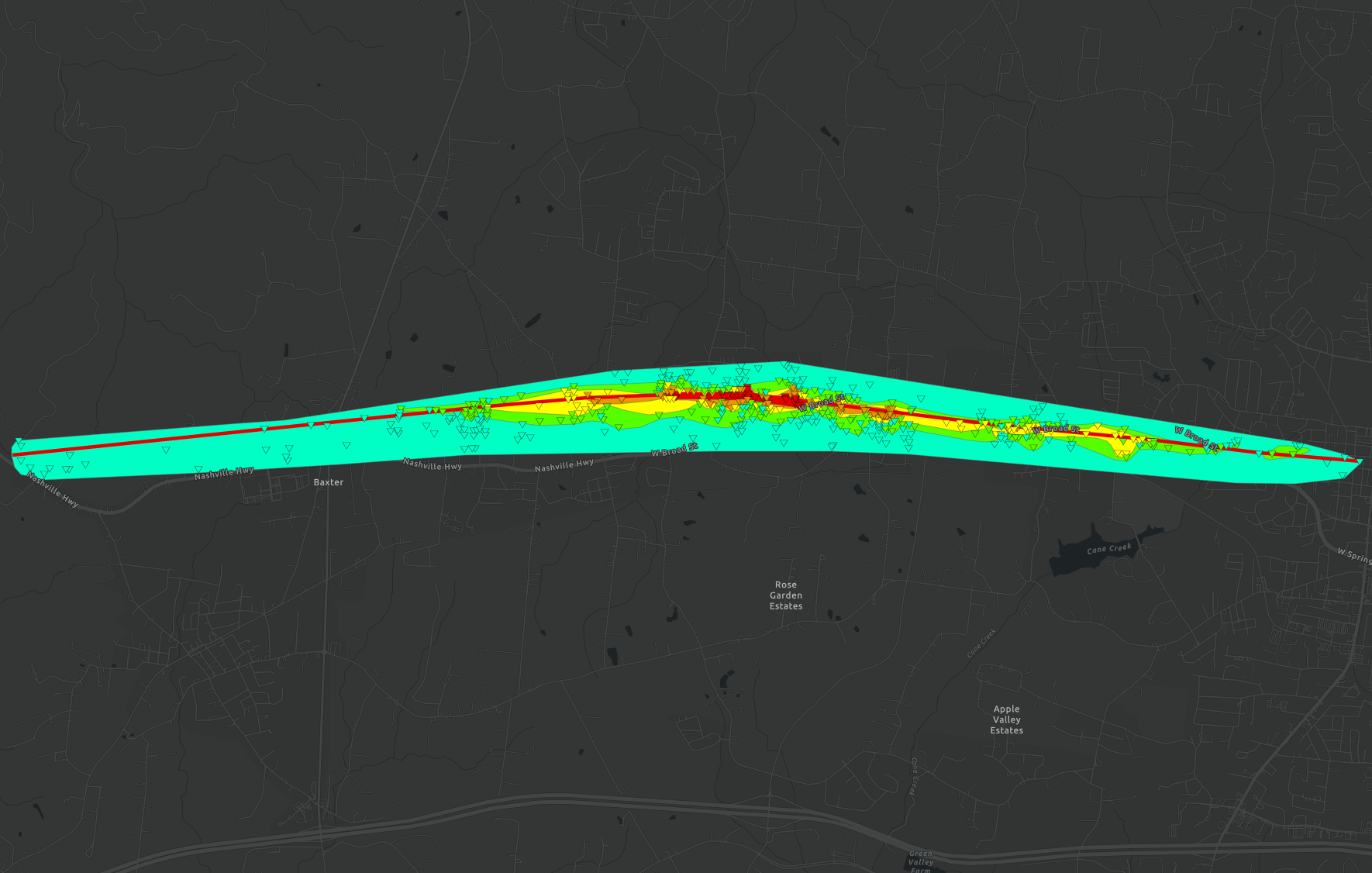
- Clockwise from top: The tornado (left side) as seen from a dashcam; Aerial view of the tornado damage within Cookeville; The track of the tornado; President Trump touring damage within Cookeville; A Tennessee state flag waving with destroyed homes in the background

Meteorological history
- Formed: March 3, 2020, 1:48 a.m. CST
- Dissipated: March 3, 2020, 1:56 a.m. CST
- Duration: 8 minutes

EF4 tornado
- on the Enhanced Fujita scale
- Max width: 900 yards (0.51 mi; 0.82 km)
- Path length: 8.39 miles (13.50 km)
- Highest winds: 175 mph (282 km/h)

Overall effects
- Fatalities: 19
- Injuries: 87
- Damage: $100 million (2020 USD)
- Areas affected: Putnam County, Tennessee
- Power outages: 10,000
- Houses destroyed: ~100
- Part of the Tornado outbreak of March 2–3, 2020 and Tornadoes of 2020

During the pre-dawn hours of March 3, 2020, a short-lived but devastating and violent nocturnal tornado that was part of a small yet significant outbreak tracked 8.39 miles through portions of Putnam County, Tennessee, shortly after a long-lived, intense tornado moved through Nashville. The tornado was on the ground for roughly 8 minutes, tracking from Baxter to just west of downtown Cookeville. The tornado quickly intensified along its track, causing catastrophic damage to dozens of homes and businesses within several communities, killing 19 people and leaving another 87 injured.

The tornado first touched down northwest of Baxter, just east of US 70N, and tracked eastward with a forward speed of 65 miles per hour (105 km/h), inflicting EF0 damage to trees along US 70N. The tornado damaged several homes and demolished a barn before intensifying near Stephanie Lane. The tornado impacted numerous residences and outbuildings at EF1 intensity before strengthening further and inflicting EF2 damage to a home near Partridge trail. The tornado strengthened to EF3 intensity and destroyed several homes near Clemmons Road before crossing a field and approaching Charlton Square. Along Charlton Square, several homes were leveled with one individual getting trapped under debris. Two homes were completely swept clean off their foundations at EF4 strength.

The tornado continued to inflict severe damage to homes before reaching peak intensity on the south side of Hensley Drive. Along the south side of the street, nearly every home was leveled at EF4 intensity, with surrounding homes also sustaining significant damage. The tornado then crossed North McBroom Chapel Road, demolishing more homes, including one that was well-anchored to its foundation. The tornado destroyed the top two stories of an apartment complex and leveled several more homes along Echo Valley Drive before weakening to EF3 intensity and destroying the Echo Valley Market gas station. The tornado continued to weaken, tracking further into Cookeville at EF1 intensity before dissipating after being on the ground for eight minutes.

The tornado inflicted $100 million (2020 USD) (Note: All amounts of money are in 2020 USD unless stated otherwise.) in damages, and was the worst tornado on record to affect Putnam County. At least 17 well-built homes were completely leveled, with numerous other buildings sustaining severe damage. The tornado reportedly caught many people off-guard, with most residents in the area sleeping during the time of the storm, and having as little as a one-minute warning near the tornado's touchdown point, with those in the hardest-hit areas having a seven-to-nine minute warning. The tornado was the sixth-deadliest in Tennessee's history.

== Meteorological synopsis ==
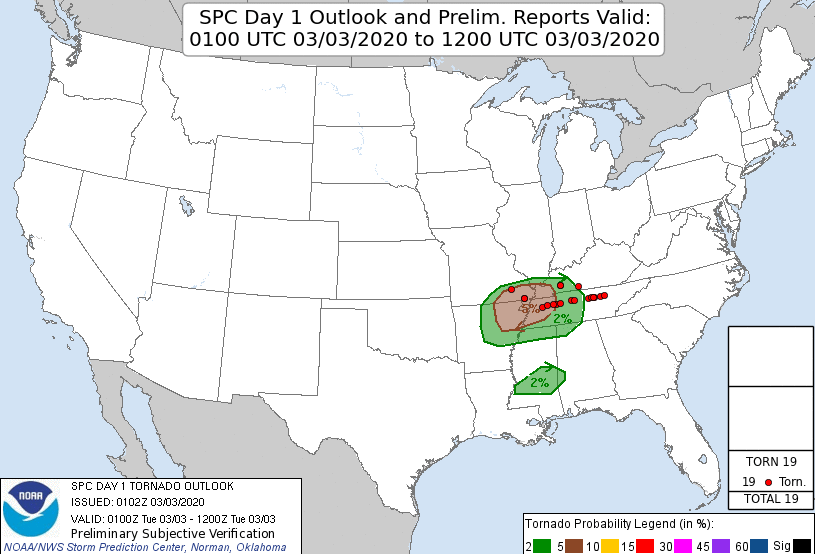
Preliminary tornado reports overlapping on the Day 1 Outlook for March 3, 2020

At 12:00 a.m. CST, (Note: All times listed in the article are in CST unless stated otherwise.) March 2, 2020, the Storm Prediction Center outlined a slight risk for severe weather for western Tennessee, alongside a 2% probability for a tornado within 25 miles of a point within the area as a cold front stretching from the upper Great Lakes region to western Texas began to move eastward. As the day progressed, low-level moisture began to move into the region alongside an increase in low-level wind shear. As atmospheric instability increased and the environment grew more favorable for severe storm development, a 5% probability for a tornado within 25 miles of a point was outlined for portions of western Tennessee at 10:30 a.m. At 2:00 p.m., the regions for 2% and 5% probability for a tornado within 25 miles of a point were expanded to include much of western Tennessee. At 7:00 p.m., thunderstorms began to develop from northern Arkansas to western Kentucky, with some developing into supercells as they traveled into a more favorable environment. Several supercellular thunderstorms developed and traveled across southeast Missouri, southern Kentucky, Tennessee, and central Alabama. A single supercell thunderstorm produced all ten tornadoes within Tennessee, including the tornado that impacted the city of Nashville. All of these tornadoes had a forward speed of around 65 mph (105 km/h). Several of these tornadoes, including the one that devastated portions of Putnam County, occurred outside of the tornado probability regions issued by the Storm Prediction Center.

== Tornado summary ==
=== Touchdown and impacts near Baxter ===
The tornado touched down at 1:48 a.m. 2.5 miles (4.0 km) northwest of Baxter, Tennessee, just west of Thompson Ridge Road and east of US 70N. The tornado began to track eastward with a forward speed of around 65 mph (105 km/h) as it paralleled US 70N, uprooting and damaging trees at EF0 intensity. The tornado inflicted EF0 damage to several homes and outbuildings, with two houses near Birdwell Lane sustaining roof damage. The tornado continued to track eastward, crossing Byers Road and impacting a house along US 70N, damaging the roof and blowing the garage doors inward with estimated wind speeds of 85 mph (137 km/h). The tornado damaged the roofs of two other houses before crossing Pine Grove Road as it maintained EF0 strength. The tornado tracked over Millie Lane and Tennessee State Route 56 as it completely destroyed an old barn near Oliver Way, blowing the debris northward.

The tornado maintained its easterly course, uprooting softwood trees as it passed over Harris Lane. The tornado then began to enter more residential areas as it intensified slightly, damaging the roofs and siding of several houses along Stephanie Lane at EF0 strength, and completely destroying an outbuilding at EF1 intensity of 95 mph (153 km/h), with debris being tossed up to 250 yd (0.14 mi; 0.23 km) away. The tornado passed just north of Big Ben Circle, inflicting EF0 to EF1 damage to several houses. An outbuilding near West Minister Drive was overturned at EF0 strength. The tornado tracked along Partridge Trail, inflicting EF1 damage to over a dozen houses. The tornado intensified further as it crossed Prosperity Drive just north of the intersection with Partridge Trail, with a house just east of this intersection sustaining EF2 damage of 125 mph (201 km/h), with some exterior walls collapsing.

=== Subsequent strengthening ===
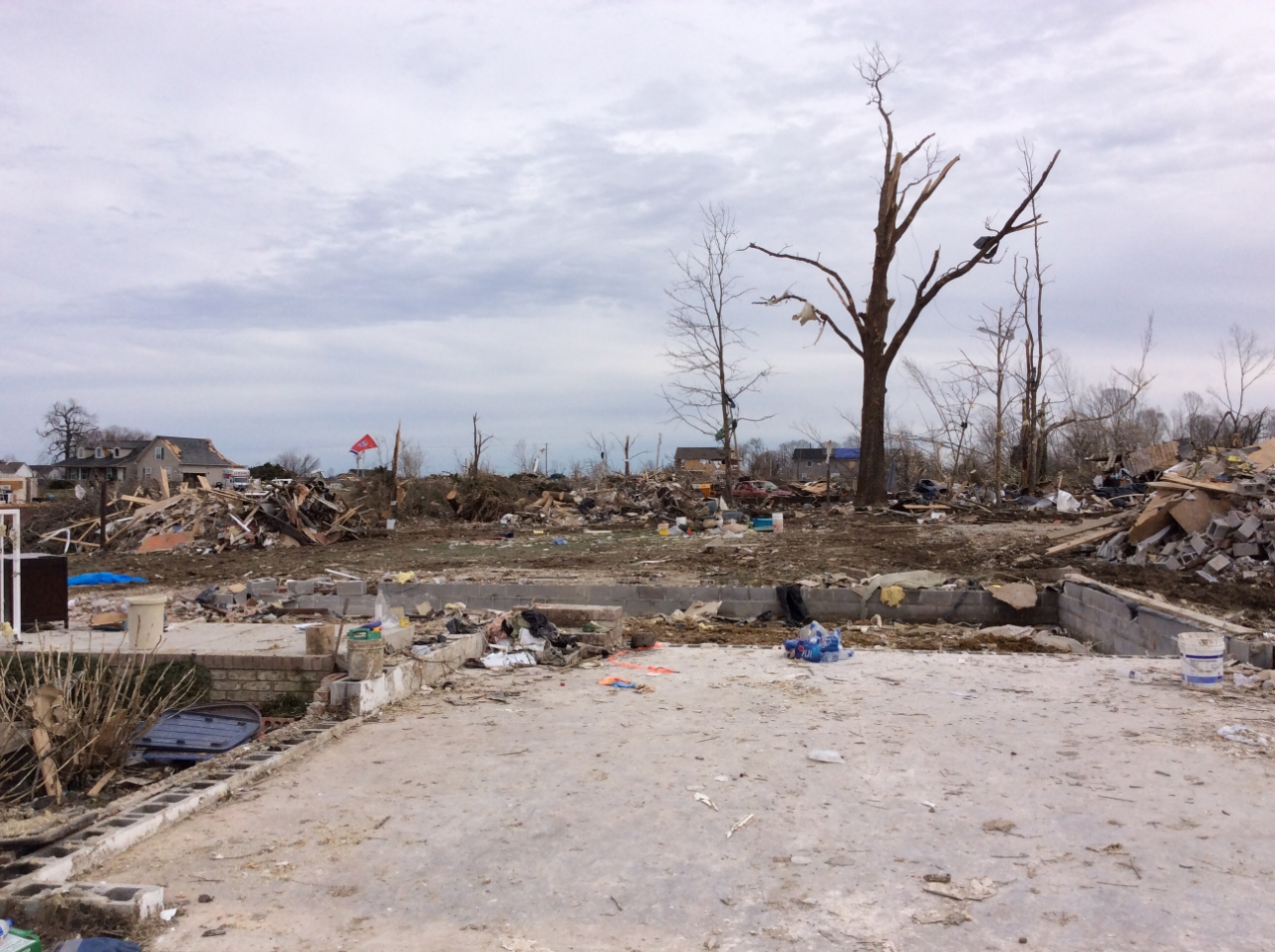
A house along Charlton Square that was leveled at low-end EF4 intensity

The tornado tracked across a field, uprooting trees at EF1 to EF2 intensity. A home near Leffew Road suffered EF0 damage. The tornado completely leveled a large hay shelter at EF1 strength. The tornado crossed Bloomington Road into the Double Springs community before intensifying and destroying several houses along Flatt Wheeler Road at high-end EF2 intensity. The tornado strengthened further to low-end EF3 strength as it destroyed two homes and a large garage between Flatt Wheeler Road and Clemmons Road with estimated wind speeds of 140 mph (225 km/h). The tornado then crossed Clemmons Road, destroying two homes at EF2 to EF3 intensity and minorly damaging several others residences.

The tornado crossed another small field before tracking over southern portions of Charlton Square, completely destroying and leveling several residences at high-end EF3 intensity with estimated winds speeds of 165 mph (266 km/h). One individual was pinned underneath an overturned dresser and debris as their house was destroyed. The tornado then strengthened once more as it struck several homes near the eastern side of Charlton Square, completely destroying two well-built residences and sweeping the slabs clean at low-end EF4 intensity with estimated winds of 170 mph (270 km/h). Numerous other homes sustained varying degrees of damage. The tornado then tracked just south of Savanna Trace, with two homes along the road sustaining low-end EF3 damage. The tornado crossed Plunk Whitson Road, with several homes being completely destroyed. One house along the west side of the road that was destroyed at high-end EF3 intensity had only one small room standing, in which five people took shelter and survived the tornado. The tornado then passed over houses on the east side of Plunk Whitson Road, with a home being completely destroyed at high-end EF3 intensity with the slab swept clean, and a house just south sustaining low-end EF4 damage, with only a few interior rooms remaining.

=== Peak intensity within Cookeville's western neighborhoods ===
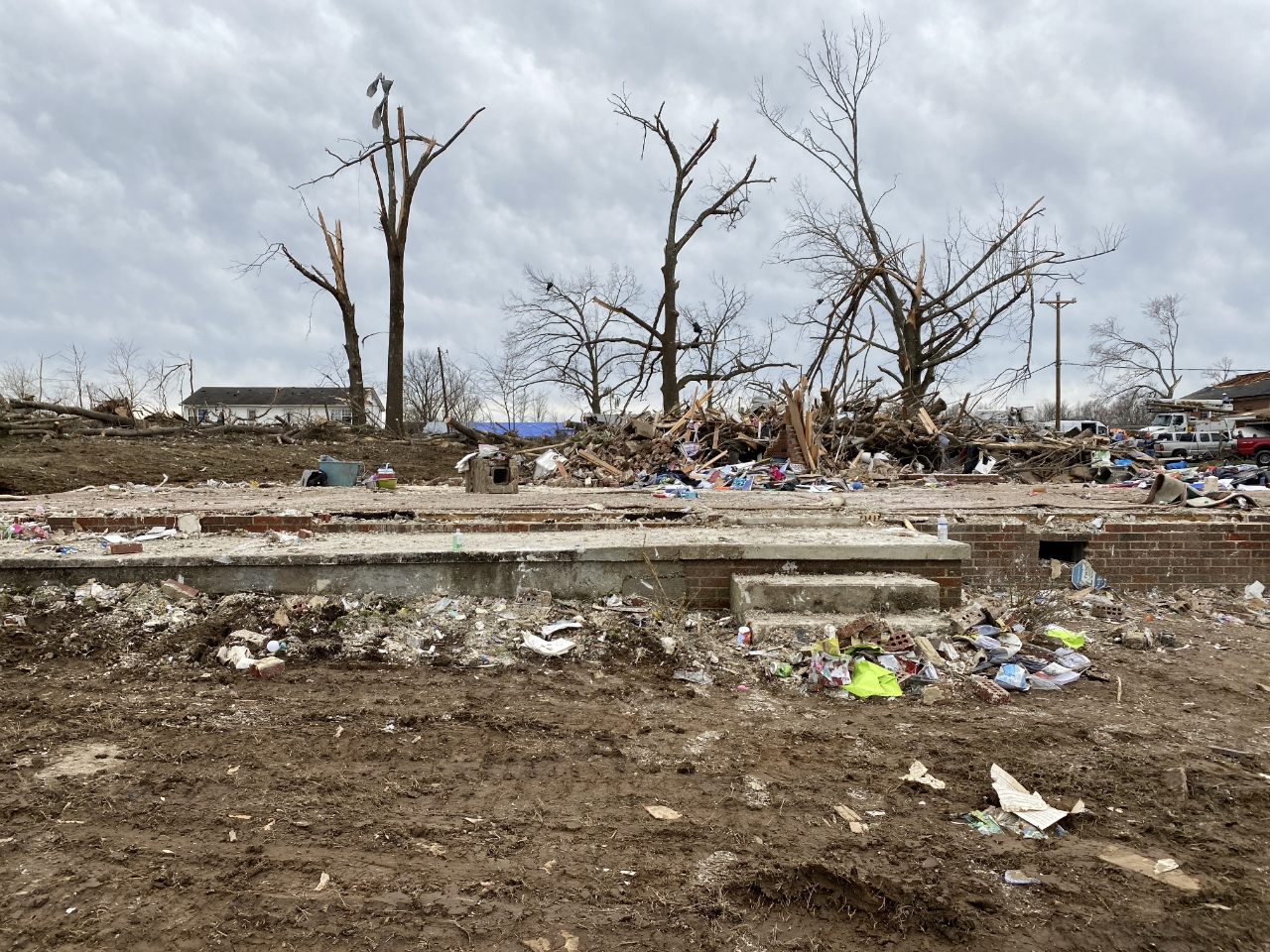
EF4 damage to a well-anchored house near Cookeville

The tornado reached its peak intensity with estimated wind speeds of 175 mph (282 km/h) as it began to parallel Hensley Drive just to the south, inflicting catastrophic, EF4-rated damage to nearly all the houses along the south side of the street. Homes north of Hensley Drive also suffered extreme damage, with several being destroyed at high-end EF3 to low-end EF4 intensity. Additionally, various buildings along McBroom Chapel Road were destroyed at mid-range to high-end EF3 intensity, including a mobile home and outbuilding. The tornado then crossed North McBroom Chapel Road, completely destroying a home with a well-attached foundation and sweeping the slab clean near the North McBroom Chapel Road/Mockingbird Hill Circle intersection with estimated wind speeds of 175 mph (282 km/h). Along Hensley Drive and North McBroom Chapel Road, 17 well-built homes were completely destroyed and seven adults and four children were killed. Two businesses near the edge of the tornado along US 70N sustained EF0 to EF1 damage. The tornado then crossed Mockingbird Hill Circle, with several homes sustaining severe damage. One home along the west side of the road sustained low-end EF4 damage. The tornado curved slightly to the southeast as it impacted houses along the east side of Mockingbird Hill Circle, debarking and destroying hardwood trees at low-end EF4 intensity. Several multifamily residences just south of the street sustained EF2 damage.

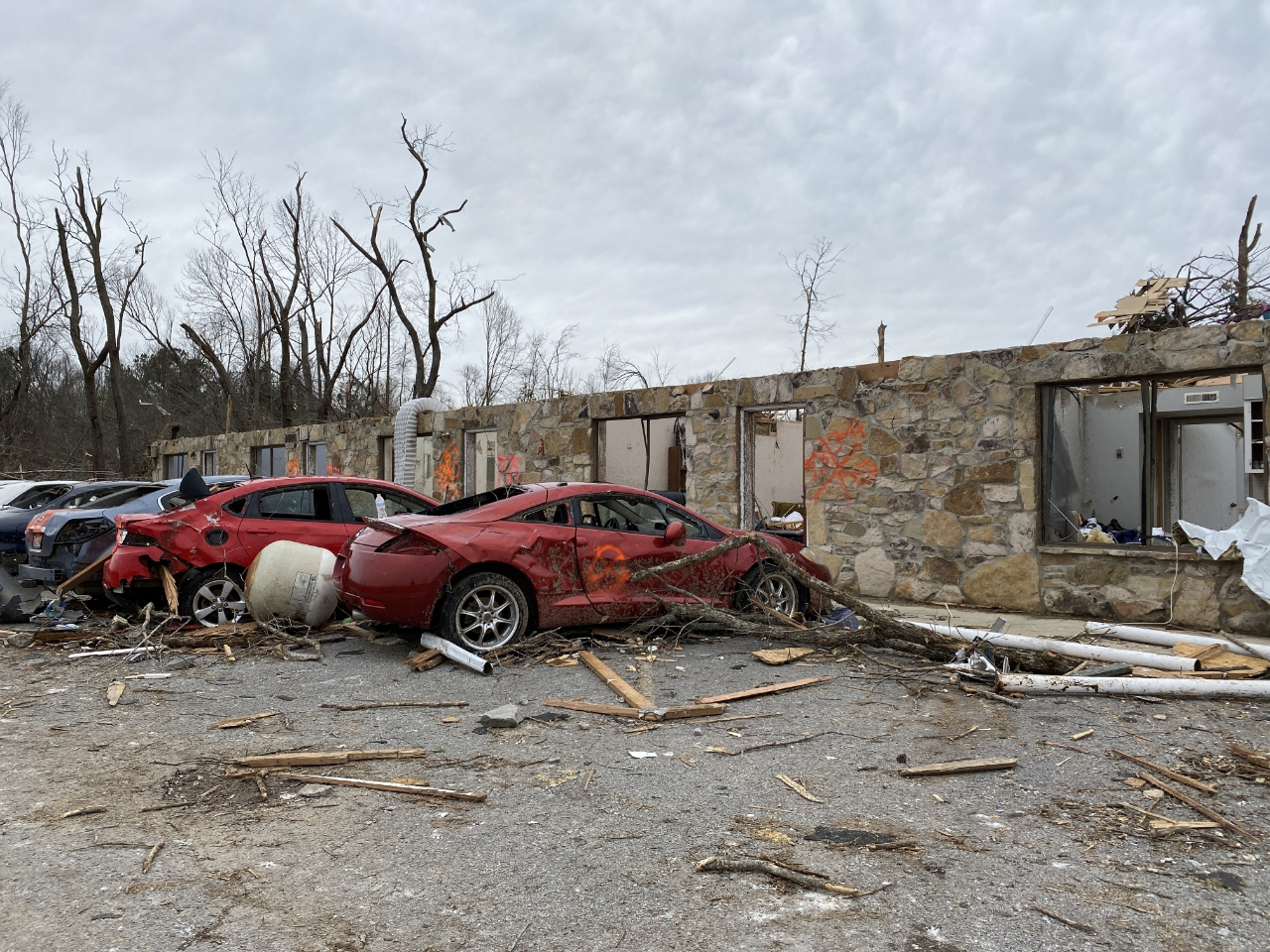
An apartment complex that was completely destroyed

The tornado crossed a small plot of land and a small creek before directly impacting an apartment complex, completely destroying the structure at low-end EF4 intensity. One woman was killed at this location. The tornado continued eastward before striking houses along Echo Valley Drive, where five houses were completely leveled at EF4 strength. Around this time, the tornado reached its peak width of 900 yards (0.51 mi; 0.82 km). Several other houses suffered EF3-rated damage, including one that was shifted off its foundation. The tornado then weakened to high-end EF3 intensity with estimated winds around 165 mph (266 km/h) as it struck the Echo Valley Market gas station, completely destroying it.

=== Weakening and eventual dissipation ===
The tornado crossed US 70N as it damaged several houses, with a small home that was poorly constructed being completely leveled at high-end EF3 intensity. The tornado tracked across South Drive, damaging several homes at low-end EF3 strength. The tornado struck a metal building as it approached Locust Grove Road, completely destroying it. Additionally, a house and outbuilding suffered EF3-rated damage. The tornado then tracked north of Hearld Court, inflicting EF3 damage to numerous houses along the north side of the street. A roof that was reportedly from a home a block away was found in this area. Houses along the south side of the street suffered EF2 damage. As the tornado continued to parallel Hearld Court, several storage unit buildings north of the street were destroyed at low-end EF3 intensity. Around this time, a dashcam video of the tornado was captured by a vehicle along Willow Brook Drive. The tornado inflicted minor damage to trees and homes as it tracked over a field. The tornado then crossed Tennessee Avenue, snapping hardwood trees. The tornado weakened to EF2 strength as it struck a metal building while crossing Miller Road, leading to its collapse. The tornado inflicted EF1 to EF2 damage to numerous outbuildings and homes before completely lofting and rolling a mobile home at EF2 intensity with estimated wind speeds of 115 mph (185 km/h). The tornado then once again crossed US 70N as it struck the Upper Cumberland Electric Membership Corporation building, shattering several windows at EF1 strength and tossing a trailer onto the roof.

Dashcam footage of the tornado as it was near Hearld Court at EF3 strength. The tornado appears at the 1:04 mark.

The tornado continued to track eastward, damaging homes and other structures at EF2 strength. One mobile home was completely destroyed, with the debris being blown away. The tornado crossed County Farm Road, producing a small pocket of EF3 damage of 145 mph (233 km/h), where a house had all its walls destroyed. The tornado continued to produce high-end EF2 damage, with one house sustaining severe damage from estimated winds of 135 mph (217 km/h). A person was killed in the stairwell. The tornado tracked across Royal Oak Drive and US 70N while maintaining EF2 strength. An Exxon gas station and a 7-Eleven convenience store just north of US 70N suffered EF0 damage. The tornado then crossed West Jackson Street, before destroying a house at high-end EF2 strength as it crossed Mill Drive. The tornado tore large sections of a home's roof off as it once again crossed US 70N. A house and two outbuildings north of the highway suffered EF2 damage, along with another outbuilding that was completely destroyed at EF1 intensity. Several metal buildings south of the highway were also destroyed.

The tornado collapsed several metal truss towers at mid-range EF2 strength as it crossed US 70N for a fifth time. The tornado struck several multifamily residences, with two buildings sustaining mid-range EF2 damage and two others sustaining EF0 to EF1 damage. The tornado then approached West Broad Street, damaging a house at EF2 intensity with estimated winds of 120 mph (193 km/h) before weakening to EF1 strength. Several other houses along West Broad Street suffered EF1 damage as the tornado began to head towards downtown Cookeville. The tornado uprooted trees at EF1 intensity before crossing US 70N for the last time, damaging several structures at EF0 to EF1 strength before weakening once more to EF0 intensity. The tornado damaged the roof of a house along Crescent Drive before briefly restrengthening to EF1 strength, uprooting hardwood trees. Two multifamily residences along the south side of West 8th Street sustained EF0 damage to their roofs as the tornado began to rapidly dissipate, inflicting scattered EF0 damage as it crossed numerous residential streets. The tornado then lifted at 1:56 a.m. along Laurel Avenue, just west of the Cookeville Regional Medical Center and southwest of Tennessee Technological University.

== Aftermath ==
=== Damage ===
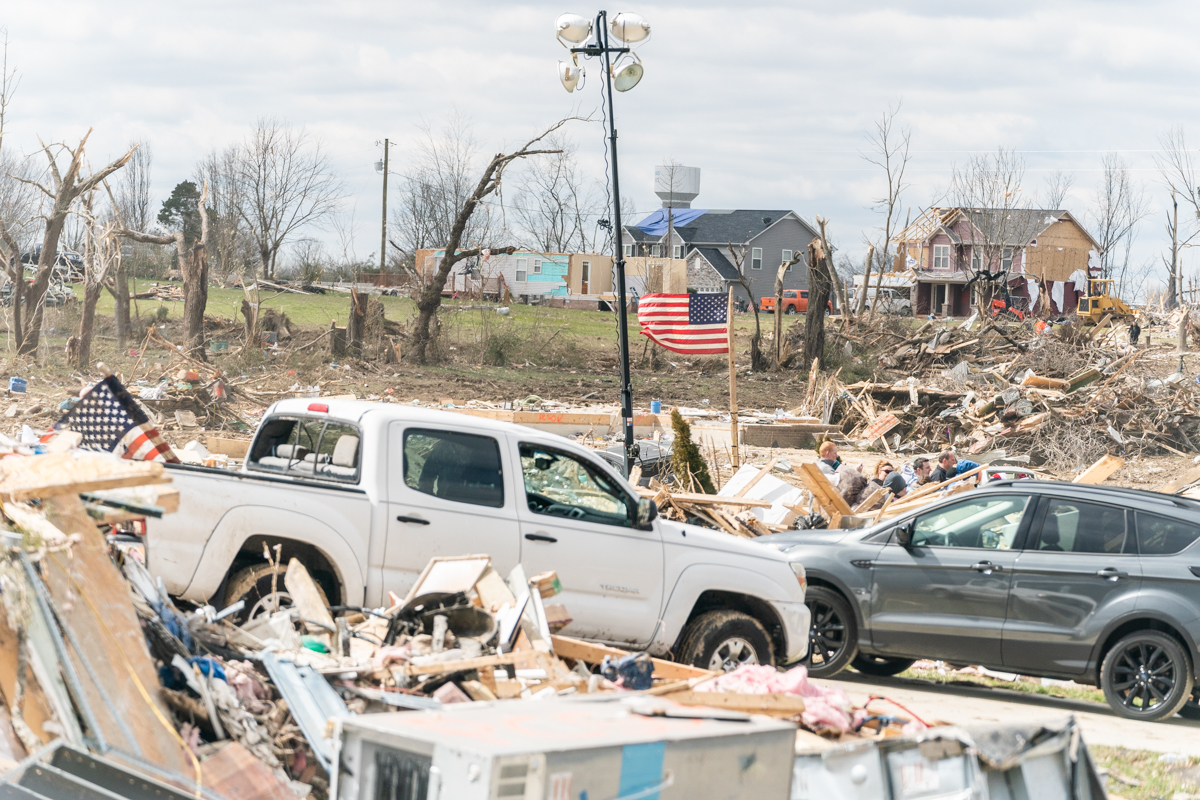
Widespread damage within Cookeville

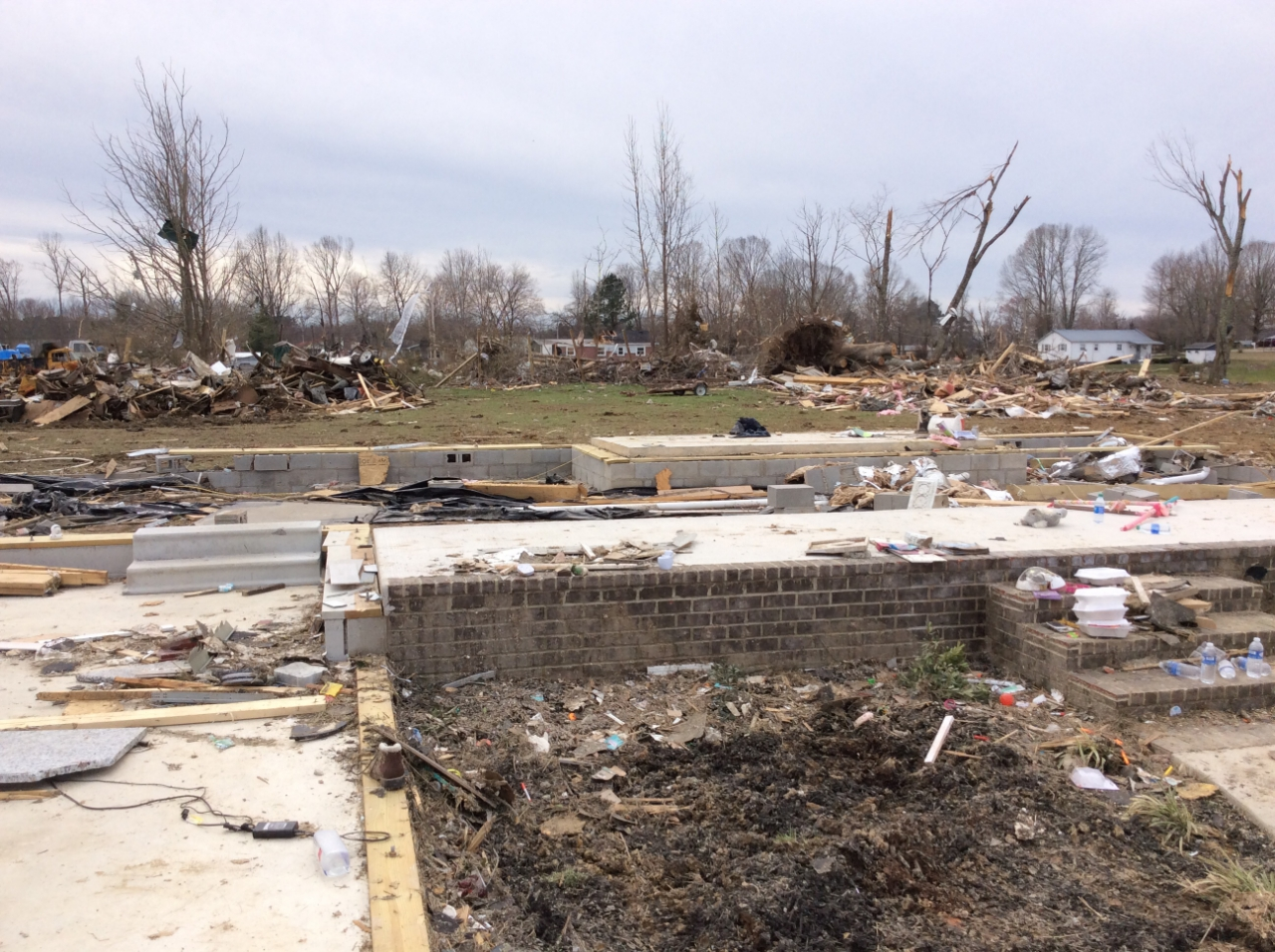
A house along Hensley Drive that was swept away at EF4 intensity

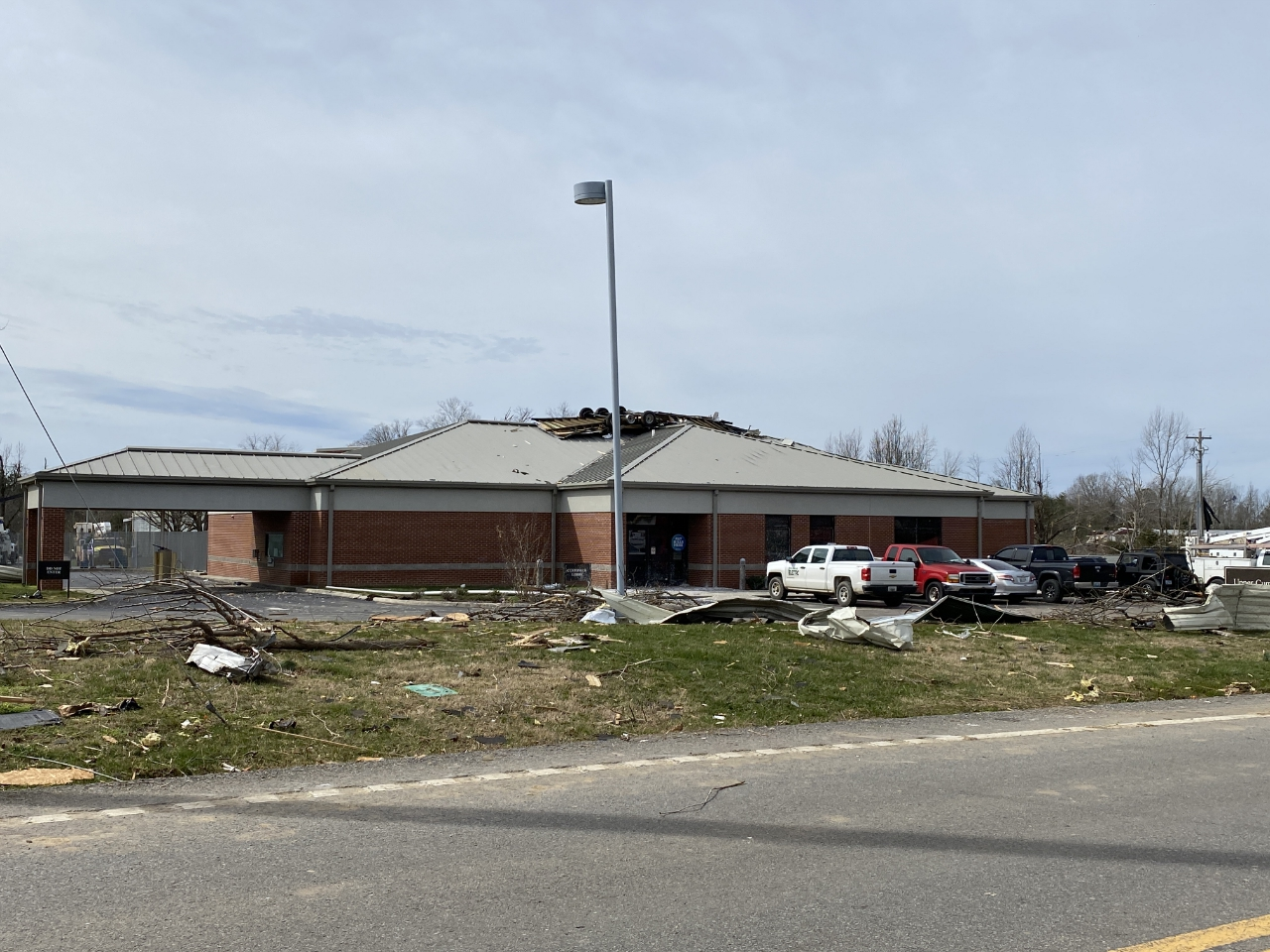
EF1 damage to the Cumberland Electric Membership Corporation building within Cookeville, with a trailer on the roof

The damage within the affected neighborhoods was so severe that it was reportedly described as a 'war zone'. Around 700 structures were damaged or destroyed by the tornado. Around 400 of those buildings included homes, of which an estimated 100 were completely destroyed. At least 17 sizeable, well-constructed homes were completely leveled at EF4 strength. Additionally, 31 commercial buildings and businesses were damaged along US 70N. At least 20 power poles were snapped or destroyed, with 10,000 residents initially losing power. Numerous trees sustained damage from the tornado, with some being debarked and destroyed at low-end EF4 intensity. Numerous cell towers were downed by the tornado, and gas lines were ruptured. Several vehicles sustained damage from the tornado. The Echo Valley apartment complex had the top two stories destroyed. The Echo Valley Market, a popular gas station and food market within Cookeville, was completely leveled. The Cumberland Electric Membership Corporation Cookeville District Office suffered damage, with a trailer that was thrown onto the roof collapsing portions of the ceiling. Property damage from the tornado totaled to $100 million.

=== Recovery efforts ===
In the wake of the tornado, 77 people went missing in Putnam County. By March 5, the number of people missing reached zero as everyone was accounted for. The tornado impacted the Tennessee Advanced Communications Network, limiting radio communication between emergency personnel. Eight mobile cell sites were deployed into Putnam County by FirstNet, and an additional 150 communication devices were given to first responders.

In the days following the tornado, over 70 members of the Tennessee National Guard assisted local officials in cleanup, recovery, and traffic control. 21 dump trucks and other cleanup equipment were utilized to remove debris from the area. Trained drivers and engineers from numerous Tennessee National Guard units volunteered to aid in the cleanup. One person was arrested for attempting to loot an apartment in the area.

Thousands of volunteers showed up to affected areas the day after the tornado, aiding in search and rescue, cleanup, and overall recovery. The high number of volunteers in the area reportedly shut down two state highways. Numerous crews located in eastern Tennessee aided in recovery and responded to the disaster, including members of the Knox County Rescue's Heavy/Collapse Team, Knoxville Fire Department, Scott County Rescue Squad, Tennessee Wildlife Resources Agency, and Tennessee Department of Transportation.

A project centered at the Cookeville Community Center aided in recovering hundreds of lost photographs, some of which were carried as far away as Johnson City, Tennessee. Members of Tennessee Tech University assisted in restoring and uploading discovered photos to a private digital archive, accessible only to those attempting to locate lost materials.

A spokesperson for the Cookeville Regional Medical Center stated that the hospital, which treated 82 individuals after the tornado, only billed each patient's insurance company, and did not charge any additional costs.

Tennessee Tech University closed for two days following the tornado out of respect for those impacted, and over 1,000 students enrolled assisted in recovery efforts. Numerous students and several faculty members assisted in setting up blood drives after the storm, with 49 nursing students from the university worked with Blood Assurance. Around 2,000 donors went on to give blood throughout the following week. Almost every Tennessee Tech Golden Eagle sports team participated in the cleanup and recovery, with the teams clearing debris, organizing supplies, or assisting in other ways. A book drive was organized to provide affected families with books, with donations coming in from places as far as Japan and over 4,000 books being donated by March 12.

The Nashville Predators Foundation donated $50,000 to the city of Cookeville to assist in tornado recovery efforts. The Tennessee Volunteers basketball team visited the Double Springs Church of Christ to meet with those who were impacted in Putnam County, providing souvenirs and helping to distract from the aftermath. Two parents who lost their child in the tornado helped establish the Magnolia Foundation in 2023, which aimed to assist families in dealing with grief.

Country singer Jake Hoot, who was raised in Cookeville, released a song named 'Tennessee Strong', and announced that all proceeds made were given to impacted families.

Following the tornado, the Putnam County government and Cookeville's city government established a fund for those affected by the tornado.

Taylor Swift donated $1 million to the Middle Tennessee Emergency Response Fund in the wake of the tornado outbreak, and country duo Dan + Shay provided $100,000 to assist in recovery. Food City, alongside WCYB, WVLT, and WTVC established a six-day fundraiser for those impacted in Putnam County, and contributed $10,000. Home Federal Bank contributed $3,000, and by the end of the six days, $381,261 was raised, with 100% of the proceeds being given to the Cookeville-Putnam County Tornado Relief Fund. Research Electronics International (REI) announced that the company was going to donate $20,000 to the Cookeville-Putnam County Tornado Relief Fund. REI's parent company, HEICO, also made an announcement that it was going to donate an additional $20,000.

In the months following the tornado, $2.3 million raised by the Cookeville-Putnam County Tornado Relief Fund was distributed to 500 people who were impacted, with the last checks being handed out by the end of June.

Two years after the tornado, 70% of the houses that were destroyed had been rebuilt, and the majority of structures that sustained damage were repaired. By March 3, 2025, five years after the tornado, many areas were reportedly still recovering.

==== Federal aid and President Trump's visit ====
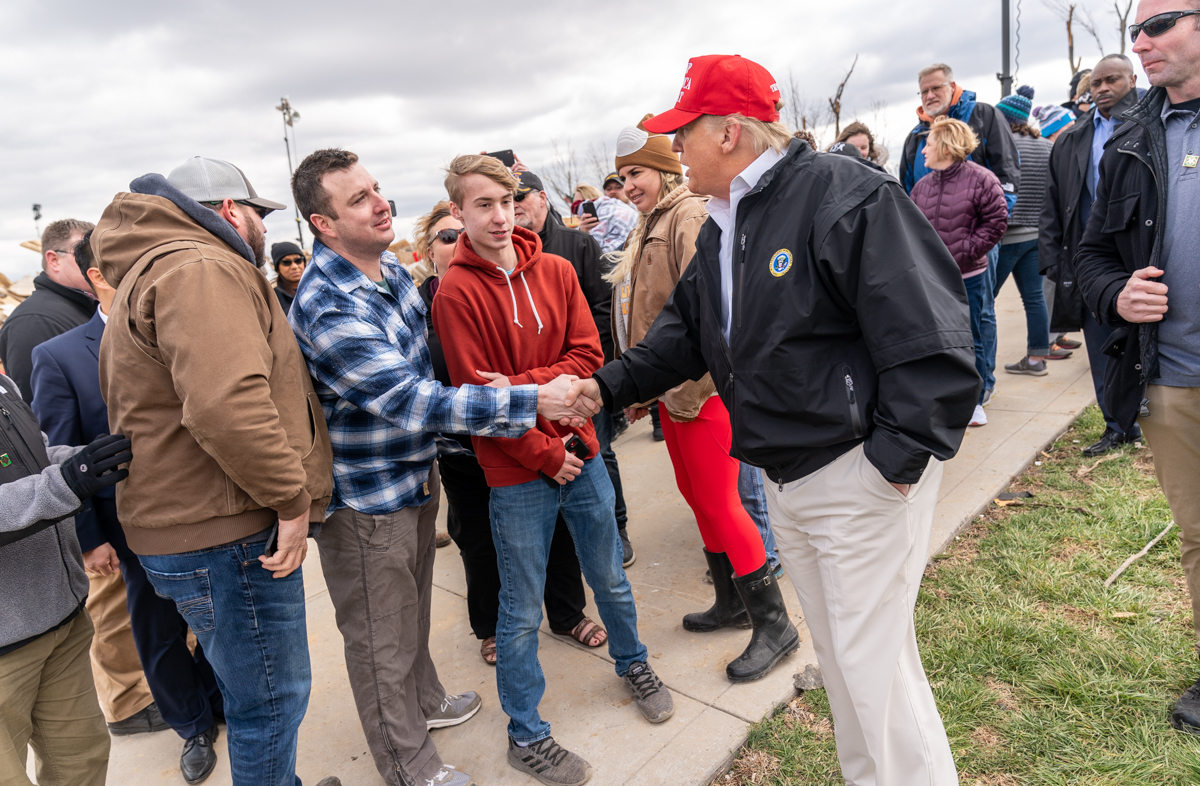
President Trump greeting tornado survivors in Cookeville

On March 6, 2020, President Donald Trump toured the affected areas from Marine One before meeting with Governor Bill Lee, senators Marsha Blackburn and Lamar Alexander, and other members of Tennessee's congressional delegation in Cookeville, and toured the damage from the ground within the hardest-hit areas. President Trump stated that the tornadoes were "vicious" and "horrible" and greeted survivors and first responders at a local church.

On March 25, 2020, the Federal Emergency Management Agency (FEMA) approved Governor Bill Lee's disaster declaration for the counties of Benton, Carroll, Davidson, Smith, Wilson, and Putnam following the storms within Tennessee. Affected individuals in certain areas received tax relief, and the impacted counties received assistance with repairing damaged infrastructure. On March 11, FEMA and the state of Tennessee opened a disaster recovery center in Cookeville, where individuals and businesses impacted by the tornado could find support.

=== Public reaction ===
On March 8, 2020, hundreds of people attended the funeral for the Kimberlins family, which consisted of a mother, father, and two-year-old child, all of whom were killed in the tornado. The family reportedly had ties all across the United States.

Two years after the tornado, Hope Park, which featured a playground, a pavilion named after the Kimberlin family, and a large green space, was established along McBroon Chapel Road on the lots of three former houses that were completely leveled, including one where the Kimberlin family of three perished. Within the park, 19 dogwood trees were planted in remembrance of all 19 individuals who were killed in the storm.

The Tree of Hope, as seen in Cookeville

Three years after the tornado, a sculpture named "Tree of Hope" was revealed within Cookeville's Dogwood Park. The sculptor stated that the birds represent the people who were killed by the tornado, and the leaves represent everyone who was injured. Additionally, toy cars and superhero figurines that are on the sculpture represent the objects found in the debris left behind by tornadoes.

Exactly five years after the tornado, a second memorial park was revealed, which featured a monument with 19 crosses engraved into it and an angel on top. A plaque with all the tornado victim's names listed and a monument honoring the volunteers and first responders were also present within the park.

=== Lack of warning ===
At 11:20 p.m. on March 2, 2020, a tornado watch was issued for portions of western and central Tennessee ahead of the outbreak. However, the watch did not extend to the Cookeville area, and the risk for EF2+ tornadoes was labeled as low. A tornado warning was issued for Cookevile at 1:48 a.m. on March 3, less than a minute before the tornado that ravaged the city's western neighborhoods touched down. Areas near the tornado's touchdown point had just a one-minute warning, and areas closer to downtown Cookeville had a seven-to-nine minute warning. Additionally, most residents were likely sleeping at the time of the tornado and were unaware of the severe weather.

=== Casualties ===
18 fatalities were initially attributed to the tornado. A man succumbed to his injuries on March 12, bringing the final death toll to 19, which consisted of 14 adults and five children under the age of 14. Twelve of the fatalities occurred in single-family residences, with five others occurring in mobile homes and two occurring within another type of permanent structure. Several residents who survived the tornado suffered from survivor's guilt. The tornado was responsible for 19 of the 24 fatalities during the outbreak. Additionally, 87 individuals sustained injuries from the tornado, several of which were severe. A two-year-old child sustained critical head injuries, and was released from the hospital over a month after the tornado. One individual was thrown 60 feet (18.3 m) and landed in a neighbors pool, sustaining bruises. A dog, who reportedly kept his owners awake and aware of the severe weather by barking during the night, was killed in the tornado.

The tornado was the worst on record to strike Putnam County, and remains the sixth deadliest tornado in Tennessee's history.

== See also ==
- Weather of 2020
- 2020 Nashville tornado – Another significant EF3 tornado from the same outbreak, which struck downtown Nashville
- 2012 Crittenden–Piner tornado – Another short-lived but violent EF4 tornado that impacted similar regions in northern Kentucky
- List of F4, EF4, and IF4 tornadoes
  - List of F4, EF4, and IF4 tornadoes (2020–present)
