= Tornadoes of 1957 =

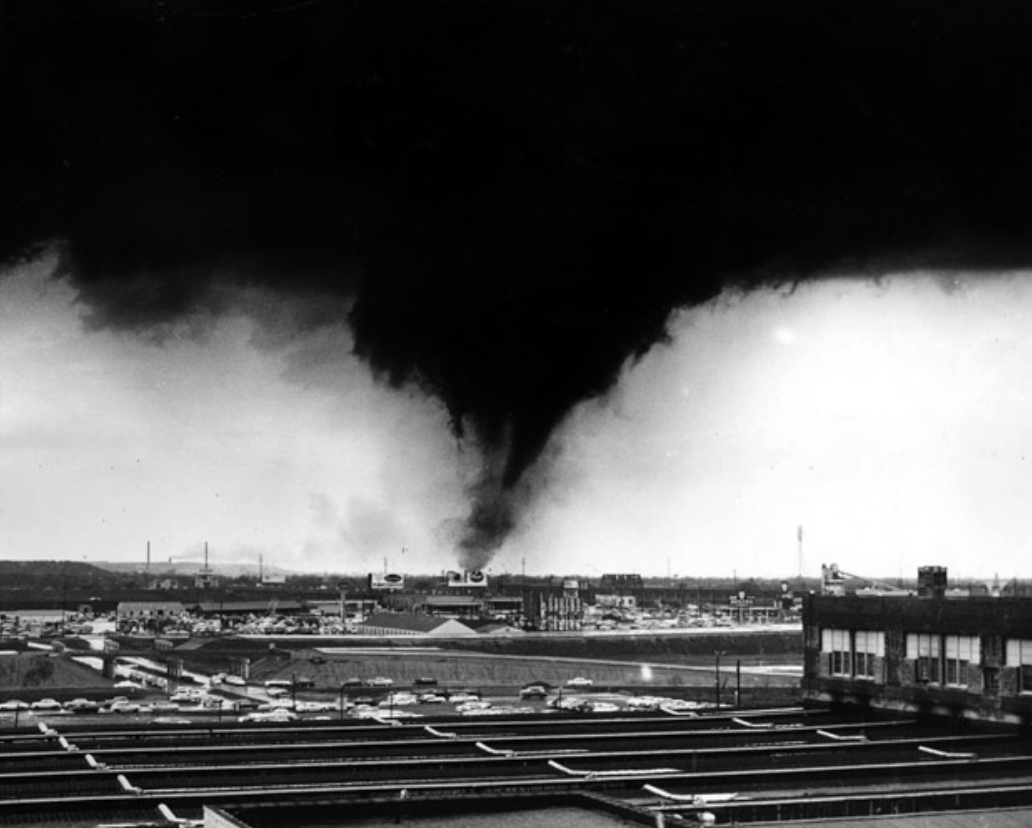
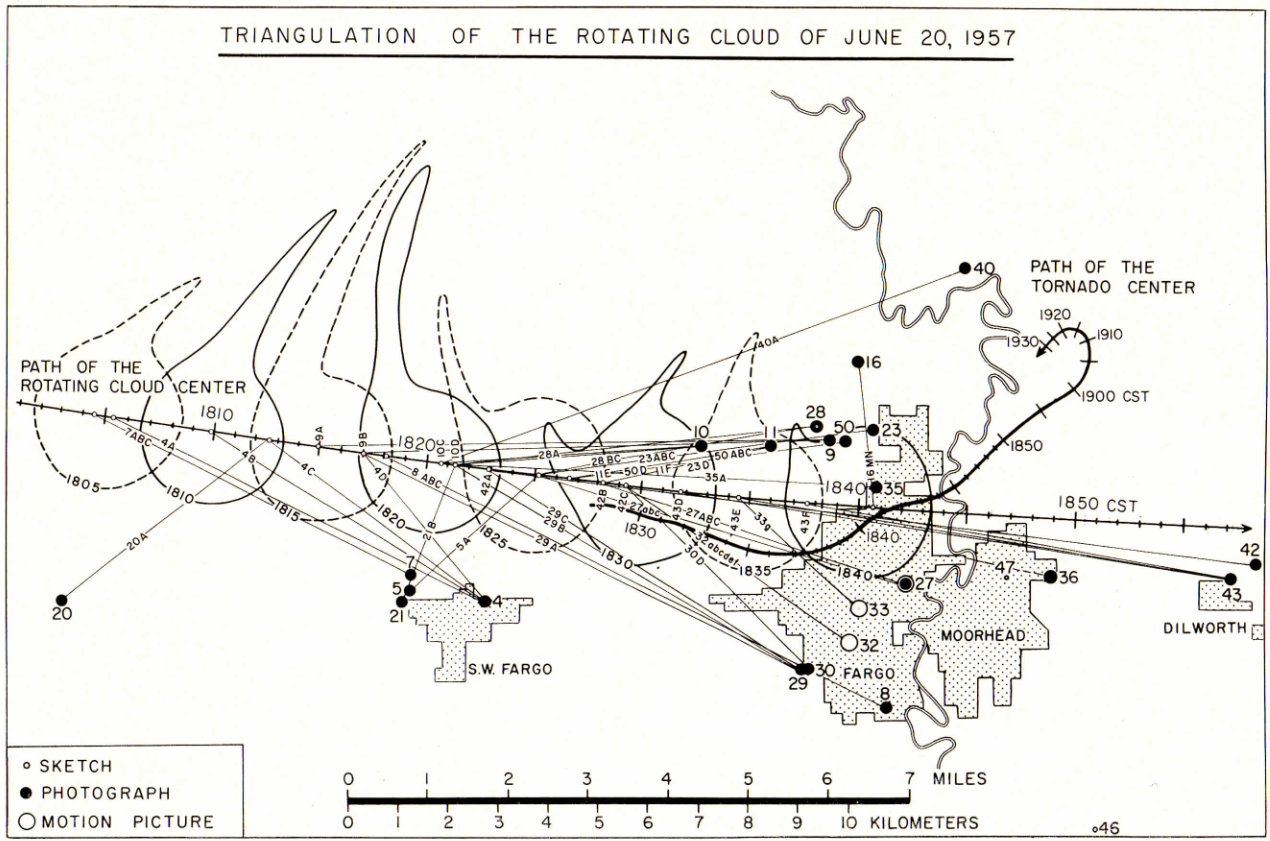
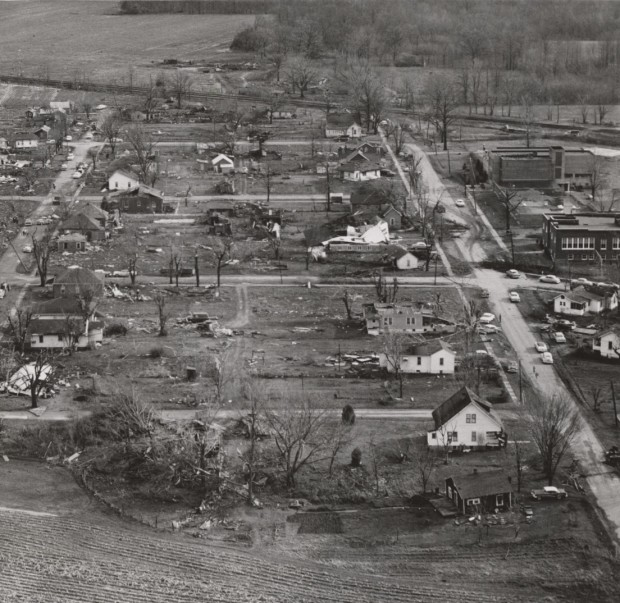
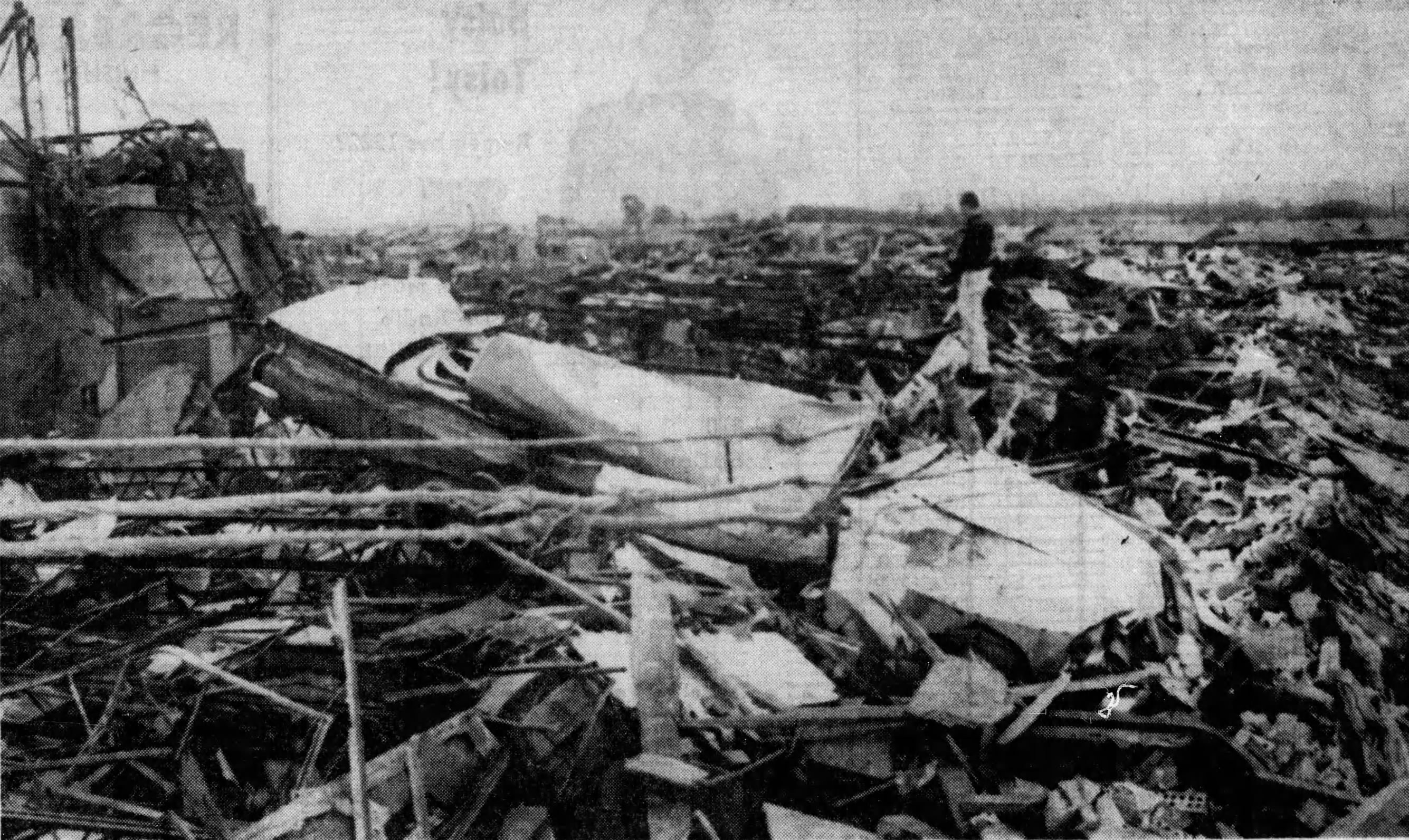
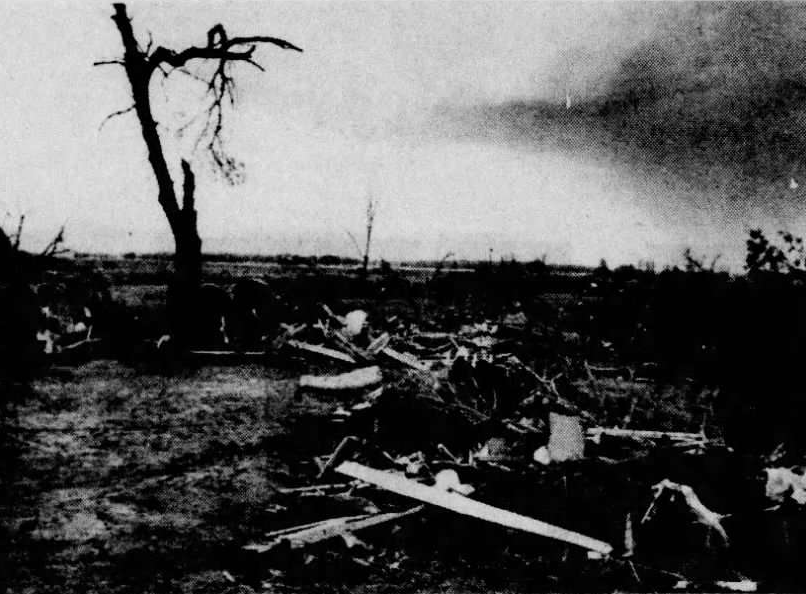
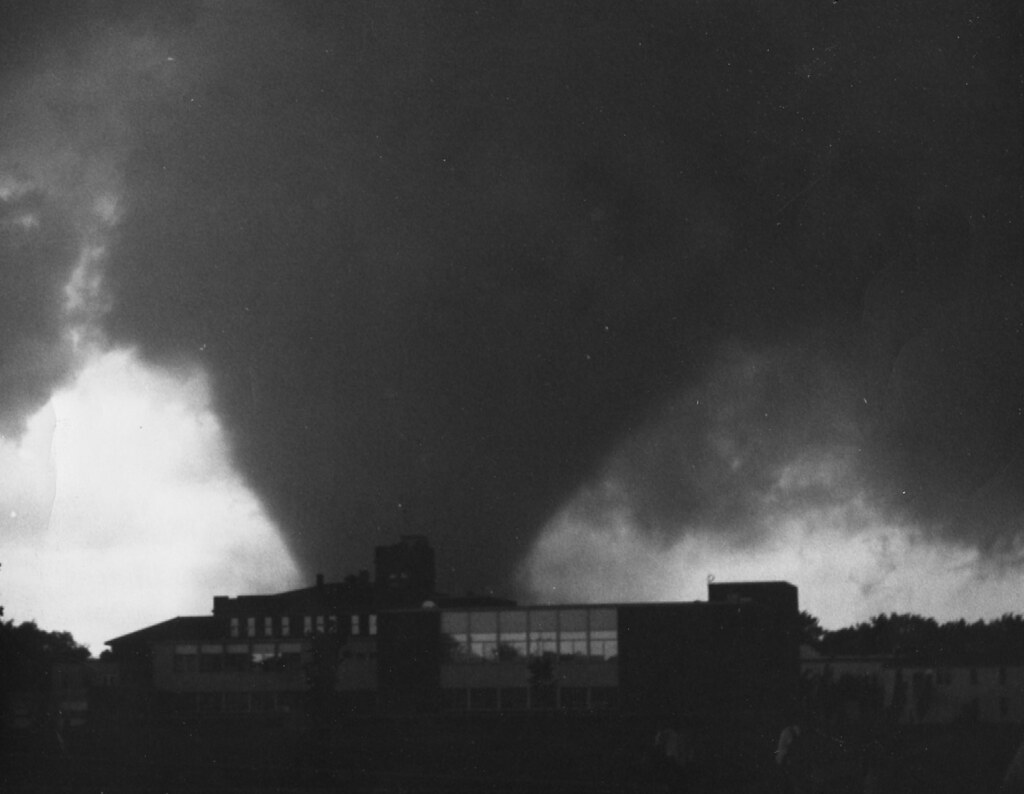
- Clockwise from top: An F3 tornado near Dallas, Texas on April 2; An aerial view of Gorham, Illinois after an F4 tornado on December 18; Violent damage to a farmstead near Rush City, Minnesota after an F4 tornado on May 21; An F5 tornado seen east of the N.D.A.C Memorial Student Union Building in Fargo, North Dakota on June 20; Violent damage to homes and vehicles in Ruskin Heights, Missouri after an F5 tornado on May 20; Ted Fujita's map showing the positions of a parent wall cloud as it produced the June 20 Fargo tornado.
- Timespan: 1957
- Maximum rated tornado: F5 tornado: Ruskin Heights, Missouri on May 20; Valle Scuropasso, Lombardy on June 16 (IF5); Fargo, North Dakota on June 20; Sunfield, Illinois on December 18
- Tornadoes in U.S.: 857
- Damage (U.S.): Unknown
- Fatalities (U.S.): 192
- Fatalities (worldwide): >205

This page documents the tornadoes and tornado outbreaks of 1957, primarily in the United States. Most tornadoes form in the U.S., although some events may take place internationally. Tornado statistics for older years like this often appear significantly lower than modern years due to fewer reports or confirmed tornadoes.

== Events ==
Fatal United States tornadoes in 1957
- Approximate touchdown location of killer tornadoes in 1957
Summary of tornadoes
- January 22 – Oklahoma (10 deaths)
- January 22 – Louisiana (3 deaths)
- March 17 – Texas (1 death)
- April 2 – Texas (10 deaths)
- April 2 – Oklahoma (1 death)
- April 2 – Oklahoma (2 deaths)
- April 2 – Oklahoma (3 deaths)
- April 2 – Texas (1 death)
- April 2 – Texas (1 death)
- April 4 – Mississippi (1 death)
- April 5 – Georgia (2 deaths)
- April 8 – Alabama (2 deaths)
- April 8 – Georgia (1 death)
- April 8 – South Carolina, North Carolina (4 deaths)
- April 19 – Wisconsin (1 death)
- April 25 – Nebraska (1 death)
- May 13 – Arkansas (1 death)
- May 15 – Texas (1 death)
- May 15 – Texas (21 deaths)
- May 20 – Kansas, Missouri (44 deaths)
- May 21 – Missouri (8 deaths)
- May 21 – Missouri (7 deaths)
- May 24 – Oklahoma (4 deaths)
- June 14 – Illinois (2 deaths)
- June 20 – North Dakota, Minnesota (10 deaths)
- June 20 – South Dakota (1 death)
- June 28 – Mississippi (1 death)
- September 14 – Oklahoma (2 deaths)
- October 15 – Louisiana (1 death)
- October 23 – Louisiana (1 death)
- November 7 – Louisiana (3 deaths)
- November 7 – Texas (2 deaths)
- November 7 – Mississippi (2 deaths)
- November 7 – Texas (1 death)
- November 7 – Louisiana (2 deaths)
- November 7 – Louisiana (4 deaths)
- November 17 – Mississippi (2 deaths)
- November 17 – Alabama (4 deaths)
- November 18 – Alabama (1 death)
- November 18 – Alabama (3 deaths)
- November 20 – Michigan (1 death)
- December 18 – Missouri (1 death)
- December 18 – Illinois (1 death)
- December 18 – Illinois (1 death)
- December 18 – Illinois (11 deaths)
- December 18 – Missouri (3 deaths)
- December 19 – Arkansas (2 deaths)
Total fatalities: 192

1957 was the most active tornado season on record at the time as multiple tornado outbreaks repeatedly hit the same areas. Texas was especially hard hit throughout the year. April and May both saw a record-breaking 200+ tornadoes with numerous outbreaks throughout the months.

=== United States yearly total ===
Confirmed tornadoes by Fujita rating
FU	F0	F1	F2	F3	F4	F5	Total
0	216	305	236	74	23	3	857

== January ==
There were 17 tornadoes confirmed in the US in January.

=== January 21–22 ===
FU	F0	F1	F2	F3	F4	F5
0	0	5	9	1	1	0

A tornado outbreak sequence of 16 tornadoes struck the US. The outbreak started on January 21, when a rare and destructive F1 tornado moved through areas north of Schofield Barracks, Hawaii. The next day, a large, long-tracked 1/4 mile wide F2 tornado moved through St. Louis, Wewoka, Wetumka, Weleetka, Henryetta, and Schulter, Oklahoma causing major damage along its 63.7 mile path. Later, a brief, but large, violent .5 mile-wide F4 tornado tore through the northeast side of Gans, Oklahoma, killing 10, injuring 20 and completely destroying many homes. This tornado also produced extreme ground scouring before entering into Gans, digging a trench up to 3 feet (0.91 m) deep in one instance. Another .5 mile-wide F2 tornado then tore through areas north of Bismarck, Arkansas. After that, an F3 tornado tore through areas northeast of Princeton, Louisiana in east-northeastern suburbs of Shreveport killing three and injuring nine. An F1 tornado then hit Kennett, Missouri, injuring one. The last tornado to cause casualties was a very narrow, but strong F2 tornado then tore through areas just south of Downtown Nashville, hitting the suburban town of Belle Meade, Tennessee near the beginning of its path, destroying a home and a church, damaging numerous other buildings, and injuring four people. Overall, the outbreak killed 13 and injured 31.

== February ==
There were 5 tornadoes confirmed in the US in February.

== March ==
There were 38 tornadoes confirmed in the US in March.

=== March 17 ===
FU	F0	F1	F2	F3	F4	F5
0	2	1	5	0	0	0

An outbreak of eight tornadoes hit the Southeastern Greater Houston and Beaumont-Port Arthur metropolitan area. It started with an F2 tornado that hit Santa Fe and Dickinson, injuring four. Later, a brief, but fatal F2 tornado hit the northwest side of Texas City, killing one and injuring seven. An F2 tornado moved over Galveston Bay near Goat Island, injuring four. The last tornado of the outbreak was an F2 storm in Groves. In the end, the outbreak in Texas killed one and injured 15.

=== March 20–21 ===
FU	F0	F1	F2	F3	F4	F5
0	0	2	0	3	0	0

Another outbreak of four tornadoes hit Texas on March 20. The first tornado of the outbreak was an F3 storm in rural Lee County that injured two. Minutes later, a mile-wide F3 tornado touched down just north of the previous one, injuring two when it the town of Dime Box. The next day, an isolated, but strong F3 tornado hit areas northwest of Montegut, Louisiana, injuring two. In the end, the outbreak injured six.

=== March 31 – April 1 ===
FU	F0	F1	F2	F3	F4	F5
0	1	8	6	0	0	0

Yet another outbreak of 12 tornadoes struck Texas and Louisiana, with three additional tornadoes in Alabama and Tennessee. On March 31, a half-mile wide F2 tornado hit the north-northwest side of the far northwestern San Antonio suburb of Boerne. Another F2 tornado then hit the north side of Austin. Yet another F2 tornado briefly touched down on the eastern side of the Northern Austin suburb of Round Rock. The fourth consecutive F2 tornado then moved directly through Huntsville, Texas, injuring two. Later, in Louisiana, an F2 tornado hit areas northwest of Lake Arthur. A large, 1000 yard wide F1 tornado struck areas northeast of Laplace. Another F1 tornado injured three in Boothville-Venice. In Alabama, an F1 tornado moved off of Mobile Bay and into the Eastern Mobile and Spanish Fort, injuring four. The next day, a brief, isolated, but strong F2 tornado hit the south side of Medon, Tennessee. In the end, a total of nine people were injured as a result of these tornadoes.

== April ==
There were 216 tornadoes confirmed in the US in April. This was the first time that over 200 tornadoes were confirmed in a single month in the US.

=== April 2–5 ===
FU	F0	F1	F2	F3	F4	F5
0	18	21	25	6	2	0

Yet another tornado outbreak hit Texas, Louisiana, Alabama, and Tennessee. However, this time it was part of a violent, destructive, and deadly outbreak sequence of 72 tornadoes that struck a large portion of the Midwest and the Southeast. On April 2, the first major tornado of the outbreak occurred in rural Grayson County, Texas, where a brief, but strong F2 tornado injured two. Later, an F3 tornado hit the west side of Melissa and Van Alstyne injuring four. This was followed by a well-documented multi-vortex F3 tornado that hit the north side of Dallas. The tornado was highly visible and hundreds of photos and videos were taken of it, allowing meteorologists to get a first-hand look at the characteristics of tornado like they had never seen before, making it one of the most studied tornadoes ever at the time. Unfortunately, it came at a heavy price; 10 people were killed, 200 were injured, and damages were estimated at $4 million.

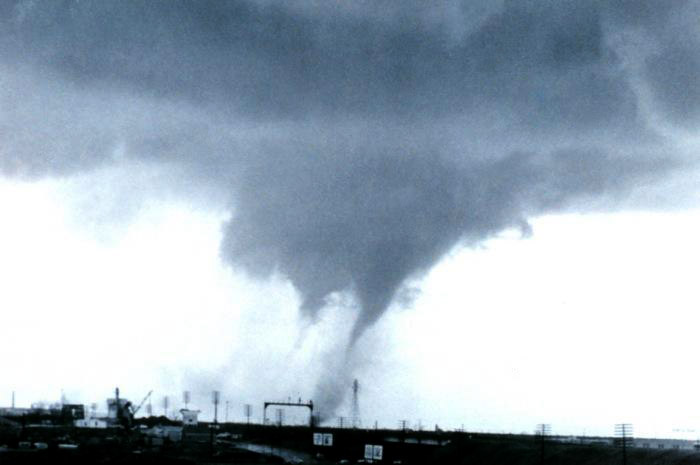
The 1957 Dallas tornado with multiple vortices observed at the time as it approached the city

Tornado activity continued into Oklahoma. A large, 600 yard wide F2 tornado killed one and injured two in rural Murray County. A violent F4 tornado then hit Lake Texoma State Park east of Kingston and south of Cumberland, killing two and injuring six. Another violent F4 tornado then tore directly through Calera and Durant, killing three and injuring three. Back in Texas, an F3 tornado injured one in rural Wise County and a brief, but fatal F2 tornado killed one and injured two west of Roxton.

Tornado activity continued into April 3. An F3 tornado hit Bono, Arkansas early that afternoon. Later, an F2 tornado hit Future City, Urbandale, and Golden Lily, Illinois, injuring five. An F1 tornado also injured four in rural Washington County, Mississippi.

April 4 saw fewer but a return of deadly tornado activity. Just after midnight back in Mississippi, a long-tracked F2 tornado hit Brooksville and Deerbrook, injuring four on its 40.7-mile path. This was followed by an even stronger F3 tornado that tore a path of destruction 40.2 miles long, hitting the towns of Magee and Montrose, killing one and injuring 75. Later, another F3 tornado hit Eastview, Tennessee, injuring 11.

April 5 saw a final day of weaker, but still deadly, tornado activity mainly during the early morning hours. A large, long-tracked F2 tornado moved through a large portion of Central Georgia, striking many communities south of Macon, including the northwestern side of Warner Robins, killing two and injuring five along its 75-mile path. This was the fourth destructive tornado to hit Warner Robins during the 1950s, with two of them occurring in 1953 while the other was in 1954. Later, another F2 tornado moved through the Southeastern Summit, Gilbert, and Northwestern Northwestern Lexington, South Carolina, injuring two. A brief F1 tornado injured one in rural Ware County, Georgia. North of East Stone Gap, Virginia in Northeastern Big Stone Gap, three people were injured by another brief F1 tornado. Another brief, but strong F2 tornado injured one southeast of Middletown, Indiana. The final tornado of the outbreak was an F1 storm that injured one southeast of Horneytown, North Carolina north of High Point.

In the end, the outbreak killed 21 and injured 338. However, the Dallas tornado led to revolutionary changes in the radar system and the engineering of structures to withstand the high winds of tornadoes. At the time, winds in the strongest tornadoes were estimated to be up to 700+ mph. The footage of the Dallas tornado, as well as wind engineering, not only disproved this but also helped to formulate more accurate wind speeds in tornadoes. This eventually led to the creation of the Fujita Scale to rate tornadoes.

=== April 7–8 (Southeastern United States) ===
FU	F0	F1	F2	F3	F4	F5
0	0	3	8	5	2	0

Another violent outbreak of 18 tornadoes struck the Southeast. It started on April 7, when an F2 tornado tore through Northwestern Waldron, Arkansas. The next morning in Alabama, a long-tracked F3 tornado hit Hamilton, Southern Haleyville, Ashridge, Grayson, and Southwestern Andrews Chapel, although there were no casualties along the 51.4 mile path. That was not the case when a second long-tracked F3 tornado tore through Southern Falkville (which had been hit two years earlier by an F4 tornado) and Apple Grove, killing two and injuring 90. A third F3 tornado hit the north sides of Joppa and Arab before moving onto Lake Guntersville.

That afternoon, an F2 tornado injured five in Calhoun, Georgia. Another F2 tornado hit Cross Keys, South Carolina before moving through rural Union County, injuring two. A large F3 tornado moved through the north side of Jacksonville, Georgia, killing one and injuring three. Later, a long-tracked F4 tornado family hit Jefferson, South Carolina before moving through Southern Laurinburg, St. Pauls, and Roseboro, North Carolina, killing four and injuring 70. An F1 tornado then hit the Norfolk Naval Base, injuring two. Another person was injured east of Benevolence, Georgia by F2 tornado. Later, a violent F4 tornado moved directly through Downtown Pembroke, North Carolina, injuring 21. The final tornado of the outbreak was a strong F3 tornado that injured 29 near Rose Hill and Magnolia, North Carolina. In the end, the outbreak killed seven and injured 223.

=== April 12 ===
FU	F0	F1	F2	F3	F4	F5
0	1	1	0	0	0	0

Two weak tornadoes struck Oregon. The first was an F1 tornado near Sandy. The F0 tornado then tracked an unusually long 16.2 miles through rural Gilliam and Morrow Counties. There were no casualties with either tornado.

=== April 18–27 ===
FU	F0	F1	F2	F3	F4	F5
0	36	39	30	8	4	0

An extremely active period of tornadoes took place towards the end of April as daily tornado outbreaks occurred for 10 straight days. The tornado outbreak sequence produced 117 tornadoes across an area from Colorado and New Mexico to New York.

The first major tornado occurred on April 18, when an F3 tornado hit rural Grayson County, Texas. The next day, all the casualties occurred in Wisconsin. A violent F4 tornado struck New Lisbon at the beginning of its path through Juneau County, killing one. Later, an F2 tornado hit Saxeville in Waushara County, injuring one. Another F2 tornado injured two on the south side of Burlington. A large F3 tornado also struck Glendale and Kendall. April 20 then saw a brief, but destructive F1 tornado injure one in Duncan, Oklahoma.

Tornado activity ramped again on April 21. A half-mile wide F4 tornado tore through Whitharral and Littlefield, Texas, injuring seven. Another F4 tornado hit Downtown Lubbock, injuring six. Both of these tornadoes moved in an odd northwest direction. A large outbreak of 26 tornadoes struck the Great Plains on April 22, although the only tornado to cause casualties was an F3 tornado that injured one in Carnegie, Oklahoma. After two weak tornadoes touched down on April 23, an outbreak of 11 tornadoes hit Indiana and Texas on April 24 with 10 of them in the later state. Again, only the strongest tornado caused casualties: a half-mile wide F3 tornado passed southeast of Elgin, Texas, injuring one.

A widespread outbreak of 15 tornadoes occurred on April 25. In Nebraska, a long-tracked F4 tornado struck Milford, Northwestern Lincoln, Ashland, and Southwestern Omaha, killing one and injuring eight on its 89.8 mile path. Later, another long-tracked F3 tornado moved through rural Clay and Fillmore Counties. In Arkansas, another F3 tornado hit the south side of Jonesboro. The next day, 15 more tornadoes touched down, mostly in the early morning hours in Texas. An F3 tornado hit Kilgore with no casualties. The final tornado to cause casualties then hit Tyler at F2 strength, injuring six. Another F3 tornado then touched down and moved in an odd southwestward direction, striking the towns of Longview, Kilgore, and Laird Hill. The final tornado of the outbreak was an F2 tornado that hit Carlyss, Louisiana on April 27.

In the end, the destructive outbreak sequence killed two and injured 33.

=== April 30 ===
FU	F0	F1	F2	F3	F4	F5
0	0	1	1	0	0	0

An F1 tornado hit Orange, Texas, causing considerable damage. Just over six hours later, a rare F2 tornado struck Yakima, Washington, which also caused considerable damage. Neither tornado caused any casualties.

== May ==
There were 227 tornadoes confirmed in the US in May.

=== May 6 ===
FU	F0	F1	F2	F3	F4	F5
0	1	0	1	0	0	0

Two rare tornadoes touched down in Washington. The first was an F0 tornado south of Harrington. The second was an F2 tornado in rural Spokane County. There were no casualties from the tornadoes.

=== May 12–17 ===
FU	F0	F1	F2	F3	F4	F5
0	13	22	10	4	1	0

Another large outbreak sequence of 50 tornadoes struck areas from Kansas and Texas to Ohio and Florida. It started on May 12, when an F2 tornado touched down in rural McLennan County, Texas. The next day, the worst tornadoes occurred in Arkansas. An F2 tornado injured one in the town of Ashdown. Another person was injured by another F2 tornado Mineral Springs. Later, a half-mile wide F3 tornado hit Friendship, Midway, Western Abco, Western Malvern, and Southern Rockport. A catastrophic F3 tornado struck Conway, Wooster, Republican, and Twin Groves, killing one and injuring 18. Later, an F2 tornado injured one south of Oxford.

May 14 saw a brief, but strong F2 tornado injure three just east of Wooster, Ohio on the western side of Honeytown. The next day proved to be the worst day of the outbreak sequence as 12 tornadoes pummeled Texas and Oklahoma, with nine of them occurring in the Texas Panhandle, most of which were significant (F2+). An F3 tornado injured one in rural Donley County. Another F3 tornado then slammed Vigo Park. Later, a surprisingly fatal F0 tornado killed one while moving in an odd northwestward trajectory in rural Floyd County. The most catastrophic tornado then struck: a violent F4 tornado touched down right over Silverton, obliterating it and areas northeast of town in rural Briscoe County, killing 21 and injuring 80.

A total of 13 additional tornadoes touched down between May 16 and 17, but most were weak and none of them caused any casualties. In the end, the outbreak sequence killed 23 people and injured 105.

=== May 19–22 ===
FU	F0	F1	F2	F3	F4	F5
0	13	16	18	7	3	1

On May 19, a brief, but rare F1 tornado struck the east-southeast side of West Park, California in the southwestern suburbs of Fresno, kicking off a violent outbreak of 59 tornadoes across the Great Plains and Midwest. The next day started with a weak, but unusually long-tracked F0 tornado that struck Burlington, Colorado and areas west of St. Francis, Kansas along a 70.1-mile path. Later, a large, long-tracked F4 tornado struck Huscher, Kansas along a 44.6-mile path. Later, an F3 tornado hit Rice, Kansas in rural Cloud County. The worst tornado then touched down southwest of Williamsburg, Kansas and moved northeast, becoming a large, long-tracked, .25-mile-wide F5 tornado. It struck Southern Ottawa, before striking South Kansas City, Missouri, and Ruskin Heights, killing 44 and injuring 207 along its 69.4-mile path. Another F3 tornado hit rural Franklin County, striking areas that the F5 tornado had hit just an hour earlier. Later, the final tornado of the day struck Tamaha and Sallisaw, Oklahoma at F3 strength, injuring one.

More casualties and destruction occurred the next day. An F4 tornado passed near Harris, and Rush City, Minnesota just east of the border with Wisconsin, injuring two. In Missouri, a .25-mile-wide F3 tornado then struck the town of Doss, injuring another two. Later, another large, destructive F3 tornado hit Belgrade, Irondale, Leadwood, and Desloge, killing seven and injuring 50. A larger and stronger, 500-yard wide F4 tornado tore through the rural towns of Fremont (where F5 damage may have occurred) and Van Buren killing seven and injuring 75. Later, a large F2 tornado hit Monticello injuring two. In Illinois, an F3 tornado struck Alto Pass and Makanda before another F3 tornado impacted Good Hope. A brief, but strong F2 tornado then injured two in rural Warrick County, Indiana. On May 22, an F3 tornado injured four west of Malone, Texas. After that, an F1 tornado injured two in rural Ellis County, Texas. Later, another F1 tornado injured one in rural Bossier Parish, Louisiana.

In the end, 11 states saw tornadoes in this outbreak sequence. There were 59 fatalities and 341 injuries.

=== May 23 ===
FU	F0	F1	F2	F3	F4	F5
0	2	1	1	1	0	0

Between the two outbreaks, five tornadoes touched down on May 23. There were no casualties, although the final tornado of the day caused F3 damage as it passed directly through Monticello, Arkansas.

=== May 24–25 ===
FU	F0	F1	F2	F3	F4	F5
0	15	18	8	3	1	0

Yet another outbreak of 45 tornadoes affected the Great Plains. On May 24 in Texas, an F3 tornado injured three near Muleshoe. A long-tracked F3 then hit Tahoka, Wilson, Slaton, and Ralls in the southern to eastern suburbs of Lubbock, injuring one. Later, another F3 tornado injured one northeast of Lenoran. Tornado activity continued into Oklahoma, where the worst tornado of the outbreak touched down. It was a half-mile wide F4 tornado that moved through areas west of Cookietown and Geronimo before striking Southern Lawton, killing four and injuring five. It was the last tornado to cause casualties. A long-tracked .25-mile-wide F2 tornado then struck Wynnewood and areas west of Macomb as the general strength of the tornadoes dropped off that evening and the next day. The worst tornado from May 25 was a large F2 tornado that caused considerable damage Bloomington, and Fennimore, Wisconsin. In the end, there were four fatalities and 10 injuries from the outbreak.

== June ==
There were 147 tornadoes confirmed in the US in June.

=== June 14 ===
FU	F0	F1	F2	F3	F4	F5
0	0	7	3	1	1	0

An all-day outbreak of 12 deadly tornadoes struck the Midwest with all of the casualties occurring in Illinois. An F2 tornado struck Rockport, Summer Hill, Time, and Milton, injuring one. Another F2 tornado hit Eastern Jacksonville. This was followed by the worst tornado of the outbreak: an F4 tornado struck the suburban town of Southern View just barely south of Downtown Springfield, killing two and injuring 50. That evening, two brief, but strong tornadoes touched down in Indiana with an F3 tornado hitting areas west of Rochester and an F2 tornado striking northeast of Pierceton. Overall, the outbreak killed two and injured 56.

=== June 16 (Italy) ===
Two intense tornadoes struck southern Lombardy near Pavia. The first was an IF3 that devastate the small village of Robecco Pavese. Shortly After the dissipation of this tornado, a second even more violent tornado struck the comune of Vallescuropasso in the Appennino hills, flattening many large stone buildings. The two tornadoes killed six people (all from Vallescuropasso tornado) and injured 80. The tornado was later upgraded to IF5.

=== June 20–23 ===
FU	F0	F1	F2	F3	F4	F5
0	9	7	5	1	0	1

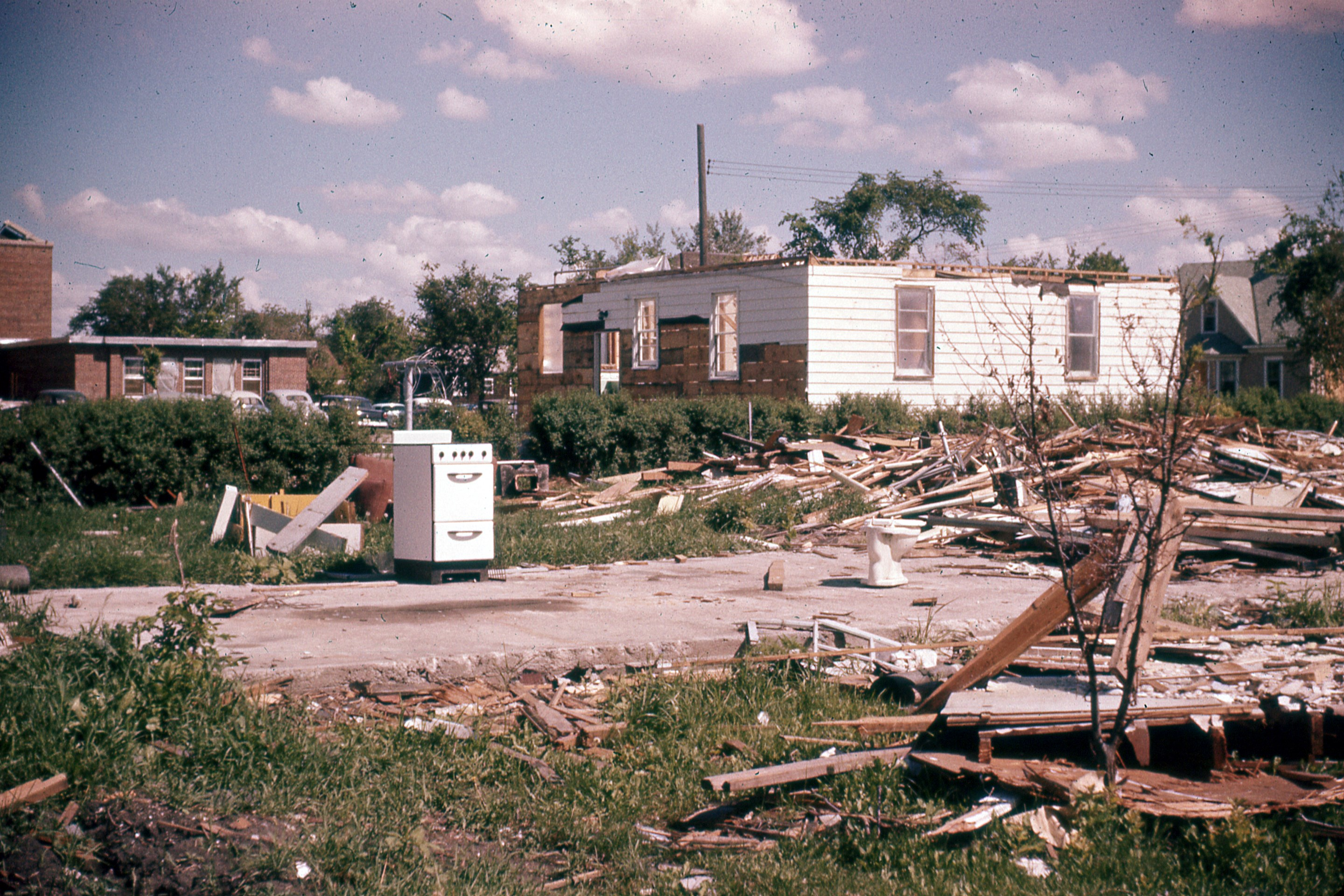
A home that was leveled and mostly swept away by the F5 Fargo tornado.

A deadly outbreak sequence of 23 tornadoes hit the Great Plains and the Great Lakes. It started on June 20 in North Dakota with an F2 tornado south of Oake, North Dakota. Later, a large, violent, and catastrophic 500-yard-wide F5 tornado family hit Fargo. It started in Wheatland and moved very slowly just south due east, damaging the towns of Casselton, Mapleton, and West Fargo. It then moved directly through Downtown Fargo, devastating the area. It then continued east into Minnesota, moving directly through Moorhead, Dilworth, Glyndon and Hawley before dissipating south of Winnipeg Junction. The tornado family of at least five tornadoes traveled for 52.4 miles, killing 10 (some sources say 12) and injuring 103. The day ended with another fatal F2 tornado that killed one in rural Spink County, South Dakota.

The next two day featured more scattered, but strong tornado activity. On June 21, an F3 tornado caused major damage as it moved through the north sides of Waco and Utica, Nebraska. Later, just before midnight, a large F1 tornado struck the Southwestern Kansas City suburb of Zarah, Kansas, injuring two. Then, right at midnight the next day, an F2 tornado moved through Eastern Kansas City before striking the northeastern suburban towns of Birmingham and Liberty, Missouri, although there were no casualties. That afternoon, a brief, but strong F2 tornado that moved directly through Hudsonville, Michigan, causing extensive damage. This came just over a year after an F5 tornado caused catastrophic damage to the south side of town. The final strong tornado of the outbreak was another brief F2 tornado that hit the southwest side of Bay City, Michigan, although additional weak tornadoes were confirmed into the early morning hours of June 23.

In the end, the outbreak as a whole killed 11 and injured 105.

=== June 27–28 ===
FU	F0	F1	F2	F3	F4	F5
0	6	8	9	1	0	0

The Mississippi Valley was the target of a two-day outbreak sequence of 24 tornadoes, most of which were caused by the passage of Hurricane Audrey. The first major tornado occurred on June 27 when an F2 tornado tore through Philadelphia, Mississippi, injuring nine. Just after midnight the next morning, a fatal F3 tornado struck Brooksville, Mississippi, killing one and injuring 10. A six-hour lull then followed before tornadic activity ramped up again, starting with an F2 tornado that hit Waynesboro, Mississippi.

Activity then shifted into Alabama, where 14 tornadoes touched down with 13 of them occurring within the span of three hours. A half-mile wide F2 tornado caused major damage in Centerville and McKenzie. Another F2 tornado then hit Frisco City and Southeastern Monroeville, injuring four. This was followed by an F1 tornado that hit Fort Deposit and Sandy Ridge, injuring eight. Later, another F2 tornado moved through areas east of McKenzie, injuring two. That afternoon, another F2 tornado injured one in rural Barbour County. The final tornado of the day then occurred just over three hours later, when a brief, but damaging F1 tornado touched down southeast of Cross Plains, Indiana.

Overall, the outbreak sequence caused one fatality and 36 injuries.

== July ==
There were 55 tornadoes confirmed in the US in July.

=== July 3–5 ===
FU	F0	F1	F2	F3	F4	F5
0	2	9	7	0	1	0

An outbreak sequence of 19 tornadoes impacted mainly the northern half of the US. The first tornado occurred on July 3 when a brief, but destructive F1 tornado injured one in Luverne, Minnesota. Early the next morning, another person was injured by a brief F1 tornado in Boyer, Iowa. Just under four hours later, the first strong F2 tornado of the outbreak caused major damage southeast of Haugen and west of Brill, Wisconsin injuring four. That afternoon, a violent F4 tornado tore through the Northern Detroit suburbs of Wixom, Farmington Hills, Franklin, Bingham Farms, present-day Beverly Hills, Berkley and Clawson, Michigan, injuring six. More tornades occurred into the next day, with the final one being a destructive F2 tornado in Leominster, Massachusetts.

In the end, the tornadoes injured 13.

== August ==
There were 20 tornadoes confirmed in the US in August.

=== August 4 ===
A rare, strong F3 tornado tracked 12 miles through rural areas near Sentinel, Arizona. A service station was damaged, but there were no casualties. This tornado was not rated as significant by Grazulis.

=== August 17 ===
An F2 tornado struck Corsicana, Texas, flattening a concrete block drive-in theater screen, but causing no casualties. This tornado was not rated as significant by Grazulis.

=== August 29 ===
A F0 tornado caused major damage to rural areas near Sentinel, Arizona, which had been hit by an F3 tornado just 25 days earlier. A filling station was unroofed and houses were damaged. Again, there were no casualties.

== September ==
There were 17 tornadoes confirmed in the US in September.

=== September 14 ===
FU	F0	F1	F2	F3	F4	F5
0	1	0	1	0	1	0

Three tornadoes struck areas southeast of Oklahoma City. The first was a violent, long-tracked, .25 mile wide F4 tornado that moved through Wanette, Asher, Southern Wewoka, and Wetumka, killing two and injuring six on its 67.5 mile path. A short-lived, but strong F2 tornado then injured three on the north side of Bethel Acres. The third and final tornado was a brief, weak F0 tornado east of Yeager. In the end, the three Oklahoma tornadoes killed two and injured nine.

=== September 21 ===
FU	F0	F1	F2	F3	F4	F5
0	0	1	1	0	0	0

An F2 tornado tracked through the Western Flint suburbs of Owosso, Caledonia Township, Southern Juddville, Northern Flushing, and Western Mount Morris Township, Michigan with no casualties. This was not the case in Erie, Pennsylvania, where an F1 tornado moved directly through downtown, injuring three.

=== September 23 (Japan) ===
At least one destructive tornado struck Tomiye City in the Nagasaki Prefecture of Japan. There were six fatalities and eight injuries.

== October ==
There were 18 tornadoes confirmed in the US in October.

=== October 14–16 ===
FU	F0	F1	F2	F3	F4	F5
0	0	3	3	3	0	0

An outbreak of nine tornadoes hit Texas, Louisiana, Mississippi. On October 14, an F3 tornado struck areas north of Prairie View, Texas. The next evening, a catastrophic F3 tornado struck Northern Leonville, Northern Krotz Springs, and Northwestern Fordoche, Louisiana, killing one and injuring 29. These were the only casualties of the outbreak. Right before midnight going into October 16, another F3 tornado hit Bovina, Mississippi. Overall, as stated earlier, the outbreak killed one and injured 29.

=== October 22–23 ===
FU	F0	F1	F2	F3	F4	F5
0	0	0	2	1	0	0

A small, but destructive series of three tornadoes impacted Texas and Louisiana. On October 22, an early-morning F3 tornado injured one in rural Liberty County, Texas. The next morning in Louisiana, a deadly F2 tornado hit Wilson Point, Center Point, and Southern Deville, killing one and injuring another. That afternoon, the final F2 tornado passed between Foley and Napoleonville with no casualties. Overall, the three tornadoes left one dead and two injured.

== November ==
There were 59 tornadoes confirmed in the US in November.

=== November 7–8 ===
FU	F0	F1	F2	F3	F4	F5
0	0	10	2	7	1	0

A large, deadly outbreak of 20 tornadoes hit the Southeastern United States. It started in Louisiana on November 7, when an F2 tornado hit Southeastern Shreveport and Western Haughton. Later, an F3 tornado injured five northwest of Red River Landing. Tornadic activity then picked tremendously that evening and overnight with catastrophic results. An F3 tornado struck Boyce, the England Air Force Base and Southwestern Alexandria, killing three and injuring 16. Another F3 tornado then hit Groves and Atreco, Texas, killing two and injuring 59. After that, yet another F3 tornado hit Northwestern Port Arthur and Groves, injuring one. A fourth F3 tornado, this one long-tracked, then killed two and injured one in rural Holmes and Carroll Counties in Mississippi. Later, a catastrophic, violent F4 tornado hit Orange, West Orange, Bridge City, and Atreco, Texas, killing one and injuring 81. Orange had already been considerably damaged earlier in the year by an F1 tornado on April 30, but this one was more destructive. Later on, a weak but deadly F1 tornado killed one and injured 13 in Carencro, Louisiana. At the same time, an F3 tornado killed one and injured 10 in Cankton, Louisiana.

Early the next morning, an F1 tornado passed through Philadelphia, and Bogue Chitto, Mississippi, injuring three. An F2 tornado then hit Pulaski, Tennessee, although there were no casualties. Another F1 tornado then injured five east of Aliceville, Alabama. Later that afternoon after lull in activity, the final tornado, another strong, long-tracked F3 tornado, tore through Crisp, Southern Conetoe, Northern Bethel, Gold Point, and Quitsna, North Carolina, injuring five on its 46.9 mile path.

In the end, the violent outbreak caused 14 fatalities and 199 injuries.

=== November 16–19 ===
FU	F0	F1	F2	F3	F4	F5
0	1	15	11	2	2	0

Another large outbreak of 32 tornadoes struck the Southeastern United States before moving into the Northeast. It started early on November 16, when an isolated but strong F3 tornado injured one in rural Sabine Parish, Louisiana. The next day, five tornadoes touched down, almost all of which were significant. An F2 tornado caused severe damage in Brooksville, Mississippi, killing two and injuring two. This came just under five months after Hurricane Audrey produced an F3 tornado that killed one and injured 10 in the same area. Later, a violent F4 tornado, which moved in an odd west-northwest direction, tore through areas north of Manchester, Alabama, killing four and injuring 15. An F1 tornado then injured three in rural Cullman County, Alabama before an F2 tornado hit Southern Fort Worth, injuring two.

November 18 was the most violent day of the outbreak as 23 tornadoes touched down across six hours. That morning in Mississippi, an F2 tornado moved through Holcut and Iuka, injuring two. Another F2 tornado then injured two on the southeast sides of Errata and Sandersville that afternoon. Later, an F3 tornado caused severe damage in De Soto. In Alabama, an F1 tornado struck the towns of Forkland, Sawyerville, and Havana, injuring five. Another F1 tornado injured one in rural Cullman County.

Tornadic activity became more severe and deadly into the evening hours. An F2 tornado slammed through Pickwick, Cheraw, Natcole, and Columbia, injuring two. A disastrous F2 tornado then hit the Northeastern Birmingham suburbs of Fultondale and Southern Center Point, Alabama, killing one and injuring 35. Another F2 tornado injured two in rural Fentress County, Tennessee. Later, a violent F4 tornado tore through Susan Moore, Snead, Douglas, Horton, and Albertville, Alabama, killing three and injuring 12. The next day, which would be the final day of the outbreak, featured three tornadoes in Pennsylvania and New Jersey. The strongest one was an F2 tornado that hit Palmyra, Pennsylvania.

In all, nine states were impacted during this outbreak. A total of 10 people were killed and 84 others were injured.

=== November 20 ===
Just a day after the previous outbreak ended, an isolated, but strong F3 tornado tore through Highland Park, Michigan north of Detroit, killing one and injuring 12.

== December ==
There were 38 tornadoes confirmed in the US in December.

=== December 18–20 ===
FU	F0	F1	F2	F3	F4	F5
0	0	8	16	9	3	1

The final 37 tornadoes of the year came in an unusually intense December outbreak sequence in the Midwest and South with Missouri and Illinois bearing the brunt of the destruction. It started in Missouri on December 18, when an F1 tornado injured one in Truxton. This was followed by fatal F2 tornado that killed one and injured another northeast of Knob Lick. Later, in Illinois, three straight tornadoes, an F2 storm on the north side of the Northeastern St. Louis suburb of Roxanne, a brief F1 tornado in Mason City, and an F3 tornado in rural Perry County, each injured one.

Tornado activity became much more violent going into the mid-afternoon hours. Following the previous Illinois F3 tornado, an F2 tornado moved through areas north of Boyd before striking Southern Dix, injuring two. A violent F4 tornado then tore directly through Mt. Vernon as well as Camp Ground, killing one and injuring 45. Later, an extremely violent F5 tornado obliterated Sunfield, killing one and injuring six. The damage was so severe that the town essentially vanished and was later rebuilt south of its original location. Next, a violent and deadly F4 tornado struck Gorham, Southeastern Sand Ridge, Murphyboro, De Soto, Hurst, Bush and Southwestern Plumfield, killing 11 and injuring 200. The path of this tornado was eerily similar to the 1925 Tri-State tornado.

Strong tornadoes continued to wreak havoc in the two states going into the evening hours. At the same time the F4 tornado was down, a large, 700 yard wide F2 tornado tore through Millersville and Pocahontas, Missouri, injuring one. An F3 tornado then moved through rural Wayne and Clay Counties before striking Southern Clay City, Illinois, injuring one. Later, a destructive, F2 tornado killed three and injured one in Chaffee, Missouri. Another F2 tornado then tore through Carbondale, Illinois, injuring five. Later on, a back-to-back F3 tornado in Dahlgren, Illinois and Bungay and Springerton, Illinois injured three and four respectfully.

Tornado activity continued into December 19, with 10 more tornadoes touching down. A violent F4 tornado tore through Northwestern McNeil and Spring Hill, Arkansas, killing two and injuring nine. A brief but destructive F1 tornado injured two in Milan, Tennessee. The final tornado of the day, as well as the last one to cause casualties, was another brief but strong F2 tornado that injured seven in Littleville, Alabama just before midnight. Two additional weak F1 tornadoes touched down in Alabama during the early morning hours of December 20 before the outbreak sequence came to an end.

In the end, five states were impacted by tornadoes, with 28 of them occurring in Missouri and Illinois alone. A total of 19 people were killed and 291 others were injured as a result of this outbreak.

== See also ==
- Tornado
  - Tornadoes by year
  - Tornado records
  - Tornado climatology
  - Tornado myths
- List of tornado outbreaks
  - List of F5 and EF5 tornadoes
  - List of North American tornadoes and tornado outbreaks
  - List of 21st-century Canadian tornadoes and tornado outbreaks
  - List of European tornadoes and tornado outbreaks
  - List of tornadoes and tornado outbreaks in Asia
  - List of Southern Hemisphere tornadoes and tornado outbreaks
  - List of tornadoes striking downtown areas
  - List of tornadoes with confirmed satellite tornadoes
- Tornado intensity
  - Fujita scale
  - Enhanced Fujita scale
