= 1957 Ruskin Heights tornado =

F5 tornado in the midwestern United States

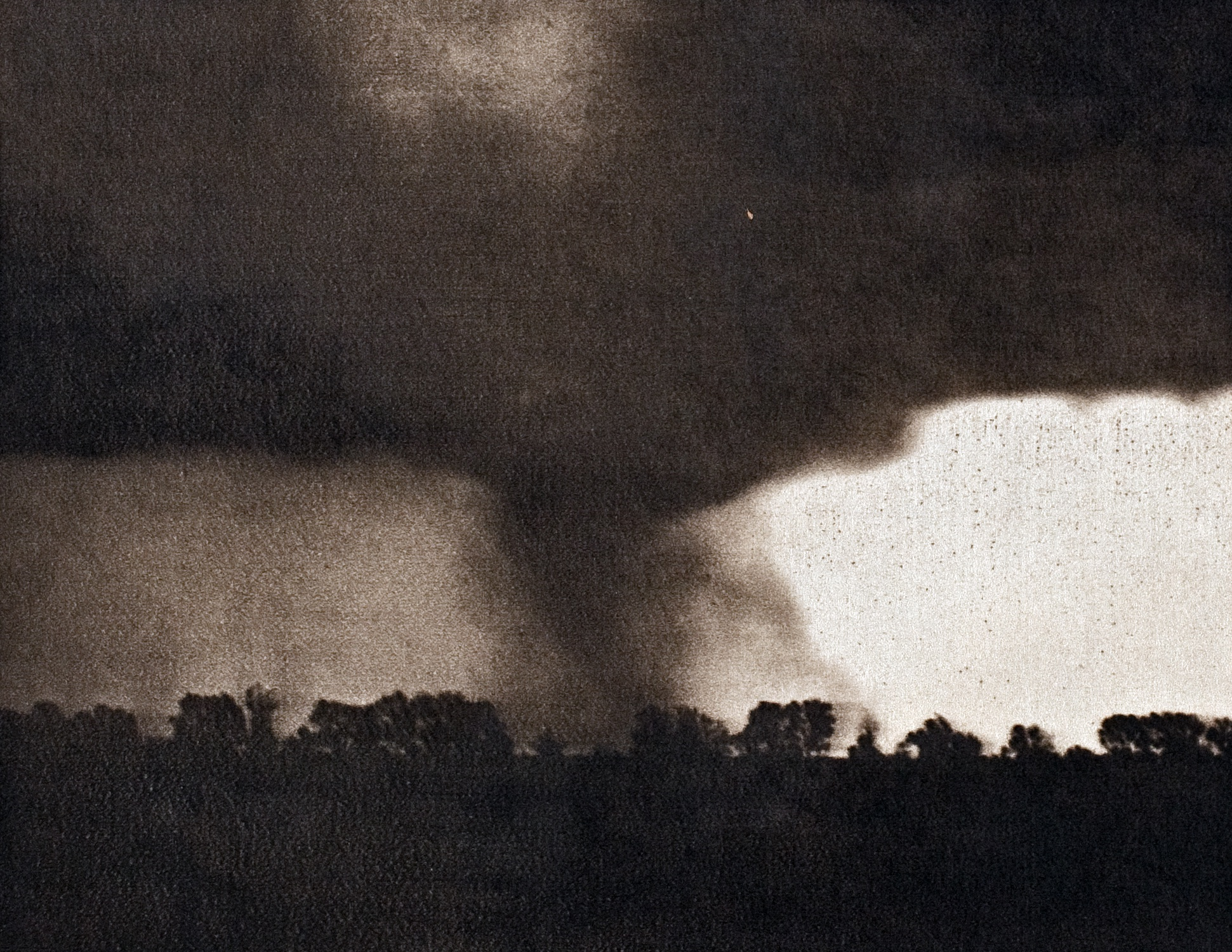
- The tornado near peak intensity as it approached Martin City, Missouri

Meteorological history
- Formed: May 20, 1957, 7:15 p.m. CDT (UTC−05:00)
- Dissipated: May 20, 1957, 8:53 p.m. CDT (UTC−05:00)
- Duration: 1 hour and 38 minutes

F5 tornado
- on the Fujita scale
- Highest winds: >261 mph (420 km/h)

Overall effects
- Fatalities: 44
- Injuries: 531
- Damage: $2,500,000 ($28,660,000 in 2025 USD)
- Areas affected: Franklin County, Kansas and Jackson County, Missouri, especially Ruskin Heights
- Part of the tornado outbreaks of 1957 and the tornado outbreak of May 19–22, 1957

In the evening hours of May 20, 1957, a large, long-tracked and deadly tornado moved through portions of eastern Kansas and western Missouri, killing forty-four people and injuring over five hundred. The tornado is the deadliest to strike the Kansas City metropolitan area, and was the deadliest worldwide in 1957. The tornado was rated F5 on the Fujita scale, the first of three worldwide in 1957 to receive this rating.

The tornado touched down near Williamsburg at 7:15 p.m., headed northeast. As the tornado neared Homewood, it took on a multi-vortex shape and lofted gravestones in the air. As it passed near Spring Hill, the tornado leveled numerous buildings and killed seven people before crossing state lines into Missouri, where the worst damage was observed in the Martin City area. The tornado left an estimated eighty-five percent of Martin City "uninhabitable", and killed another thirty-seven people before dissipating at 8:53 p.m., over an hour after touching down.

== Meteorological synopsis ==
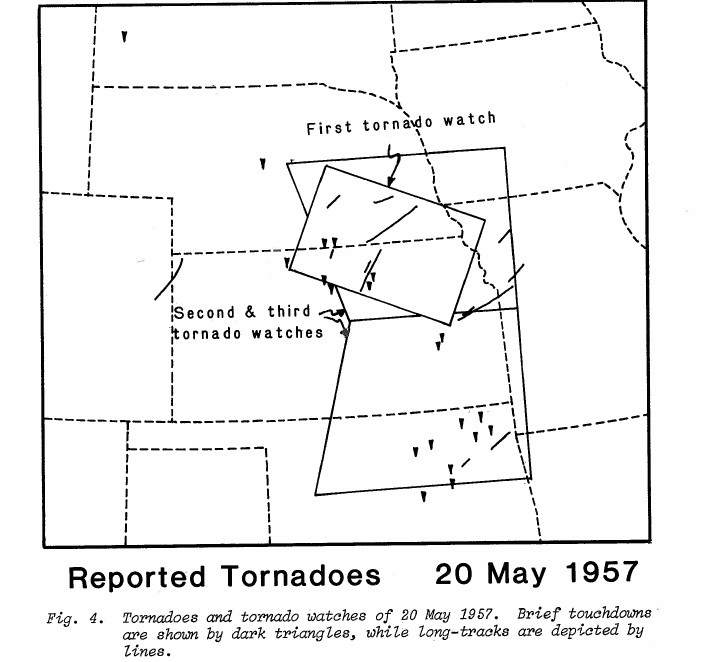
Tornado watches issued on May 20, 1957.

Early on May 20, a 75-to-80-knot (86 to 92 mph; 139 to 148 km/h) mid-level jet stream bisected dew points of 65 °F (18 °C), coincident with a 986-millibar (29.1 inHg) low-pressure area and warm front over southeastern Nebraska. Soundings and surface weather observations indicated a robust, unstable warm sector, showing 3,000 J/kg of surface-based convective available potential energy (CAPE) and the presence of strong wind shear, all which favored the development of supercells. At 17:00 UTC (12:00 p.m. CDT) the Severe Local Storms Unit (SELS) in Kansas City had already issued a severe weather watch, mentioning tornadoes, for the Kansas–Nebraska state line and its environs. Subsequent updates covered much of the eastern Great Plains, from the Green Country to southeastern Nebraska. Upon formation, severe thunderstorms traveled at up to 42 mph (68 km/h), attended by extremely large hail.

== Tornado summary ==
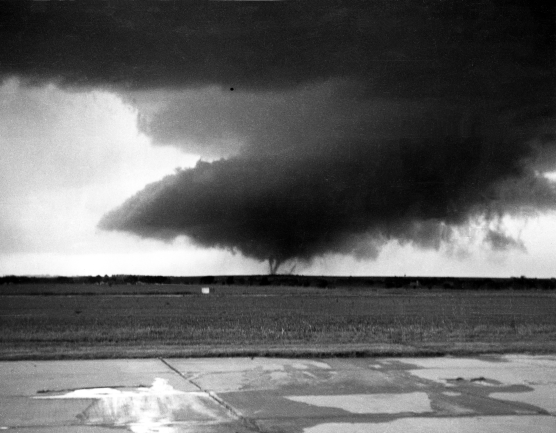
The tornado near Ottawa in Kansas

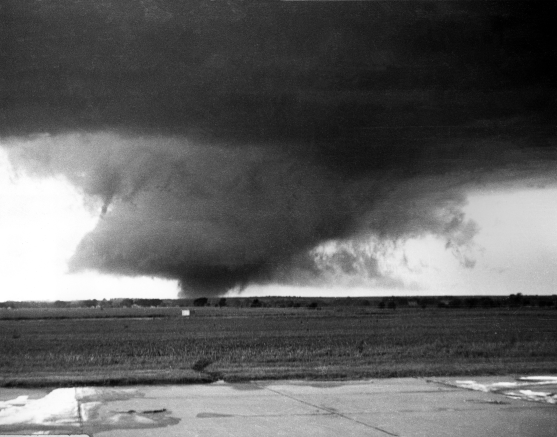
The tornado widening in size

The tornado, which was likely a family of tornadoes, was first seen as it was forming near Williamsburg, it then moved northeastward through several counties, producing near-continuous damage; a single tornado was likely present for 50 mi (80 km) or more. Around Homewood, the tornado was attended by up to 10 tentacle-like vortices or satellite tornadoes, producing major damage to rural property and carrying gravestones miles away. Near Homewood, it was determined from ground surveys that two tornadoes were on the ground at the time, with the second one being rated F3. Passing near Ottawa, Rantoul, and Spring Hill, it leveled many homes and caused seven fatalities. South of Wellsville, the tornado may have dissipated and reformed; it then continued uninterrupted for the rest of its life.

Along the Kansas–Missouri border the tornado followed a near-straight line, causing $1 million in losses in Kansas, along with seven deaths. Affecting the southern suburbs of Kansas City, it entered Missouri, tearing through Martin City, Hickman Mills, and Ruskin Heights, along with the northeastern side of Grandview. An occupied car was thrown into a water tower; the occupants survived. Ground scouring was observed near Hickman Mills, and large trees were snapped. Housing incurred F5 damage, besides some businesses at a shopping center. Some areas were reportedly "swept clean", and a newly built brick school in Ruskin Heights was badly damaged; 85% of Martin City was uninhabitable. In total, over 800 homes and businesses were damaged or destroyed. The tornado claimed 37 lives in Missouri and injured 500 or more people. Debris from Hickman Mills was found in Iowa, 165 mi (266 km) away, and other debris was carried aloft 30,000 ft (9,100 m; 5.7 mi; 9.1 km).

Historically, the 1957 F5 was not the only significant tornado to affect the area: an F3 tornado also affected Martin City and nearby Holmes Park on May 23, 1946, destroying or damaging chicken coops, silos, a marketplace, barns, and homes. The tornado killed a couple and injured five people.

== Aftermath ==
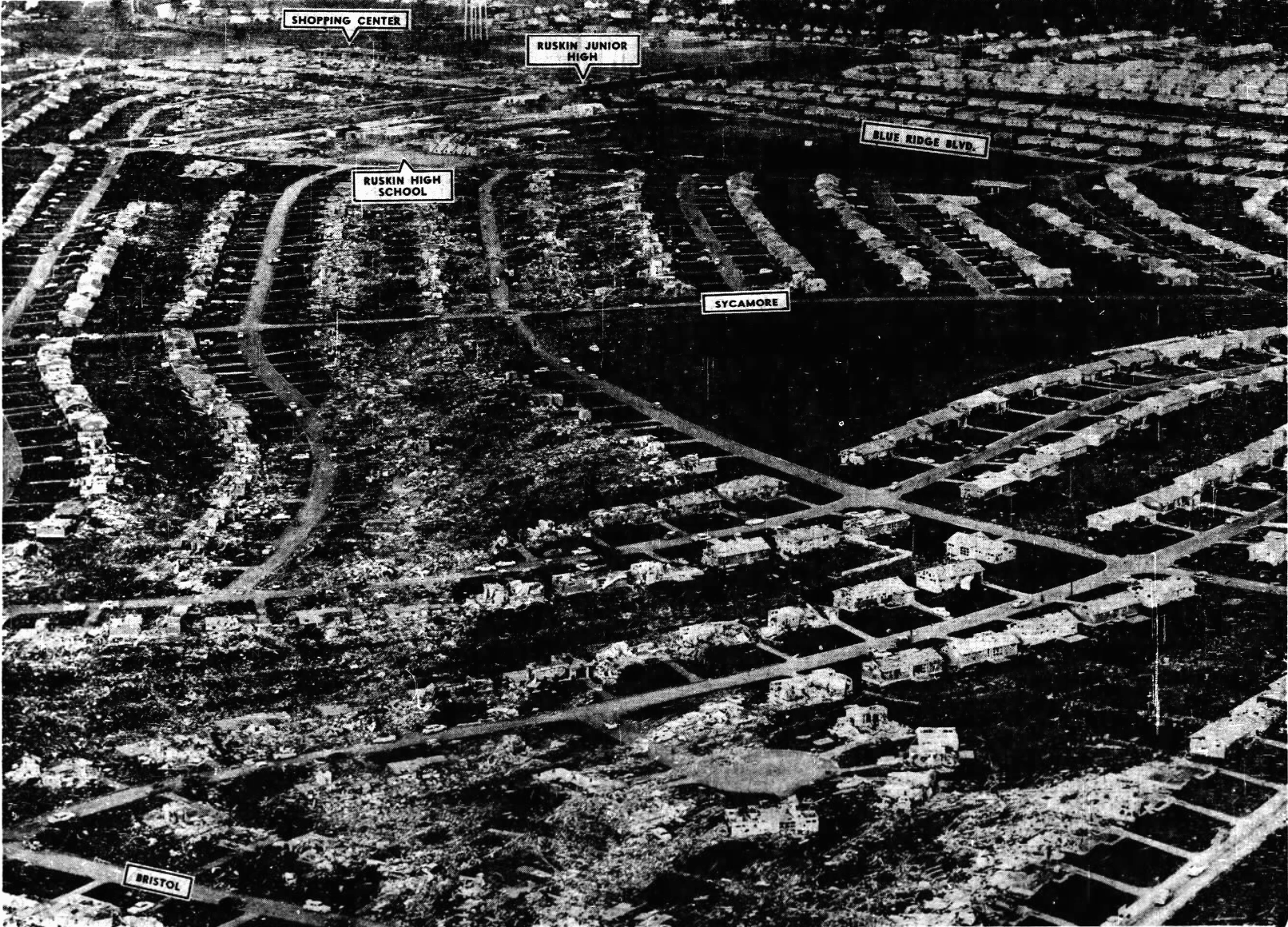
Aerial view of damage caused by the Ruskin Heights F5.

Martial law was declared in Ruskin Heights and neighboring areas. National Guard troops were called in to assist with rescue and cleanup operations. In total, the tornado caused $2,500,000 ($28,660,000 in 2025 USD) in damage in Kansas and Missouri. A memorial was constructed to honor the victims of the tornado; it was completed in May 1958. In September 2024, the memorial was damaged due to a car crash.

List of confirmed fatalities from the tornado
Name	Age	State	City
Gladys Erwin	54	Missouri	Hickman Mills
Linda Sue Stewart	0	Missouri	Hickman Mills
Goldie Marie Taylor	49	Missouri	Hickman Mills
Caroline Kay Taylor	3	Missouri	Hickman Mills
Cornelia Davis	25	Missouri	Hickman Mills
Katherine Sue Davis	7	Missouri	Hickman Mills
Marjorie Wackemagle Hower	31	Missouri	Hickman Mills
Oral Glenn Hower	35	Missouri	Hickman Mills
John Hower	9	Missouri	Hickman Mills
Lena Rucker	39	Missouri	Hickman Mills
Gerald Rucker	41	Missouri	Hickman Mills
Dorothy Lavonne Leopold	31	Missouri	Hickman Mills
Harold Keith Leopold	11	Missouri	Hickman Mills
Charles Johnston	36	Missouri	Ruskin Heights
Catherine Armon	31	Missouri	Ruskin Heights
Alta Guyll	41	Missouri	Ruskin Heights
George Kildow	45	Missouri	Ruskin Heights
Robert W. Yost, Jr	9	Missouri	Ruskin Heights
Diane Boyd-Rossi	7	Missouri	Ruskin Heights
Hester Timm	39	Missouri	Ruskin Heights
Denise Woodling	3	Missouri	Ruskin Heights
Maxine Nehring	30	Missouri	Ruskin Heights
Jeanette Nelson Dorris	79	Missouri	Ruskin Heights
Arthur Frechette	80	Missouri	Ruskin Heights
Charles Thompson	50	Missouri	Ruskin Heights
Amma Marsh	78	Kansas	Ottawa
James A. Marsh	84	Kansas	Ottawa
Isham Davis	34	Kansas	Spring Hill
Barbara Davis	31	Kansas	Spring Hill
Pamela Davis	7	Kansas	Spring Hill
Tamera Davis	5	Kansas	Spring Hill
Lowell Atkinson	43	Missouri	Martin City
Margaret Erlene Smith	24	Missouri	Martin City
Joseph Vinchier	78	Missouri	Grandview
Randall McGill	0	Missouri	Grandview
Edward S. Henton	50	Missouri	Grandview
Bessie Knorpp Smith	50	Missouri	Grandview
Maybelle Gabbert	73	Missouri	Knob Town
Henry Gabbert	71	Missouri	Knob Town
Unknown	Unknown	Unknown	Unknown (Note: Died due to tornado-caused injuries over the years.)
Unknown	Unknown	Unknown	Unknown
Unknown	Unknown	Unknown	Unknown
Unknown	Unknown	Unknown	Unknown
Unknown	Unknown	Unknown	Unknown

== See also ==
- Fargo tornado, another F5 tornado that touched down the same year
- 2011 Joplin tornado, a large and destructive EF5 tornado that struck Missouri over 50 years later

== Sources ==
- Brewer, Carolyn Glenn (1997). Caught in the Path: the Fury of a Tornado, the Rebirth of a Community. Overland Park, Kansas: Leathers Publishing. ISBN 0-9655774-0-6 – via Internet Archive.
- Grazulis, Thomas P. (May 1984). Violent Tornado Climatography, 1880–1982. OSTI (Technical report). NUREG. Washington, D.C.: Nuclear Regulatory Commission. OSTI 7099491. CR-3670.
- Grazulis, Thomas P. (July 1993). Significant Tornadoes 1680–1991: A Chronology and Analysis of Events. St. Johnsbury, Vermont: The Tornado Project of Environmental Films. ISBN 1-879362-03-1.
- Grazulis, Thomas P. (2001b). F5-F6 Tornadoes. St. Johnsbury, Vermont: The Tornado Project of Environmental Films.
- U.S. Weather Bureau (May 1957). "Storm data and unusual weather phenomena". Climatological Data National Summary. 8 (5). Asheville, North Carolina: National Climatic Data Center: 182–89.
