= List of tornadoes in the outbreak sequence of April 2–5, 1957 =

On April 2–5, 1957, a significant, deadly tornado outbreak sequence affected the Southern United States. This list details all confirmed tornadoes in this tornado outbreak sequence.

== Confirmed tornadoes ==
Confirmed tornadoes by Fujita rating
FU	F0	F1	F2	F3	F4	F5	Total
0	18	21	26	6	2	0	≥ 73

- In addition to confirmed tornadoes, a possible tornado may have destroyed a home in the Woodlawn community, near Sherman, on April 2. Another possible tornado hit Ballard County, Kentucky, on April 3, unroofing homes, destroying a drive-in theater, and uprooting trees. A loud roaring noise was heard. Another tornado may have also struck near Tansill in Pope County, Illinois, on the same date. Two other brief tornadoes may have hit near Westlake and at Tallulah, Louisiana, late on April 4.

=== April 2 event ===
Confirmed tornadoes – Tuesday, April 2, 1957 (Note: All dates are based on the local time zone where the tornado touched down; however, all times are in Coordinated Universal Time and dates are split at midnight CST/CDT for consistency.) (Note: Prior to 1994, only the average widths of tornado paths were officially listed.)
F#	Location	County / Parish	State	Start coord.	Time (UTC)	Path length	Max. width	Summary
F0	ESE of Allison	Cooke	TX	33.25°N 97.38°W	09:00–?	0.1 miles (0.16 km)	33 yards (30 m)	Tornado reported. Losses were unknown.
F2	SE of Howe	Grayson	TX	33.47°N 96.58°W	21:00–?	0.1 miles (0.16 km)	33 yards (30 m)	Tornado destroyed or damaged three homes, including a farmhouse, and blew cars off a road. Barns were also destroyed, and many trees were blown down. A couple were moved 50 yd (150 ft), critically injuring the woman. One other person was injured and losses totaled $25,000. Tornado may have been part of the same family as the Melissa–Anna–Van Alstyne F3.
F2	WSW of Rowland	Montague	TX	33.93°N 97.72°W	21:25–?	2 miles (3.2 km)	33 yards (30 m)	Short-lived tornado destroyed a church, a warehouse, and three houses. One woman was mildly injured when the roof over her head collapsed. Losses totaled $25,000.
F1	NNE of Ringling	Jefferson	OK	34.22°N 97.58°W	21:30–?	2 miles (3.2 km)	33 yards (30 m)	Short-lived tornado destroyed or damaged several farmsteads. Losses totaled $2,500.
F0	NNE of Grapevine	Tarrant	TX	32.97°N 97.05°W	21:50–?	0.3 miles (0.48 km)	67 yards (61 m)	Brief touchdown produced minimal damage. Losses totaled $2,500.
F0	SW of Pottsboro	Grayson	TX	33.72°N 96.7°W	22:00–?	0.1 miles (0.16 km)	33 yards (30 m)	Brief tornado destroyed or damaged three homes and numerous barns. Losses totaled $25,000. Grazulis listed the tornado as an F3 with a 5-mile-long (8.0 km) path length.
F3	Melissa to Anna to Van Alstyne	Collin, Grayson	TX	33.28°N 96.62°W	22:20–?	10.7 miles (17.2 km)	33 yards (30 m)	Intense tornado family comprised two distinct events, the first of which destroyed or damaged approximately 25 homes and barns, along with a church, a porch, and a warehouse, in and near Melissa, scattering debris for 3 mi (4.8 km). Second member of the family destroyed eight homes in Anna and left debris in Van Alstyne. Four people were injured and losses totaled $500,000. First member may have touched down at two locations east of McKinney.
F3	Western Dallas	Dallas	TX	32.85°N 96.83°W	22:30–23:10	17.2 miles (27.7 km)	100 yards (91 m)	10 deaths – See section on this tornado – At least 200 people were injured and losses totaled $2.5 million.
F2	SE of Davis to S of Stratford	Murray, Garvin	OK	34.55°N 96.9°W	22:50–?	11.7 miles (18.8 km)	400 yards (370 m)	Pair of tornadoes, paralleling each other within 2 mi (3.2 km), destroyed or damaged 28 barns and homes, carrying papers 40 mi (64 km) distant. A farmstead was nearly leveled at Corley, 3 mi (4.8 km) outside Stratford. One person—possibly two—was injured and losses totaled $50,000. Grazulis listed the tornado as a high-end F3, based on damage to three homes. NCEI lists the touchdown as west of Hickory.
F2	W of Dougherty	Murray	OK	34.4°N 97.13°W	22:55–?	2 miles (3.2 km)	600 yards (550 m)	1 death – Large, intense tornado crossing U.S. Route 77 in the Arbuckle Mountains south of Davis threw a pickup truck 75 yd (225 ft), killing the driver, and also tossed a car 300 yd (900 ft). A 340-to-360-foot-tall (100 to 110 m) telecommunications tower was destroyed, and a television transmission center lost its roof. Two people were injured and losses totaled $250,000. Grazulis listed the tornado as an F3.
F4	N of New Woodville	Marshall	OK	34°N 96.65°W	23:29–?	5.2 miles (8.4 km)	200 yards (180 m)	2 deaths – Violent tornado touched down over Lake Texoma, destroying or severely damaging 15 homes, a pair of oil refineries, and a fishing camp. A pair of large homes were swept away, and a car was tossed 200 ft (61 m) as well, resulting in a fatality and injury. Six people were injured and losses totaled $2.5 million.
F4	Calera to Durant to SW of Armstrong	Bryan	OK	33.93°N 96.43°W	23:58–?	7.9 miles (12.7 km)	200 yards (180 m)	3 deaths – Violent tornado destroyed a large barn and a drive-in theater in Calera (parodying a scene in the 1996 film Twister). Tornado also destroyed or damaged 160 businesses and homes in 29 blocks of Durant, along with a service station and nearly every building at Southeastern State College, now Southeastern Oklahoma State University. Three people were injured and losses totaled $500,000. Precursor to tornado was first observed as a funnel cloud near Denison, Texas.
F2	Ambia	Lamar	TX	33.48°N 95.77°W	00:00–?	6.5 miles (10.5 km)	100 yards (91 m)	1 death – Tornado destroyed a pair of homes, fatally crushing a man beneath debris. About seven other homes were destroyed nearby. Two people were injured and losses totaled $25,000. NCEI lists the path as extending from Ben Franklin to north of Roxton.
F2	Northern Wheeler	Wheeler	TX	35.45°N 100.27°W	00:05–?	0.3 miles (0.48 km)	33 yards (30 m)	Brief but strong tornado killed livestock, swept away a barn, damaged outbuildings, and severely damaged a farmhouse. Losses totaled $25,000.
F3	Dido to Newark	Tarrant, Wise	TX	33.03°N 97.55°W	00:15–00:40	≥0.1 miles (0.16 km)	33 yards (30 m)	Intense tornado destroyed or damaged numerous structures, including 11 homes, one of which was tossed 70 ft (21 m). A school lost its roof, school buses were tossed, a community centre made of sheet metal was flattened, and National Guard buildings were damaged. Two people were injured and losses totaled $250,000. Grazulis listed the tornado as a 9-mile-long (14 km) F2. NCEI lists the touchdown as north of Briar.
F2	E of Altus to W of Mountain View	Jackson, Kiowa	OK	34.63°N 99.27°W	00:30–?	43.7 miles (70.3 km)	150 yards (140 m)	Long-tracked tornado skipped past Friendship and Roosevelt, wrecking a truck and several barns. A home lost its roof as well. One person was injured and losses totaled $50,000.
F2	SE of Harmon	Lamar	TX	33.5°N 95.8°W	00:30–?	0.1 miles (0.16 km)	33 yards (30 m)	Brief but strong tornado struck the rural K-Bar Ranch, severely damaging an arena and outbuildings. Farm machinery, a garage, and a home received lesser damage, while another home was destroyed. Losses totaled $25,000.
F1	ENE of Stony to Plainview	Denton	TX	33.23°N 97.33°W	00:30–?	1.5 miles (2.4 km)	67 yards (61 m)	Tornado produced three distinct swaths of intermittent damage, including to outbuildings and a few barns. A home was partly unroofed as well. Losses totaled $25,000.
F0	W of Asher	Pottawatomie	OK	34.98°N 96.95°W	00:40–?	0.1 miles (0.16 km)	33 yards (30 m)	Brief touchdown reported. Losses totaled $30.
F0	S of Altus to ESE of Friendship	Jackson	OK	34.6°N 99.32°W	01:05–?	8.8 miles (14.2 km)	100 yards (91 m)	Second Altus-area tornado hit the eastern side of Altus Air Force Base and moved into rural areas. Losses totaled $25,000.
F1	SE of Grant to ESE of Spencerville	Choctaw	OK	33.93°N 95.5°W	01:15–?	16.8 miles (27.0 km)	33 yards (30 m)	Tornado passed east of Hugo, destroying or damaging several barns and homes. Losses totaled $25,000. Grazulis listed the tornado as an F2.
F2	Ben Franklin	Delta	TX	33.55°N 95.77°W	01:51–?	0.1 miles (0.16 km)	33 yards (30 m)	1 death – Tornado destroyed six homes and damaged several others. Two people were injured and losses totaled $25,000. This and the previous event may have belonged to the same family. Grazulis listed the tornado as the same as the Ambia–Harmon F2s, considering all three to be a 30-mile-long (48 km) F3 event.
F2	W of Bengal to McCurtain	Latimer, Haskell	OK	34.83°N 95.1°W	03:00–?	23.3 miles (37.5 km)	880 yards (800 m)	Tornado bypassed Salonia and Red Oak, destroying or damaging several stores, an old high school, and 28 homes. Two people were injured and losses totaled $50,000.
F2	Northwestern Hartshorne to N of Patterson	Pittsburg, Latimer	OK	34.85°N 95.57°W	03:05–?	11.7 miles (18.8 km)	440 yards (400 m)	Tornado struck Haileyville, destroying a barn and tearing the roofs off a drugstore and two other businesses. More than 100 television antennae were snapped, and many trees were felled as well. Losses totaled $25,000.
F1	ESE of Stephens Gap	McCurtain	OK	34.13°N 94.65°W	03:30–?	11.2 miles (18.0 km)	880 yards (800 m)	Nocturnal tornado east of Beavers Bend Resort Park destroyed 3,000,000 board feet (7,100 m^{3}) of timber near Carnasaw Tower in the Ouachita National Forest. Losses totaled $25,000.
F0	Western Poteau	Le Flore	OK	35.05°N 94.63°W	03:50–?	0.1 miles (0.16 km)	33 yards (30 m)	Little or no damage reported. Losses totaled $30.
F0	Northern Oklahoma City	Oklahoma	OK	35.6°N 97.55°W	04:30–?	0.1 miles (0.16 km)	33 yards (30 m)	30-foot-wide (9.1 m) swaths of grain standing in a field were flattened near The Village. Losses totaled $30.

=== April 3 event ===
Confirmed tornadoes – Wednesday, April 3, 1957
F#	Location	County / Parish	State	Start coord.	Time (UTC)	Path length	Max. width	Summary
F1	SW of Courtney	Love	OK	33.93°N 97.52°W	05:45–?	0.1 miles (0.16 km)	33 yards (30 m)	Tornado swept away a home. Losses were unknown. Many tornadoes were reported nearby.
F0	Northern Davenport	Lincoln	OK	35.72°N 96.77°W	06:15–?	0.1 miles (0.16 km)	33 yards (30 m)	Funnel was observed aloft and later confirmed to have been a tornado. Losses totaled $30.
F0	Northern Terrell	Kaufman	TX	32.75°N 96.28°W	07:15–?	0.1 miles (0.16 km)	33 yards (30 m)	Brief touchdown reported. Losses were unknown.
F1	SSW of Woodlawn (1st tornado)	Harrison	TX	32.62°N 94.38°W	16:28–?	0.1 miles (0.16 km)	33 yards (30 m)	Brief touchdown. Losses totaled $30.
F0	W of Parvin	Denton	TX	33.25°N 96.95°W	16:30–?	0.1 miles (0.16 km)	33 yards (30 m)	Tornado hit an open field, causing only $30 in losses.
F0	Southern Fort Worth	Tarrant	TX	32.67°N 97.33°W	16:45–?	0.1 miles (0.16 km)	33 yards (30 m)	Losses totaled $30.
F0	Western Duncanville	Dallas	TX	32.65°N 96.92°W	16:50–?	0.1 miles (0.16 km)	33 yards (30 m)	Tornado damaged a single home. Losses totaled $250.
F2	W of Lone Star	Morris	TX	32.88°N 94.72°W	17:00–?	0.1 miles (0.16 km)	33 yards (30 m)	Tornado destroyed a structure and damaged six outbuildings on a farm. Losses totaled $250. Grazulis did not list the tornado as an F2 or stronger.
F2	SSW of Woodlawn (2nd tornado)	Harrison	TX	32.62°N 94.38°W	17:30–?	0.1 miles (0.16 km)	33 yards (30 m)	Tornado partly unroofed a home, damaged a pair of outbuildings, destroyed a shed, and downed trees. Losses totaled $2,500. Grazulis did not list the tornado as an F2 or stronger.
F1	ESE of Caruth	Dunklin	MO	36.13°N 90.08°W	18:00–18:10	1 mile (1.6 km)	100 yards (91 m)	Tornado damaged several structures and a cotton gin. Losses totaled $2,500.
F2	Alexander	Greene	AR	36.07°N 90.42°W	18:05–?	0.1 miles (0.16 km)	33 yards (30 m)	Brief tornado destroyed a garage. Losses totaled $250. Grazulis did not list the tornado as an F2 or stronger. NCEI lists the touchdown as east-northeast of Morning Star.
F3	ENE of Cash to N of Finch	Craighead, Greene	AR	35.8°N 90.92°W	18:05–?	22.6 miles (36.4 km)	100 yards (91 m)	Intense tornado badly damaged a rice dryer and wrecked many structures. Losses totaled $25,000. Grazulis did not list the tornado as an F2 or stronger.
F1	Manila	Mississippi	AR	35.8°N 90.17°W	18:30–?	0.1 miles (0.16 km)	33 yards (30 m)	Brief tornado damaged a pair of homes. Losses totaled $250. NCEI lists the touchdown as north-northeast of Floodway.
F1	Little Cypress	Orange	TX	30.1°N 93.73°W	18:45–?	0.1 miles (0.16 km)	33 yards (30 m)	Tornado ripped a 50-by-40-foot (15 by 12 m) portion of a roof off a school. Losses totaled $250. NCEI lists the touchdown as near downtown Orange.
F0	E of Dogwood	Mississippi	MO	36.83°N 89.4°W	19:30–19:35	0.3 miles (0.48 km)	10 yards (9.1 m)	Tornado damaged outbuildings on a farm. Losses totaled $2,500.
F2	Hurstown	Shelby	TX	31.62°N 94.05°W	19:30–?	2 miles (3.2 km)	33 yards (30 m)	Brief but strong tornado destroyed a pair of barns and a small home. Losses totaled $2,500. NCEI lists the touchdown as northwest of Hawthorne.
F2	Cairo to Mound City	Alexander, Pulaski	IL	37°N 89.2°W	20:00–?	6.8 miles (10.9 km)	33 yards (30 m)	Tornado affected a two-block-wide swath, unroofing three large buildings. Five people were injured and losses totaled $250,000. Grazulis did not list the tornado as an F2 or stronger.
F1	W of Drake	Warren	KY	36.83°N 86.45°W	23:30–?	0.1 miles (0.16 km)	33 yards (30 m)	Funnel cloud was observed and later confirmed to have been a brief tornado. Losses were unknown.
F0	Hodge	Jackson	LA	32.25°N 92.7°W	00:00–?	0.5 miles (0.80 km)	33 yards (30 m)	Brief tornado caused minor damage. Losses totaled $250.
F1	Glen Allan to Darlove	Washington	MS	33.03°N 91.03°W	01:15–?	11.9 miles (19.2 km)	33 yards (30 m)	Tornado destroyed or damaged a cotton gin, a church, and 20 homes. Four people were injured and losses totaled $250,000. Grazulis listed the tornado as an F2.

=== April 4 event ===
Confirmed tornadoes – Thursday, April 4, 1957
F#	Location	County / Parish	State	Start coord.	Time (UTC)	Path length	Max. width	Summary
F2	NNE of Vernon to WNW of Forreston	Winston, Noxubee, Lowndes	MS	33°N 88.92°W	06:15–?	40.7 miles (65.5 km)	200 yards (180 m)	Tornado destroyed rural farms and outbuildings. Four people were injured and losses totaled $25,000.
F3	SSE of Sanatorium to E of Montrose	Simpson, Smith, Jasper	MS	31.88°N 89.77°W	07:00–?	40.2 miles (64.7 km)	167 yards (153 m)	1 death – Intense tornado first struck a tuberculosis sanatorium—now Boswell Regional Center—injuring 30 of its 200 patients. 10 homes were destroyed or damaged nearby. The sole fatality occurred in a school bus, along with 15 injuries. In all, 75 people were injured and losses totaled $250,000.
F2	SE of Middle Fork	Henderson	TN	35.53°N 88.48°W	07:10–?	0.1 miles (0.16 km)	7 yards (6.4 m)	Narrow and brief but strong tornado destroyed or damaged many barns and six homes. Losses totaled $25,000.
F3	SE of Ramer to NNE of Gravel Hill	McNairy	TN	35.05°N 88.6°W	07:15–08:00	7.3 miles (11.7 km)	50 yards (46 m)	Tornado struck Eastview, destroying or damaging nine barns and 22 homes, along with a grocery store, a filling station, and a cotton gin. Five outbuildings were impacted as well. 11 people were injured and losses totaled $250,000. Grazulis listed the tornado as an F2.
F1	WSW of Hamilton	Lonoke	AR	34.7°N 91.87°W	23:30–?	0.3 miles (0.48 km)	20 yards (18 m)	Short-lived tornado damaged approximately 20 acres (8.1 ha). A silo, light poles, and fencing were destroyed or felled. Losses totaled $2,500.

=== April 5 event ===
Confirmed tornadoes – Friday, April 5, 1957
F#	Location	County / Parish	State	Start coord.	Time (UTC)	Path length	Max. width	Summary
F0	Eastern Aldora	Lamar	GA	33.05°N 84.17°W	08:00–?	1.3 miles (2.1 km)	33 yards (30 m)	Tornado destroyed or damaged porches, barns, roofs, trees, and utility wires near Barnesville. Losses totaled $25,000.
F2	SW of Ellaville to SSE of Massey Hill	Schley, Macon, Peach, Houston, Twiggs, Wilkinson	GA	32.2°N 84.35°W	09:00–10:30	75 miles (121 km)	400 yards (370 m)	2 deaths – Long-lived tornado family destroyed or damaged more than 123 homes, along with a drive-in theater, plate glass, and roofing. Many trees were downed as well. Five—possibly 10—people were injured and losses totaled $750,000.
F2	SW of Warrenton to Leah	Warren, McDuffie, Columbia	GA	33.47°N 82.5°W	12:00–?	23.3 miles (37.5 km)	400 yards (370 m)	Intermittent tornado destroyed or damaged more than seven homes, many barns, and a church. Utility wires and trees were downed as well. Losses totaled $50,000. The path may have been 30 mi (48 km) in length.
F2	SSE of Ansley Mill to ENE of Grovetown	McDuffie, Columbia	GA	33.47°N 82.40°W	12:15–?	14.4 miles (23.2 km)	400 yards (370 m)	Tornado destroyed a home between Harlem and Appling. Two people were injured and losses totaled $25,000. Grazulis listed a 3-mile-long (4.8 km) path.
F2	NW of Chinquapin Falls to NNW of Lexington	Lexington	SC	33.83°N 81.53°W	12:45–13:30	21.3 miles (34.3 km)	40 yards (37 m)	Tornado destroyed a home, damaged several others, and badly damaged a recreational hall. One person was injured and losses totaled $25,000. Grazulis did not list the tornado as an F2 or stronger.
F1	Southern Prosperity to WSW of Kibler	Newberry	SC	34.2°N 81.53°W	13:14–?	3.3 miles (5.3 km)	100 yards (91 m)	Losses totaled $2,500.
F0	SW of Pineboro to SW of Wagon Wheel	Colquitt, Cook	GA	31.17°N 83.68°W	13:30–?	13.7 miles (22.0 km)	67 yards (61 m)	Tornado destroyed more than three barns and several homes. Trees were uprooted as well. Losses totaled $2,500.
F1	Jamestown	Ware	GA	31.3°N 82.38°W	16:00–?	0.1 miles (0.16 km)	17 yards (16 m)	Tornado destroyed one home and damaged other structures. Trees sustained minor damage as well. One person was injured and losses totaled $2,500.
F0	NNW of Savannah	Chatham	GA	32.1°N 81.1°W	16:34–?	0.3 miles (0.48 km)	10 yards (9.1 m)	Tornado on Hutchinson Island damaged small structures and roofing. Many trees were uprooted as well. Losses totaled $30.
F1	E of Winchester	Randolph	IN	40.17°N 84.88°W	18:00–?	0.1 miles (0.16 km)	33 yards (30 m)	Tornado struck a hangar at the Randolph County Airport, then Winchester Airport, tearing loose a door. Losses totaled $2,500.
F2	Southern Muncie	Delaware	IN	40.18°N 85.38°W	18:05–?	0.1 miles (0.16 km)	33 yards (30 m)	Tornado flipped a trailer home, downed power lines, damaged the front of a home, and tossed metal garage roofing 50 ft (15 m). Losses totaled $25,000. Grazulis did not list the tornado as an F2 or stronger.
F0	ENE of Fairmount	Grant	IN	40.42°N 85.63°W	18:30–?	0.1 miles (0.16 km)	33 yards (30 m)	Tornado downed utility wires and wrecked a shed. Losses totaled $250.
F2	NE of Bartlettsville	Lawrence	IN	38.98°N 86.43°W	18:30–?	0.1 miles (0.16 km)	33 yards (30 m)	Tornado unroofed a few barns and a home. Losses totaled $2,500.
F1	ESE of Big Stone Gap	Wise	VA	36.88°N 82.75°W	18:40–?	0.1 miles (0.16 km)	33 yards (30 m)	Tornado downed walls, blew off roofs, snapped utility poles, and shattered windows. Three people were injured and losses totaled $25,000.
F1	Needmore	Lawrence	IN	39.93°N 86.53°W	18:45–?	0.1 miles (0.16 km)	33 yards (30 m)	Tornado damaged a few structures. Losses totaled $2,500.
F2	NE of Redkey to Poling	Jay	IN	40.37°N 85.13°W	19:15–?	≥0.1 miles (0.16 km)	33 yards (30 m)	Tornado damaged light poles, destroyed a shed, and unroofed a home. Losses totaled $2,500. Grazulis did not list the tornado as an F2 or stronger.
F2	ESE of Middletown	Henry	IN	40.05°N 85.52°W	20:00–?	0.1 miles (0.16 km)	33 yards (30 m)	Tornado downed trees, television antennae, and power lines. A gymnasium lost a third of its roof, and smaller buildings were unroofed as well. One person was injured and losses totaled $25,000. Grazulis did not list the tornado as an F2 or stronger.
F1	W of Glen Cove to ENE of Texas	Pasquotank, Camden	NC	36.17°N 76.1°W	21:30–?	6.1 miles (9.8 km)	37 yards (34 m)	Tornado crossed the Pasquotank River, wrecking outbuildings and unroofing a farmhouse. Losses totaled $25,000.
F1	ENE of Longtown to NNW of Yadkinville	Yadkin	NC	36.15°N 80.75°W	23:10–?	4.7 miles (7.6 km)	50 yards (46 m)	Tornado downed outbuildings, trees, and utility lines. Losses totaled $25,000.
F1	NE of Crocketts Crossroad	Lancaster	SC	34.7°N 80.78°W	01:30–?	1 mile (1.6 km)	33 yards (30 m)	Tornado extensively damaged several homes and a school north-northeast of Springdale. Losses totaled $250,000.
F1	SE of Georgetown to Northern High Point	Davidson, Guilford	NC	36°N 80.08°W	01:35–?	4.7 miles (7.6 km)	50 yards (46 m)	Tornado skipped along, destroying or damaging an automobile, plate glass, outbuildings, roofing, trees, chimneys, antennae, and 12 rural homes. One person was injured and losses totaled $250,000.

== Sources ==
- Beebe, Robert G. (1960). "The Life Cycle of the Dallas Tornado". In Hoecker, Walter H. (ed.). The tornadoes at Dallas, Tex., April 2, 1957 (Report). U.S. Weather Bureau Research Paper No. 41. Washington: U.S. Department of Commerce, Weather Bureau. pp. 3–52 – via HathiTrust.
- Brooks, Harold E. (April 2004). "On the Relationship of Tornado Path Length and Width to Intensity". Weather and Forecasting. 19 (2): 310–19. Bibcode:2004WtFor..19..310B. doi:10.1175/1520-0434(2004)019<0310:OTROTP>2.0.CO;2.
- Cook, A. R.; Schaefer, J. T. (August 2008). "The Relation of El Niño–Southern Oscillation (ENSO) to Winter Tornado Outbreaks". Monthly Weather Review. 136 (8): 3135. Bibcode:2008MWRv..136.3121C. doi:10.1175/2007MWR2171.1.
- Fujita, T. Theodore (February 1971). Proposed Characterization of Tornadoes and Hurricanes by Area and Intensity. Texas Tech University Southwest Collection/Special Collections Library (Report). Satellite and Mesometeorology Research Project Research Paper No. 91. hdl:10605/261875.
- Grazulis, Thomas P. (November 1990). Significant Tornadoes 1880–1989. Vol. 2. St. Johnsbury, Vermont: The Tornado Project of Environmental Films. ISBN 1-879362-02-3.
- Grazulis, Thomas P. (July 1993). Significant Tornadoes 1680–1991: A Chronology and Analysis of Events. St. Johnsbury, Vermont: The Tornado Project of Environmental Films. ISBN 1-879362-03-1.
- Grazulis, Thomas P. (2001a). The Tornado: Nature's Ultimate Windstorm. Norman: University of Oklahoma Press. ISBN 978-0-8061-3538-0.
- Grazulis, Thomas P. (2001b). F5-F6 Tornadoes. St. Johnsbury, Vermont: The Tornado Project of Environmental Films.
- Hoecker, Walter H. (1960) [1959]. "The Dimensional and Rotational Characteristics of the Tornadoes and Their Cloud System". Written at Washington, D.C. In Hoecker, Walter H. (ed.). The tornadoes at Dallas, Tex., April 2, 1957 (Report). U.S. Weather Bureau Research Paper No. 41. Los Angeles: UCLA. pp. 53–113 – via HathiTrust.
- Hoecker, Walter H. (May 1960b). "Wind Speed and Air Flow Patterns in the Dallas Tornado of April 2, 1957". Monthly Weather Review. 88 (5): 167–80. Bibcode:1960MWRv...88..167H. doi:10.1175/1520-0493(1960)088<0167:WSAAFP>2.0.CO;2.
- Lee, Jean T. (1960) [1958]. "The Synoptic Situation". In Hoecker, Walter H. (ed.). The tornadoes at Dallas, Tex., April 2, 1957 (Report). U.S. Weather Bureau Research Paper No. 41. Washington: U.S. Department of Commerce, Weather Bureau. pp. 114–42 – via HathiTrust.
- Williams, Dansy T. (1960) [1958]. "The Role of a Subsidence Layer". In Hoecker, Walter H. (ed.). The tornadoes at Dallas, Tex., April 2, 1957 (Report). U.S. Weather Bureau Research Paper No. 41. Washington: U.S. Department of Commerce, Weather Bureau. pp. 143–58 – via HathiTrust.
- National Weather Service (April 1957). Storm Data Publication (Report). National Centers for Environmental Information – via Storm Events Database.
- U.S. Weather Bureau (April 1957). "Storm data and unusual weather phenomena". Climatological Data National Summary. 8 (4). Asheville, North Carolina: National Climatic Data Center: 106–115.
