= Tornado outbreak of November 7–8, 1957 =

Severe weather event in the United States

Tornado outbreak
- Tornadoes: 28
- Max. rating: F4 tornado
- Duration: November 7–8, 1957
- Highest gusts: 66 kn (76 mph; 122 km/h) on November 7

Overall effects
- Fatalities: 12
- Injuries: 213
- Damage: $7.719 million ($88,480,000 in 2025 USD) (Note: All losses are in 1957 USD unless otherwise noted.)
- Areas affected: Southern United States (primarily Louisiana, Texas, and Mississippi)
- Part of the tornadoes and tornado outbreaks of 1957

On November 7–8, 1957, a significant tornado outbreak affected portions of the Southern United States, particularly the Golden Triangle of Southeast Texas and parts of Acadiana in Louisiana. (Note: An outbreak is generally defined as a group of at least six tornadoes (the number sometimes varies slightly according to local climatology) with no more than a six-hour gap between individual tornadoes. An outbreak sequence, prior to (after) the start of modern records in 1950, is defined as a period of no more than two (one) consecutive days without at least one significant (F2 or stronger) tornado.) The severe weather event inflicted 12 deaths and more than 200 injuries, especially in the vicinity of Beaumont and Port Arthur, Texas. The most intense tornado of the outbreak, retrospectively rated F4 on the Fujita scale, struck the town of Orange, Texas, killing one person, injuring 81 others, and causing $1 1/2 million in losses. The deadliest tornado of the outbreak was an F3 that killed four people northwest of Carencro, Louisiana. The costliest tornado of the outbreak, also rated F3, caused $2.3 million in losses in the town of Groves, Texas, killing a few people there. Other intense tornadoes occurred as far east as Mississippi and North Carolina. In all, at least 28 tornadoes were confirmed, yet others were likely present as well.

== Background ==
On November 7, 1957, a potent trough passed over the Central United States. Meanwhile, a vigorous subtropical jet stream—possibly related to ongoing El Niño conditions—bearing winds of up to 120 knots (140 mph; 220 km/h) impinged on South Texas. By the evening, high levels of wind shear and atmospheric instability over Southeast Texas and adjourning portions of Louisiana were conducive to the formation of tornado-generating supercells; among these variables were CAPE values of up to 2,500 j/kg, high dew points that reached the lower 70s °F, precipitable water values of up to 1 3/4 in (44 mm), and deep-layer wind shear of up to 70 kn (81 mph; 130 km/h).

== Outbreak statistics ==
Daily statistics of tornadoes during the tornado outbreak of November 7–8, 1957
Date (Note: All dates are based on the local time zone where the tornado touched down; however, all times are in Coordinated Universal Time and dates are split at midnight CST/CDT for consistency.)	Total	F-scale rating (Note: The Fujita scale was devised under the aegis of scientist T. Theodore Fujita in the early 1970s. Prior to the advent of the scale in 1971, tornadoes in the United States were officially unrated. Tornado ratings were retroactively applied to events prior to the formal adoption of the F-scale by the National Weather Service. While the Fujita scale has been superseded by the Enhanced Fujita scale in the U.S. since February 1, 2007, Canada used the old scale until April 1, 2013; nations elsewhere, like the United Kingdom, apply other classifications such as the TORRO scale.)							Deaths	Injuries	Damage (Note: The National Oceanic and Atmospheric Administration's Storm Data publication does not list exact damage totals for every event, instead giving damage categories. As such, damage for individual tornadoes is not comprehensive.)	Ref.
Date	Total	FU	F0	F1	F2	F3	F4	F5	Deaths	Injuries	Damage	Ref.
November 7	19	0	0	8	6	4	1	0	12	199	$5,891,500	
November 8	9	3	0	2	3	1	0	0	0	14	$1,827,500	
Total	28	3	0	10	9	5	1	0	12	213	$7,719,000	

Outbreak death toll
State	Total	County	County total
Louisiana	7	Acadia	2
Louisiana	7	Rapides	3
Louisiana	7	St. Landry	2
Mississippi	2	Holmes	2
Texas	3	Jefferson	2
Texas	3	Orange	1
Totals	12		
All deaths were tornado-related

== Confirmed tornadoes ==
Confirmed tornadoes by Fujita rating
FU	F0	F1	F2	F3	F4	F5	Total
3	0	10	9	5	1	0	≥ 28*
"FU" denotes unclassified but confirmed tornadoes.

Prior to 1990, there is a likely undercount of tornadoes, particularly E/F0–1, with reports of weaker tornadoes becoming more common as population increased. A sharp increase in the annual average E/F0–1 count by approximately 200 tornadoes was noted upon the implementation of NEXRAD Doppler weather radar in 1990–1991. (Note: Historically, the number of tornadoes globally and in the United States was and is likely underrepresented: research by Grazulis on annual tornado activity suggests that, as of 2001, only 53% of yearly U.S. tornadoes were officially recorded. Documentation of tornadoes outside the United States was historically less exhaustive, owing to the lack of monitors in many nations and, in some cases, to internal political controls on public information. Most countries only recorded tornadoes that produced severe damage or loss of life. Significant low biases in U.S. tornado counts likely occurred through the early 1990s, when advanced NEXRAD was first installed and the National Weather Service began comprehensively verifying tornado occurrences.) 1974 marked the first year where significant tornado (E/F2+) counts became homogenous with contemporary values, attributed to the consistent implementation of Fujita scale assessments. Numerous discrepancies on the details of tornadoes in this outbreak exist between sources. The total count of tornadoes and ratings differs from various agencies accordingly. The list below documents information from the most contemporary official sources alongside assessments from tornado historian Thomas P. Grazulis.

Color/symbol key
Color / symbol	Description
†	Data from Grazulis 1990/1993/2001b
¶	Data from a local National Weather Service office
※	Data from the 1957 Climatological Data National Summary publication
‡	Data from the NCEI database
♯	Maximum width of tornado
±	Tornado was rated below F2 intensity by Grazulis but a specific rating is unavailable.

List of confirmed tornadoes in the tornado outbreak of November 7–8, 1957
F#	Location	County / Parish	State	Start Coord. (Note: All starting coordinates are based on the NCEI database and may not reflect contemporary analyses)	Date	Time (UTC)	Path length	Width (Note: The listed width values are primarily the average/mean width of the tornadoes, with those having known maximum widths denoted by ♯. From 1952 to 1994, reports largely list mean width whereas contemporary years list maximum width. Values provided by Grazulis are the average width, with estimates being rounded down (i.e. 0.5 mi (0.80 km) is rounded down from 880 yards to 800 yards.)	Damage
F1¶	Grand Prairie	St. Landry	Louisiana	Unknown	November 7	20:20–?	2 mi (3.2 km)	50 yd (46 m)	$25,000
F1¶	This tornado was not listed in the NCEI database or by Grazulis, but was revealed in a reanalysis by the National Weather Service.								
F2	Robson to Fillmore※	Caddo, Bossier※	Louisiana	32.40°N 93.70°W	November 7	20:30–?	15 mi (24 km)※	100 yd (91 m)※	$25,000‡
F2	This tornado unroofed or destroyed a few homes as it traversed rural, mostly forested land. Many trees and transmission wires were downed as well. The NCEI database lists the path as traveling from Lucas to Curtis and thence to just west of Haughton.								
F1¶	Lowry	Cameron	Louisiana	Unknown	November 7	20:30–?‡	1 mi (1.6 km)	50 yd (46 m)※	$2,500
F1¶	This and the following two events are listed as a single tornado in the NCEI database, but were split into three distinct tracks in a reanalysis by the National Weather Service.								
F1¶	Andrus Cove	Jefferson Davis	Louisiana	30.05°N 92.75°W‡	November 7	21:00–?¶	1 mi (1.6 km)	50 yd (46 m)※	$25,000
F1¶	This, the preceding, and the following event are listed as a single tornado in the NCEI database, but were split into three distinct tracks in a reanalysis by the National Weather Service. The NCEI database lists the path as traveling from just east-northeast of Illinois Plant to south-southwest of Iota.								
F1¶	Gotts Cove	Acadia	Louisiana	Unknown	November 7	21:30–?¶	5 mi (8.0 km)	50 yd (46 m)※	$25,000
F1¶	This and the preceding two events are listed as a single tornado in the NCEI database, but were split into three distinct tracks in a reanalysis by the National Weather Service. Between Lowry and Iota the three events altogether damaged just a few homes.								
F2†	Near Lettsworth to near Torras†	Pointe Coupee	Louisiana	30.97°N 91.70°W	November 7	22:50–?	3 mi (4.8 km)※	50 yd (46 m)※	$250,000‡
F2†	This intense tornado destroyed three barns and seven homes. 12 other structures were damaged as well. Five people were injured.								
F1¶	Iota	Acadia	Louisiana	Unknown	November 7	23:30–?	5 mi (8.0 km)	50 yd (46 m)	$25,000
F1¶	One person was injured.								
F2†	W of Leesville※	Vernon	Louisiana	31.17°N 93.30°W	November 7	02:35–?	1 mi (1.6 km)‡	50 yd (46 m)‡	$25,000‡
F2†	This tornado only destroyed one home and damaged four other structures. The NCEI database lists the touchdown as southwest of Hawthorne.								
F2†	WSW of Nome to WSW of China¶	Jefferson	Texas	30.05°N 94.33°W	November 7	02:45–?	5 mi (8.0 km)†	50 yd (46 m)†	$14,000¶
F2†	This tornado damaged or destroyed three homes, one of which was a two-story structure. A Sun Oil Company utility shed was also damaged.								
F2¶	Northwestern Boyce	Rapides	Louisiana	31.38°N 92.67°W‡	November 7	02:55–?	1 mi (1.6 km)	50 yd (46 m)	$25,000
F2¶	1 death – This strong tornado destroyed or damaged more than 11 homes, one of which shifted on its foundation. 14 people were injured. This and the following tornado are listed as one event in the NCEI database, but were split into separate events in a reanalysis by the NWS.								
F3	Downtown Alexandria to Wardville¶	Rapides	Louisiana	Unknown	November 7	03:04–?¶	3 mi (4.8 km)¶	75 yd (69 m)¶	$500,000¶
F3	2 deaths – This intense tornado destroyed or damaged 235–315 homes in Alexandria. The tornado subsequently traversed the Red River and hit Wardville before dissipating, causing two injuries and destroying or damaging nine homes there. Only individuals—28 in all—whose injuries required medical attention were recorded; others may have received minor injuries. This and the preceding tornado are listed as one event in the NCEI database, but were split into separate events in a reanalysis by the NWS.								
F2†	Southeastern Port Acres※	Jefferson	Texas	29.90°N 94.00°W	November 7	03:10–?¶	1.5 mi (2.4 km)	70 yd (64 m)※	$75,000†
F2†	This strong tornado damaged 15 homes and destroyed five others. Only one injury was reported.								
F3	Downtown Groves※	Jefferson	Texas	29.95°N 93.93°W	November 7	03:15–?	3 mi (4.8 km)※	150 yd (140 m)†	$2,300,000†
F3	2 deaths – Approximately 1,160 structures were destroyed or damaged, including many businesses and homes. The deaths occurred each in small homes that were flattened. 53 people were injured as well. This tornado was the costliest of the outbreak. The NCEI database lists the endpoint as south of Atreco.								
F4	Northern Orange¶	Orange	Texas	30.10°N 93.73°W	November 7	03:27–?¶	6 mi (9.7 km)†	200 yd (180 m)†	$1,500,000†
F4	1 death – This was probably the most intense tornado of the outbreak, but only leveled frail structures beside the Sabine River in its path, so it may have merited high-end F3 status at most. About 430 homes were destroyed or damaged in Orange, including a two-story home that was flattened, killing a woman inside. A total of 12 barges and ships were torn from their moorings, some of which were moved onto the Louisiana shore. The tornado may have ended as a downburst in neighboring Louisiana. 81 people were injured, though other estimates ranged from 20 to 50. The NCEI database incorrectly labels this tornado as having moved southwestward.								
F1¶	Mossville	Calcasieu	Louisiana	Unknown	November 7	04:20–?	1 mi (1.6 km)	25 yd (23 m)	$25,000
F1¶	This tornado was not listed in the NCEI database or by Grazulis, but was revealed in a reanalysis by the National Weather Service.								
F3	S of Cruger to E of Greenwood※	Holmes, Leflore†, Carroll	Mississippi	33.28°N 90.23°W	November 7	05:00–?	20 mi (32 km)※	300 yd (270 m)※	$275,000‡
F3	2 deaths – This intense, long-tracked tornado destroyed 23 structures near Cruger, including a tenant home. A car was transported for 1/4 mi (0.40 km) as well. One person was injured. The NCEI database indicates that the path extended from near Keirn to near Malmaison.								
F1	Alcorn to ESE of Westside	Claiborne	Mississippi	31.87°N 91.15°W	November 7	05:05–?	4.1 mi (6.6 km)‡	100 yd (91 m)‡	$250,000‡
F1	This tornado struck Alcorn State University, known then as Alcorn Agricultural and Mechanical (A & M) College.								
F1	Eastern Louisville	Winston	Mississippi	33.12°N 89.03°W	November 7	05:30–?	0.1 mi (0.16 km)‡	33 yd (30 m)‡	$25,000‡
F1	Nine structures were destroyed or damaged.								
F3	WSW of Higginbotham to between Cankton and Bristol¶	Acadia, St. Landry	Louisiana	30.35°N 92.20°W	November 7	05:30–?	8 mi (13 km)¶	200 yd (180 m)	$500,000‡
F3	4 deaths – This intense tornado destroyed or damaged 85 homes and outbuildings. Two of the dead, a couple, were cast 150 yd (140 m). 15 people were injured, though some sources list 10 to 12 injuries. An F1 tornado is incorrectly listed in the NCEI database as having killed a few people and injured 13 others near the northern edge of Carencro, but in a reanalysis by the NWS is assessed as having been the same event as this tornado. Grazulis listed a 15-mile-long (24 km) path that began southeast of Branch and ended near Sunset.								
F2†	SE of Philadelphia to Gholson†	Neshoba, Kemper, Noxubee	Mississippi	32.75°N 89.12°W	November 8	07:30–08:25※	25 mi (40 km)†	200 yd (180 m)	$750,000‡
F2†	A total of 52 structures were destroyed or damaged, including 15 barns and six homes. In all, three people were injured.								
F2±	Eastern Pulaski to S of Berea	Giles	Tennessee	35.20°N 87.02°W	November 8	08:00–?	4 mi (6.4 km)※	100 yd (91 m)※	$2,500‡
F2±	A strong tornado touched down in the Rebel Acres neighborhood, damaging television antennae and roofing. At Powell Chapel the tornado tore off a roof, porch, and wall. A garage and a barn were wrecked as well.								
F2†	NW of Aliceville※	Pickens	Alabama	33.13°N 88.13°W	November 8	08:25–?	8 mi (13 km)※	10 yd (9.1 m)‡	$250,000‡
F2†	15 homes were destroyed or damaged. Five people were injured. The NCEI database incorrectly lists a path that extends from eastern Aliceville to east-northeast of Hickory.								
FU※	Northwestern Selma	Dallas	Alabama	Unknown	November 8	10:22–?	1.5 mi (2.4 km)	400 yd (370 m)♯	Unknown
FU※	Hundreds of houses received damage, but only two to a serious degree. A vehicle was flipped onto its side as well.								
F1	S of Nelson to W of Wilsonville※	Shelby	Alabama	33.20°N 86.57°W	November 8	10:30–?	9 mi (14 km)※	40 yd (37 m)※	$25,000‡
F1	Sporadic damage was reported.								
F1	S of Blakely to near Leary※	Early, Calhoun	Georgia	31.37°N 84.93°W	November 8	14:20–?	15 mi (24 km)※	33 yd (30 m)‡	$50,000‡
F1	Seven small homes and a few larger were destroyed or damaged, along with many barns. Numerous trees were prostrated or otherwise bent in half. Fallen trees damaged a few vehicles as well. One minor injury was reported.								
F3	SE of Rocky Mount†	Wilson, Edgecombe, Bertie※	North Carolina	35.70°N 77.75°W	November 8	23:30–00:30※	40 mi (64 km)※	150 yd (140 m)‡	$750,000‡
F3	Eight homes were severely damaged or destroyed on US 64, just east of Rocky Mount. 23 farmsteads and 10 other homes were wrecked elsewhere along the path. A school was destroyed as well. 52 other structures received damage. Five people were injured. The NCEI database incorrectly lists a path from east of Drivers Store to west of Windsor via Crisp and Quitsna.								
FU※	Between Coker and Buhl	Tuscaloosa	Alabama	Unknown	November 8	Unknown	Unknown	Unknown	Unknown
FU※	A utility pole was downed.								
FU※	Unknown	Franklin	Alabama	Unknown	November 8	Unknown	Unknown	Unknown	Unknown
FU※	A few trees were felled, along with five utility poles.								

=== Possible tornadoes ===
A possible tornado occurred just south of Grenada in Grenada County, Mississippi.

== Non-tornadic effects ==
Significant thunderstorm winds were recorded throughout the event as well. On November 7, a 66-knot (76 mph; 122 km/h) wind gust was recorded in Beaumont, Texas. Two strong thunderstorm wind gusts of 65 kn (75 mph; 120 km/h) were recorded the next day in Tuscaloosa, Alabama, and at the Raleigh–Durham International Airport in Raleigh, North Carolina, respectively.

== See also ==
- List of North American tornadoes and tornado outbreaks
- Tornado outbreak of November 22–24, 2004 – Produced intense tornadoes over part of the same region

== Sources ==
- Agee, Ernest M.; Childs, Samuel (June 1, 2014). "Adjustments in Tornado Counts, F-Scale Intensity, and Path Width for Assessing Significant Tornado Destruction". Journal of Applied Meteorology and Climatology. 53 (6). American Meteorological Society: 1494–1505. doi:10.1175/JAMC-D-13-0235.1.
- Brooks, Harold E. (April 2004). "On the Relationship of Tornado Path Length and Width to Intensity". Weather and Forecasting. 19 (2): 310–19. Bibcode:2004WtFor..19..310B. doi:10.1175/1520-0434(2004)019<0310:OTROTP>2.0.CO;2.
- Cook, A. R.; Schaefer, J. T. (August 2008). "The Relation of El Niño–Southern Oscillation (ENSO) to Winter Tornado Outbreaks". Monthly Weather Review. 136 (8): 3121–3137. Bibcode:2008MWRv..136.3121C. doi:10.1175/2007MWR2171.1.
- Edwards, Roger; LaDue, James G.; Ferree, John T.; Scharfenberg, Kevin; Maier, Chris; Coulbourne, William L. (May 1, 2013). "Tornado Intensity Estimation: Past, Present, and Future". Bulletin of the American Meteorological Society. 94 (5). American Meteorological Society: 641–653. doi:10.1175/BAMS-D-11-00006.1.
- Grazulis, Thomas P. (May 1984). Violent Tornado Climatography, 1880–1982. OSTI (Technical report). NUREG. Washington, D.C.: Nuclear Regulatory Commission. OSTI 7099491. CR-3670.
  - — (November 1990). Significant Tornadoes 1880–1989. Vol. 2. St. Johnsbury, Vermont: The Tornado Project of Environmental Films. ISBN 1-879362-02-3.
  - — (July 1993). Significant Tornadoes 1680–1991: A Chronology and Analysis of Events. St. Johnsbury, Vermont: The Tornado Project of Environmental Films. ISBN 1-879362-03-1.
  - — (2001a). The Tornado: Nature's Ultimate Windstorm. Norman, Oklahoma: University of Oklahoma Press. ISBN 978-0-8061-3538-0.
  - — (2001b). F5-F6 Tornadoes. St. Johnsbury, Vermont: The Tornado Project of Environmental Films.
- National Weather Service (November 1957). Storm Data Publication (Report). National Centers for Environmental Information – via Storm Events Database.
- U.S. Weather Bureau (November 1957). "Storm data and unusual weather phenomena". Climatological Data National Summary. 8 (11). Asheville, North Carolina: National Climatic Data Center: 486–99.
