= Tornado outbreak sequence of April 2–5, 1957 =

Weather event in the United States

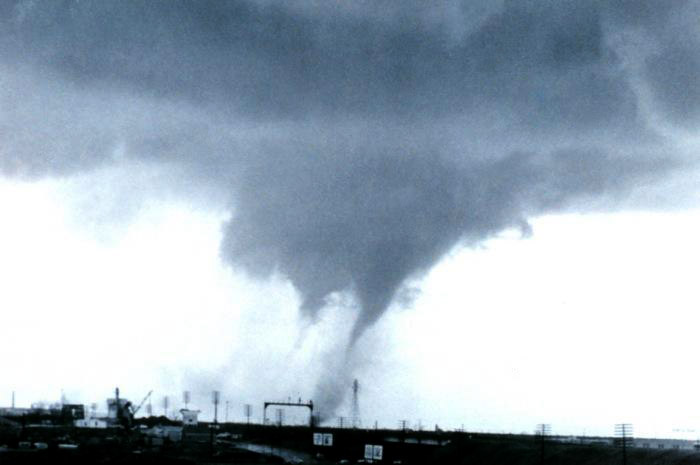
- The 1957 Dallas tornado exhibiting multiple vortices on April 2 sequence

Meteorological history
- Duration: April 2–5, 1957

Tornado outbreak
- Tornadoes: 73 confirmed
- Max. rating: F4 tornado
- Duration: 3 days, 16 hours, 35 minutes
- Largest hail: 2 1/2 in (6.4 cm) in Oklahoma on April 2 83 kn (96 mph; 154 km/h) in Toledo, Ohio, on April 5

Overall effects
- Casualties: 21 fatalities, 341 injuries
- Damage: $10.062 million (1957 USD) (Note: All losses are in 1957 USD unless otherwise noted.) $115 million (2025 USD)
- Areas affected: Central and Eastern United States
- Part of the tornadoes and tornado outbreaks of 1957

On April 2–5, 1957, a deadly tornado outbreak sequence struck most of the Southern United States. The outbreak killed at least 21 people across three states and produced at least 73 tornadoes from Texas to Virginia. The outbreak was most notable due to a tornado that hit a densely populated area of the Dallas–Fort Worth metropolitan area, killing 10 people and injuring 200 or more. The tornado, highly visible for most of its path, was at the time the most observed and best-documented tornado in recorded history; hundreds of people photographed or filmed the F3 tornado as it moved just west of Downtown Dallas. The film of this tornado is still known for its unusually high quality and sharpness, considering the photography techniques and technology of the 1950s. Damage from the Dallas tornado reached as high as $4 million (1957 USD). Besides the famous Dallas tornado, other deadly tornadoes struck portions of Mississippi, Texas, and Oklahoma. Two F4 tornadoes struck southern Oklahoma on April 2, killing five people. Three other significant, F2-rated tornadoes that day killed two people in Texas and one more in Oklahoma. An F3 tornado struck rural Mississippi on April 4, killing one more person. (Note: An outbreak is generally defined as a group of at least six tornadoes (the number sometimes varies slightly according to local climatology) with no more than a six-hour gap between individual tornadoes. An outbreak sequence, prior to (after) the start of modern records in 1950, is defined as a period of no more than two (one) consecutive days without at least one significant (F2 or stronger) tornado.) (Note: The Fujita scale was devised under the aegis of scientist T. Theodore Fujita in the early 1970s. Prior to the advent of the scale in 1971, tornadoes in the United States were officially unrated. While the Fujita scale has been superseded by the Enhanced Fujita scale in the U.S. since February 1, 2007, Canada utilized the old scale until April 1, 2013; nations elsewhere, like the United Kingdom, apply other classifications such as the TORRO scale.) (Note: Historically, the number of tornadoes globally and in the United States was and is likely underrepresented: research by Grazulis on annual tornado activity suggests that, as of 2001, only 53% of yearly U.S. tornadoes were officially recorded. Documentation of tornadoes outside the United States was historically less exhaustive, owing to the lack of monitors in many nations and, in some cases, to internal political controls on public information. Most countries only recorded tornadoes that produced severe damage or loss of life. Significant low biases in U.S. tornado counts likely occurred through the early 1990s, when advanced NEXRAD was first installed and the National Weather Service began comprehensively verifying tornado occurrences.)

== Background ==
At 6:30 a.m. CST (12:30 UTC) on Tuesday, April 2, 1957, a low-pressure system was situated over the Texas and Oklahoma panhandles, with a warm front stretching into northern Louisiana and a cold front stretching along a surface-based trough into western Texas east of El Paso, Lubbock, and Amarillo. Temperatures on that day reached the 70s in northern Texas with dew points in the upper 60s to near 70 °F (21 °C). A strong upper-level jet, abundant instability in the atmosphere, and substantial wind shear provided additional fuel for the development of supercells across the region, particularly along and just north of the warm front. A capping inversion also helped maintain lifted indices of up to -7 1/2 through late afternoon, contributing to high convective available potential energy (CAPE) for severe thunderstorm development and tornadogenesis.

== Impact ==
At around 3:00 p.m. CST (21:00 UTC), the first tornadoes touched down north of the Dallas-Fort Worth Metroplex area.

== Outbreak statistics ==
Impacts by region
Region	Locale	Deaths	Injuries	Damages	Source
United States	Arkansas	0	0	$28,000	
United States	Georgia	2	8	$855,030	
United States	Illinois	0	5	$500,000	
United States	Indiana	0	1	$60,250	
United States	Kentucky	0	0	Unknown	
United States	Louisiana	0	0	$250	
United States	Mississippi	1	83	$525,000	
United States	Missouri	0	0	$5,000	
United States	North Carolina	0	1	$300,000	
United States	Oklahoma	6	15	$3,753,000	
United States	South Carolina	0	1	$277,500	
United States	Tennessee	0	11	$275,000	
United States	Texas	12	213	$3,458,000	
United States	Virginia	0	3	$25,000	
Total		21	341	$10,062,000	

== Confirmed tornadoes ==
Confirmed tornadoes by Fujita rating
FU	F0	F1	F2	F3	F4	F5	Total
0	18	21	26	6	2	0	≥ 73

- In addition to confirmed tornadoes, a possible tornado may have destroyed a home in the Woodlawn community, near Sherman, on April 2. Another possible tornado hit Ballard County, Kentucky, on April 3, unroofing homes, destroying a drive-in theater, and uprooting trees. A loud roaring noise was heard. Another tornado may have also struck near Tansill in Pope County, Illinois, on the same date. Two other brief tornadoes may have hit near Westlake and at Tallulah, Louisiana, late on April 4.

=== Dallas, Texas ===
Dallas, Texas
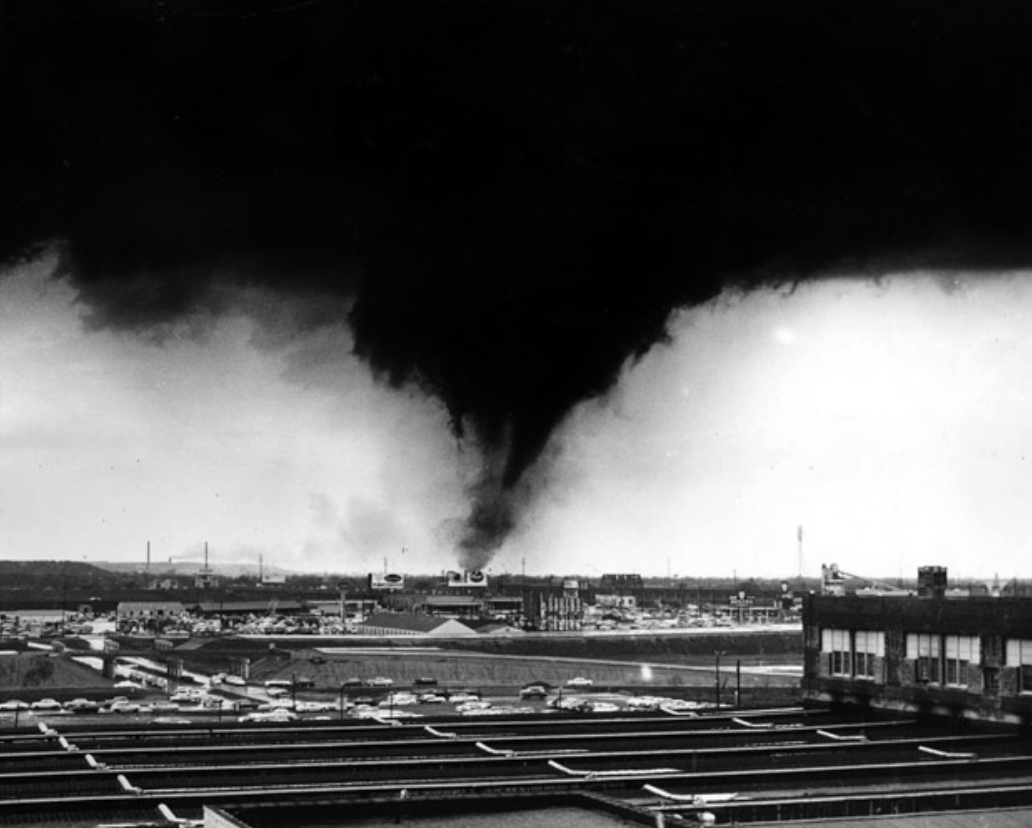
- The tornado passing through Oak Cliff.

Meteorological history
- Duration: 40 minutes

F3 tornado
- on the Fujita scale
- Highest winds: ≥ 175 mph (282 km/h)

Overall effects
- Casualties: 10 fatalities, 200+ injuries
- Damage: $2.5 million (1957 USD) $28.7 million (2025 USD)

At around 4:30 p.m. CST (some sources say 4:15 p.m. CST), this intense tornado touched down in southern Dallas County, south of modern-day Interstate 20 near Redbird Airport, and traveled northward for about 45 minutes through the Dallas neighborhoods of Oak Cliff, Kessler Park, West Dallas (only 2.5 mi (4.0 km) west of Downtown Dallas) and Love Field before lifting over Bachman Lake, west of Dallas Love Field, just after 5:00 p.m. CST. As it first touched down, the tornado was barely visible, with only a debris cloud showing at the base of the thin funnel cloud. 13 minutes later, the tornado funnel became more visible and was seen clearly to touch the ground.

The tornado reached its maximum intensity, likely in the upper range of F3, as it approached the Trinity River. In this area, between Singleton Boulevard and Riverside Drive, homes were completely swept off their foundations, and nearby railroad cars were overturned; while such damage would usually be consistent with F4 intensity, the homes had been poorly constructed, lacking wall studding and being "set on piers 8 to 12 ft (2.4 to 3.7 m) on center." Thus the tornado was officially rated F3, which is consistent with photogrammetric estimates of 175-mile-per-hour (282 km/h) peak winds in the worst-damaged area. Some time after crossing the Trinity River, the tornado weakened, and shortly afterward passed over a parking lot about 3/4 mi (1.2 km) west of the U.S. Weather Bureau office at Dallas Love Field. The funnel then entered the rope stage and dissipated just north of Bachman Lake.

In all, the Dallas tornado killed 10 and injured at least 200 (some sources say 216) others. Damage was estimated at $4 million (1957 USD). The tornado completely destroyed about 131 (some sources say 154) homes, badly damaged 111, and mildly damaged 287. Nearly 600 (some sources list 574) structures and more than 500 homes were damaged, including between nine and 28 permanent apartment buildings that were completely destroyed. Some businesses and schools were also damaged, but the Parkland Memorial Hospital was narrowly spared, as was Dallas Love Field. Another, though officially unconfirmed, tornado in Collin County, north of the city, may have briefly touched down just east of the dissipating Dallas tornado and caused damage.

The Dallas tornado was heavily documented, filmed, and photographed by several eyewitnesses as it passed through residential and commercial areas of Dallas. Visible for much of its 17-mile (27 km) path, the tornado, at the time, was the most observed in recorded history: 125 observers produced thousands of photographs and hours of high-quality, 16-mm film measuring 2,000 ft (610 m) in length. The tornado was highly visible due to its slow, 30-mile-per-hour (48 km/h) forward speed, a lack of precipitation, and its coincidence with ideal, late-afternoon lighting. Occurring shortly before the end of the workday, the tornado passed just west of Downtown Dallas and was seen by many business and factory workers. Many TV studios had time to film the tornado from rooftops.

A researcher from the Severe Weather Forecast Unit in Kansas City noticed that several old theories were proven false during the Dallas tornado. One of the theories was that all air and debris flowed inward into the funnel and then upward, but on the outside edges of the funnel debris and people were even lifted. WFAA-TV in Dallas produced a 30-minute documentary about the tornado about one week later. The tornado became the subject of several scientific papers analyzing the life cycle of and wind speed speeds in a tornado. Among the studies was the first-ever photogrammetric analysis of wind speeds in a tornado. The film of the tornado is still regarded as being of exceptionally high quality and sharpness. Additionally, structural surveys following this and the Fargo tornado later in the year provided data that contributed to the development of the Fujita scale.

== Non-tornadic effects ==
Severe thunderstorm winds reached 83 kn (96 mph; 154 km/h) in Toledo, Lucas County, Ohio, on April 5. 2 1/2-inch-diameter (6.4 cm) hail occurred in Kiowa and Latimer counties in Oklahoma on April 2.

== See also ==
- December 2015 North American storm complex – Yielded an EF4 tornado in Rowlett and Garland that killed ten people, the deadliest in the Dallas–Fort Worth Metroplex since 1957
- List of tornadoes and tornado outbreaks
  - List of North American tornadoes and tornado outbreaks
- 2000 Fort Worth tornado outbreak – Deadly F3 tornado struck Downtown Fort Worth and Arlington on March 28

== Sources ==
- Beebe, Robert G. (1960). "The Life Cycle of the Dallas Tornado". In Hoecker, Walter H. (ed.). The tornadoes at Dallas, Tex., April 2, 1957 (Report). U.S. Weather Bureau Research Paper No. 41. Washington: U.S. Department of Commerce, Weather Bureau. pp. 3–52 – via HathiTrust.
- Brooks, Harold E. (April 2004). "On the Relationship of Tornado Path Length and Width to Intensity" (PDF). Weather and Forecasting. 19 (2): 310–19. Bibcode:2004WtFor..19..310B. doi:10.1175/1520-0434(2004)019<0310:OTROTP>2.0.CO;2.
- Cook, A. R.; Schaefer, J. T. (August 2008). "The Relation of El Niño–Southern Oscillation (ENSO) to Winter Tornado Outbreaks". Monthly Weather Review. 136 (8): 3135. Bibcode:2008MWRv..136.3121C. doi:10.1175/2007MWR2171.1.
- Fujita, T. Theodore (February 1971). Proposed Characterization of Tornadoes and Hurricanes by Area and Intensity. Texas Tech University Southwest Collection/Special Collections Library (Report). Satellite and Mesometeorology Research Project Research Paper No. 91. hdl:10605/261875.
- Grazulis, Thomas P. (November 1990). Significant Tornadoes 1880–1989. Vol. 2. St. Johnsbury, Vermont: The Tornado Project of Environmental Films. ISBN 1-879362-02-3.
- Grazulis, Thomas P. (July 1993). Significant Tornadoes 1680–1991: A Chronology and Analysis of Events. St. Johnsbury, Vermont: The Tornado Project of Environmental Films. ISBN 1-879362-03-1.
- Grazulis, Thomas P. (2001a). The Tornado: Nature's Ultimate Windstorm. Norman: University of Oklahoma Press. ISBN 978-0-8061-3538-0.
- Grazulis, Thomas P. (2001b). F5-F6 Tornadoes. St. Johnsbury, Vermont: The Tornado Project of Environmental Films.
- Hoecker, Walter H. (1960) [1959]. "The Dimensional and Rotational Characteristics of the Tornadoes and Their Cloud System". Written at Washington, D.C. In Hoecker, Walter H. (ed.). The tornadoes at Dallas, Tex., April 2, 1957 (Report). U.S. Weather Bureau Research Paper No. 41. Los Angeles: UCLA. pp. 53–113 – via HathiTrust.
- Hoecker, Walter H. (May 1960b). "Wind Speed and Air Flow Patterns in the Dallas Tornado of April 2, 1957". Monthly Weather Review. 88 (5): 167–80. Bibcode:1960MWRv...88..167H. doi:10.1175/1520-0493(1960)088<0167:WSAAFP>2.0.CO;2.
- Lee, Jean T. (1960) [1958]. "The Synoptic Situation". In Hoecker, Walter H. (ed.). The tornadoes at Dallas, Tex., April 2, 1957 (Report). U.S. Weather Bureau Research Paper No. 41. Washington: U.S. Department of Commerce, Weather Bureau. pp. 114–42 – via HathiTrust.
- Williams, Dansy T. (1960) [1958]. "The Role of a Subsidence Layer". In Hoecker, Walter H. (ed.). The tornadoes at Dallas, Tex., April 2, 1957 (Report). U.S. Weather Bureau Research Paper No. 41. Washington: U.S. Department of Commerce, Weather Bureau. pp. 143–58 – via HathiTrust.
- National Weather Service (April 1957). Storm Data Publication (Report). National Centers for Environmental Information – via Storm Events Database.
- U.S. Weather Bureau (April 1957). "Storm data and unusual weather phenomena". Climatological Data National Summary. 8 (4). Asheville, North Carolina: National Climatic Data Center: 106–115.
