= Ruskin Heights =

Neighborhood of Kansas City, Missouri, U.S.

- Neighborhood
- Interactive map of Ruskin Heights
- Coordinates: 38.9213958°N 94.5052312°W
- Country: United States
- State: Missouri
- County: Jackson County
- City: Kansas City

Area
  - Total: 0.794 sq mi (2.06 km^{2})
- Elevation: 1,040 ft (320 m)

Population (2020)
  - Total: 23,874
  - Density: 30,100/sq mi (11,600/km^{2})
- ZIP Code: 64134
- GNIS feature ID: 725678

Ruskin Heights is a neighborhood in southeast Kansas City, Missouri, Jackson County. This neighborhood was made in the early 1950s as a postwar suburb on former farmland. It had a total population of 23,874 people in 2020, making it one of the most densely populated neighborhoods of Kansas City. It has a total land area of approximately 0.794 square miles (2.06 km^{2}). It is mostly flat, but slightly elevated at some points. The ZIP Code is 64134.

== History ==
=== The 1957 Ruskin Heights tornado ===
On May 20, 1957, a tornado cut a significant 71-mile path through major businesses and neighborhoods of Ruskin Heights. Rated an F5 on the Fujita scale, the tornado was the largest of the May 1957 Central Plains tornado outbreak sequence, and has been called the Ruskin Heights tornado in parts of the neighborhood. The town has since mostly recovered, but critics have criticized Ruskin Heights for building the cheapest homes it could during the tornado, and not actually putting effort into its homes.

The tornado had found its way into Jackson County through Williamsburg, and moved northeast through several counties in Missouri. Major damage occurred in many rural areas and suburbs, that including Ruskin Heights. Entire blocks of homes were completely leveled, many of which were swept way with debris and thrown long distances away through nearby fields. Some homes had their sub flooring ripped away, leaving only basements behind. Many businesses including a grocery store, a shopping center, and restaurants were completely destroyed. A few of the businesses at the shopping center sustained F5 damage. Vehicles were thrown through the air and destroyed, and the steel-reinforced Ruskin Heights High School was badly damaged.

=== The housing boom ===
In the 1970s, 1960s, and 1950s, the suburb of Ruskin Heights experienced a record high in homeowners and general population. People were moving into Ruskin Heights at record speed, even in the aftermath of the F5 tornado that had just hit it in 1957. Ruskin Heights managed to rebuild in about 10 years, but critics have criticized it, saying that it is still not the same. A total of 3,106 houses were made during the Ruskin Boom of the 1960s and 1950s. Ever since, the rate and amount of houses being built have significantly stagnated.

As Kansas City's African-American population expanded, Ruskin Heights became more diversified during the 1970s and saw its first African-American families move into the area. Along with Kansas City, Ruskin Heights has also undergone extensive rebuilding and infrastructure development. However, this has led to a soaring high in crime rates, due to poor-quality housing, and poverty. The Ruskin Heights crime-rate is 348% higher than Missouri's crime rate.

=== Modern age (1980–present) ===
In the 1980s, Bannister Mall was originated in Ruskin Heights, peaking in the same decade it was created. However, due to lack of demand and rising operation costs, it closed down for good in 2007.

Since 1990 Ruskin Heights population has fallen by 9%. During that time, many white families moved away, which set off the population decline. Caucasians made up 86 percent of the population in 1990, and 53 percent by 2000. In 2010, the area was 38 percent white and 59 percent African-American. Due to declining population, the construction and housing industries of Ruskin Heights had come to a full-stop. Other industries that revolved around physical business also started to slow down their growth as well.

== Demographics ==
=== Racial statistics ===
In the 2020 U.S. Census, the racial composition of Ruskin Heights was as follows:

- Black or African American: 63.5%
- Whites or Non-Hispanic Whites: 24.1%
- Hispanic or Latino (of any race): 8.0%
- Other race: 2,4%
- Mixed (two or more races); 2.1%
- Asian: 0.0%

=== Male and female residents in Ruskin Heights as of 2020 ===
- Male: 48.02%
- Female: 51.98%

There is no data for non-binary, transgender, and any other gendered residents as of 2020.

=== Employment in Ruskin Heights ===
- White collar workers: 70.8%
- Blue collar workers: 29.2%
- Self employed: 6.18%
- Working for private companies: 70.95%
- Governmental workers: 15%
- Working for non-profit companies: 7.88%

== Economy ==
=== The 1990s ===
The economy of Ruskin Heights in the 1990s was stagnating, mostly due to White Americans leaving, and higher crime rates. This is also when Bannister Mall began to stagnate in growth and development just like Ruskin Heights. Even though the bursting of the dot-com bubble did not have a direct impact on Ruskin Heights, the 2008 financial crisis did have a direct impact on Ruskin Heights, making it sink deeper into poverty and crime. This decade is also where Ruskin Heights started to gain a bad reputation, because the stereotype of African Americans as criminals and thugs were at its peak in the 1990s.
