= Monthly Weather Review =

- Discipline: Atmospheric sciences, meteorology
- Language: English
- Edited by: Ron McTaggart-Cowan

Publication details
- History: 1872–present
- Publisher: American Meteorological Society (United States)
- Frequency: Monthly
- Open access: Delayed, 1 year
- Impact factor: 2.8 (2023)

Standard abbreviations
- ISO 4: Mon. Weather Rev.

Indexing
- CODEN: MWREAB
- ISSN: 0027-0644 (print); 1520-0493 (web)
- LCCN: 74648196
- OCLC no.: 436659104

Links
- Journal homepage; Online access; Online archive

The Monthly Weather Review is a peer-reviewed scientific journal published by the American Meteorological Society. It covers research related to analysis and prediction of observed and modeled circulations of the atmosphere, including technique development, data assimilation, model validation, and relevant case studies. This includes papers on numerical techniques and data assimilation techniques that apply to the atmosphere and/or ocean environment. The current editor-in-chief is Ron McTaggart-Cowan (Environment and Climate Change Canada).

== History ==
The journal was first published in January 1873 by the United States Army Signal Corps, but issues were later extended back to the start of the federal government's fiscal year (July 1872). It was issued by the Office of the Chief Signal Officer until 1891. In 1891, the Signal Office's meteorological responsibilities were transferred to the Weather Bureau under the United States Department of Agriculture. The Weather Bureau published the journal until 1970 when the Bureau became part of the newly formed National Oceanic and Atmospheric Administration, which published it until the end of 1973. Since 1974, it has been published by the American Meteorological Society.

== Abstracting and indexing ==
The journal is abstracted and indexed in Current Contents/Physical, Chemical & Earth Sciences and the Science Citation Index. According to the Journal Citation Reports, the journal has a 2020 impact factor of 3.735.
