= 2025 Enderlin tornado =

EF5 tornado in North Dakota, US

Coordinates: 46.5728°N 97.6031°W

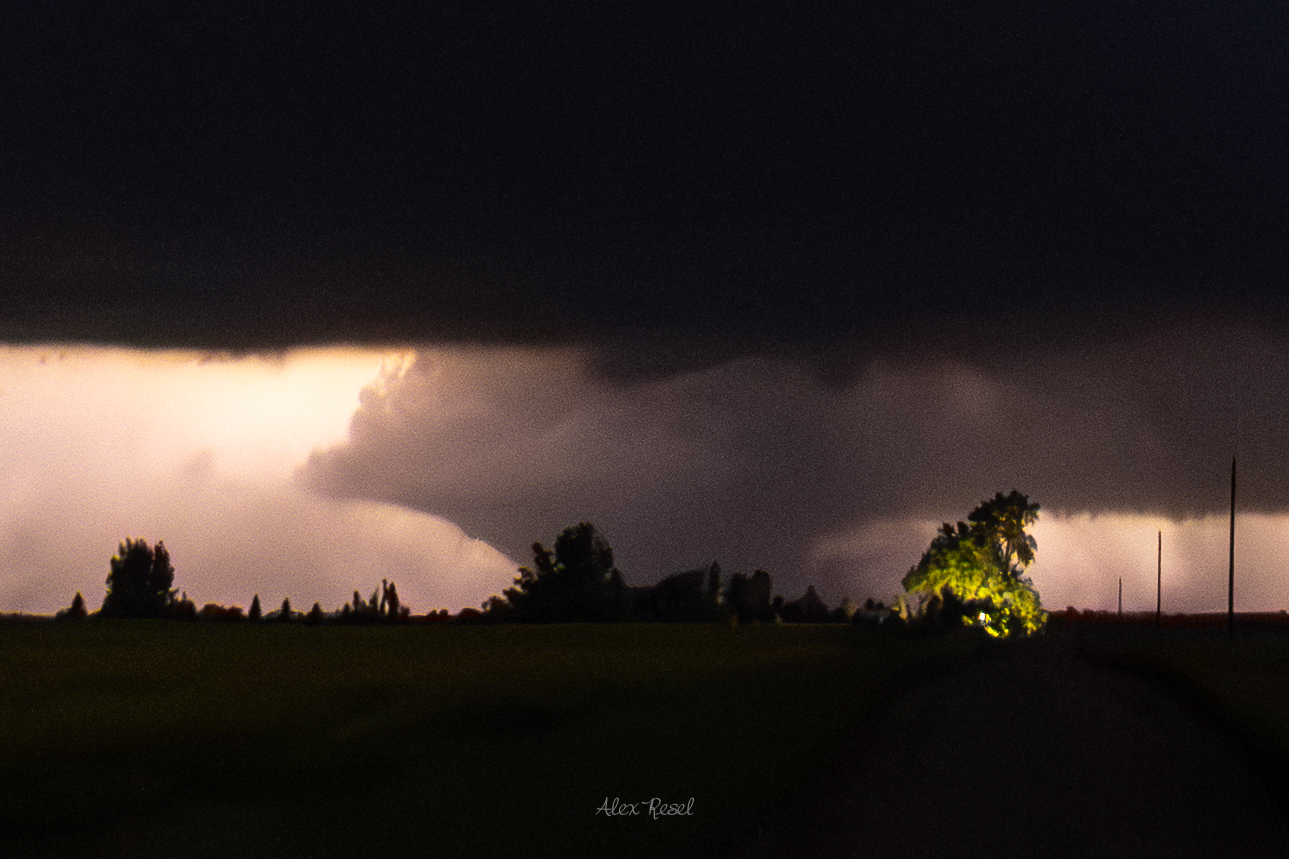
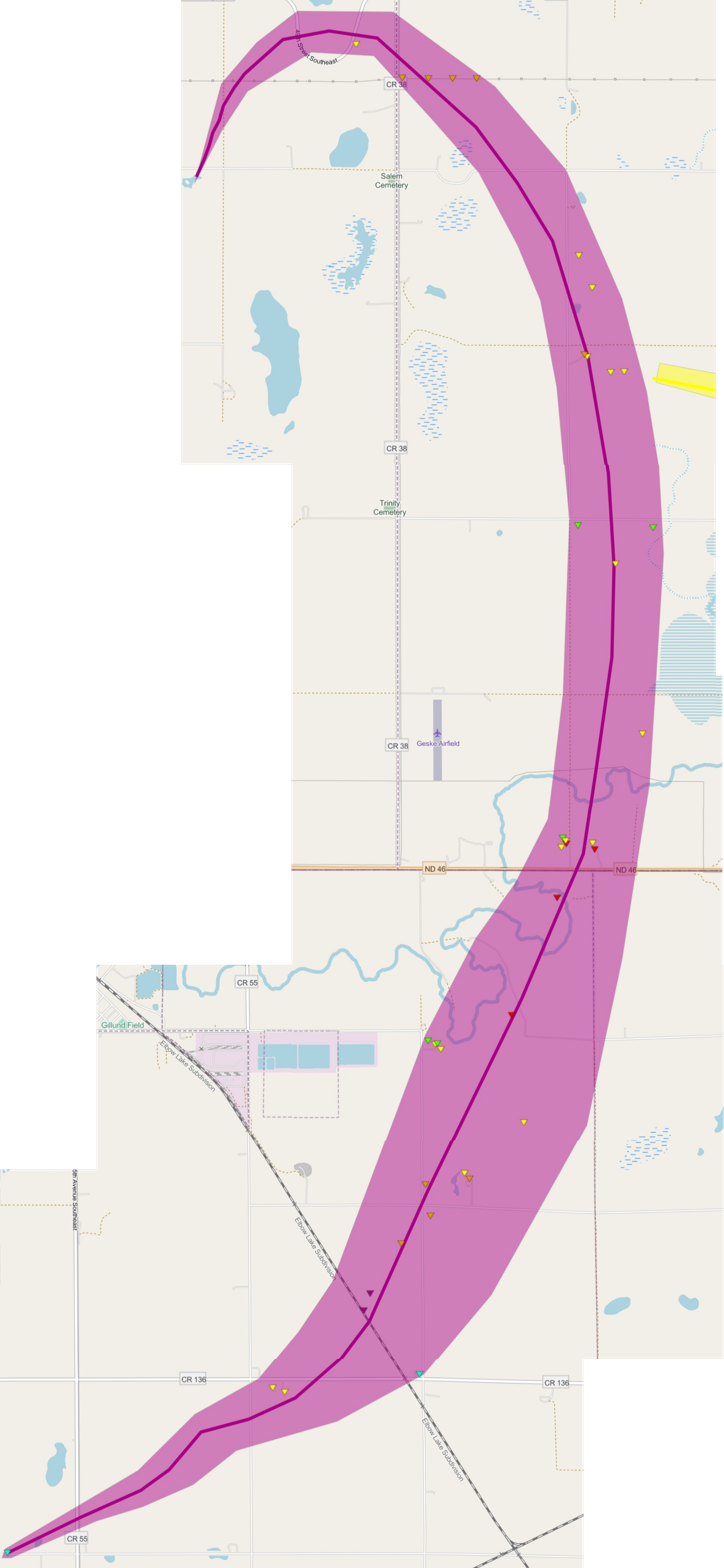
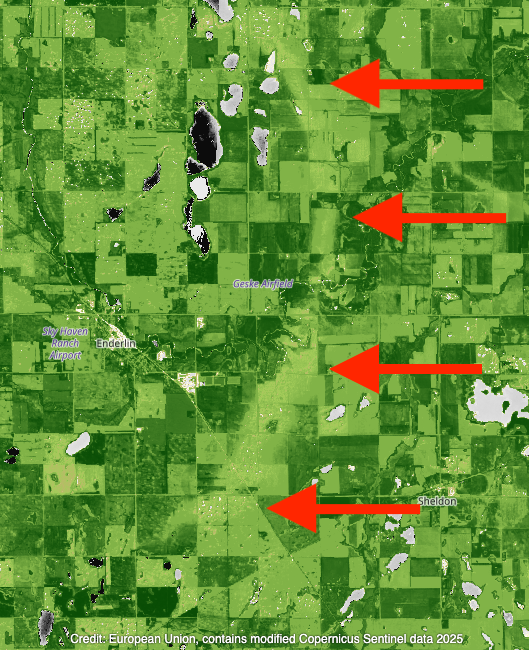
- Clockwise from top: The tornado at peak intensity southeast of Enderlin as seen by a storm chaser; Sentinel-2 satellite image of the scar left behind by the tornado; official NWS map of the track of the Enderlin tornado

Meteorological history
- Formed: June 20, 2025, 11:04 p.m. CDT (UTC–05:00)
- Dissipated: June 20, 2025, 11:20 p.m. CDT (UTC–05:00)
- Duration: 16 minutes

EF5 tornado
- on the Enhanced Fujita scale
- Max width: 1,850 yards (1.05 mi; 1.69 km)
- Path length: 12.1 miles (19.5 km)
- Highest winds: Official intensity: >210 mph (340 km/h); Unofficial intensity: >266 mph (428 km/h) (estimate from National Weather Service) (Note: While the Damage Assessment Toolkit (DAT) and the official NWS statement announcing the upgrade list the damage indicator as >210 mph, commentary by the National Weather Service in collaboration with the Northern Tornadoes Project at the University of Western Ontario's Canadian Severe Storms Laboratory mentioned that winds of >266 mph (428 km/h) were needed to loft the empty tanker car 475.7 ft (145 m).)

Overall effects
- Fatalities: 3
- Injuries: 0
- Areas affected: Ransom and Cass Counties; particularly near Enderlin, North Dakota, United States
- Part of the tornado outbreak and derecho of June 19–22, 2025 and tornado outbreaks of 2025

On the night of June 20, 2025, a large, violent, and deadly EF5 tornado moved through portions of Ransom and Cass Counties in southeastern North Dakota, United States, impacting rural areas east of Enderlin. The storm was part of an extensive tornado outbreak and derecho that took place across the northern Great Plains region of the U.S. and southern Canada from June 19–22. Internally referred to as Enderlin Tornado #1 by the National Weather Service (NWS), (Note: The National Weather Service identified a second tornado, rated EF2, in the Enderlin area.) it was the first tornado to be rated EF5 on the Enhanced Fujita scale in the U.S. in 12 years, and the most recent tornado in North Dakota to be rated that high since the 1957 F5 tornado that struck Fargo exactly 68 years earlier. During its 16-minute lifespan, it achieved a peak width of just over one mile (1.6 km) wide, and tracked a total length of 12.1 miles (19.5 km), with wind speeds in excess of 210 mph (340 km/h). Three people were killed during the storm, becoming the deadliest tornado to occur in North Dakota since the 1978 F4 tornado that struck Elgin, in Grant County.

The tornado was initially rated EF3 with maximum wind speeds estimated at 160 mph (260 km/h). In early-October 2025, its rating was later upgraded to EF5 with maximum wind speeds estimated of >210 mph (340 km/h). This was in result of additional research and forensic damage analysis conducted by the NWS office in Grand Forks, North Dakota, in collaboration with the Northern Tornadoes Project. The last EF5 tornado prior to this storm, took place in May 2013 in Moore, Oklahoma. In its wake, the Enderlin tornado destroyed multiple farmhouses and obliterated a forest along the Maple River. Following the tornado outbreak, the governor of North Dakota declared a statewide disaster. Federal relief was approved in September but stalled amid the 2025 U.S. federal government shutdown. Locals and other organizations volunteered to help with the recovery efforts.

== Meteorological synopsis ==
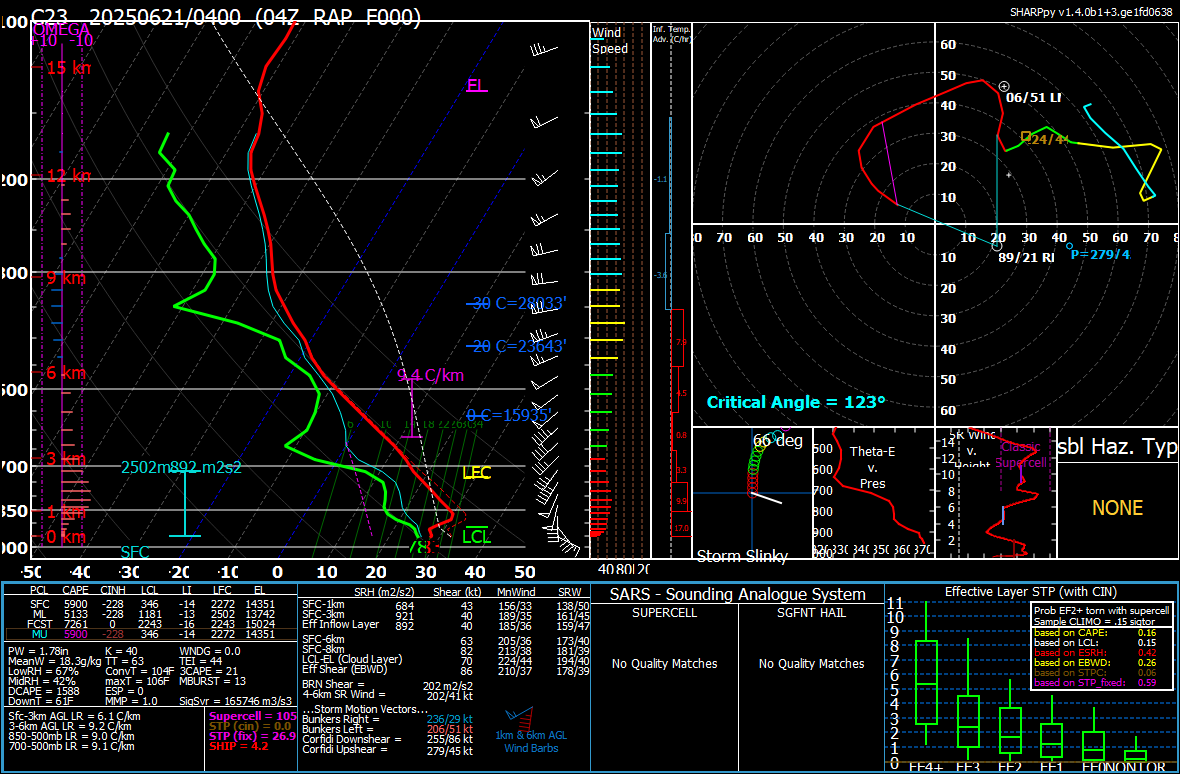
The environmental parameters, as modeled by the weather model RAP, while the Enderlin tornado was ongoing

On June 15, 2025, the Storm Prediction Center (SPC) on its Day 6 outlook forecasted that a shortwave, mid-level ridge would move into the upper Mississippi River Valley and remain over the region throughout June 20. Beneath the ridge, a moist and unstable air mass was expected to be in place from the lower to mid-Missouri River Valley, northeastward into the western Great Lakes region. Instability and deep-layer wind shear were sufficient for a localized severe weather threat, though uncertainties remained on where the greatest potential for convection was.

A seasonally strong mid-level trough was forecast to eject over the northern Great Plains on June 20, which featured moderate upper-level divergence to promote lift and deep-layer shear. The Storm Prediction Center (SPC) Day 2 outlook mentioned that "a small area of uncapped and very unstable air mass, perhaps over northeast SD and southeast ND. Here, a conditional supercell and tornado risk will exist ... very large hail and tornadoes appear likely."

At 8:15 p.m. on June 20, the SPC noted that storms developing over eastern North Dakota, while potentially elevated, were entering a favorable environment to become surface-based and pose a greater risk for hazards of severe weather. These storms followed to the southwest of a lone supercell thunderstorm, already producing large hail. As these storms moved towards the Red River, favorable low-level wind conditions were forecast to support an increased threat of tornadoes, albeit in a smaller and localized region. At this time, forecasters noted that tornadoes could be strong, with the most likely peak wind speeds from any tornado being 120–150 mph (190–240 km/h). A few tornadoes touched down before the Enderlin tornado, including an EF3 tornado near Spiritwood and two EF2 tornadoes near Valley City and Fort Ransom, respectively; both moved in a southeasterly direction towards the Enderlin area. The SPC released a mesoscale discussion concerning this with the potential for EF2/EF3–strength tornadoes to occur as a result.

== Tornado summary ==
=== Formation ===
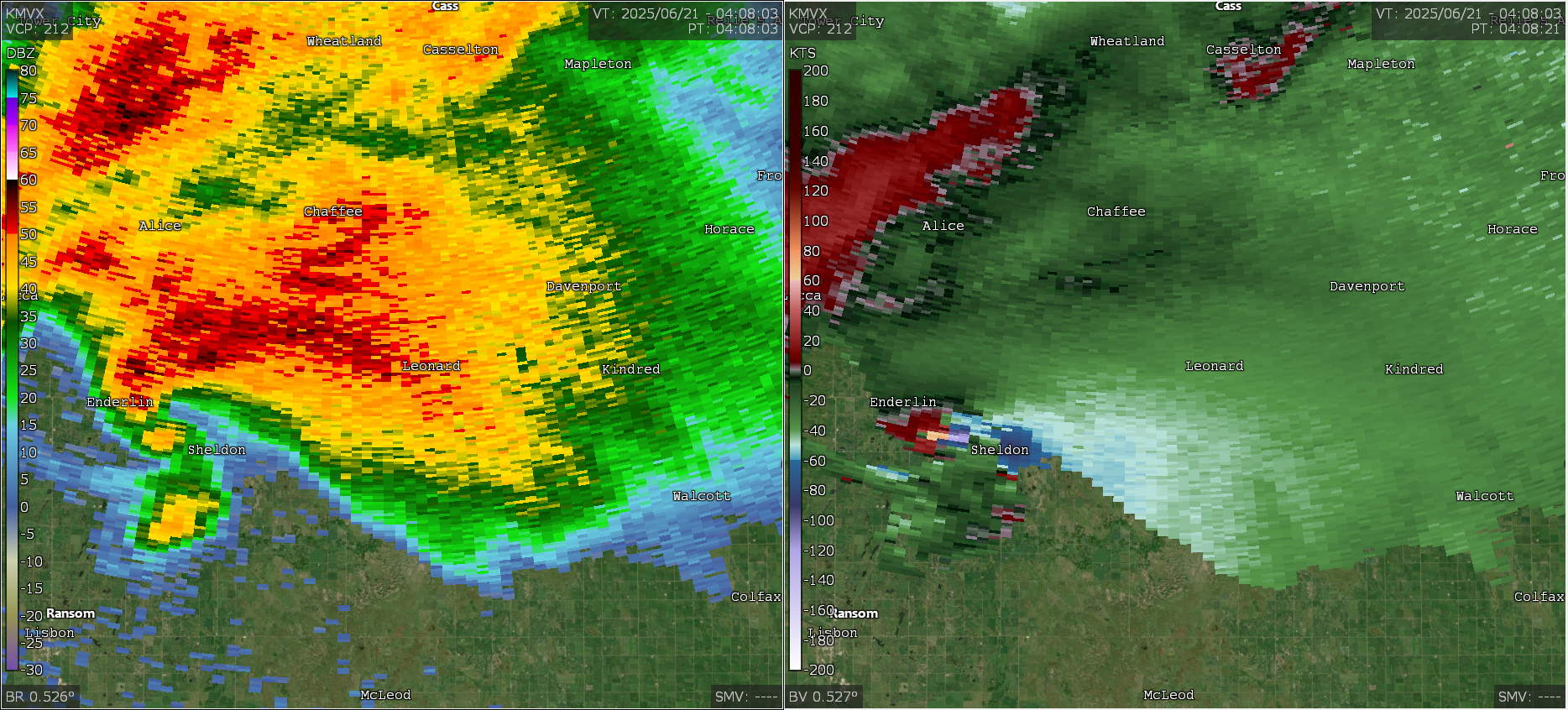
A radar scan of the tornado and parent supercell near peak intensity. Note the hook echo (left) and extremely powerful tornado vortex signature (right)

The tornado initially touched down at 11:04 p.m. Central Daylight Time (UTC–5) along 58th Street Southeast, approximately 3.8 miles (6.1 km) south of Enderlin, in Ransom County. After snapping tree branches at EF0 intensity at its touchdown point, the tornado intensified and widened as it moved east-northeastward across County Road 55 through open fields. The tornado then impacted the ADM Edible Bean Specialties grain elevator facility at the corner of 136th Avenue Southeast and County Road 136 at EF2 strength, snapping large trees and destroying an outbuilding.

=== Peak intensity in Ransom County ===
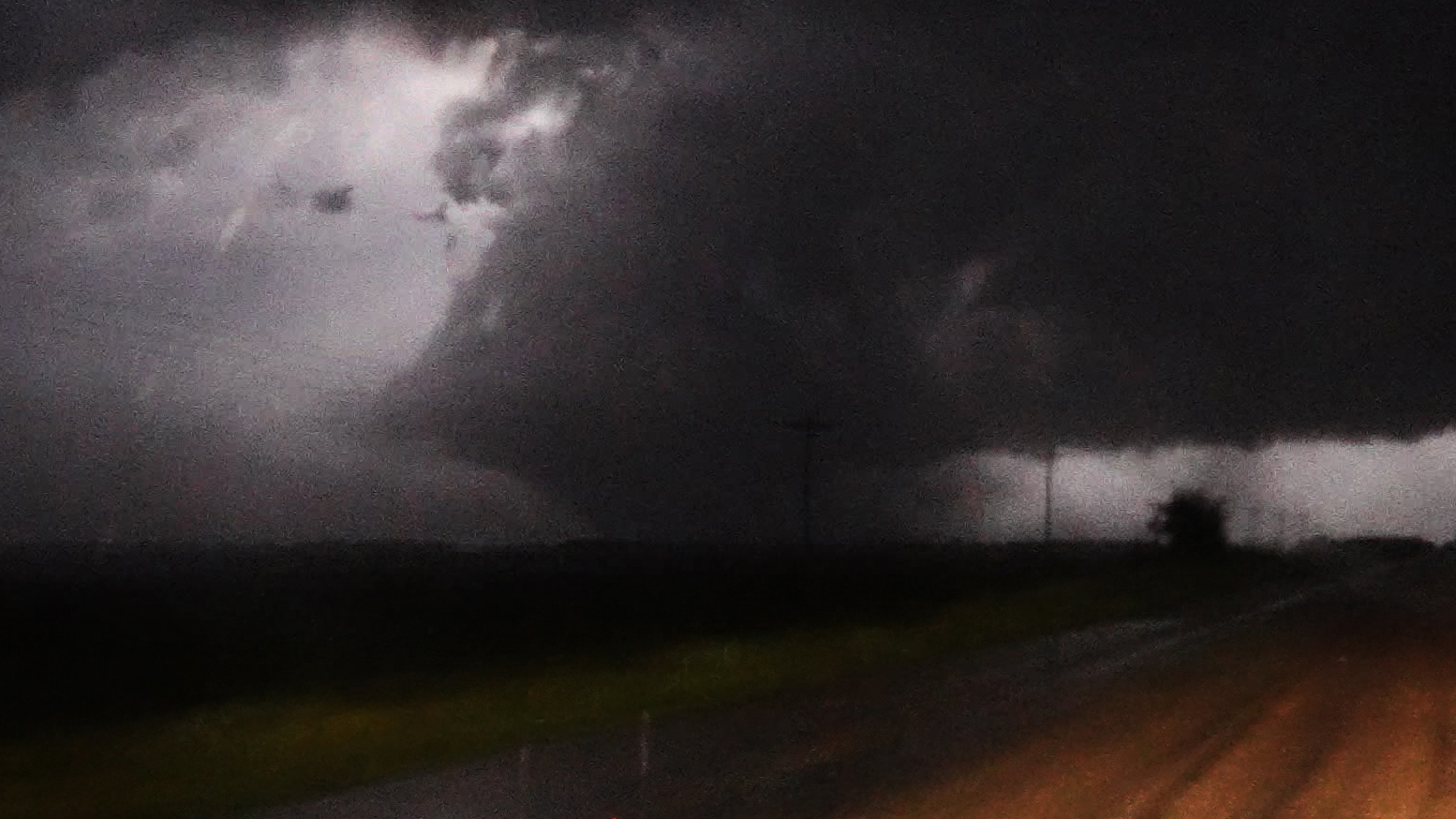
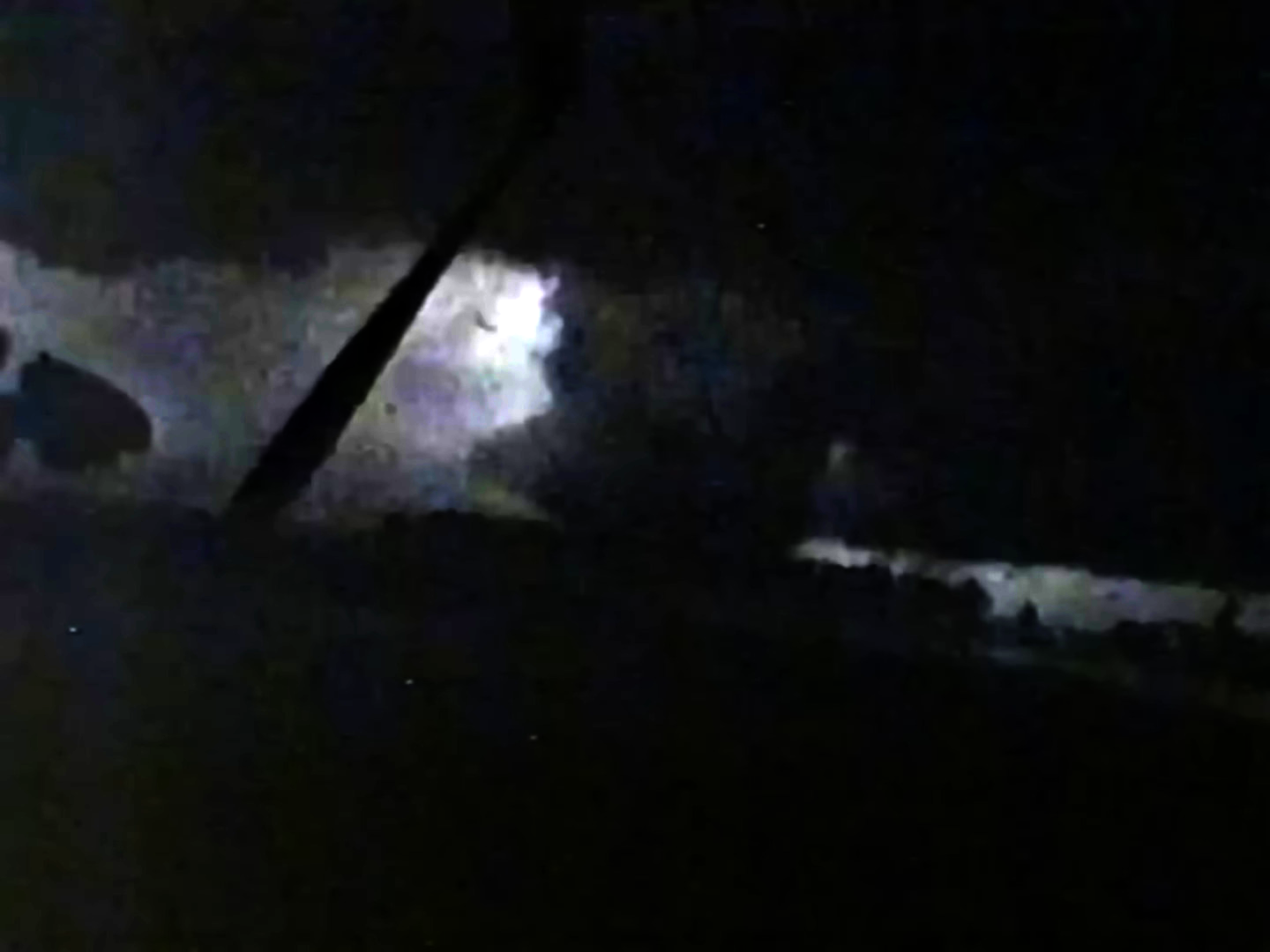
The tornado, seen southeast of Enderlin by storm chasers

The tornado then began a rapid intensification and widening phase as it turned northeastward. It reached EF5 intensity as it crossed a double-tracked section of CPKC's Elbow Lake Subdivision, to the southeast of Enderlin, derailing numerous train cars on a stopped freight train. Five train cars were lofted, and 28 more were tipped over. The tornado also bent the railroad tracks and left them covered in dirt and debris. A home that was on the edge of the path sustained minor EF0 damage to its roof as well. The tornado then turned north-northeastward, growing to its peak width of 1.05 miles (1.69 km) as it was northwest of Sheldon. Along this section of the path, a cell tower that was anchored by four cables into the ground was collapsed, crop fields were completely scoured, and large trees were snapped, with some debarked. The tornado also leveled an unoccupied farmhouse, shifted another house off its foundation, and damaged or destroyed outbuildings. Damage in this area was rated EF2 to EF3. The tornado then restrengthened to violent intensity, inflicting EF4 damage to trees as it moved along the Maple River and approached ND 46. An entire forest of trees along the river was leveled, with only stubs of the trees left behind. Severe debarking of trees was also noted, with some of them being "sandpapered," and some trees were lofted with the root ball attached, including one whose original location could not be determined.

=== Entrance into Cass County and dissipation ===
The mesocyclone of the tornado seen on a Ring doorbell

The violent tornado then crossed ND 46 into Cass County, and devastated two homesteads, with two deaths occurring in this area. The first farmhouse, along with a well-built detached garage nearby, was obliterated and swept away with all the debris scattered downwind of both structures. It was acknowledged that the tornado may have been even stronger at this location, but insufficient anchoring prevented a rating higher than mid-range EF4. The second property, located approximately 300 yd (270 m) to the west of the first along 140th Avenue Southeast, along with nearby outbuildings, was leveled. The tornado then crossed over the Maple River, leveling another swath of trees.

The tornado then turned due north and paralleled 140th Avenue Southeast, snapping trees and damaging crops at EF2 strength. It also caused EF1 damage as it crossed along 52nd Street Southeast, shattering the windows of a home and inflicting roof damage to a mobile home. The tornado then turned north-northwestward, leveling another farmhouse at high-end EF3 strength, and snapping numerous trees; one person was killed in the house. After snapping more trees at EF2 strength, the tornado turned northwestward and toppled four tall steel electrical transmission towers at low-end EF3 strength; it also snapped wooden power poles in this area as it crossed County Road 38. The tornado then quickly narrowed and weakened as it sharply looped back to the south along the southern end of the Utke Waterfowl Production Area, crossing County Road 16 twice, and snapping some additional hardwood tree trunks at EF2 strength before dissipating just west of the 50th Street SE and 138th Avenue Southeast intersection at 11:20 p.m. Central Daylight Time (UTC–5), approximately 5 miles (8.0 km) southwest of Alice.

Overall, the tornado was on the ground for 16 minutes, had a path length of 12.1 miles (19.5 km), and reached a peak width of 1.05 miles (1.69 km). According to the Enderlin–Sheldon Fire Department, 10 homes sustained some form of damage from the storm. Shortly after the dissipation of the initial Enderlin tornado, a second large tornado formed just east of the first tornado's path at 11:22 p.m. CDT. Moving southeast, this second tornado caused EF2 damage to trees and outbuildings across a 6.82 miles (10.98 km) path before dissipating at 11:34 p.m. CDT.

== Aftermath ==
The city of Enderlin itself was not struck by the tornado, although it lost power due to the storm. Debris fallout from the tornado extended to Moorhead, Minnesota, 40 miles (64 km) from where they originated. Here, a photograph and a tax return form, both belonging to two different people killed in the tornado, were found after the storm carried them there.

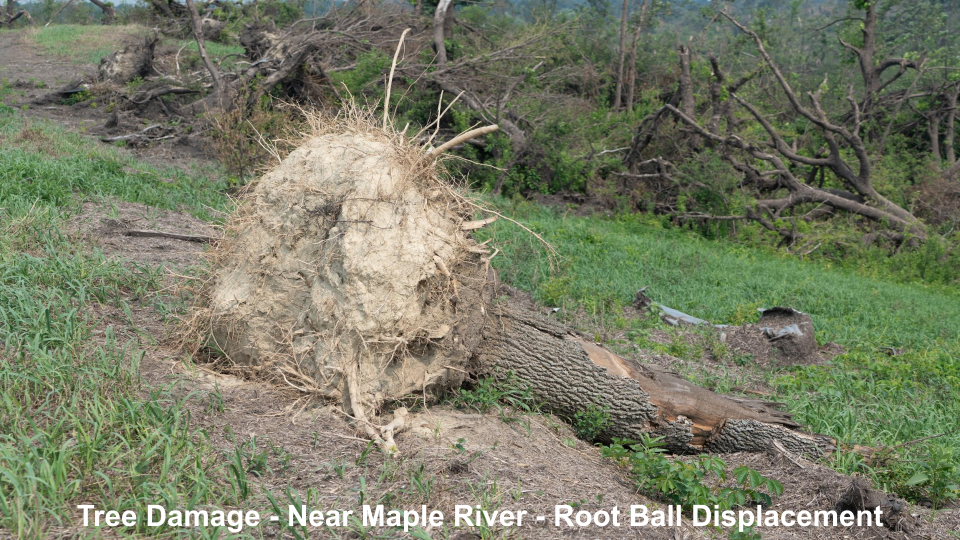
EF4-rated root ball displacement caused by the tornado

North Dakota state governor Kelly Armstrong declared a statewide disaster following the tornado, activating the state's "Emergency Operations Plan". On June 24, over 150 volunteers joined in a joint cleanup operation. The International Red Cross and Red Crescent Movement sent disaster teams to Enderlin to aid in recovery efforts, and volunteers from the Northern Plains UAS Test Site deployed an Unmanned Aerial System to help residents find personal items that had been lost as a result of the tornado. North Bank set up a fund for victims of the tornado, and the Enderlin Fire Department assisted in initial clean-up efforts.

The 2025 United States federal government shutdown, which was ongoing at the time of the tornado's upgrade to an EF5 rating, made disaster assistance unavailable until the shutdown ended; President Donald Trump had approved Federal Emergency Management Agency (FEMA) disaster relief to assist the month prior.

The day after the tornado, NWS crews from both Bismarck and Grand Forks, began conducting their damage surveys across portions of primarily southern North Dakota, and northern Minnesota. The Grand Forks weather office, assigned a preliminary EF3 rating for the Enderlin tornado. The tornado initially had a maximum width of a mile, or 1,760 yards (1,610 m) at its largest, and tracked a path 12 miles (19 km) long. Peak winds were estimated to be around 160 miles per hour (260 km/h).

=== Casualties ===
The tornado killed three people, all in the vicinity of Enderlin. The three deaths occurred at two locations along the tornado's path in Cass County. The first two deaths occurred at a farmstead along ND 46. The victims were identified as both 73-year old Michael and Katherine Pfaff-Dehn. The third fatality occurred to the north, where 89-year old Macario Lucio died in his farmhouse along the intersection of 140th Avenue and 51st Street Southeast. It was the deadliest tornado to strike the state since 1978, when an F4 tornado killed five people in Elgin.

== Legacy ==
=== Mural ===
The memorial that commentates the 3 lives lost during the tornado

In 2026, a mural was painted across the outside brick of the bowling alley, Tri-County Lanes, in downtown Enderlin. The mural depicts a bright and fiery phoenix on an overall dark background. The darker imagery reflects the storm and it's challenges, located at the bottom as it is not intended to be the main focus of the mural. Within the feathers of the phoenix, three items are depicted in tribute to the victims of the tornado: a bingo card, a paintbrush, and a fishing rod. The symbol of the bird was inspired by the local school's mascot, the Enderlin Eagles. “[Survivors of the storm] didn’t want the tornado to be central to the whole idea, there’s a lot of other things that went into the thought behind the mural,” mentioned the mural's designer, Bismarck-based artist Mel Gordon, in an interview with KFYR-TV. “There’s still a lot of raw emotions there that I think art really helps heal.” Volunteers as young as 5 years old and as old as 80 partook in the painting process of the mural. One of the volunteers, Katy Cole, said that the artwork project was a rare chance to contribute something dearly to the town of Enderlin. “I have limitations as to where I can get in a small town. This was something I could do. [...] I could use my walker as a brace and paint.”

=== TraXside Cafe donations ===
In the immediate aftermath of the tornado, TraXside Cafe became a hub where families, volunteers, and utility crews gathered following the storm. “We did a lot of feeding the families and feeding the crews here,” said cafe owner Roxy Johnson. The cafe received an abundance of donations from patrons, including a singular donation of $10,000 USD. With the tens of thousands of dollars accrued over months of donations, Johnson contacted the local Lions Club, who were taking part in rebuilding projects of Enderlin and surrounding areas. A year later in 2026, community leaders discussed the idea of using the given funds to replant trees to aid in the restoration of the environment damaged by the tornado. “You don’t know what it’s like living in a small town until something like this happens, boy, and then you realize you’re lucky. Very lucky,” said Johnson in her statement to KVLY-TV.

== Rating upgrade ==
EF5-rated damage to several full grain train cars and empty tank cars tossed and derailed near Enderlin

On October 6, 2025, NWS Grand Forks, with assistance from several engineers including Timothy P. Marshall, released a revised survey of the Enderlin tornado. Its final rating was upgraded to EF5 on the Enhanced Fujita scale, with maximum winds estimated to be over 210 miles per hour (340 km/h; 94 m/s). The tornado also caused high-end damage in other areas, although the construction at these areas limited said damage points to being upgraded from high-end EF3 to mid-range EF4. The strong winds correlated to the indicated winds on the WSR-88D Storm-Relative Velocity data from the Grand Forks radar site.

The intensity of the tornado was calculated from the distances the train cars were lofted and thrown. This new method was outlined in a study authored by a team of scientists and engineers of the Northern Tornadoes Project, and published in the peer-reviewed journal Monthly Weather Review in 2024. In this study, researchers with the Northern Tornadoes Project found an empirical relationship between the distance large and compact objects, such as farm equipment and vehicles, were thrown by the tornado, and damage indicators corresponding to ratings on the Enhanced Fujita scale. The study used tornadoes throughout Canada as examples, and found that these tornadoes, which occurred near Alonsa, Manitoba on August 3, 2018, Scarth, Manitoba, on August 7, 2020, and Didsbury, Alberta, on July 1, 2023, were all most likely of EF5 intensity, based on Monte Carlo simulations on cumulative distribution functions showing the likelihood of lofting at each wind speed based on the weight and distance of objects lofted.

In all, it was determined that 33 cars on the train derailed; 19 of them were fully loaded grain hopper cars weighing up to 286,000 lb (130,000 kg) that were all tipped over, with one of them being pulled off the tracks and thrown into an adjacent field. The other 14 cars were empty tanker cars weighing up to 72,000 lb (33,000 kg). Four of the cars were thrown out into the field, including one that was tossed 600–1,000 ft (180–300 m), landing 475.7 ft (145.0 m) away from the previous tank car it was attached to. Wheel sets from the derailed cars detached at the locations where the cars came off the rails. Collaborating with wind damage experts and the Northern Tornadoes Project, the NWS determined that winds of 230 mph (370 km/h) were needed to tip over a fully loaded grain car and winds of over 266 mph (428 km/h) to throw a tank car 475.7 ft (145.0 m). In addition, extreme radar measurements were observed around the time that EF5-rated damage was being inflicted. It was also determined that the train cars were lofted twice as far as the EF5 threshold distance and four times heavier than the heaviest object model in the reanalysis. Prior to the reanalysis, the damage to the train cars had been left unrated since train cars are not standard damage indicators.

Melinda Beerends, meteorologist in charge of the National Weather Service office in Grand Forks, stated that "In the last kind of 12 years, there's been several strong tornadoes that have come close, but there haven't been known damage indicators at that time to support the EF5 rating ... it's hard sometimes to get tornadoes to hit something." The upgraded rating ended the EF5 drought that had begun following the 2013 EF5 tornado that devastated Moore, Oklahoma. The tornado was additionally the first F5 or EF5-rated tornado to occur in the month of June in the United States since the 1992 F5 tornado near Chandler, Minnesota.

== See also ==
- List of F5, EF5, and IF5 tornadoes
- Fargo tornado – a violent F5 tornado that occurred exactly 68 years earlier on June 20, 1957
- Greensburg tornado – another nighttime EF5 tornado in Kansas with a pronounced leftward turn at the end of its lifespan
- 1998 Spencer tornado – a violent F4 tornado in South Dakota that also occurred alongside a derecho
