= Tornado outbreak sequence of June 20–23, 1957 =

Weather event in the United States

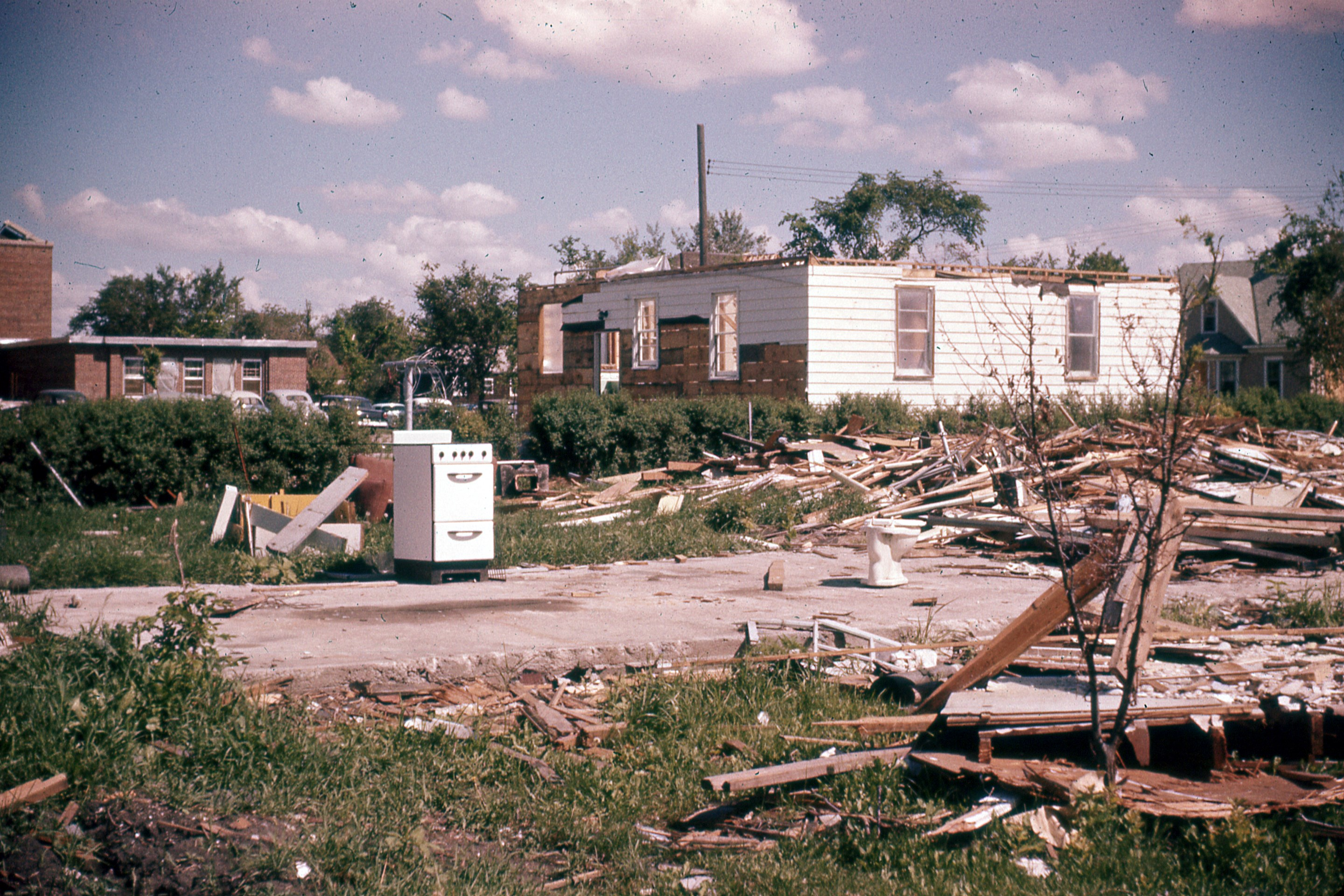
- Remains of homes destroyed by the F5 tornado in Fargo.

Meteorological history
- Formed: June 20, 1957
- Dissipated: June 23, 1957

Tornado outbreak
- Tornadoes: 23
- Max. rating: F5 tornado
- Duration: 4 days
- Highest winds: 115 mph (185 km/h) (Downtown Kansas City)
- Lowest pressure: 998 hPa (mbar); 29.47 inHg
- Largest hail: 4.5 in (11 cm) (northeast of Fort Stockton, Texas)

Overall effects
- Fatalities: 11
- Injuries: 105
- Damage: $25.9 million (1957 USD)
- Areas affected: Great Plains, Great Lakes
- Part of the tornado outbreaks of 1957

A deadly and destructive outbreak sequence (Note: An outbreak is generally defined as a group of at least six tornadoes (the number sometimes varies slightly according to local climatology) with no more than a six-hour gap between individual tornadoes. An outbreak sequence, prior to (after) the start of modern records in 1950, is defined as a period of no more than two (one) consecutive days without at least one significant (F2 or stronger) tornado.) of 23 tornadoes struck parts of the Great Plains and the Great Lakes in late-June 1957. At least seven significant tornadoes (F2+) touched down during the outbreak sequence. The most devastating storm was a large, violent, and extremely destructive 500-yard-wide F5 tornado family that struck Fargo, North Dakota on Thursday, June 20, 1957, killing 10 people and becoming the deadliest tornado ever recorded in North Dakota. The outbreak caused 11 fatalities, 105 injuries, and $25.883 million in damage.

== Meteorological Synopsis ==
On June 20, 1957, a combination of strong instability and vertical wind shear, high storm-relative helicity (SRH), favorable storm-relative flow (SRF), and lowered lifted condensation levels (LCLs) set up over the High Plains. Boundary-layer moisture was also present, which was enhanced via evapotranspiration (ET) and moisture convergence. A shortwave ridge then centered itself over the region and, despite only modest forcing, a trough spawned a low-pressure area over Southwestern North Dakota. It then moved northeastward into the central part of the state, where temperatures and dewpoints were in the lower 80s and lower 70s respectfully. Although bulk shear was not quite high enough to support long-tracked supercells, meteorologist did indicate that an outbreak of severe thunderstorms along with a significant to violent tornado or two was possible.

That afternoon, a thunderstorm complex over Devil's Lake, North Dakota produced an outflow boundary that further enhanced the low-level convergence zone in Eastern North Dakota and Western Minnesota. An isolated supercell formed in the warm sector of the low pressure system and took advantage of this favorable environment, dropping five tornadoes, including the F5 tornado in Fargo (although the tornado family has been listed as one tornado). Four other tornadoes were confirmed on that day, although most were brief, but some were strong as well.

== Confirmed tornadoes ==
Confirmed tornadoes by Fujita rating
FU	F0	F1	F2	F3	F4	F5	Total
0	9	7	5	1	0	1	23

=== June 20 event ===
Confirmed tornadoes – Thursday, June 20, 1957 (Note: All dates are based on the local time zone where the tornado touched down; however, all times are in Coordinated Universal Time and dates are split at midnight CST/CDT for consistency.) (Note: Prior to 1994, only the average widths of tornado paths were officially listed.)
F#	Location	County / Parish	State	Start coord.	Time (UTC)	Path length	Max. width	Summary
F2	S of Oakes	Dickey	ND	46.1°N 98.1°W	00:30–?	2 miles (3.2 km)	30 yards (27 m)	Damages were estimated at $25,000 (1957 USD). Tornado researcher Thomas P. Grazulis did not list this tornado as an F2 or stronger.
F0	SSE of Warren	Cass	ND	46.7°N 97°W	00:30–?	0.1 miles (0.16 km)	10 yards (9.1 m)	Brief tornado occurred southwest of Fargo, North Dakota with little to no damage.
F5	Wheatland, ND to Fargo, ND to S of Winnipeg Junction, MN	Cass (ND), Clay (MN)	ND, MN	46.9°N 97.35°W	00:40–04:10	52.4 miles (84.3 km)	500 yards (460 m)	10 deaths – See article on this tornado – Later analysis has determined that this was a family of at least five tornadoes. The death toll may be 12. 103 people were injured and damages were estimated at $25.250 million (1957 USD).
F0	Southern Fergus Falls	Otter Tail	MN	46.27°N 96.08°W	01:30–?	0.1 miles (0.16 km)	10 yards (9.1 m)	The amount of damage is unknown.
F2	WNW of Ashton	Spink	SD	45.02°N 98.63°W	04:00–?	0.1 miles (0.16 km)	10 yards (9.1 m)	1 death – A mobile home, four barns, and a residence were destroyed or unroofed. Damages were estimated at $25,000 (1957 USD).

=== June 21 event ===
List of confirmed tornadoes – Friday, June 21, 1957
F#	Location	County / Parish	State	Start coord.	Time (UTC)	Path length	Max. width	Summary
F1	SSW of Holyoke	Yuma	CO	40.4°N 102.45°W	08:15–?	0.1 miles (0.16 km)	10 yards (9.1 m)	Damages were estimated at $2,500 (1957 USD).
F3	Waco to Utica	York	NE	40.9°N 97.47°W	00:15–?	5.4 miles (8.7 km)	10 yards (9.1 m)	An intense tornado moved eastward between the towns of Waco and Utica, destroying or damaging barns and outbuildings on 16 farms. Damages was estimated at $250,000 (1957 USD). Downbursts produced a 3-mile-wide (4.8 km) swath of damage as well. Grazulis classified the tornado as an F2.
F1	Bellwood	Butler	NE	41.35°N 97.32°W	00:30–?	1 mile (1.6 km)	100 yards (91 m)	Damages were estimated at $250 (1957 USD).
F0	Northern Valparaiso	Saunders	NE	41.10°N 96.83°W	00:52–?	0.1 miles (0.16 km)	10 yards (9.1 m)	Damages were estimated at $30 (1957 USD).
F0	ESE of Norway	Republic	KS	39.70°N 97.75°W	02:00–?	0.1 miles (0.16 km)	10 yards (9.1 m)	The amount of damage is unknown.
F1	Western Hutchinson	Reno	KS	38.07°N 97.98°W	03:14–?	0.1 miles (0.16 km)	10 yards (9.1 m)	A trucking terminal was unroofed and a man may have been killed as a result. Widespread downbursts obscured the distinction between tornado and downburst damage and damage estimates are unknown as well. Grazulis classified the tornado as an F2.
F0	NNW of Benton to ESE of Hurley	Sedgwick	KS	37.83°N 97.15°W	04:09–?	2.3 miles (3.7 km)	100 yards (91 m)	Tornado caused $2,500 (1957 USD) in damage to farmlands.
F1	E of De Soto to Zarah to S of Lake Quivera	Johnson	KS	38.98°N 94.93°W	05:30–?	9 miles (14 km)	400 yards (370 m)	A destructive tornado moved directly through Zarah, west of Shawnee in the western suburbs of Kansas City. It injured two people and caused $250,000 (1957 USD) in damage.

=== June 22 event ===
Confirmed tornadoes – Saturday, June 22, 1957
F#	Location	County / Parish	State	Start coord.	Time (UTC)	Path length	Max. width	Summary
F2	Southern Kansas City to Birmingham to Liberty	Jackson	MO	39°N 94.58°W	06:00–?	19.8 miles (31.9 km)	10 yards (9.1 m)	A strong tornado moved through the eastern side of Kansas City, causing $250 (1957 USD) in damage.
F0	Southern Albert Lea	Freeborn	MN	43.62°N 93.37°W	16:00–?	0.1 miles (0.16 km)	10 yards (9.1 m)	A brief tornado caused little to no damage.
F2	Hudsonville	Ottawa	MI	42.87°N 85.87°W	21:30–?	0.1 miles (0.16 km)	10 yards (9.1 m)	Major damage occurred in Downtown Hudsonville from this brief, but strong tornado. Businesses and homes were damaged or destroyed and trees were downed. Damage was estimated at $25,000 (1957 USD). This came just over one year after an F5 tornado caused major damage on the south side of town.
F1	Eau Claire to SW of Decatur	Ottawa, Cass	MI	41.98°N 86.3°W	22:05–?	10.7 miles (17.2 km)	50 yards (46 m)	This tornado moved directly through Eau Claire, causing $25,000 (1957 USD) in damage.
F0	Dumont Lake	Allegan	MI	42.6°N 85.87°W	22:10–?	1 mile (1.6 km)	10 yards (9.1 m)	Weak tornado passed near Dumont Lake, causing $30 (1957 USD) in damage.
F2	Southwestern Bay City	Bay	MI	43.58°N 83.92°W	00:00–?	0.1 miles (0.16 km)	10 yards (9.1 m)	Brief, but strong tornado caused heavy destruction southwest of Bay City, totaling $25,000 (1957 USD) in damage.
F1	SSW of Campo	Baca	CO	37.07°N 102.67°W	03:00–?	0.1 miles (0.16 km)	10 yards (9.1 m)	Brief tornado touchdown in the West Ute Canyon, causing $250 (1957 USD) in damage.
F0	N of Denver City to S of Plains	Yoakum	TX	33.07°N 102.83°W	04:00–?	0.1 miles (0.16 km)	10 yards (9.1 m)	Little to no damage occurred.
F1	Finney	Hale	TX	34.28°N 101.7°W	04:18–?	0.5 miles (0.80 km)	10 yards (9.1 m)	A tornado struck the town of Finney north of Plainview and Seth Ward, causing $2,500 (1957 USD) damage.

=== June 23 event ===
Confirmed tornadoes – Sunday, June 23, 1957
F#	Location	County / Parish	State	Start coord.	Time (UTC)	Path length	Max. width	Summary
F0	Copeland	Gray	KS	37.55°N 100.62°W	08:15–?	0.1 miles (0.16 km)	10 yards (9.1 m)	Tornado touched down just northeast of Copeland, barely missing the town and causing little to no damage.

=== Fargo Tornado Family ===
Fargo Tornado Family
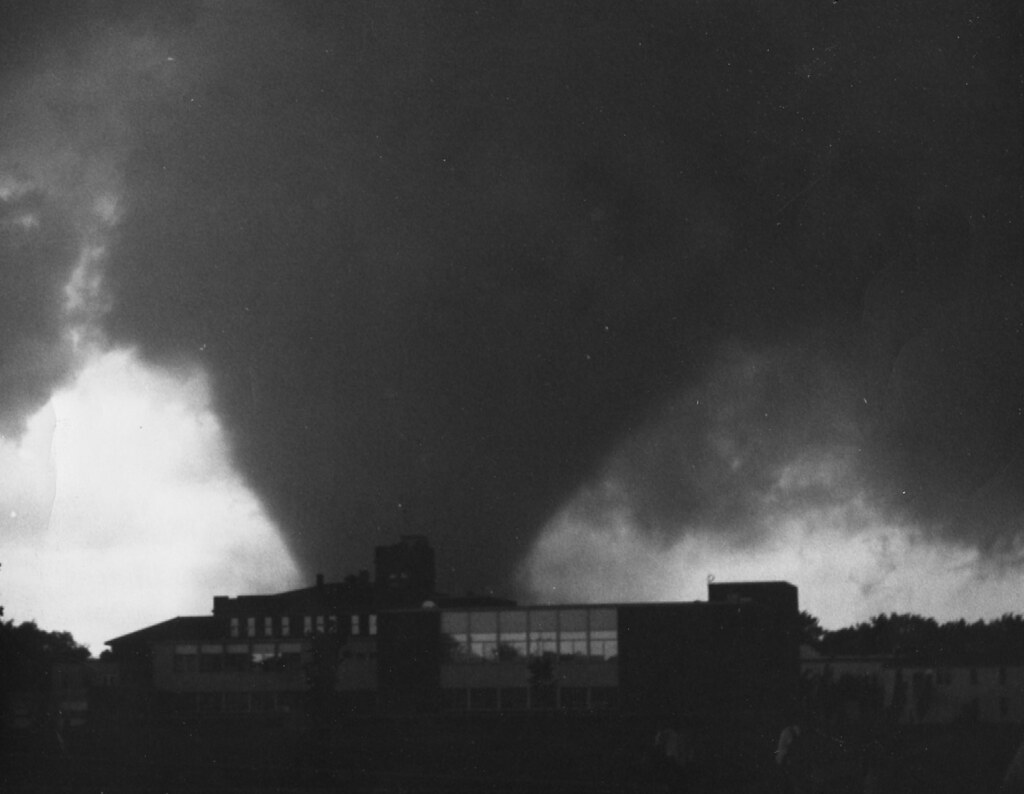
- The Fargo Tornado seen from east of the N.D.A.C Memorial Student Union Building

Meteorological history
- Formed: June 20, 1957; 4:40 p.m. CDT (UTC−06:00)
- Dissipated: June 20, 1957; 8:10 p.m. CDT (UTC−06:00)
- Duration: 3 hours, 30 minutes

F5 tornado
- on the Fujita scale
- Highest winds: 275 mph (442.57 km/h)

Overall effects
- Fatalities: 10-12
- Injuries: 103
- Damage: $25.250 million (1957 USD) $297 million (2025 USD)

This destructive F5 tornado tore directly through Downtown Fargo, killing 10 and injuring 103. The supercell produced the first tornado at 5:40 pm CDT near Wheatland, North Dakota. The weak F0 tornado moved east-northeast, tossing haybales and damaging crops. After 11 miles (18 km), the tornado lifted and another tornado touched down just to its south. It struck the town of Casselton at F2 intensity, causing major damage. After traveling 5 miles (8.0 km) the tornado lifted and supercell continued to the east for about 10 miles (16 km) without producing a tornado, although a consistent wall cloud was present.

As it neared Fargo, the cell dropped another tornado over West Fargo. As it traveled east, it began to rapidly intensify, grew to 500 yards (460 m), and became violent as it struck Fargo. Numerous homes, businesses, and vehicles were damaged and destroyed. One neighborhood had multiple homes that were completely swept away and all 10 fatalities occurred here. Damage at this location was rated F5. The tornado then weakened, but remained strong as it crossed the Red River into Moorhead, Minnesota, damaging more buildings and homes. The tornado then turned sharply north and dissipated after being on the ground for 9 miles (14 km) and injuring 103. After continuing another 5 miles (8.0 km), the supercell dropped a fourth tornado, which quickly became a violent F4 storm as it moved eastward through Glyndon. It then turned northeastward, and produced significant tree damage along the Buffalo River before completely destroying a family farm. Significant damage was observed on a second farm before the tornado abruptly turned north and dissipated after traveling 10 miles (16 km). The cell traveled about 5 miles (8.0 km), before dropping one final F3 tornado in Dale. It traveled for 7 miles (11 km), destroying a family farm as it occluded northward. A clock inside the residence stopped at 9:05 pm CDT, when the tornado struck. The tornado dissipated five minutes later at 9:10 pm CDT.

The family of tornadoes traveled a total 52.4 miles (84.3 km), was 500 yards (460 m) wide at its peak, and was rated F5 when the Fujita scale came into effect in 1973. Although numerous studies indicate that this was a tornado family, it is officially listed as one continuous tornado. A total of 10 people were killed (some sources list the death toll as 12) and 103 others were injured with all the casualties occurring in Fargo, making it the deadliest tornado ever recorded in North Dakota. Damage was estimated $25.25 million (1957 USD).

== Non-tornadic impacts ==
Along with tornadoes, numerous reports of strong winds and large hail occurred during the period. June 20 saw baseball-sized hail south of Valley City in Barnes County, North Dakota. Later, a 94 mph (151 km/h) wind gust was recorded just southeast of Ruskin Park, South Dakota. The next day, a 100 mph (160 km/h) wind gust was recorded just northwest of Castleton, Kansas. Just after midnight on June 22 in the Kansas City metropolitan area, an 92 mph (148 km/h) was recorded in Parkville, Missouri. The strongest winds from the event were in Downtown Kansas City, where wind gusts reached as high as 115 mph (185 km/h). The next day, a massive 4.5 in (11 cm) hailstone was documented northeast of Fort Stockton, Texas, the largest from the event.

== See also ==
- List of F5 and EF5 tornadoes
- List of tornadoes and tornado outbreaks
  - List of North American tornadoes and tornado outbreaks
