= Fargo tornado =

1957 tornado in the U.S. states of North Dakota and Minnesota

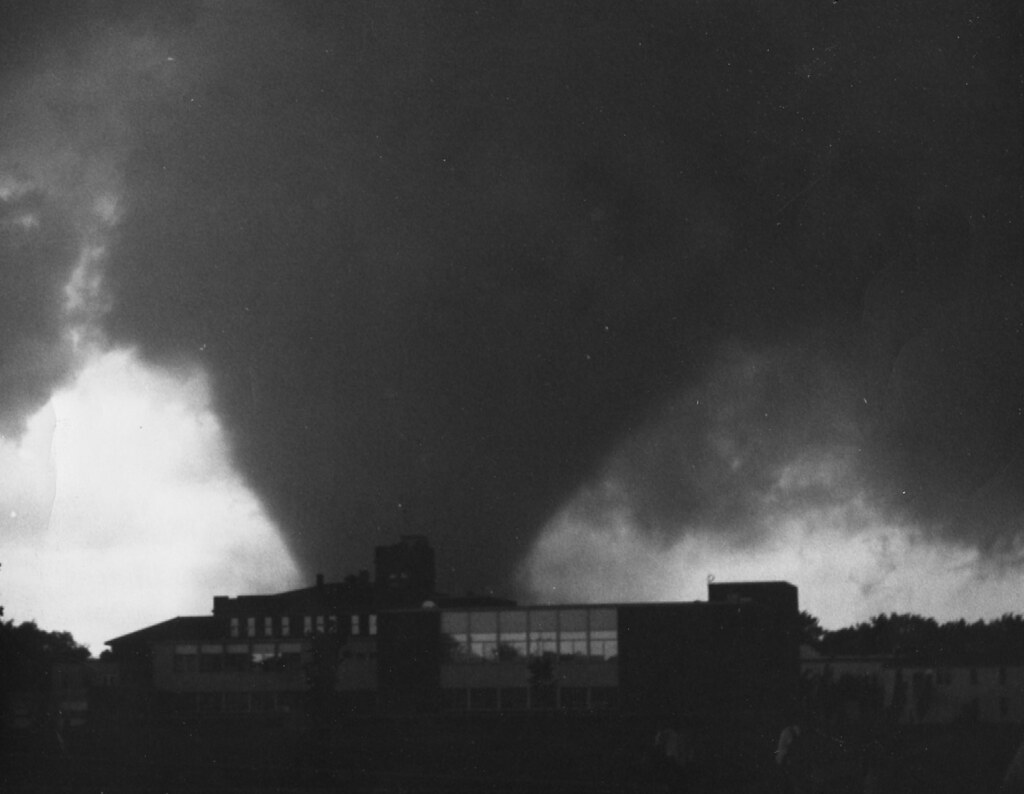
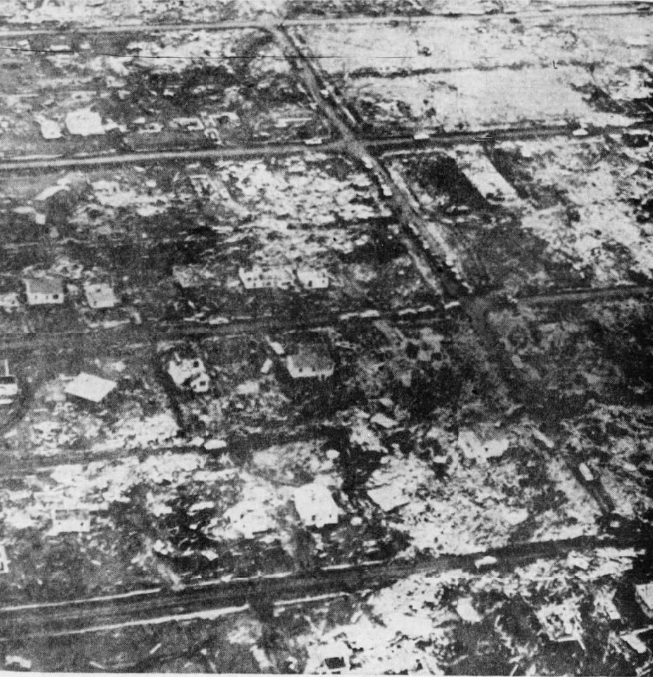
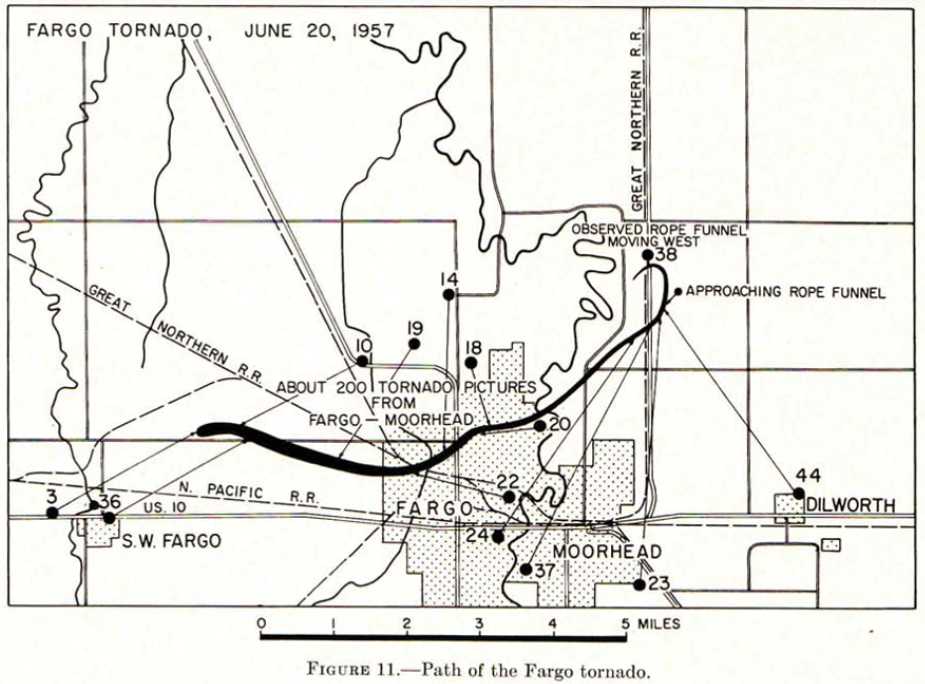
- Clockwise from top: The Fargo tornado photographed from east of the NDAC Memorial Student Union Building; a track map of the Fargo tornado made by Ted Fujita; an aerial view of Golden Ridge after the tornado.

Meteorological history
- Formed: June 20, 1957; 6:40 p.m. CDT (UTC−06:00)
- Dissipated: June 20, 1957; 7:01 p.m. CDT (UTC−06:00)
- Duration: 21 minutes

F5 tornado
- on the Fujita scale
- Max width: 500 yd (460 m)
- Path length: 9 mi (14 km) (Note: Path length of the entire tornado family was 52.4 mi (84.3 km) long)
- Highest winds: >275 mph (443 km/h)

Overall effects
- Fatalities: 12
- Injuries: 103
- Damage: $25.3 million (1957 USD) $288.4 million (2026 USD)
- Areas affected: Cass County, North Dakota, especially Fargo, and Clay County, Minnesota, especially Moorhead
- Part of the Tornadoes of 1957 and the Tornado outbreak sequence of June 20–23, 1957

During the late afternoon and evening hours of June 20, 1957, a long-lived and deadly F5 tornado, commonly known as the Fargo tornado, struck the north side of Fargo, North Dakota, as well as the area north of Moorhead, Minnesota. It was part of a family of five devastating tornadoes produced by the same supercell thunderstorm over the course of 3.5 hours, although in National Weather Service records they are listed as one continuous tornado. The tornado family first developed in North Dakota and traveled 27.4 miles (44.1 km) to the Minnesota border before crossing it and continuing for another 25 miles (40 km), for a total track length of 52.4 miles (84.3 km), with the F5 Fargo tornado itself travelling a track length of approximately 9 miles (14 km). Additionally, at its widest point, the damage swath reached 500 yards (460 m) across.

A total of 12 people were killed, making it the deadliest tornado in North Dakota history; 103 others were injured, and damage was estimated at $25.25 million (equivalent to $289,000,000 in 2025). It was part of a larger outbreak sequence of 23 tornadoes that affected the Midwest and Great Plains. The Fargo tornado was the most recent tornado in North Dakota to be rated F5/EF5 until the Enderlin tornado exactly 68 years later on June 20, 2025.

== Tornado summary ==
The F5 tornado that hit Fargo was the third in the tornado family that moved from Central North Dakota to Central Minnesota, as well as the strongest and most catastrophic. The tornado was sighted as a funnel cloud above Mapleton, North Dakota at 6:25 p.m. on June 20, 1957. It touched down at 7:40 p.m. one mile west of 29th Street North in Fargo and traveled generally northeast for approximately nine miles (14 km), moving directly through the north side of Fargo between 7th Avenue North and 12th Avenue North. It then crossed the Red River into northeastern Moorhead, Minnesota, before occluding northward and dissipating. It had a peak width of 500 yards (460 m) and was on the ground for 21 minutes. At times, it moved as slowly as 10 miles per hour (16 km/h), contributing to its destructiveness. In addition, the communities of Wheatland, North Dakota, Casselton, North Dakota, Glyndon, Minnesota, and Dale, Minnesota were damaged from F0, F2, F4, and F3 tornadoes, respectively. The F0 and F2 tornadoes occurred before the Fargo F5 tornado, while the F4 and F3 tornadoes occurred afterwards, with all of them occurring over a time period of 3.5 hours from 4:40 p.m. to 8:10 p.m. CDT. However, the event is officially listed in NWS and NOAA records as one long-tracked F5 tornado.

Damage was extensive and included 100 blocks of North Fargo. Approximately 329 homes were destroyed, some of them completely swept off their foundations. An additional 1,035 homes were damaged. The worst residential damage occurred in the Golden Ridge Subdivision (today the Madison Elementary School district) near 25th Street North, much of which was swept away and scattered across a nearby farm field. A total of 15 farm homes were destroyed and 25 others damaged. Four churches and three schools, including Shanley High School, Sacred Heart Academy, and buildings on the North Dakota Agricultural College campus were also severely damaged. The tornado also destroyed 15 businesses and 30 others suffered major damage. These were mainly small local shops. A total of 200 automobiles were destroyed and 300 damaged. Some debris from the F5 tornado was found in Becker County, Minnesota, over 50 miles (80 km) east of Fargo.

== Casualties ==
Ten people lost their lives in the immediate aftermath of the storm, making it the deadliest tornado in North Dakota history. Two additional individuals later succumbed to injuries likely sustained during the tornado; however, they were not included in the official fatality count. All of the confirmed victims were residents of the Golden Ridge neighborhood, a predominantly working-class area characterized by modest, economically constructed homes, few of which were equipped with basements. An additional 103 people were injured. Because of the tornado's relatively slow speed, many neighborhood residents fled the area in their cars before the storm hit. The victims of the tornado are as follows:

1-2. Donald Titgen, Betty Titgen.

Donald and Betty Titgen, a married couple, lived in a mobile home at the western edge of Golden Ridge. When the tornado struck, Donald was killed instantly; Betty was seriously injured and remained in a coma until her death in January 1960. Their two young daughters, who had been in the care of an aunt that day, were later raised by relatives.

3-5. Theodore Udahl, Teresa Udahl, Mary Jean Udahl.

Two blocks to the east of the Titgens, Theodore and Teresa Udahl and their eight-year-old daughter Mary Jean were killed when their home was impacted by the tornado. In the confusion afterwards, Theodore and Teresa were mistakenly identified as another couple, while Mary Jean, whose body was found almost a block away from where the Udahl home had stood, was not properly identified until the next day.

6. Laura Schoenherr.

Sixty-nine-year-old Laura Schoenherr, who lived in a mobile home one block east of the Udahls, had been trying to take shelter in her daughter's home next door when the tornado struck. She suffered serious injuries which resulted in the amputation of one of her legs, as well as the loss of function in one arm. She died in the hospital approximately three weeks later on July 15.

7-12. The Munson family

The remaining six fatalities came from a single family. In the summer of 1957, Gerald and Mercedes Munson lived at the far eastern edge of Golden Ridge with their seven children; Phyllis, LeRoy, Darwin, Bradley, Jeanette, Lois Ann and Mary Beth, whose ages at the time were 16, 14, 12, 10, 5, 2, and 16 months respectively. On June 20, Gerald was in Bismarck, North Dakota for his job as a truck driver, while Mercedes was also at her job as a bartender. LeRoy was babysitting for a neighbor while Phyllis was at home with the younger children. That day had also been Mercedes' 36th birthday and she had arranged to leave work early to celebrate her birthday with her children. When Mercedes first heard the storm warnings she called home to check on her children. Phyllis answered the phone, yelling for her mother before the call disconnected.

Mercedes quickly caught a ride across town in an effort to reach her children, only to find her neighborhood in ruins. After finding LeRoy unharmed, a neighbor told her to head for a hospital, which she did along with a friend who gave her a ride. As the evening progressed the two women went back and forth between the city's two main hospitals, St. John's and St. Luke's. Before long, she learned what had happened. Her family's home had been directly in the path of the tornado, and like most homes in the neighborhood, did not have a basement. Phyllis and her five younger siblings had tried to take shelter under a table when the house collapsed upon them. Mercedes first identified Phyllis, Jeanette and Mary Beth in the basement morgue at St. John's hospital, while Lois Ann had been found alive but gravely injured. Meanwhile, at St. Luke's, she identified Bradley in the morgue, and was informed that Darwin had also survived but was also severely injured. Mercedes was not allowed to see either of them. Darwin died from his injuries just before midnight, while Lois Ann died at 2:30 a.m. the following morning. Gerald Munson learned the fate of six of his children the morning after the tornado.

The following morning, news of the deaths of the six Munson children and the disaster made headlines in newspapers across the country. Included in the story of the Munsons was a photograph taken by Fargo Forum photographer Cal Olson, showing 21-year-old Richard Shaw, a neighbor of the Munsons, carrying the body of Jeanette Munson out of the wreckage of their home. The photograph was hailed as symbolizing in raw detail the horror experienced by Fargo in the wake of the tornado, and the following year helped the Forum win a Pulitzer Prize.

== Aftermath and recovery ==
The 1957 Fargo tornado has been identified as the deadliest tornado in North Dakota to date.

After 1971, when Ted Fujita introduced his scale that rates tornadoes based on the damage they cause, the Fargo tornado retrospectively received an F5 rating, the highest level. The Fargo tornado is considered the most devastating in North Dakota history, and is one of only three F5/EF5 tornadoes that have been recorded in the state, the first occurring four years earlier in 1953. In 2025, the third F5/EF5 tornado struck the state near Enderlin. The Fargo area was also hit by F3 tornadoes on June 13, 1950, August 30, 1956, and June 15, 1973, but none of these caused any fatalities. As of 2025, the 1957 Fargo tornado remains one of the northernmost F5/EF5 tornadoes ever recorded in the United States.

An image of the tornado is featured on the cover of the 1984 album Couldn't Stand the Weather by Stevie Ray Vaughan and Double Trouble.

In June 2007, the 50th anniversary of the Fargo tornado was commemorated by the Fargo Forum, which ran a week-long series of stories about the tornado.

In 2010, North Dakota Associate Poet Laureate Jamie Parsley authored a book about the Fargo tornado entitled Fargo, 1957: An Elegy, which was published by the Institute for Regional Studies at North Dakota State University in Fargo.

In 2019, the Cass Act Players performed a musical based on the events of the tornado called Weather the Storm at Bonanzaville Museum in West Fargo.

== See also ==
- List of North American tornadoes and tornado outbreaks
- List of F5, EF5, and IF5 tornadoes
