= Winnipeg Junction, Minnesota =

Ghost town in Minnesota, United States

Coordinates: 46°53′45″N 96°14′48″W

Winnipeg Junction is a ghost town in section 22 of Highland Grove Township in Clay County, Minnesota United States.

== History ==
Winnipeg Junction was established in 1887 when the Northern Pacific Railroad was extended to that point. The town developed rapidly and within twenty years had a church, three stores, three saloons, two restaurants, two hotels, a bakery, a grain elevator, a school, three livery stables, and a post office which operated from 1887 until 1910. In 1909, however, the railroad moved its line to a more favorable grade, and the town subsequently died, its businesses and residents moving to the adjacent communities of Manitoba Junction and Dale. Little trace of the town remains today.
