= EF5 drought =

Lack of EF5 tornadoes in the U.S. (2013–2025)

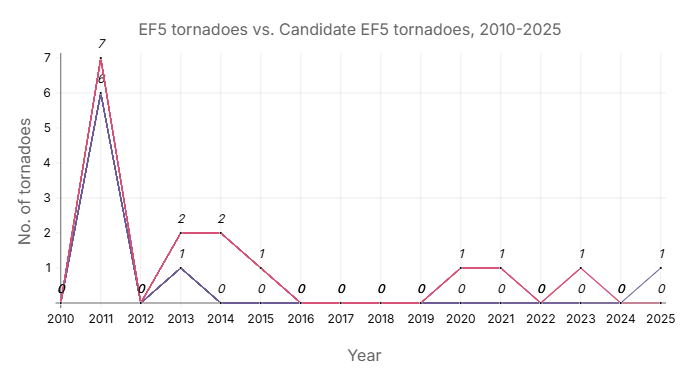
EF5 and "Candidate EF5" tornadoes in the United States from 2010 to 2025 (Note: The spike of EF5 tornadoes during the year 2011 includes the 2011 Smithville tornado, 2011 Rainsville tornado, 2011 Hackleburg-Phil Campbell tornado and 2011 Philadelphia tornado during the 2011 Super Outbreak, and the 2011 Joplin tornado and 2011 El Reno-Piedmont tornado during the Tornado outbreak sequence of May 21–26, 2011.) Official EF5 tornadoes in the United States "Candidate EF5" tornadoes outlined in the 2025 study (Note: Peak winds of the 2013 Shawnee EF4 tornado were revised from 190 miles per hour (310 km/h) to 175 miles per hour (282 km/h) in 2026, excluding it from Candidate EF5 in 2013.)

From 2013 to 2025, the United States alone experienced a record lack of tornadoes rated EF5 on the Enhanced Fujita Scale by the National Weather Service. This period, which has been dubbed the EF5 drought or EF5 gap by some media outlets, was the longest drought of tornadoes rated F5 or EF5 in recorded history. The drought began following the 2013 Moore tornado, occurring on May 20, 2013. Several tornadoes since then had subsequently been rated as high-end EF4 tornadoes, with many of these ratings attracting significant controversy, with notable examples being the 2014 Mayflower–Vilonia tornado, the 2015 Rochelle–Fairdale tornado, the 2021 Western Kentucky tornado, and the 2023 Rolling Fork–Silver City tornado. According to a study in January 2025, the drought had a 0.3% chance of running for as long as it did. The drought ended on June 20, 2025, with the 2025 Enderlin tornado in North Dakota, it had spanned 4,414 days, however, the EF5 rating wasn't implemented until October of that same year.

== Background ==
The Enhanced Fujita (EF) scale is a damage scale that rates tornado intensity based on the severity of the damage they cause. It is used in some countries, including the United States and France. The EF scale is also unofficially used in other countries, including China and Brazil. The rating of a tornado is determined by conducting a tornado damage survey.

== History ==
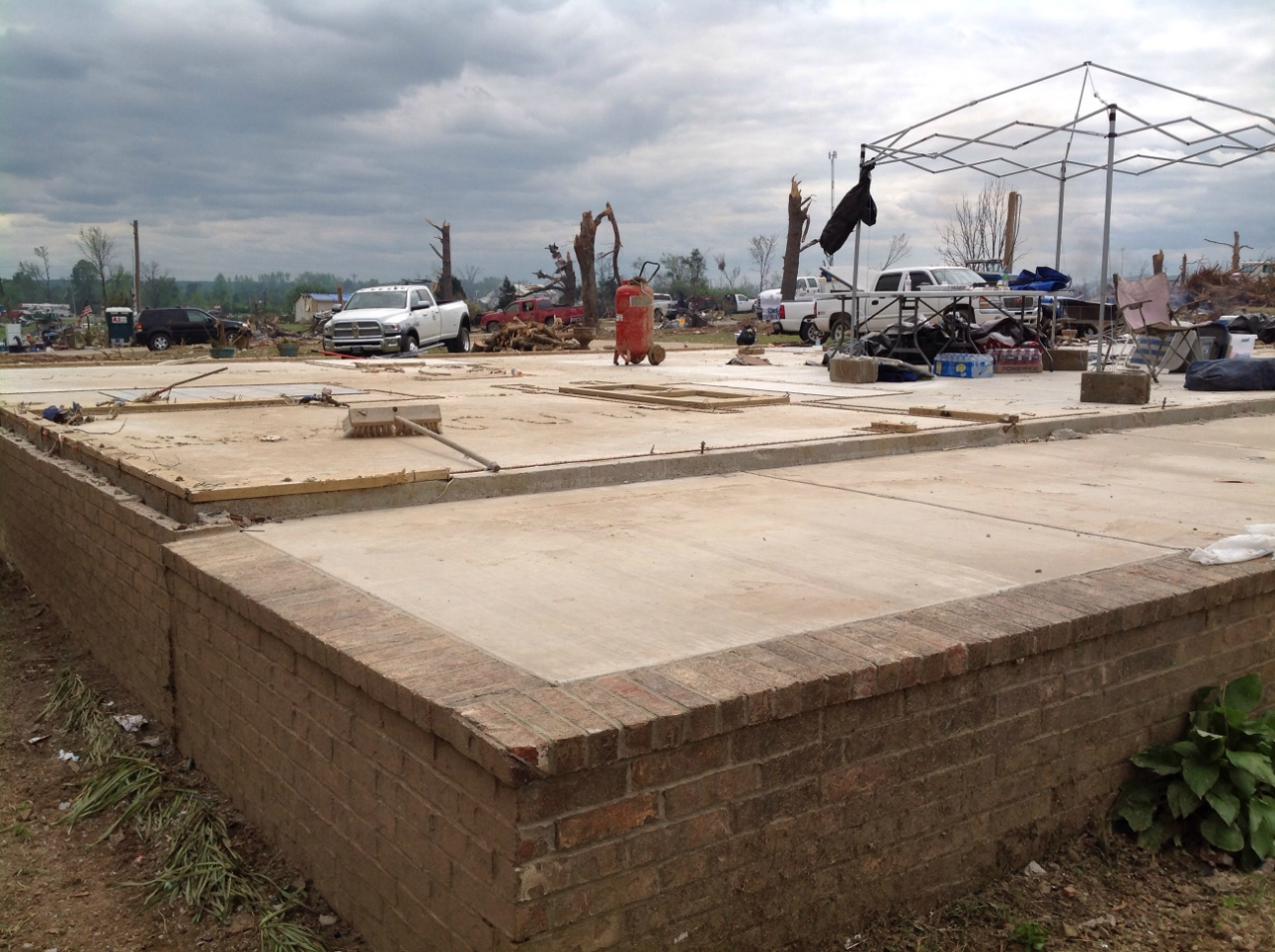
High-end EF4 damage to a home in the Vilonia, Arkansas area. Many people argue that the damage was consistent with an EF5 tornado.

The drought began on May 20, 2013, following the dissipation of the 2013 Moore EF5 tornado. Several tornadoes since the Moore EF5 tornado had reached the greater than 200 miles per hour (320 km/h) wind speeds needed for a tornado to be classified as an EF5, including the 2013 El Reno EF3 tornado and 2015 Rochelle–Fairdale EF4 tornado, with wind speeds measured in excess of 313 miles per hour (504 km/h) and 200 miles per hour (320 km/h), respectively.

The May 31, 2013 El Reno tornado, the widest and one of the most powerful ever recorded, was initially rated as an EF5, although this rating was downgraded to an EF3 later in the year.

The National Weather Service office in Little Rock noted that if the 2014 Mayflower–Vilonia tornado occurred before the change to the Enhanced Fujita Scale in 2007, it likely would have been rated as an F5 due to numerous homes being swept clean from their foundations. However, it was revealed that almost every home in Vilonia lacked anchor bolts and was anchored with cut nails instead. The new scale accounts for homes that use cut nails instead of anchor bolts, which do not effectively provide resistance against violent tornadoes.

The final decision on an EF4 rating was based on this as well. However, meteorologist and civil engineer Timothy P. Marshall noted in his survey of the damage that the rating assigned was "lower bound", and despite the presence of construction flaws, this doesn't rule out "the possibility that EF5 winds could have occurred." Further inspection from surveyors revealed that one home that was swept away along E Wicker Street was indeed properly bolted to its foundation. However, an inspection of the context surrounding the house revealed that small trees in a ditch near the home were still standing, and that the residence had possibly been pummeled by heavy debris from downtown Vilonia, exacerbating the level of destruction.

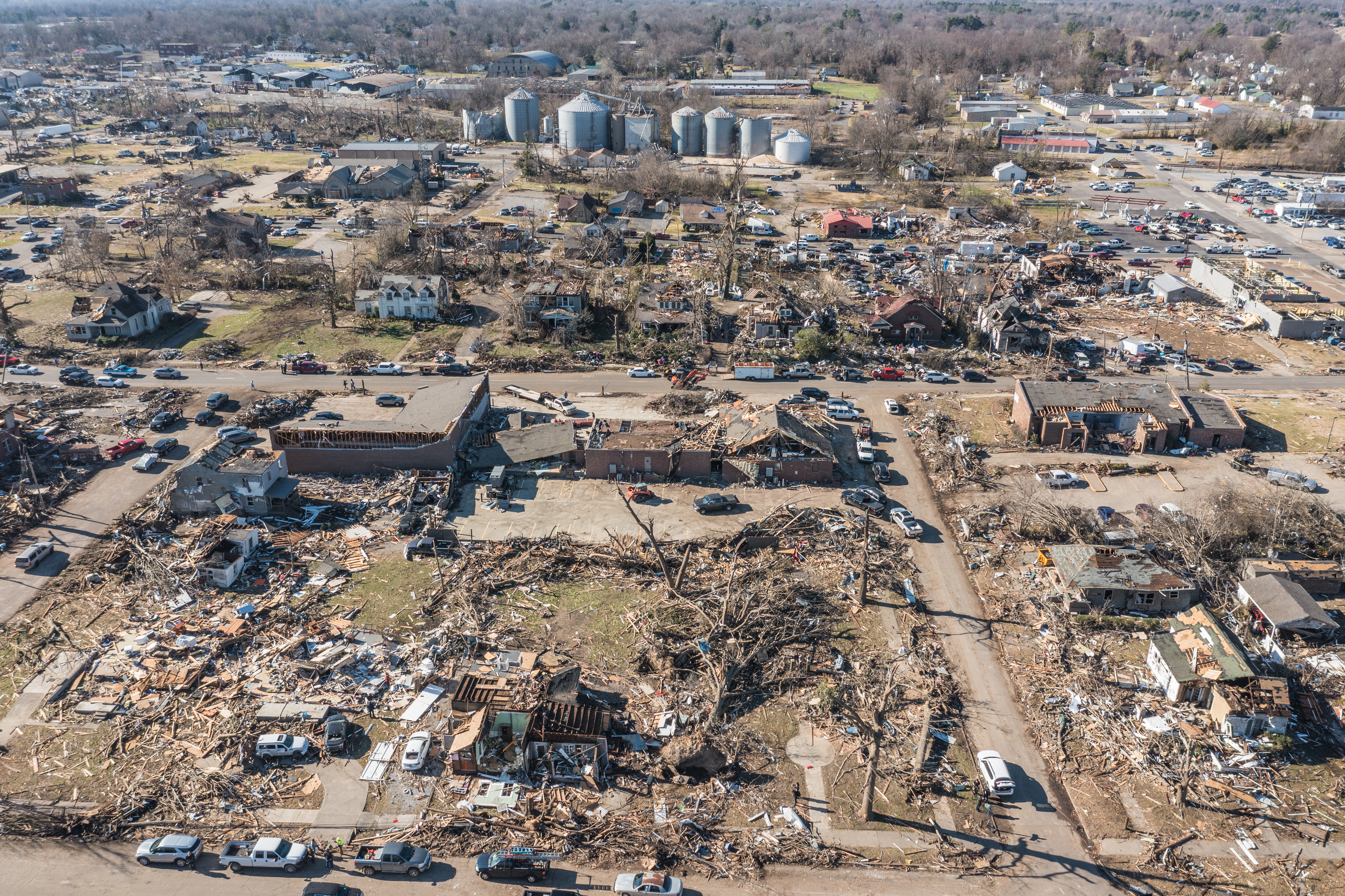
Damage to downtown Mayfield, Kentucky following the 2021 EF4 tornado.

On May 20, 2021, the drought became the longest in history, surpassing the previous drought that spanned from May 1999 to May 2007.

In 2022, Timothy P. Marshall; Zachary B. Wienhoff, both with the Haag Engineering Company; Christine L. Wielgos, a meteorologist at the National Weather Service of Paducah; and Brian E. Smith, a meteorologist at the National Weather Service of Omaha, published a damage survey of portions of the 2021 Western Kentucky EF4 tornado's track, particularly through Mayfield and Dawson Springs. The report noted that "the tornado damage rating might have been higher had more wind resistant structures been encountered. Also, the fast forward speed of the tornado had little 'dwell' time of strong winds over a building and thus, the damage likely would have been more severe if the tornado were slower." Marshall later stated in 2023 that the Western Kentucky tornado was "the closest to EF5 that I can remember" since the 2013 Moore EF5 tornado. Marshall also stated some of the buildings struck by the strongest winds "were horribly constructed and could not resist 100 or even 150 mph wind let alone 200 mph", meaning it was "impossible to know if EF5 winds affected them".

In March 2024, Logan Poole, a meteorologist and damage surveyor with the National Weather Service in Jackson, Mississippi gave an interview regarding the tornado and why the 2023 Rolling Fork–Silver City tornado was rated an EF4 rather than EF5. In the interview, Poole stated:

"So, what gave it the 195 mark? And, the best answer to that is what didn't give it the 200 mark...The Green Apple Florist, essentially a single family home that was modified to built to be a floral shop and it is slabbed to the ground and swept clean. ... Why not EF5? And two things really stuck out to us from the consensus on why not EF5. One was this building, even though it was extremely, extremely destroyed, ... I think most people would agree this would be representative of an EF5 tornado; the damage to that building...If there had even been two of these side-by-side that had suffered the same fate, then maybe we could have had more confidence on that, but we didn't ... What the EF-scale is, is a damage scale...Is it possible that it had winds that were stronger? Certainly."

On April 30, 2024, a large tornado moved through rural farmland near Hollister, Oklahoma. Despite the tornado having an exceptionally strong tornado vortex signature on radar, it was given a rating of EF1. Following the Hollister tornado, meteorologist Eric Graves stated that the "EF scale needed to be amended". The EF4 rating of the May 2024 Greenfield, Iowa tornado that took place less than a month later also attracted significant controversy. A Doppler on Wheels truck determined that wind speeds in excess of 300 miles per hour (480 km/h) could be observed at ground level inside the tornado, which made the tornado one of the strongest ever recorded and would classify it as an EF5. However, damage survey teams only found damage consistent with a high-end EF4 tornado and as a result it was rated as such. In a presentation discussing the findings during the Greenfield event by Joshua Wurman and Karen Kosiba, the two researchers leading the team that observed the tornado, the disconnect between wind speed and ground damage was discussed, with one suggestion stating that aerial wind speeds could be disrupted by housing and other structures at ground level that could have prevented them from producing damage, in addition to the tornado's fast forward speed of 45 miles per hour (72 km/h) that caused the tornado to spend less than one minute in Greenfield.

=== May 2024 study ===
In May 2024, researchers with the University of Western Ontario's Northern Tornado Project and engineering department conducted a case study on the 2018 Alonsa EF4 tornado, the 2020 Scarth EF3 tornado, and the 2023 Didsbury EF4 tornado. In their case study, the researchers assessed extreme damage caused by the tornado which is ineligible for ratings on the Canadian Enhanced Fujita scale or the American Enhanced Fujita scale. In their analysis, it was determined all three tornadoes caused damage well-beyond their assigned ratings, with all three tornadoes having EF5-intensity winds; the Alonsa, Manitoba tornado with 127 metres per second (280 mph; 460 km/h), the Scarth, Manitoba tornado with 110–119 metres per second (250–270 mph; 400–430 km/h), and the Didsbury, Alberta tornado with 119 metres per second (270 mph; 430 km/h). At the end of the analysis, the researchers stated, "the lofting wind speeds given by this model are much higher than the rating based on the ground survey EF-scale assessment. This may be due to the current tendency to bias strong EF5 tornadoes lower than reality, or limitations in conventional EF-scale assessments".

=== January 2025 study ===
A 2025 case study, produced by Anthony Lyza with the National Severe Storms Laboratory and other researchers with the University of Oklahoma's School of Meteorology, published with the American Meteorological Society, found that the probability of no EF5-rated tornadoes happening within an eleven year span would be approximately 0.3%, contrary to the 55.6% of no EF5 tornado happening per year up to 2023. The study asked: "should tornado ratings be more reflective of total impact, and not solely tied to wind speed estimates?" while citing the four EF5 tornadoes during the 2011 Super Outbreak as a reason for inaccurate percentages.

EF4 tornadoes outlined in the 2025 study
Tornado	Max. estimated windspeeds
2011 Cullman–Arab, AL tornado	190 miles per hour (310 km/h)
2011 Pisgah–Higdon, AL tornado	190 miles per hour (310 km/h)
2011 Tuscaloosa–Birmingham, AL tornado	190 miles per hour (310 km/h)
2011 New Harmony, TN tornado	190 miles per hour (310 km/h)
2011 Ringgold, GA/Apison, TN tornado	190 miles per hour (310 km/h)
2011 Chickasha–Blanchard, OK tornado	200 miles per hour (320 km/h)
2011 Goldsby, OK tornado	200 miles per hour (320 km/h)
2013 Washington, IL tornado	190 miles per hour (310 km/h)
2014 Mayflower–Vilonia, AR tornado	190 miles per hour (310 km/h)
2014 Pilger, NE tornado	190 miles per hour (310 km/h)
2015 Rochelle–Fairdale, IL tornado	200 miles per hour (320 km/h)
2020 Bassfield–Soso, MS tornado	190 miles per hour (310 km/h)
2021 Western KY tornado	190 miles per hour (310 km/h)
2023 Rolling Fork–Silver City, MS tornado	195 miles per hour (314 km/h)

=== 2025 Enderlin tornado ===
On June 20, 2025, an extremely violent tornado tore a 12-mile (19 km) track across areas near Enderlin, North Dakota. After an initial rating of EF3, the tornado's official rating was revised to EF5 on October 6, 2025, with winds estimated in excess of 210 miles per hour (340 km/h), with a lower bound wind speed as high as 266 miles per hour (428 km/h) being mentioned, using methodology from the aforementioned Northern Tornadoes Project study. This tornado officially ended the EF5 drought after about 12 years.

== Cause ==
Although there is no official reasoning as to why the drought occurred, there are several generally accepted reasons, including:

- A lack of tornadoes that have reached EF5-level wind speeds
- A lack of well-constructed buildings in areas where tornadoes are most frequent, which are needed for tornadoes to receive an EF5 rating
- Difficulty in finding EF5 Damage Indicators (DIs) due to level of destruction
- Subjectivity in rating of DIs

== See also ==
- Disagreements on the intensity of tornadoes
- Tornado records
