= Manitoba Junction, Minnesota =

Unincorporated community in Minnesota, United States

Manitoba Junction
- Unincorporated community
- Location within Minnesota Location within the United States
- Coordinates: 46°54′24″N 96°14′51″W
- Country: United States
- State: Minnesota
- County: Clay
- Elevation: 1,178 ft (359 m)
- Time zone: UTC-6 (Central (CST))
  - Summer (DST): UTC-5 (CDT)
- Area code: 218
- GNIS feature ID: 654812

Manitoba Junction is an unincorporated community in Highland Grove Township, Clay County, Minnesota, United States. It is named for a railroad junction of the Northern Pacific Railway, where a branch to Winnipeg joined the main line. These tracks are now owned by BNSF Railway.

== Notes ==
Preceding station	Northern Pacific Railway	Following station
Hawley toward Seattle or Tacoma	Main Line	Dale toward St. Paul
Hitterdal toward Winnipeg	Winnipeg – St. Paul	Detroit Lakes toward St. Paul
