= Dale, Minnesota =

Ghost town in Highland Grove Township, Minnesota, US

Coordinates: 46°54′19″N 96°13′11″W

Dale is a ghost town in section 34 of Highland Grove Township in Clay County, Minnesota, United States.

== History ==
The village of Dale was established by Andrew L. Jelsing when he purchased and moved Ole Gol's saloon from Winnipeg Junction. In addition to owning the saloon, Jelsing was also proprietor of a general store, postmaster, and depot agent at the town's rail station. At one time the village had a town hall, a jail, an elevator, and numerous private homes. The post office closed in 1971.

== Transportation ==
Amtrak’s Empire Builder, which operates between Seattle/Portland and Chicago, passes through the ghost town on BNSF tracks, but makes no stop. The nearest station is located in Detroit Lakes, 20 miles (32 km) to the southeast.
