= Jamie Parsley =

American poet

- Born: December 8, 1969 (age 56); Fargo, North Dakota, United States
- Education: Vermont College of Fine Arts (MFA); Nashotah House Seminary (MA)
- Occupations: Poet, Episcopal priest
- Writing career
- Period: 1990s-present

Jamie Parsley (born December 8, 1969) is an American poet and Episcopal priest. He is the author of fifteen books of poems and an associate poet laureate for the state of North Dakota. Parsley is a

== Biography ==
Born in Fargo, North Dakota and raised near Harwood, North Dakota, Parsley received a master of fine arts degree in creative writing from Vermont College at Norwich University. He studied at the School of Theology at Thornloe University in Sudbury, Ontario, St. Joseph’s College, Standish, Maine and received a Master's Degree from Nashotah House Episcopal Seminary, Nashotah, Wisconsin.

Parsley was ordained as an Episcopal priest in 2004, became the priest-in-charge of St. Stephen’s Episcopal Church Fargo in 2008. Parsley began teaching Theology, Ethics, Philosophy, Literature and Writing at the University of Mary's Fargo campus in 2003. Parsley published his first book of poems, Paper Doves, Falling and Other Poems in 1992. Parsley’s book, Cloud, is a book-length poem on the bombing of Hiroshima. Parsley's book of collected haiku, no stars, no moon: new and collected haiku, was published in 2004.

Parsley was appointed an Associate Poet Laureate of North Dakota by Poet Laureate Larry Woiwode in 2004.

Since 2021, Parsley has served as the poet-in-residence at Concordia College in Moorhead, Minnesota.

In 2025, Parsley was elected the president of the North Dakota State Poetry Society.

== Reception ==
Parsley’s tenth book, Fargo, 1957, was published in 2010, and chronicled the stories of the victims and survivors of the tornado that struck Fargo, North Dakota on June 20, 1957 and killed two of his mother's cousins. A reviewer in the High Plains Reader writes that Parsley's shows a "willingness to present himself and his own obsession honestly—the process of discovering these people and what they have left behind."

== Publications ==
- Paper Doves, Falling and Other Poems Sunstone Press, Santa Fe, New Mexico. 1992
- The Loneliness of Blizzards. Mellen Press; Lewiston, New York. 1995. ISBN 9780773400115
- Cloud: a poem in 2 acts; Mellen Press, Lewiston, New York 1997 ISBN 9780773428232
- The Wounded Table Pudding House, Johnstown, Ohio 1999 ISBN 9780944754696
- earth into earth, water into water. Enso Press, Fargo, North Dakota 2000
- no stars, no moon. Mellen Press, Lewiston, New York 2004 ISBN 9780773434875
- Ikon, Enso Press, Fargo, North Dakota 2005.
- Just Once, Loonfeather Press, Bemidji, Minnesota 2007 ISBN 9780926147249
- This Grass. Enso Press, Fargo, North Dakota. 2009 ISBN 9780615333465
- Fargo, 1957. Institute for Regional Studies, North Dakota State University, Fargo, North Dakota. 2010 ISBN 9780911042733
- Crow. Enso Press, Fargo, North Dakota. 2012 ISBN 9780615622804
- That Word. North Star Press, St. Cloud, Minnesota. 2014 ISBN 9780878399857
- The Downstairs Tenant and Other Stories (Institute for Regional Studies, North Dakota State University, 2014) ISBN 9780911042801
- Only Then (Pilgrim Soul Press, Fargo, North Dakota, 2017) ISBN 9780692052907
- Echo (Benevolent Press, Moorhead, Minnesota, 2023) ISBN 9798218274238
- Salt (Kelsay Press, American Fork, Utah, 2024) ISBN 9781639804429
