= Tornado damage survey =

Type of land survey

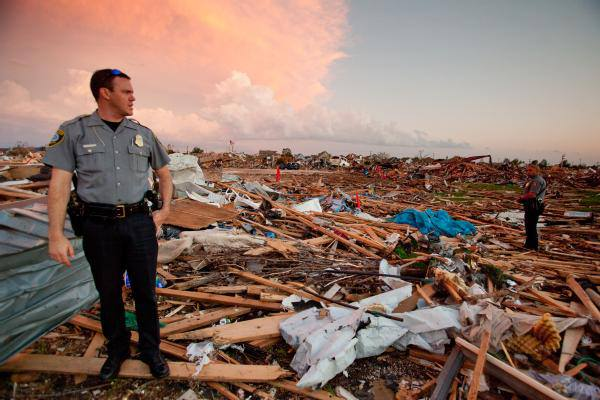
Police officers surveying tornado damage in Moore, Oklahoma following the 2013 Moore tornado

A tornado damage survey, also known as a storm damage assessment, is a type of land survey that is conducted to determine the damage caused by tornadoes, often used to assign a tornado intensity rating. Damage surveys have been used since the 18th century to determine tornado-caused damage, and have become increasingly common following the implementation of the Fujita scale in 1971.

== History ==
Although it is unknown when damage surveys began to be used to determine structural and property damage, one of the earliest known surveys was conducted by German scientist Gottlob Burchard Genzmer in the aftermath of the 1764 Woldegk tornado. Genzmer published a detailed survey of the damage path from the tornado, which documented the 33 km (18.6 mi) long track. The study, known as the "Genzmer Report", was the first to be conducted on a single tornado.

Damage surveys would become more common in the 1960s and 1970s, when Ted Fujita pioneered the Fujita scale, used to determine the strength of tornadoes. Fujita himself had surveyed damage after the atomic bombing of Nagasaki to determine where the bomb had exploded from. Following the Fargo tornado in 1957, Fujita conducted one of the first damage surveys using photographic evidence and ground measurements, using 200 photos to determine the approximate track of the tornado. Following the implementation of the Fujita Scale in 1971, hundreds of post-event damage surveys have been conducted on tornadoes and other weather events to determine the rating of the tornado. In the 2020s, drones have been used to survey hard-to-access areas, most notably following the 2021 Western Kentucky tornado.

== Technology ==
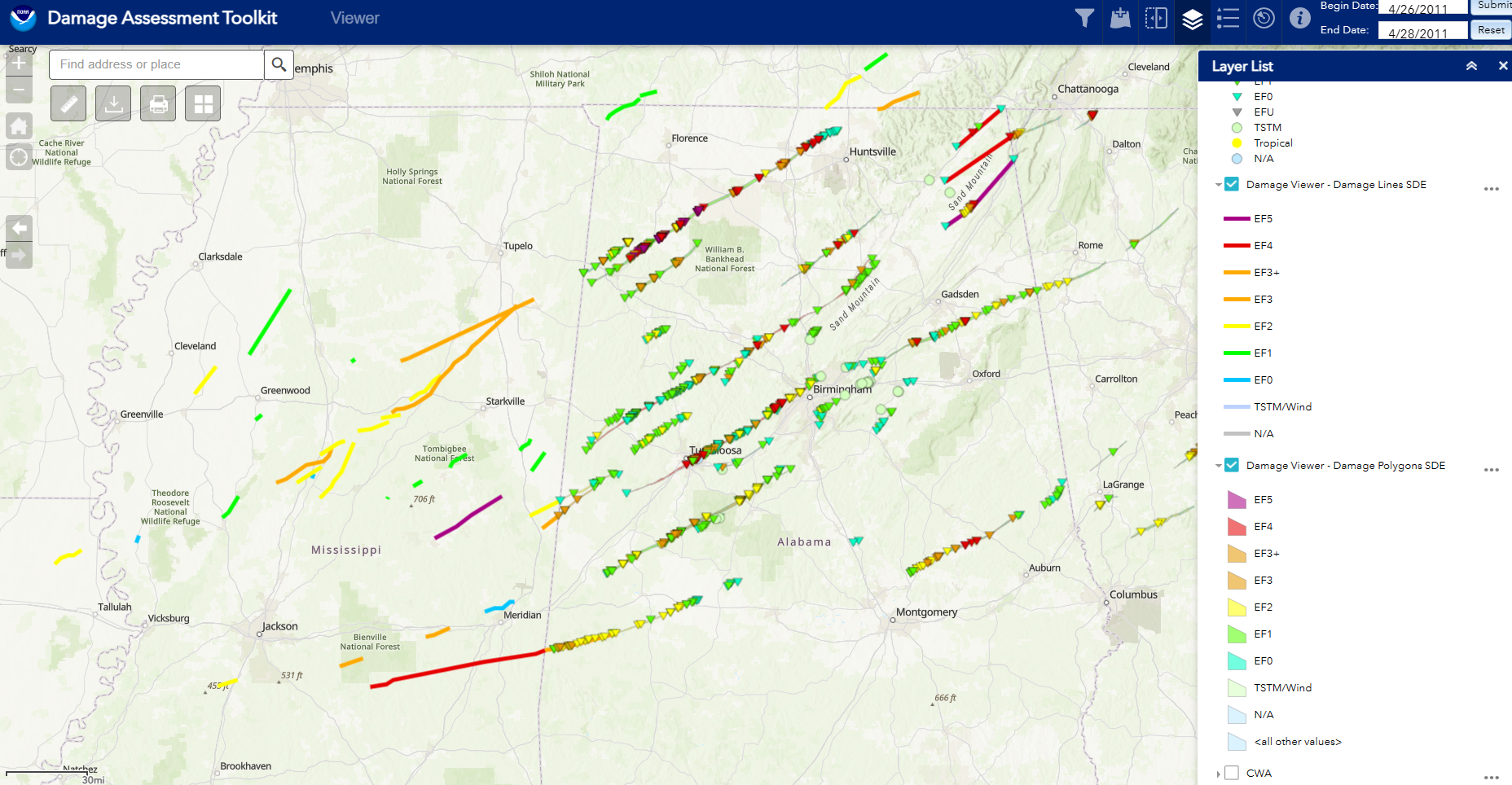
A Damage Assessment Toolkit screenshot of tornado paths during the 2011 Super Outbreak

=== Damage Assessment Toolkit ===
Since 2009, the Damage Assessment Toolkit (DAT), used by the National Weather Service, has been used to publish the preliminary results of damage surveys. An estimated 38,000 individual damage points have been recorded using the software.

== See also ==
- List of case studies on tornadoes (2020–present)
