= Detroit Lakes station =

Amtrak intercity train station in Detroit Lakes, Minnesota

Detroit Lakes, MN
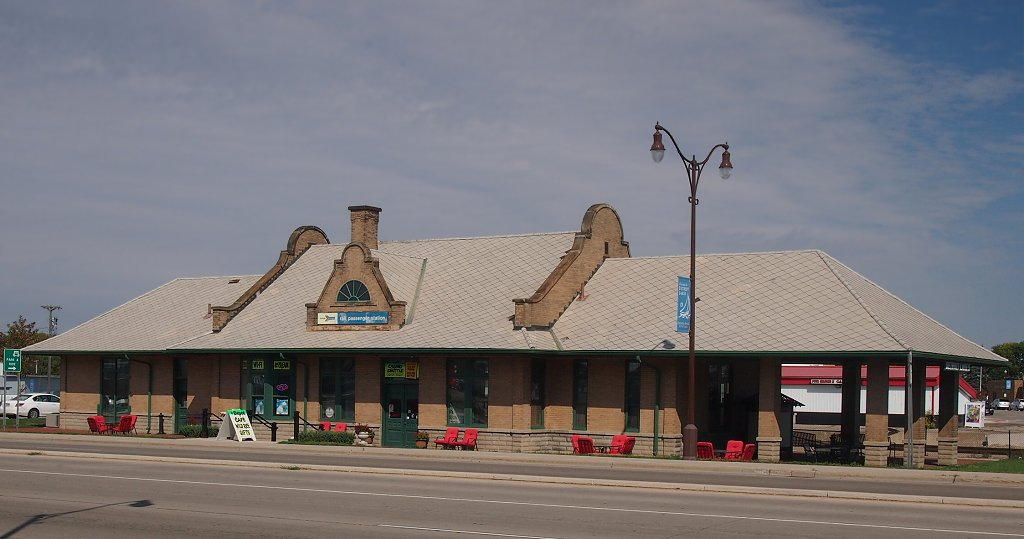
- The Detroit Lakes station from the south

General information
- Location: 116 Pioneer Street; Detroit Lakes, Minnesota; United States
- Coordinates: 46°49′11″N 95°50′45″W
- Line: BNSF Staples Subdivision
- Platforms: 1 side platform
- Tracks: 2

Construction
- Parking: Yes
- Accessible: Yes
- Architect: John Skooglun
- Architectural style: Mission/Spanish Revival

Other information
- Station code: Amtrak: DLK

History
- Opened: 1908

Passengers
- FY 2025: 4,724 (Amtrak)

Services
Preceding station	Amtrak	Following station
Fargo toward Seattle or Portland	Empire Builder	Staples toward Chicago
Former services
Preceding station	Northern Pacific Railway	Following station
Audubon toward Seattle or Tacoma	Main Line	Frazee toward St. Paul
Manitoba Junction toward Winnipeg	Winnipeg – St. Paul	Perham toward St. Paul
- Northern Pacific Passenger Depot
- U.S. National Register of Historic Places
- NRHP reference No.: 88002833
- Added to NRHP: December 20, 1988
Location

Detroit Lakes station is an Amtrak intercity train station in Detroit Lakes, Minnesota, served by Amtrak's daily Empire Builder. The building was originally built by the Northern Pacific Railroad and has been listed on the National Register of Historic Places since 1988 as the Northern Pacific Passenger Depot.

The station was renovated in 2010 under the direction of the local White Earth Reservation and the Minnesota Department of Transportation. The exterior brickwork was cleaned; wood soffits repaired; and window and door trim painted. On the interior, the space was reconfigured to accommodate retail kiosks.

The station is one of three in Minnesota and 78 across the Amtrak network listed in a 2021 settlement with the U.S. Department of Justice over inaccessible facilities under the Americans with Disabilities Act. Under the company's ADA Stations Program (ADASP), new station platforms, walkways, lighting, and other accessibility improvements will be constructed between Amtrak's fiscal year 2025 and 2027.

In 2023, $4 million was included in the Minnesota state budget to study a daytime train service between the Twin Cities and Fargo, North Dakota, a service that would include stops at Detroit Lakes station.
