= National Weather Service Grand Forks, North Dakota =

Weather forecast office of the National Weather Service

National Weather Service Grand Forks is a weather forecast office responsible for monitoring weather conditions for 35 counties in the US states of North Dakota and Minnesota. The office is in charge of weather forecasts, warnings and local statements as well as aviation weather. It is also equipped with a WSR-88D (NEXRAD) radar, and an Automated Surface Observing System (ASOS) that greatly increase the ability to forecast.

== NOAA Weather Radio ==

National Weather Service Grand Fork Forecast Office in Grand Forks, North Dakota provides programming for 17 NOAA Weather Radio stations across Eastern North Dakota and West Central Minnesota.

=== WWF83 Grand Forks ===
WWF83
Grand Forks, North Dakota
- Frequency: 162.475 MHz

Programming
- Language: English
- Format: Weather/Civil Emergency

Technical information
- Power: 300 Watts

Links
- Website: WWF83

WWF83 broadcasts weather and hazard information for Grand Forks County in North Dakota. And Polk County in Minnesota.

=== WXK42 Fargo ===
WXK42
Fargo, North Dakota
- Frequency: 162.475 MHz

Programming
- Language: English
- Format: Weather/Civil Emergency

Technical information
- Power: 1000 Watts

Links
- Website: WXK42

WXK42 broadcasts weather and hazard information for Barnes, Cass, Ransom, Richland, Sargent, Steele & Traill counties in North Dakota. And Clay, Norman & Wilkin counties in Minnesota.

=== KWN44 Cavalier ===
KWN44
Hansel, North Dakota
- Frequency: 162.450 MHz

Programming
- Language: English
- Format: Weather/Civil Emergency

Technical information
- Power: 300 Watts

Links
- Website: KWN44

KWN44 broadcasts weather and hazard information for Pembina County in North Dakota.

=== WXM38 Petersburg ===
WXM38
Dahlen, North Dakota
- Frequency: 162.400 MHz

Programming
- Language: English
- Format: Weather/Civil Emergency

Technical information
- Power: 1000 Watts

Links
- Website: WXM38

WXM38 broadcasts weather and hazard information for Cavalier, Eddy, Grand Forks, Griggs, Nelson, Pembina, Ramsey, Steele & Walsh counties in North Dakota. And Marshall County in Minnesota.

=== KWN43 Langdon ===
KWN43
Langdon, North Dakota
- Frequency: 162.500 MHz

Programming
- Language: English
- Format: Weather/Civil Emergency

Technical information
- Power: 300 Watts

Links
- Website: KWN43

KWN43 broadcasts weather and hazard information for Cavalier County in North Dakota.

=== WNG656 Fort Ransom ===
WNG656
Fort Ransom, North Dakota
- Frequency: 162.525 MHz

Programming
- Language: English
- Format: Weather/Civil Emergency

Technical information
- Power: 1000 Watts

Links
- Website: WNG656

WNG656 broadcasts weather and hazard information for Barnes, Foster, Pierce, Richland, Sargent & Stutsman counties in North Dakota.

=== WXL81 Jamestown ===
WXL81
Ypsilanti, North Dakota
- Frequency: 162.550 MHz

Programming
- Language: English
- Format: Weather/Civil Emergency

Technical information
- Power: 1000 Watts

Links
- Website: WXL81

WXL81 broadcasts weather and hazard information for Barnes, Dickey, Foster, LaMoure, Logan, McIntosh & Stutsman counties in North Dakota.

=== WWG25 Webster ===
WWG25
Devils Lake, North Dakota
- Frequency: 162.425 MHz

Programming
- Language: English
- Format: Weather/Civil Emergency

Technical information
- Power: 300 Watts

Links
- Website: WWG25

WWG25 broadcasts weather and hazard information for Benson, Cavalier, Nelson, Ramsey & Towner counties in North Dakota.

=== KWN46 Sheyenne ===
KWN46
Sheyenne, North Dakota
- Frequency: 162.525 MHz

Programming
- Language: English
- Format: Weather/Civil Emergency

Technical information
- Power: 1000 Watts

Links
- Website: KWN46

KWN46 broadcasts weather and hazard information for Benson, Eddy, Foster, Griggs, Pierce, Ransom, Stutsman & Wells counties in North Dakota.

=== WNG680 Fergus Falls ===
WNG680
Fergus Falls, Minnesota
- Frequency: 162.500 MHz

Programming
- Language: English
- Format: Weather/Civil Emergency

Technical information
- Power: 1000 Watts

Links
- Website: WNG680

WNG680 broadcasts weather and hazard information for Becker, Clay, Grant, Otter Tail & Wilkin counties in Minnesota.

=== WWG98 Park Rapids ===
WWG98
Park Rapids, Minnesota
- Frequency: 162.475 MHz

Programming
- Language: English
- Format: Weather/Civil Emergency

Technical information
- Power: 1000 Watts

Links
- Website: WWG98

WWG98 broadcasts weather and hazard information for Becker, Hubbard & Wadena counties in Minnesota.

=== WWF45 Roosevelt ===
WWF45
Roosevelt, Minnesota
- Frequency: 162.450 MHz

Programming
- Language: English
- Format: Weather/Civil Emergency

Technical information
- Power: 300 Watts

Links
- Website: WWF45

WWF45 broadcasts weather and hazard information for Beltrami, Lake of the Woods & Roseau counties in Minnesota.

=== WNG610 Waubun ===
WNG610
Waubun, Minnesota
- Frequency: 162.450 MHz

Programming
- Language: English
- Format: Weather/Civil Emergency

Technical information
- Power: 300 Watts

Links
- Website: WNG610

WNG610 broadcasts weather and hazard information for Becker, Hubbard, Mahnomen & Norman counties in Minnesota.

=== WXM64 Detroit Lakes ===
WXM64
Detroit Lakes, Minnesota
- Frequency: 162.400 MHz

Programming
- Language: English
- Format: Weather/Civil Emergency

Technical information
- Power: 1000 Watts

Links
- Website: WXM64

WXM64 broadcasts weather and hazard information for Becker, Clay, Hubbard, Mahnomen, Norman, Otter Tail & Wadena counties in Minnesota.

=== WXK43 Thief River Falls ===
WXK43
Thief River Falls, Minnesota
- Frequency: 162.550 MHz

Programming
- Language: English
- Format: Weather/Civil Emergency

Technical information
- Power: 1000 Watts

Links
- Website: WXK43

WXK43 broadcasts weather and hazard information for Beltrami, Clearwater, Kittson, Marshall, Pennington, Polk, Red Lake & Roseau counties in Minnesota.

=== WXM99 Bemidji ===
WXM99
Bemidji, Minnesota
- Frequency: 162.425 MHz

Programming
- Language: English
- Format: Weather/Civil Emergency

Technical information
- Power: 1000 Watts

Links
- Website: WXM99

WXM99 broadcasts weather and hazard information for Beltrami, Northern Cass, Clearwater, Hubbard & Itasca counties in Minnesota.

=== WNG583 Lake Bronson ===
WNG583
Lake Bronson, Minnesota
- Frequency: 162.525 MHz

Programming
- Language: English
- Format: Weather/Civil Emergency

Technical information
- Power: 300 Watts

Links
- Website: WNG583

WNG583 broadcasts weather and hazard information for Kittson & Roseau counties in Minnesota.
