= Root ball =

Mass of roots at the base of a plant

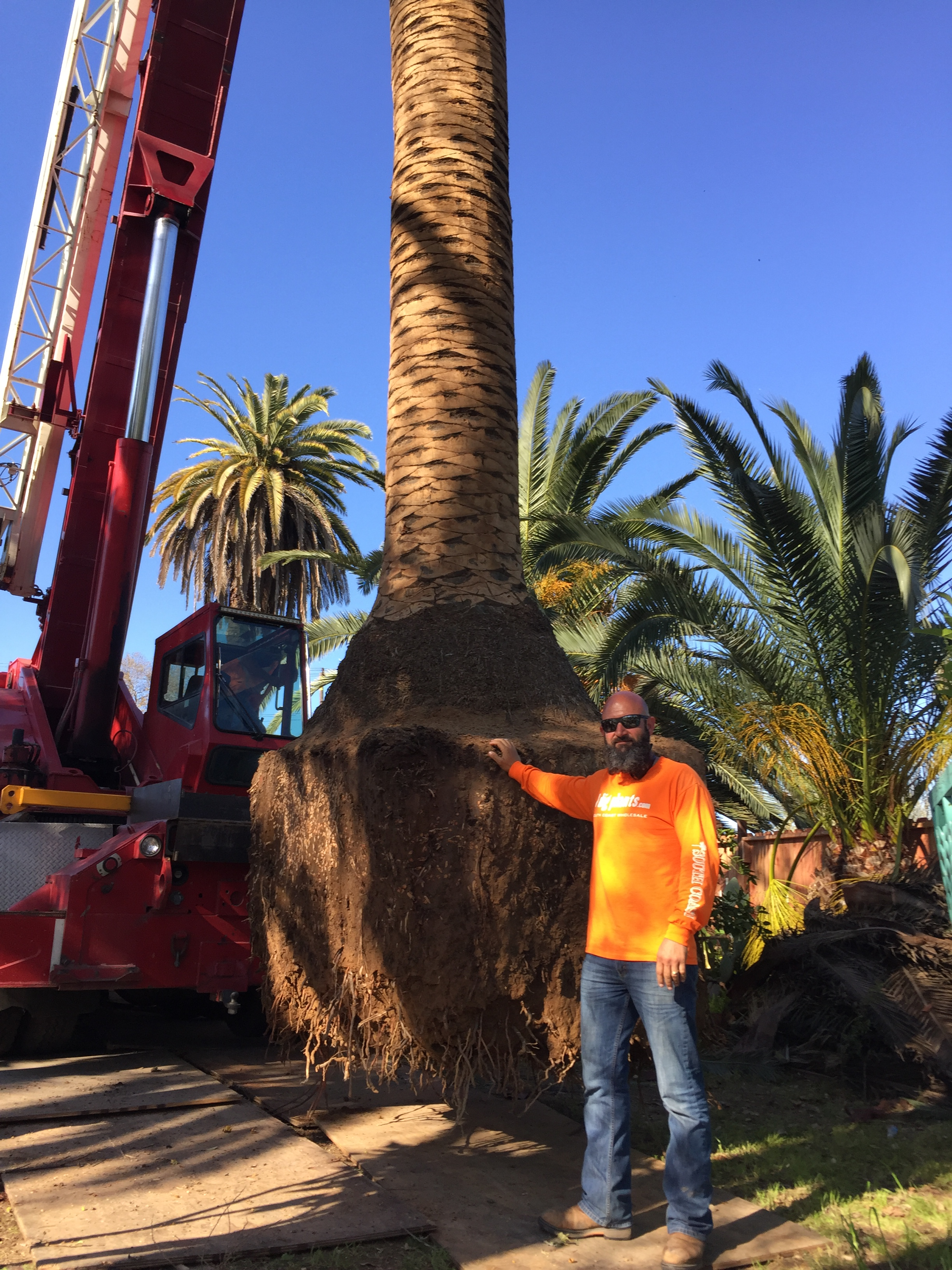
Root ball of a Phoenix canariensis palm tree.

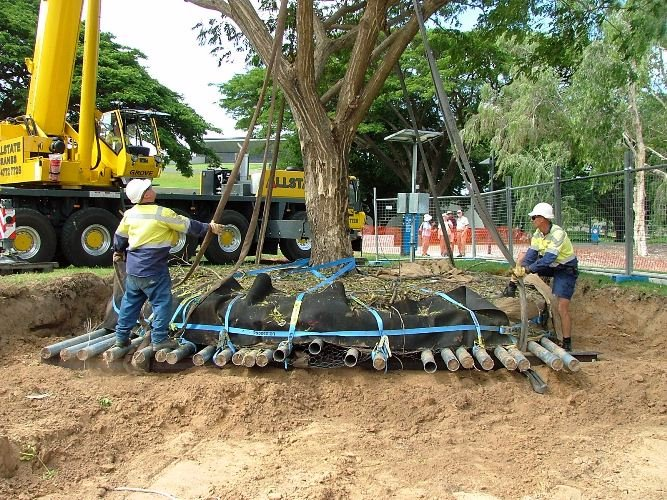
The photo above displays a large rootball ready for transportation in Austria.

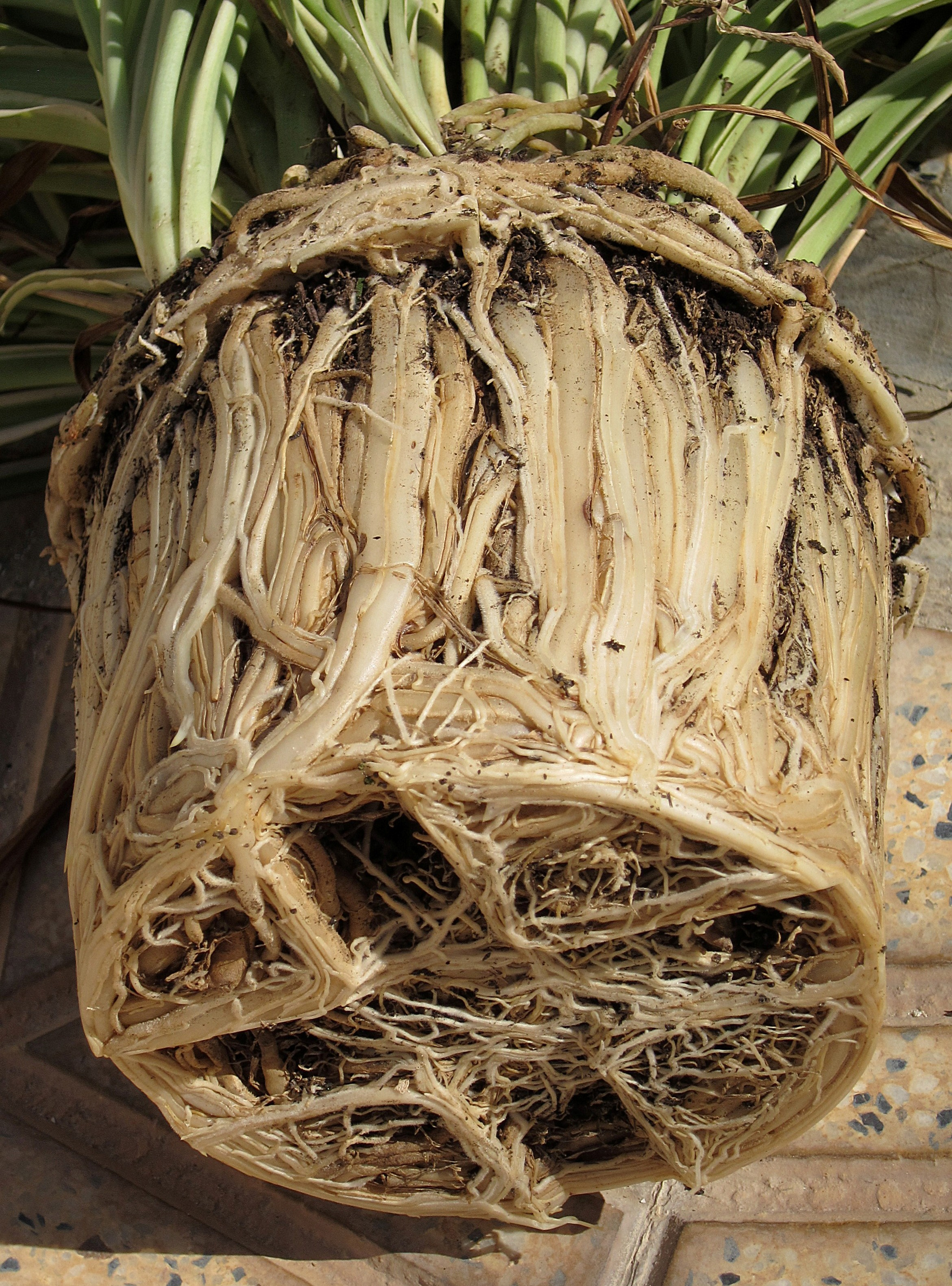
The photo above displays a root bound plant that was grown in a container.

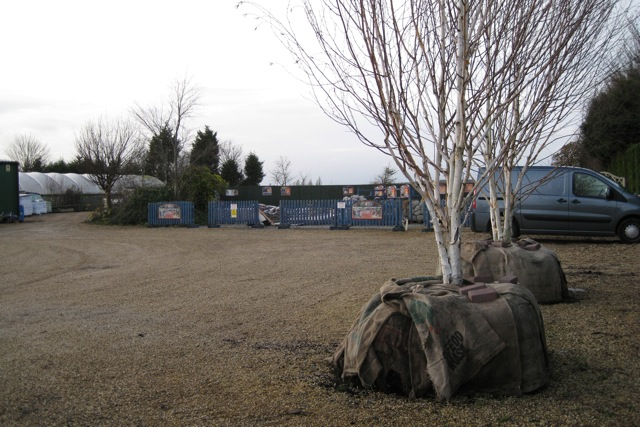
The photo above displays two "ball and bur-lapped" (B&B) trees ready for transportation or planting.

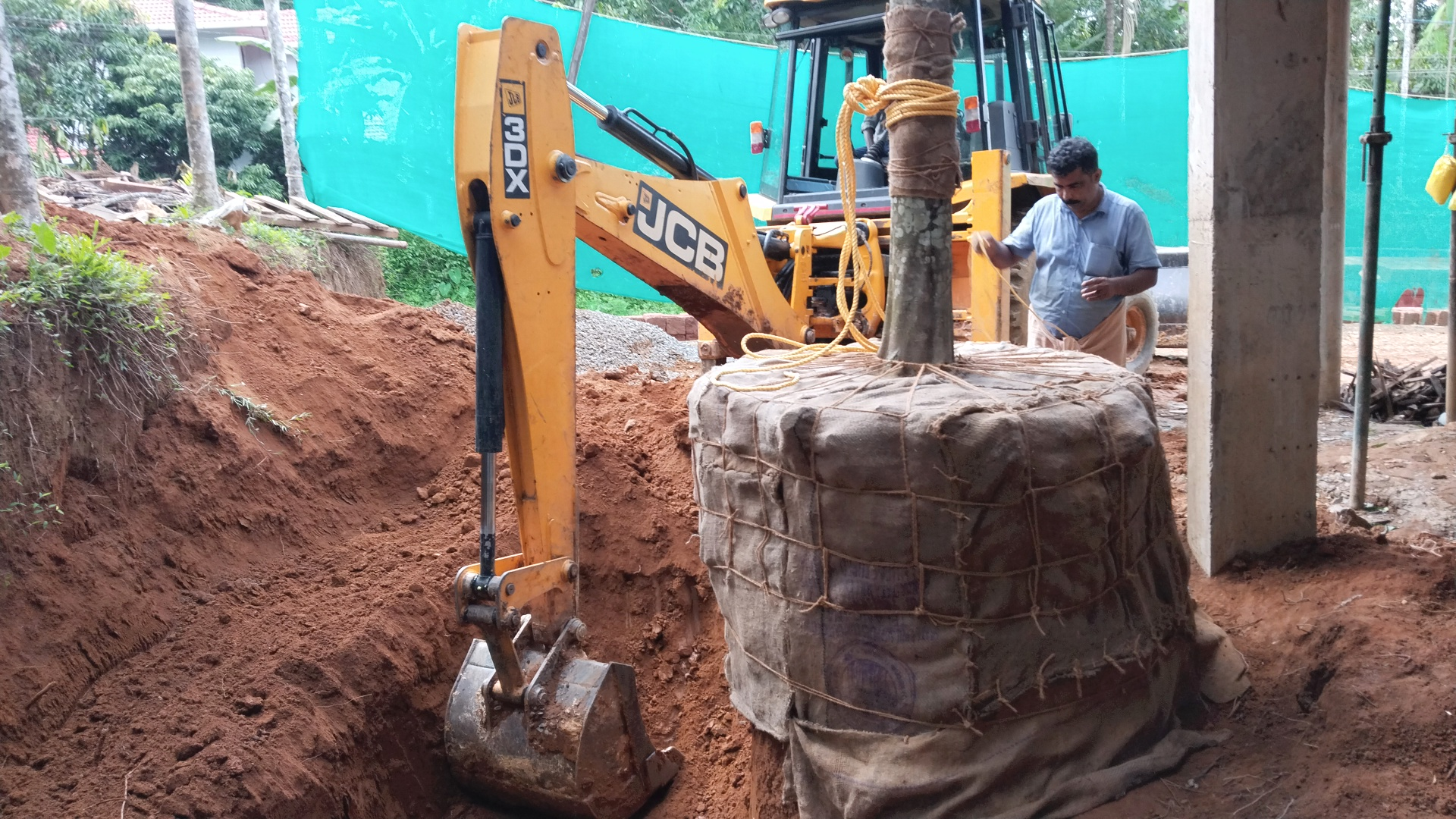
The photo above displays a rootball being excavated.

A root ball is the mass of roots and growing media at the base of a plant such as trees, shrubs, and other perennials and annual plants. The appearance and structure of the root ball will be largely dependent on the method of growing used in the production of the plant. The root ball of a container plant will be different than that of the field-harvested “ball and burlap” tree. The root ball is of particular significance in horticulture when plants are being planted or require repotting as, the quality, size, and preparation of the root ball will heavily determine how well the plant will survive being transplanted and re-establish in its new location.

== Root ball pruning of container grown plants ==
Most commonly, plants are grown in containers where the roots begin to circle and take the shape of their pot. The root balls that have been exposed to this scenario have a very high chance of developing circling or girdling roots that will become problematic and possibly detrimental to the tree or plant's health in the future. To manage this problem, it is best to remove any circling roots where you see them visible. Experts from Clemson University suggest making several slice marks in the root ball from the top to the bottom going 1 to 2 inches deep as this has been found to have positive effects. They have found these cuts cause new regenerative roots to be formed behind the wounds which aid in the plant establishing roots in the new location. The experts from the University of Florida suggest shaving the entire outside of the root ball when it has taken the shape of the pot (otherwise known as rootbound) before planting it into a larger container or its location. They have several supporting studies and images displaying how shaving the outer layer aids in removing circling roots and allows for better root establishment in the new growing area.

== Root balls of field grown plants ==
For larger caliper trees and shrubs after their root balls are harvested from the ground, they are contained using techniques such as ball and burlap or wire baskets. This difference in production style will result in a root ball that is often larger, less sturdy, and less prone to girdling roots than a root ball of a container-grown plant however there is a longer recovery time for these larger plants based on the larger amount of lost root material at the time of harvest.
