= Wheatland, North Dakota =

- CDP
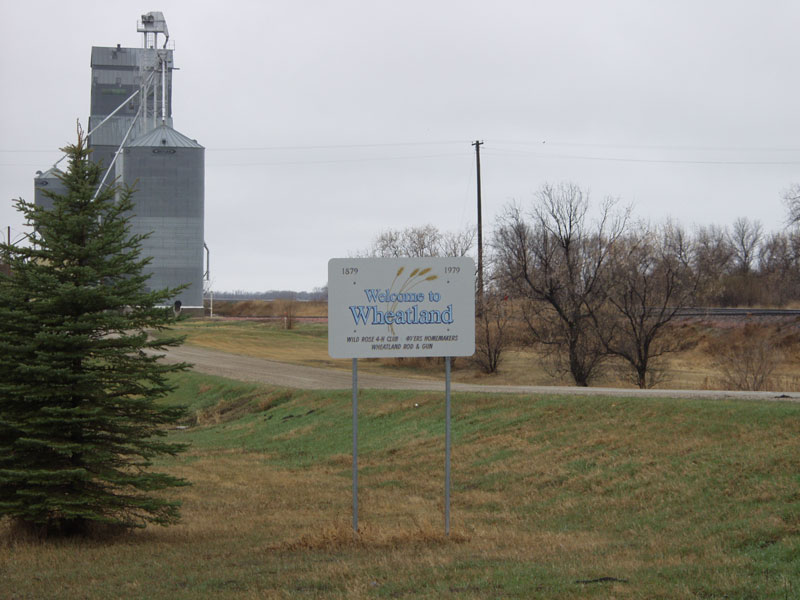
- Wheatland
- Interactive map of Wheatland, North Dakota
- Location within North Dakota
- Coordinates: 46.9049°N 97.3455°W
- Country: United States
- State: North Dakota
- County: Cass
- Township: Wheatland
- Established: 1872
- Platted: November 1878
- Named after: The Fertile Wheat Fields

Area
  - Total: 4.012 sq mi (10.391 km^{2})
  - Land: 4.012 sq mi (10.391 km^{2})
  - Water: 0 sq mi (0.000 km^{2}) 0.00%
- Elevation: 991 ft (302 m)

Population (2020)
  - Total: 92
  - Estimate (2025): 44
  - Density: 23/sq mi (8.9/km^{2})
- Time zone: UTC–6 (Central (CST))
  - Summer (DST): UTC–5 (CDT)
- ZIP Code: 58079
- Area code: 701
- FIPS code: 38-85180
- GNIS feature ID: 2393848
- Highways: CR 5, CR 10

Wheatland is a census-designated place (CDP) in Cass County, North Dakota, United States. The population was 92 as of the 2020 census, and was estimated at 44 in 2025.

== History ==
There was a post office in Wheatland, opening on May 6, 1878, with William D. Murray (whose name graces an addition to the town and one of the streets) although it has been closed for well over a decade as of 2026. The community was named for the wheat field near the original town site.

== Geography ==
According to the United States Census Bureau, the CDP has a total area of 4.012 square miles (10.39 km^{2}), all land.

== Demographics ==
Historical population
Census	Pop.	Note	%±
2000	60		—
2010	68		13.3%
2020	92		35.3%
2025 (est.)	44		−52.2%
U.S. Decennial Census; 2020 Census

As of the 2024 American Community Survey, there were 31 estimated households in Wheatland with an average of 2.26 persons per household. The CDP has a median household income of $0. Approximately 0.0% of the CDP's population lives at or below the poverty line. Wheatland has an estimated 27.1% employment rate, with 45.7% of the population holding a bachelor's degree or higher and 87.1% holding a high school diploma. There were 60 housing units at an average density of 14.96 per square mile (5.8/km^{2}).

The top five reported languages (people were allowed to report up to two languages, thus the figures will generally add to more than 100%) were English (100.0%), Spanish (0.0%), Indo-European (0.0%), Asian and Pacific Islander (0.0%), and Other (0.0%).

The median age in the CDP was 69.1 years.

Wheatland, North Dakota – racial and ethnic composition Note: the US Census treats Hispanic/Latino as an ethnic category. This table excludes Latinos from the racial categories and assigns them to a separate category. Hispanics/Latinos may be of any race.
Race / ethnicity (NH = non-Hispanic)	Pop. 2000	Pop. 2010	Pop. 2020	% 2000	% 2010	% 2020
White alone (NH)	60	67	83	100.00%	98.53%	90.22%
Black or African American alone (NH)	0	0	0	0.00%	0.00%	0.00%
Native American or Alaska Native alone (NH)	0	1	0	0.00%	1.47%	0.00%
Asian alone (NH)	0	0	0	0.00%	0.00%	0.00%
Pacific Islander alone (NH)	0	0	0	0.00%	0.00%	0.00%
Other race alone (NH)	0	0	1	0.00%	0.00%	1.09%
Mixed race or multiracial (NH)	0	0	2	0.00%	0.00%	2.17%
Hispanic or Latino (any race)	0	0	6	0.00%	0.00%	6.52%
Total	60	68	92	100.00%	100.00%	100.00%

=== 2020 census ===
As of the 2020 census, there were 92 people, 36 households, and 30 families residing in the CDP. The population density was 22.93 inhabitants per square mile (8.9/km^{2}). There were 36 housing units at an average density of 8.97 per square mile (3.5/km^{2}). The racial makeup of the CDP was 94.57% White, 0.00% African American, 1.09% Native American, 0.00% Asian, 0.00% Pacific Islander, 1.09% from some other races and 3.26% from two or more races. Hispanic or Latino people of any race were 6.52% of the population.

=== 2010 census ===
As of the 2010 census, there were 68 people, 30 households, and 21 families residing in the CDP. The population density was 16.95 inhabitants per square mile (6.5/km^{2}). There were 33 housing units at an average density of 8.23 per square mile (3.2/km^{2}). The racial makeup of the CDP was 98.53% White and 1.47% Native American.

=== 2000 census ===
As of the 2000 census, there were 60 people, 22 households, and 17 families residing in the CDP. The population density was 15.02 inhabitants per square mile (5.8/km^{2}). There were 28 housing units at an average density of 7.01 per square mile (2.7/km^{2}). The racial makeup of the CDP was 100.00% White.

There were 22 households, out of 45.5% had children under the age of 18 living with them, 68.2% were married couples living together, 13.6% had a female householder with no husband present, and 18.2% were non-families. 18.2% of all households were made up of individuals, and 4.5% had someone living alone who was 65 years of age or older. The average household size was 2.73 and the average family size was 3.11.

In the CDP, the population was spread out, with 33.3% under the age of 18, 8.3% from 18 to 24, 21.7% from 25 to 44, 28.3% from 45 to 64, and 8.3% who were 65 years of age or older. The median age was 36 years. For every 100 females, there were 122.2 males. For every 100 females age 18 and over, there were 100.0 males.

The median income for a household in the CDP was $37,083, and the median income for a family was $55,625. Males had a median income of $35,000 versus $14,000 for females. The per capita income for the CDP was $16,084. None of the population and none of the families were below the poverty line.
