= Highland Grove Township, Clay County, Minnesota =

Township in Minnesota, United States

Highland Grove Township
- Township
- Location of Highland Grove Township, within Clay County, Minnesota

- Location within the state of Minnesota Highland Grove Township (the United States)
- Coordinates: 46°55′28″N 96°14′34″W
- Country: United States
- State: Minnesota
- County: Clay

Area
  - Total: 35.0 sq mi (90.6 km^{2})
  - Land: 34.3 sq mi (88.9 km^{2})
  - Water: 0.62 sq mi (1.6 km^{2})
- Elevation: 1,224 ft (373 m)

Population (2020)
  - Total: 274
  - Density: 7.98/sq mi (3.08/km^{2})
- Time zone: UTC-6 (Central (CST))
  - Summer (DST): UTC-5 (CDT)
- FIPS code: 27-28988
- GNIS feature ID: 0664470

Highland Grove Township is a township in Clay County, Minnesota, United States. The population was 274 at the 2020 census.

== History ==
Highland Grove Township was named from its lakeside groves and its lofty elevation above the Red River valley.

== Geography ==
According to the United States Census Bureau, the township has a total area of 35.0 square miles (91 km^{2}), of which 34.3 square miles (89 km^{2}) is land and 0.6 square miles (1.6 km^{2}) (1.77%) is water.

== Demographics ==
As of the census of 2000, there were 304 people, 104 households, and 91 families residing in the township. The population density was 8.9 inhabitants per square mile (3.4/km^{2}). There were 112 housing units at an average density of 3.3 per square mile (1.3/km^{2}). The racial makeup of the township was 98.36% White, 0.66% Native American, and 0.99% from two or more races. Hispanic or Latino of any race were 0.33% of the population.

There were 104 households, out of which 45.2% had children under the age of 18 living with them, 76.0% were married couples living together, 7.7% had a female householder with no husband present, and 12.5% were non-families. 11.5% of all households were made up of individuals, and 3.8% had someone living alone who was 65 years of age or older. The average household size was 2.92 and the average family size was 3.15.

In the township the population was spread out, with 30.6% under the age of 18, 6.6% from 18 to 24, 28.3% from 25 to 44, 23.7% from 45 to 64, and 10.9% who were 65 years of age or older. The median age was 36 years. For every 100 females, there were 100.0 males. For every 100 females age 18 and over, there were 101.0 males.

The median income for a household in the township was $42,917, and the median income for a family was $48,750. Males had a median income of $31,875 versus $25,192 for females. The per capita income for the township was $15,339. About 5.3% of families and 10.8% of the population were below the poverty line, including 15.8% of those under the age of eighteen and 9.1% of those 65 or over.
