= List of tornadoes in the outbreak and derecho of June 19–22, 2025 =

From June 19 to 22, 2025, a significant tornado outbreak and derecho affected the Northern Plains, spawning 40 tornadoes, including the first EF5 tornado in 12 years.

== Confirmed tornadoes ==
Confirmed tornadoes by Enhanced Fujita rating
EFU	EF0	EF1	EF2	EF3	EF4	EF5	Total
5	14	13	6	1	0	1	40

=== June 19 event ===
List of confirmed tornadoes – Thursday, June 19, 2025 (Note: All dates are based on the local time zone where the tornado touched down; however, all times are in Coordinated Universal Time for consistency.)
EF#	Location	County / parish	State / Province	Start coord.	Time (UTC)	Path length	Max. width
EF0	S of Hirsch	Coalfields	SK	49.14°N 102.59°W	22:23	Unknown	Unknown
EF0	A brief tornado was recorded, causing no reported damage.						
EF0	S of Frobisher (1st tornado)	Coalfields	SK	49.1364°N 102.4524°W	22:40	Unknown	Unknown
EF0	A weak tornado caused minor tree damage.						
EF2	S of Frobisher (2nd tornado)	Coalfields	SK	49.1325°N 102.4179°W	22:45	12.5 km (7.8 mi)	650 m (710 yd)
EF2	A strong tornado damaged power poles, oil tanks, grain bins, and trees.						
EF2	E of Kronau (1st tornado)	Lajord	SK	50.3185°N 104.2235°W	23:04	9.46 km (5.88 mi)	680 m (740 yd)
EF2	This tornado damaged a well-constructed home, many farm vehicles, and vegetation in a rural area.						
EF0	E of Kronau (2nd tornado)	Lajord	SK	50.315°N 104.170°W	23:10	Unknown	Unknown
EF0	The same storm produced a second, weaker tornado which damaged vegetation and a grain bin.						
EF1	Blackstrap Lake	Dundurn	SK	51.8386°N 106.3793°W	23:25	4.25 km (2.64 mi)	210 m (230 yd)
EF1	Two residences near the northeastern shore of the lake were damaged by this tornado.						
EF0	S of Vibank	Francis	SK	50.28°N 103.94°W	23:51	Unknown	Unknown
EF0	A tornado was recorded, causing no reported damage.						
EF0	NE of Young	Morris	SK	51.80°N 105.64°W	00:18	Unknown	Unknown
EF0	A tornado was recorded, causing no reported damage.						
EF1	SW of Dickinson	Stark	ND	46.77°N 102.91°W	00:22–00:24	1.38 mi (2.22 km)	200 yd (180 m)
EF1	A tornado caused damage along a short path, partially tearing the roofs off two houses and snapping a large branch from a tree. Additional impacts included downed fencing, ripped siding, and two power poles knocked over near the southern end of the damage track.						
EF1	N of Dysart	Touchwood	SK	51.1400°N 104.1156°W	02:10	5.30 km (3.29 mi)	220 m (240 yd)
EF1	A tornado caused damage to trees and a shed, additionally causing minor shingle damage to a roof near South Touchwood.						
EF1	S of Hubbard	Ituna Bon Accord	SK	51.0960°N 103.4340°W	03:00	11.3 km (7.0 mi)	890 m (970 yd)
EF1	This tornado damaged trees, a rural home and farm buildings, and an RV.						
EF0	E of Hillside Colony	Spink	SD	44.74°N 97.98°W	03:50	0.01 mi (0.016 km)	10 yd (9.1 m)
EF0	A storm chaser spotted a brief, weak tornado. No damage was noted.						

=== June 20 event ===
List of confirmed tornadoes – Friday, June 20, 2025
EF#	Location	County / parish	State	Start coord.	Time (UTC)	Path length	Max. width
EFU	SSW of Spiritwood	Stutsman	ND	46.8987°N 98.5786°W	01:34–01:38	1.14 mi (1.83 km)	50 yd (46 m)
EFU	A brief tornado occurred, causing no damage.						
EFU	NNW of New Salem	Morton	ND	46.9163°N 101.4902°W	01:40–01:41	0.5 mi (0.80 km)	50 yd (46 m)
EFU	This tornado occurred in an open field and impacted no structures.						
EF2	NE of New Salem to SSE of Center	Morton	ND	46.9486°N 101.3247°W	01:48–01:59	5.62 mi (9.04 km)	200 yd (180 m)
EF2	This tornado damaged three farmsteads after tracking east-northeast from New Salem. The first farmstead had minimal damage. Two separate farm buildings on the second farm lost their roofs and a grain bin was severely damaged. The third farmstead had a damaged roof to the main house as well as one of the farm buildings. A mile of power poles were broken or leaned over in between the second and third farms. A wind turbine was also snapped and toppled near the bottom of the support pole.						
EF3	E of Spiritwood	Stutsman, Barnes	ND	46.9234°N 98.4587°W	01:51–02:20	10.94 mi (17.61 km)	990 yd (910 m)
EF3	See section on this tornado.						
EF1	NW of Dickey	LaMoure	ND	46.6058°N 98.5628°W	02:05–02:07	0.23 mi (0.37 km)	150 yd (140 m)
EF1	Two farm buildings were damaged and significant tree damage was noted near the touchdown of the tornado. Two ice fishing houses were also damaged and a grain cart with 120 bushels of corn was tossed end over end.						
EF0	SSW of Sanborn	Barnes	ND	46.8808°N 98.2701°W	02:05–02:23	1.05 mi (1.69 km)	20 yd (18 m)
EF0	An anticyclonic tornado caused no damage over open land.						
EFU	NE of Sanger	McLean	ND	47.2492°N 100.9304°W	02:26–02:27	0.35 mi (0.56 km)	50 yd (46 m)
EFU	A brief tornado occurred in an open field causing no known damage.						
EF2	SW of Valley City	Barnes	ND	46.8915°N 98.102°W	02:29–02:50	5.79 mi (9.32 km)	400 yd (370 m)
EF2	This strong tornado initially caused tree damage with large broken branches before intensifying near several homes. Two homes sustained minor shingle, roof, and siding damage, while one had a collapsed garage and partial porch roof loss. After crossing a ridge near the Sheyenne River, the tornado caused widespread tree damage and struck up to four more homes south of Valley City. One home suffered the most severe damage, with collapsed exterior top-floor walls, total roof destruction, and the complete collapse of a garage. A nearby carport and shed were also partially collapsed. Another home had roof and siding damage with one exterior wall pushed inward. Additional nearby homes experienced window, siding, and shingle damage. Tree damage continued in the area with numerous fallen branches before the tornado lifted.						
EF1	NE of Tappen to NNW of Medina	Kidder, Stutsman	ND	46.9405°N 99.5678°W	03:07–03:19	12.51 mi (20.13 km)	200 yd (180 m)
EF1	A QLCS tornado tracked east-northeast, snapping numerous trees down to the trunk, stripping them of leaves and branches. Power transmission towers were bent and twisted. One farm building sustained roof damage while another was completely destroyed. Several homes experienced shingle, siding, garage, and roof damage with debris scattered across properties and found up to half a mile away. Grain bins were dented and a semi trailer was tipped onto its side.						
EFU	W of Fort Ransom	LaMoure	ND	46.525°N 98.11°W	03:10–03:11	0.48 mi (0.77 km)	50 yd (46 m)
EFU	A tornado was photographed and posted on social media. No known damage occurred.						
EF2	NW of Fort Ransom	Ransom	ND	46.5399°N 98.0302°W	03:20–03:29	5.2 mi (8.4 km)	400 yd (370 m)
EF2	The tornado began by damaging three power poles as it tracked northeast. Around the same time, the tornado picked up multiple pieces of large farm machinery, carrying them for up to a half mile. Turning back northwest, it struck a farmhouse and a grove of trees, causing low-end EF2 damage. As it weakened and roped out, it damaged another power pole northwest of the farmstead before dissipating.						
EFU	NNW of Fort Ransom	Ransom	ND	46.574°N 97.945°W	03:22–03:25	0.6 mi (0.97 km)	50 yd (46 m)
EFU	A satellite tornado to the Fort Ransom EF2 left notable scarring through a field on high-resolution satellite imagery.						
EF0	SW of Hunter to SW of Grandin	Cass	ND	47.1506°N 97.2602°W	03:36–03:44	8.56 mi (13.78 km)	100 yd (91 m)
EF0	Several trees were damaged in shelterbelts and ground scouring was noted.						
EF1	N of Hunter	Cass	ND	47.1904°N 97.2601°W	03:38–03:44	5.82 mi (9.37 km)	300 yd (270 m)
EF1	Multiple trees were damaged.						
EF1	ESE of Arthur to E of Gardner	Cass	ND	47.0889°N 97.1229°W	03:41–03:51	12.17 mi (19.59 km)	800 yd (730 m)
EF1	Several shelterbelts and bean fields sustained damage and a farmstead lost several grain bins, a shed and a machine shop while the house on the property sustained roof damage.						
EF1	NNE of Bordulac to SW of Grace City	Foster	ND	47.4823°N 98.921°W	03:44–03:51	5.79 mi (9.32 km)	150 yd (140 m)
EF1	This tornado touched downand traveled northeast, severely damaging a farmstead at the start of its path. A barn lost its entire upper wooden and sheet-metal section, a silo had its top torn off, and multiple barns lost roofs and doors. The tornado crossed open fields before hitting another farmstead, where many trees were broken and large branches were twisted off, including one driven into a camper. Nearby, power lines were brought down and part of a large shop building housing equipment was torn away before the tornado lifted.						
EF5	E of Enderlin	Ransom, Cass	ND	46.5728°N 97.6031°W	04:04–04:20	12.1 mi (19.5 km)	1,850 yd (1,690 m)
EF5	3 deaths – See article on this tornado – This deadly tornado touched down south of Enderlin and rapidly intensified, tipping over 28 train cars and lofting 5 more. one of those were lofted over 475 ft away from its starting location. it continued on , killing 3 people as it curved around the town and dissipated. the tornado was given an initial rating of High-end EF3 before being upgraded to EF5 on October 6th. making it the first EF5 tornado in over 12 years and ending the EF5 drought						
EF1	N of Oriska	Barnes	ND	46.9787°N 97.8546°W	04:17–04:22	5.01 mi (8.06 km)	800 yd (730 m)
EF1	Two farmsteads sustained damage to several buildings, and ground scouring occurred in fields.						
EF2	NE of Enderlin to WSW of Leonard	Cass, Ransom	ND	46.6703°N 97.5251°W	04:22–04:34	6.82 mi (10.98 km)	1,351 yd (1,235 m)
EF2	This strong tornado touched down just about 2 minutes after the EF5 tornado dissipated by the same supercell, causing extensive tree damage; several trees were snapped or uprooted in the affected area. Additionally, several roofs were partially destroyed. It formed just to the east of the path of the EF5 tornado, although they were not on the ground at the same time.						
EF0	N of Sheldon	Ransom	ND	46.6085°N 97.4899°W	04:35–04:37	0.84 mi (1.35 km)	20 yd (18 m)
EF0	A tornado scar was noted through farm fields on high-resolution satellite imagery.						
EF1	NE of Leonard to W of Kindred	Cass	ND	46.6932°N 97.1747°W	04:44–04:51	6.86 mi (11.04 km)	300 yd (270 m)
EF1	Some tree damage occurred.						
EF0	NE of Leonard	Cass	ND	46.6923°N 97.1589°W	04:45–04:46	0.68 mi (1.09 km)	10 yd (9.1 m)
EF0	This tornado left a scar that was discovered on high-resolution satellite imagery.						
EF0	SW of Davenport	Cass	ND	46.6926°N 97.129°W	04:46–04:47	1.86 mi (2.99 km)	20 yd (18 m)
EF0	A tornado left a scar that was noted on high-resolution satellite imagery.						
EF0	WNW of Kindred	Cass	ND	46.6649°N 97.0529°W	04:50–04:51	0.74 mi (1.19 km)	20 yd (18 m)
EF0	A scar left by a tornado was found on high-resolution satellite imagery.						

=== June 21 event ===
List of confirmed tornadoes – Saturday, June 21, 2025
EF#	Location	Subdivision	Province	Start coord.	Time (UTC)	Path length	Max. width
EF0	SW of Glenbain	Glen Bain	SK	49.83°N 107.05°W	20:55	Unknown	Unknown
EF0	A brief tornado caused no known damage.						
EF0	N of Cabri	Riverside	SK	50.65°N 108.46°W	22:15	Unknown	Unknown
EF0	A brief tornado caused no known damage.						

=== June 22 event ===
List of confirmed tornadoes – Sunday, June 22, 2025
EF#	Location	County / parish	State	Start coord.	Time (UTC)	Path length	Max. width
EF1	Clark Mills to N of Clinton	Oneida	NY	43.0928°N 75.3669°W	07:58–08:03	2.43 mi (3.91 km)	300 yd (270 m)
EF1	3 deaths – See section on this tornado.						
EF1	Lairdsville to Franklin Springs	Oneida	NY	43.0897°N 75.4404°W	07:59–08:10	4.74 mi (7.63 km)	450 yd (410 m)
EF1	Another spin-up tornado was spawned by the early morning line of severe thunderstorms and was on the ground simultaneously with the EF1 tornado above. It touched down just south of Westmoreland where tree branches were broken, quickly moving into Lairdsville where roofs were damaged. It continued through more rural areas, causing significant damage to farm silo and outbuildings in addition to snapping or uprooting trees. Continuing southeast, it snapped trees on the western edge of the Hamilton College campus before turning more sharply southeast and dissipating.						
