= Blue Flint Ethanol =

Coordinates: 47°22′36″N 101°09′09″W

Blue Flint Ethanol is a bioethanol producing company and a production plant with a same name, located in Underwood, North Dakota approximately 50 miles (80 km) north of Bismarck. The plant is unique in the fact that rather than burning fuels, such as coal or natural gas to drive the production process, waste heat from electrical generation at the Coal Creek Station is used. The US$100 million plant is capable of processing 18 million bushels (460,000 metric tons) of corn to produce 50 million gallons (190 million liters) of ethanol each year, and is estimated to have a net annual economic impact of $160 million on the North Dakota economy, as well as the creation of approximately 40 new jobs to run the plant. In addition to producing ethanol the plant will also produce dry distillers grains, a byproduct of the distillation process which is used as animal feed. Of the 18 million bushels of corn used each year for feedstock, the majority will be grown in southeast North Dakota and brought in via rail, with the remaining one third being produced locally. In 2006 the Blue Flint Ethanol project was awarded the Project of the Year Award by Governor John Hoeven.

== History ==
The Coal Creek power station which provides the thermal input to the process began construction in 1974, becoming fully operational for electricity production in 1980. The power plant had already been using heat from some of the steam to dry the lignite coal it burns as fuel, improving its efficiency, however 60% of the steam's heat energy was still being lost. In 2005 Headwaters Incorporated, in conjunction with Great River Energy, announced their plans for the construction of an ethanol production facility collocated with the Coal Creek Power plant. The plant will be majority owned by Headwaters who will manage the construction and plant operations, with GRE owning a minority share of the plant. Construction of the facility took place during 2006 with ethanol production beginning in February 2007. In 2010, Headwaters sold its 51 percent ownership to Great River Energy which now has full ownership of the plant.

== Similar facilities ==
Although the Blue Flint Ethanol plant is the first in the United States to utilize waste heat for ethanol production, other plants are starting to pursue similar strategies. Great River Energy is also building a 62 megawatt baseload (37 megawatt peaking capacity) coal-fired boiler in Spiritwood, North Dakota which will produce both electricity, malt, and 100 million U.S. gallons (380 million liters) of ethanol yearly. Additionally a 20 megawatt plant in Goodland, Kansas will produce electricity, ethanol, and biodiesel.

== See also ==
- Cogeneration - commonly referred to as combined heat and power (CHP)
- Ethanol fuel in the United States
- Ethanol fermentation
- Corn ethanol
- Cellulosic ethanol
- Biofuel
