= Tornado outbreak and derecho of June 19–22, 2025 =

2025 tornado outbreak and derecho

- Radar loop of the derecho as it passed over North Dakota, Minnesota and other states and Ontario, Canada on June 20 through the night of June 21. Tornadic supercells can also be seen in eastern North Dakota prior to the derecho reaching and absorbing them.

Meteorological history
- Duration: June 19–22, 2025

Tornado outbreak
- Tornadoes: 40
- Max. rating: EF5 tornado
- Duration: 2 days, 9 hours, 47 minutes
- Highest winds: Tornadic – >210 mph (340 km/h) (Enderlin, North Dakota EF5 on June 20)
- Largest hail: 4 in (10 cm) near the Jamestown Dam on June 20th

Derecho
- Highest gusts: 120 mph (190 km/h) (Beltrami County, Minnesota)

Extratropical cyclone
- Lowest pressure: 989 hPa (mbar); 29.21 inHg
- Max. rainfall: 6.5 in (170 mm) (Chenango County, New York)

Overall effects
- Fatalities: 7 (6 tornadic, 1 from downburst)
- Injuries: >4
- Damage: $875 million (2025 USD)
- Areas affected: Northern United States (Great Plains), Southern Canada, Northeastern United States
- Part of the tornado outbreaks of 2025

A significant tornado outbreak and long-lived derecho affected large portions of the northern United States and southern Canada from June 19–22, 2025, producing widespread destructive winds, numerous tornadoes, large hail, and flash flooding. The multi-day severe weather event impacted the Great Plains, Upper Midwest, and parts of the Northeastern United States, while also producing multiple tornadoes in the Canadian province of Saskatchewan. On June 20, a violent tornado struck rural areas east of Enderlin, North Dakota, resulting in multiple fatalities and catastrophic damage. The tornado was later rated EF5 on October 6th, 2025 following a post-event damage survey, marking the first EF5-rated tornado in over 12 years. Additional tornadoes occurred across North Dakota the same day, while a powerful derecho produced hurricane-force straight-line winds across Montana, Minnesota, and the Dakotas. The highest confirmed wind gust during the event reached 120 mph (190 km/h) in Minnesota, causing extensive damage to infrastructure, agriculture, and power networks.

As the storm system continued to move eastward, it evolved into an intense squall line that affected southern Ontario on June 21. Widespread damaging winds, downbursts, and flash flooding were reported, with one fatality attributed to a downburst. The system then moved into the Northeastern United States early on June 22, generating additional severe weather, including an EF1 tornado in Clark Mills, New York, which killed three people.

In total, the outbreak produced approximately 40 confirmed tornadoes across the United States and Canada and resulted in seven fatalities. Damage estimates reached approximately $875 million (USD), largely due to widespread wind damage from the derecho and associated convective systems.

== Meteorological synopsis ==
=== June 19 ===
The Storm Prediction Center (SPC) had been monitoring favorable conditions for storm development in the Northern Plains/Upper Midwest region since June 18, noting limited low-level moisture and instability with modest wind shear yet steep lapse rates allowing for the development of weak thunderstorms in the area, which could in turn create a threat for isolated wind gusts and large hail. Although an upper-level ridge was present throughout this region on June 19, a weak mid-level shortwave trough moved over the Canadian Prairies which, in combination with a strengthening low-level jet and the advection of warm, moist air, allowed for robust thunderstorm development with the primary threat being large hail and isolated strong wind gusts.

=== June 20 ===
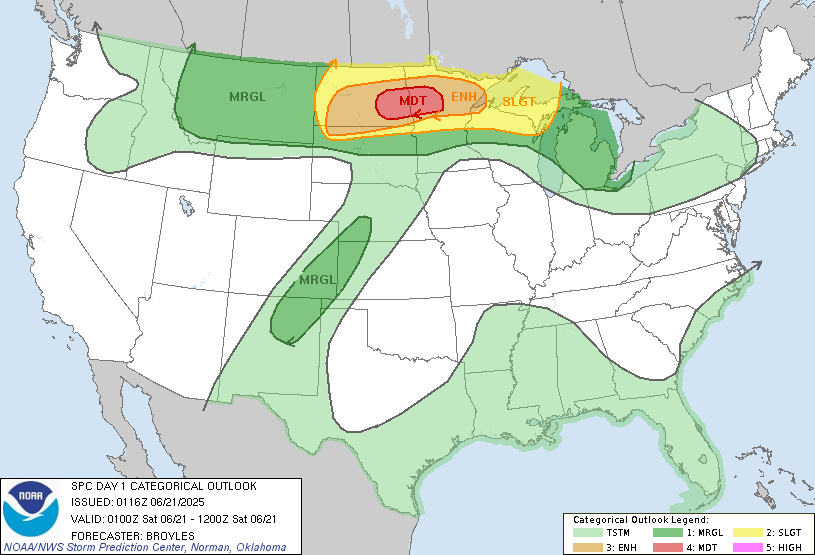

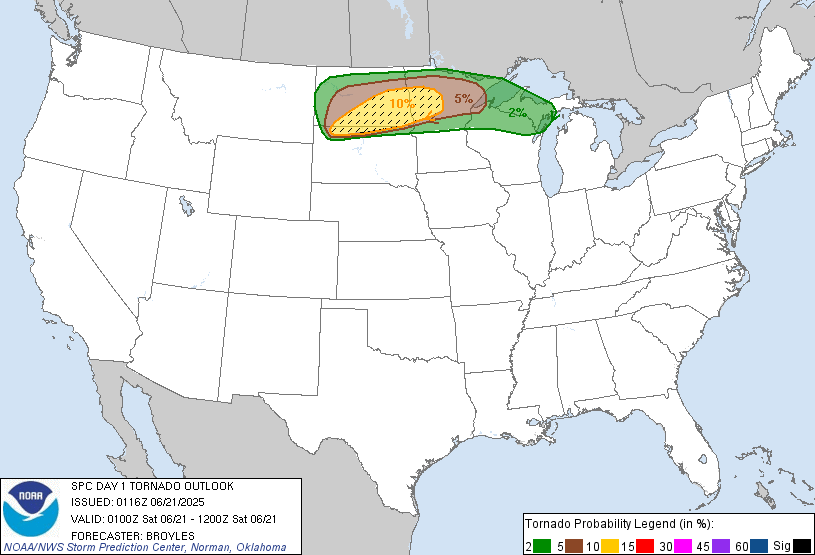
SPC outlooks issued at 01Z, about three hours before the tornado touched down. A wind-driven moderate risk was issued for the area, although the possibility of a strong tornado was mentioned.

On June 15, the Storm Prediction Center (SPC) noted on its Day 6 outlook that a shortwave, mid-level ridge was forecasted to traverse into the upper Mississippi River valley and remain over the region as mid-level heights increase. Beneath the ridge, a moist and unstable airmass was expected to be in place from the lower to mid-Missouri Valley, northeastward into the western Great Lakes region. Instability and deep-layer shear were sufficient for a localized severe threat, though uncertainties remained on where the greatest potential for convection would be.

A seasonally strong mid-level trough was forecast to eject over the Northern Plains on June 20, which featured moderate upper-level divergence to promote lift and shear support. The Storm Prediction Center (SPC) Day 2 outlook mentioned that "a small area of uncapped and very unstable air mass, perhaps over northeast SD and southeast ND. Here, a conditional supercell and tornado risk will exist ... very large hail and tornadoes appear likely." Supercells began developing across eastern North Dakota, around the Jamestown area, in the evening of June 20. Although they were initially elevated, the strengthening low-level jet and isentropic/geostrophic ascent contributed to eroding the convective inhibition that was in place, allowing them to become more surface-based. Additionally, a nearby frontal boundary provided extreme storm-relative helicity which further supported surface-based shear and streamwise vorticity as well as development of rotation or mesocyclogenesis within the supercells.

== Confirmed tornadoes ==
Confirmed tornadoes by Enhanced Fujita rating
EFU	EF0	EF1	EF2	EF3	EF4	EF5	Total
5	14	13	6	1	0	1	40

=== Spiritwood–Urbana, North Dakota ===
Spiritwood–Urbana, North Dakota
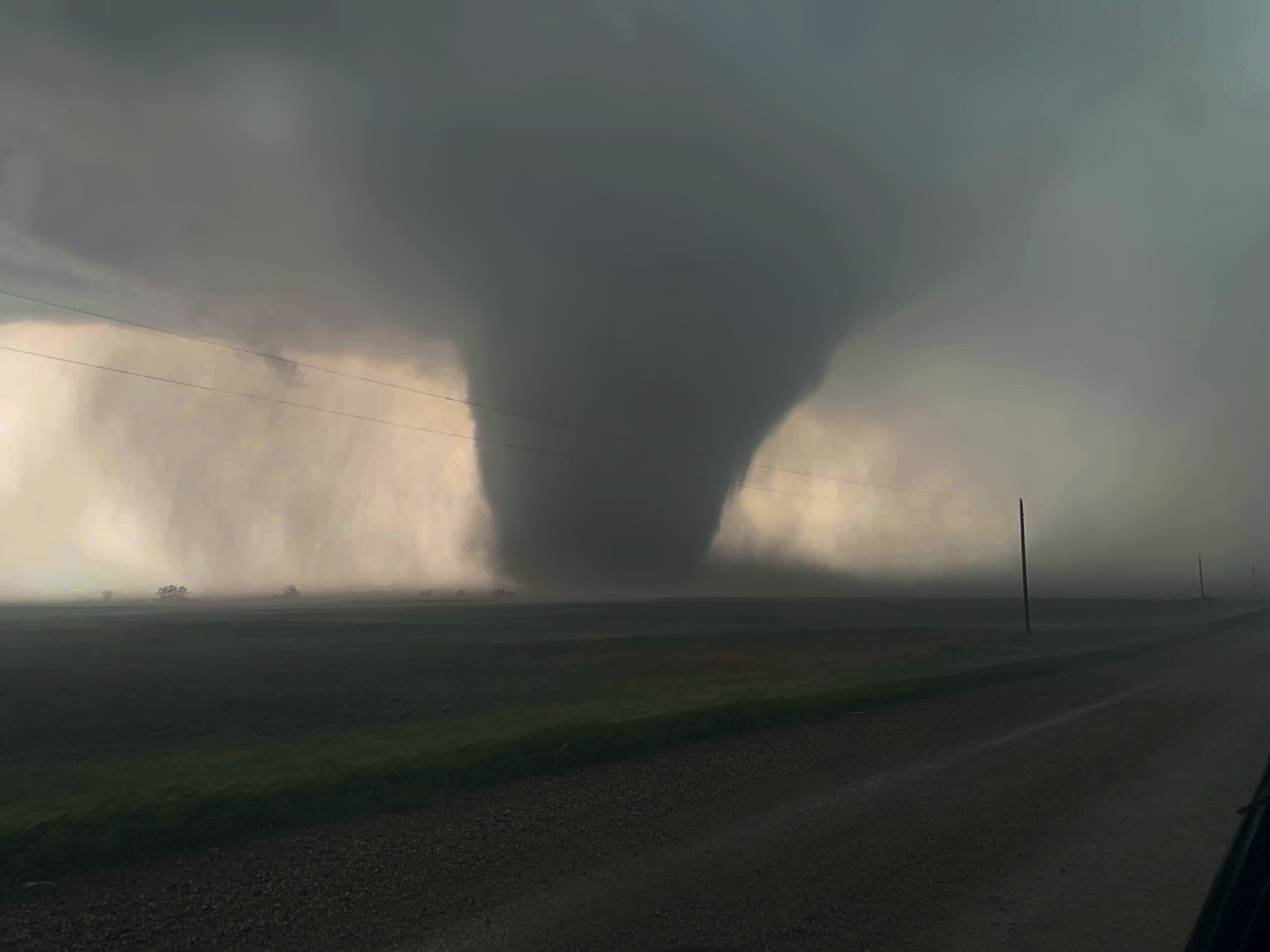
- The EF3 tornado, slowly obscured in rain by the rear flank downdraft northwest of Urbana.

Meteorological history
- Formed: June 20, 2025, 8:51 p.m. CDT (UTC–05:00)
- Dissipated: June 20, 2025, 9:20 p.m. CDT (UTC-05:00)
- Duration: 29 minutes

EF3 tornado
- on the Enhanced Fujita scale
- Highest winds: 155 mph (249 km/h)

Overall effects
- Fatalities: 0
- Injuries: 0
- Damage: Unknown

At 8:51 p.m. CDT (01:51 UTC), this slow-moving and very intense tornado touched down to the east of a Great River Energy station, located south of Spiritwood in eastern Stutsman County. The tornado was widely documented as a "bowl-shaped" condensation funnel, with numerous suction vortices dancing underneath by dozens of storm chasers, as it first traveled to the northeast along 34th Street SE.

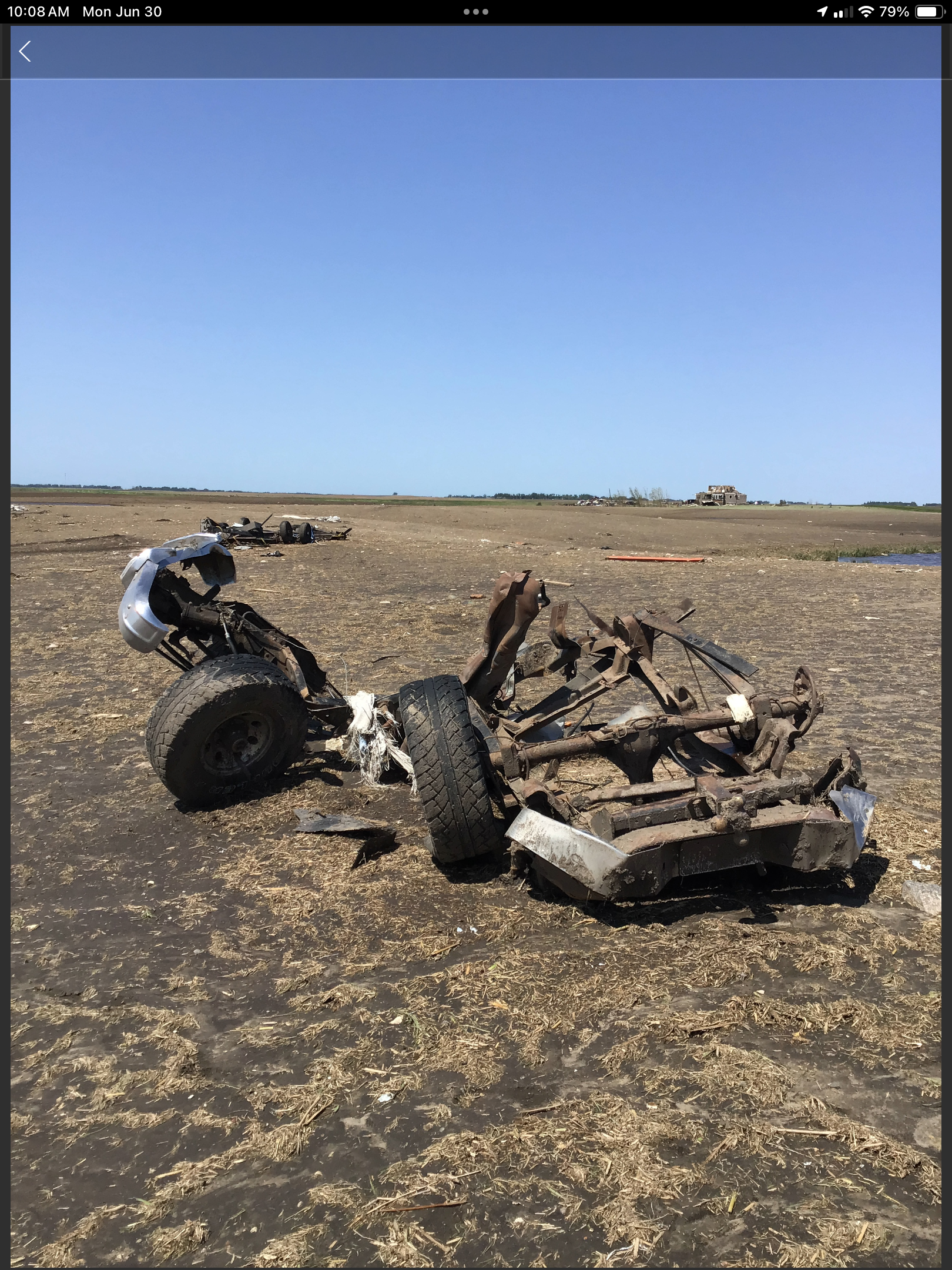
The tornado shredded vehicles and threw them into a barren field. The vehicles originated from the farmstead in the background.

The tornado then fully condensed and crossed into Barnes County, where it began to intensify drastically and start heading more to the north and east. The parent supercell's rear flank downdraft started to wrap around the circulation at this time, with extreme winds observed in excess of 70 mph (110 km/h), though an estimate at 100 mph (160 km/h) was possible. Along 33rd Street SE, the tornado caused EF0 damage to a home west of the Urbana area. The accompanying rear flank downdraft then fully cloaked the tornado behind a heavy curtain of rain, as it began to approach a farmstead. Along the intersection grid of 97th Avenue SE and 32nd Street SE, the tornado then impacted the entire farm, causing EF2 damage to the residence and EF3 damage to a metal farm building that was completely destroyed. A family was sheltering inside the home's basement bathroom as the tornado struck. Vehicles from the property were hurled or deposited in a south-southeastern direction, at a distance of 0.2–0.25 mi (0.32–0.40 km). The rainwrapped tornado headed due north, parallel to 97th Avenue SE as it destroyed another but older farmhouse built in 1891, and debarked trees at EF3 intensity before weakening and moving to the northwest. The occluding tornado reentered Stutsman County before dissipating at 9:20 p.m. CDT (02:20 UTC).

This large tornado was the second, and strongest of a family of tornadoes from a long-lived supercell that tracked from Jamestown to the eastern parts of North Dakota. During its 29-minute lifespan, it traveled along a path of 10.94 mi (17.61 km) and had a maximum width of 990 yd (0.56 mi; 0.91 km). This was the strongest tornado to affect Barnes County, since an F4 tornado struck near Litchville and Marion on July 18, 2004.

=== Enderlin, North Dakota ===
Enderlin, North Dakota
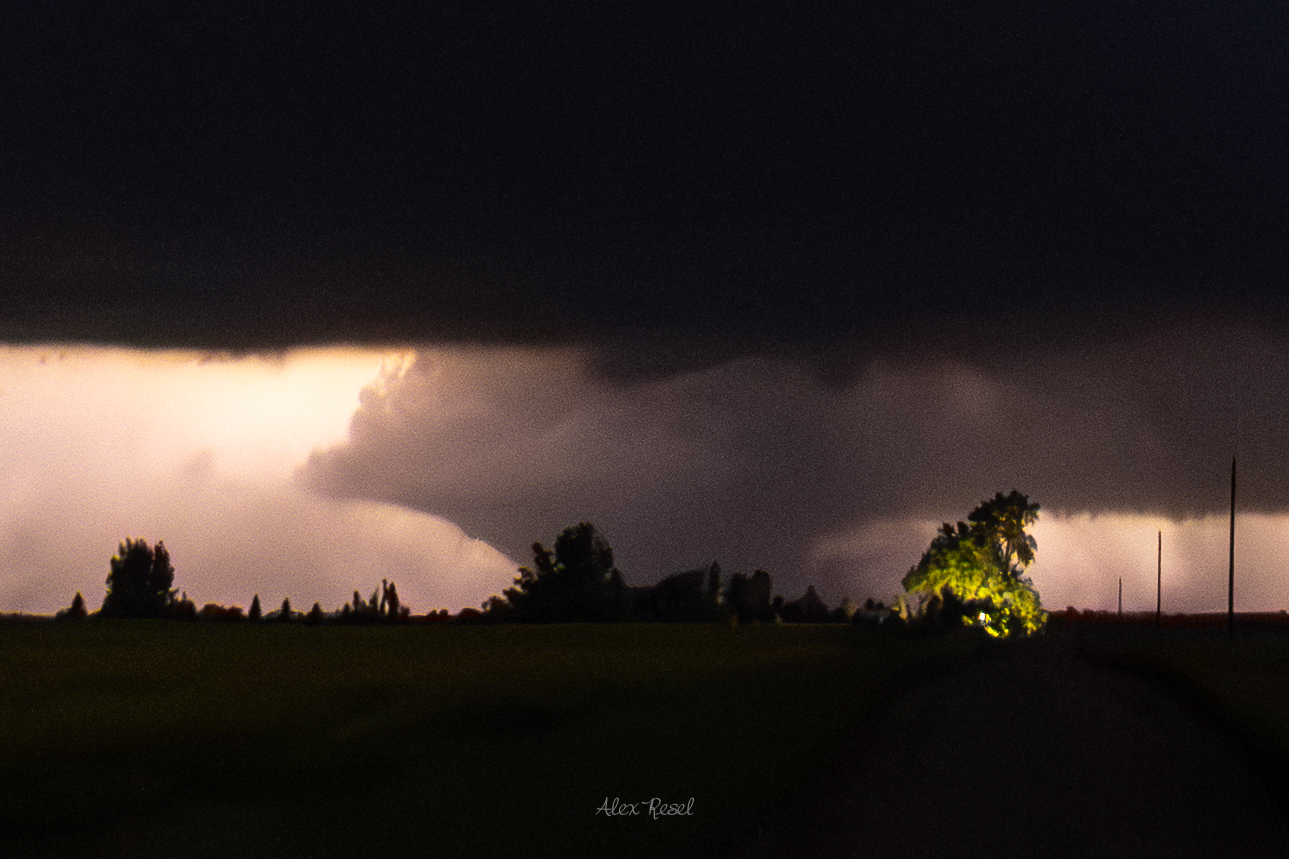
- A photo of the tornado near peak intensity, when several train cars were derailed.

Meteorological history
- Formed: June 20, 2025, 11:04 p.m. CDT (UTC–05:00)
- Dissipated: June 20, 2025, 11:20 p.m. CDT (UTC-05:00)
- Duration: 16 minutes

EF5 tornado
- on the Enhanced Fujita scale
- Highest winds: >210 mph (340 km/h)

Overall effects
- Fatalities: 3
- Injuries: 0
- Damage: Unknown

This very large, violent, and deadly tornado touched down at 11:04 p.m. CDT (04:04 UTC) in rural Ransom County, south of Enderlin. It initially snapped tree branches at EF0 intensity, before the tornado intensified and widened as it moved northeastward across County Road 55 through open fields. The tornado then impacted the ADM Edible Bean Specialties facility at the corner of 136th Avenue SE and County Road 136 at EF2 strength, snapping large trees and destroying an outbuilding.

The tornado then rapidly intensified as it continued northeastward, reaching EF5 intensity as it crossed CPKC's Elbow Lake Subdivision southeast of Enderlin, to northwest of Sheldon, derailing several train cars on a stopped freight train, including one empty tanker car that was thrown 475.5 feet (144.9 m) south of ND 46. Initially, this damage was left unrated, but further analysis determined that there was forensic damage of the lofting of empty tanker cars weighing up to 72,000 pounds (33,000 kg) and tipping over fully loaded grain hopper cars weighing up to 286,000 pounds (130,000 kg) each. Based on this, the rating for this location was upgraded to EF5 with wind speeds greater than 210 mph (340 km/h) on October 6, 2025, the first F5/EF5 tornado to occur in North Dakota since the Fargo tornado exactly 68 years prior. Continuing north, the tornado blew over a cell tower, damaged crop fields, and snapped large trees, debarking some of them. A farmhouse was also swept away, and nearby outbuildings were destroyed. Crossing ND 46 into Cass County, two farmhouses were particularly devastated at EF4 intensity, with two fatalities occurring in the area. The first was swept away while the other was leveled. The tornado then began to turn northwest, leveling another home, which caused another fatality, and bending over tall steel electrical transmission towers before weakening and dissipating at 11:20 p.m. UTC (04:20 UTC)

Overall, the tornado was on the ground for 16 minutes, had a path length of 12.10 mi (19.47 km), and reached a peak width of 1,850 yd (1.05 mi; 1.69 km). The tornado was the first to be rated EF5 on the Enhanced Fujita scale since the Moore, Oklahoma, tornado on May 20, 2013, and was the first F5/EF5 tornado to occur in North Dakota since the Fargo tornado exactly 68 years prior.

=== Clark Mills–Clinton, New York ===
Clark Mills–Clinton, New York
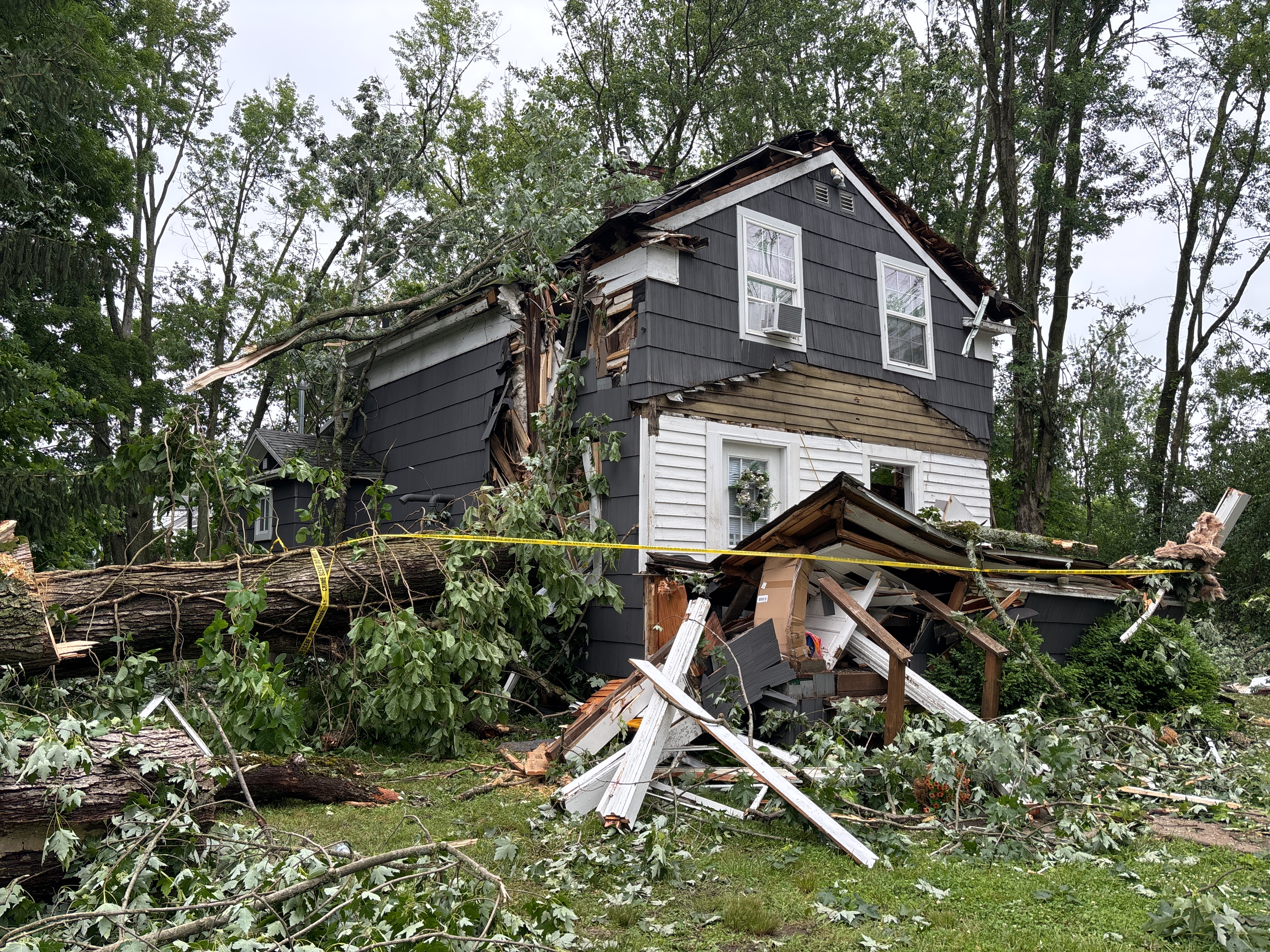
- A tree uprooted by the tornado fell into a house, killing two young girls inside.

Meteorological history
- Formed: June 22, 2025, 3:58 a.m. EDT (UTC–04:00)
- Dissipated: June 22, 2025, 4:03 a.m. EDT (UTC-04:00)
- Duration: 5 minutes

EF1 tornado
- on the Enhanced Fujita scale
- Highest winds: 105 mph (169 km/h)

Overall effects
- Fatalities: 3
- Injuries: 0
- Damage: $440,000

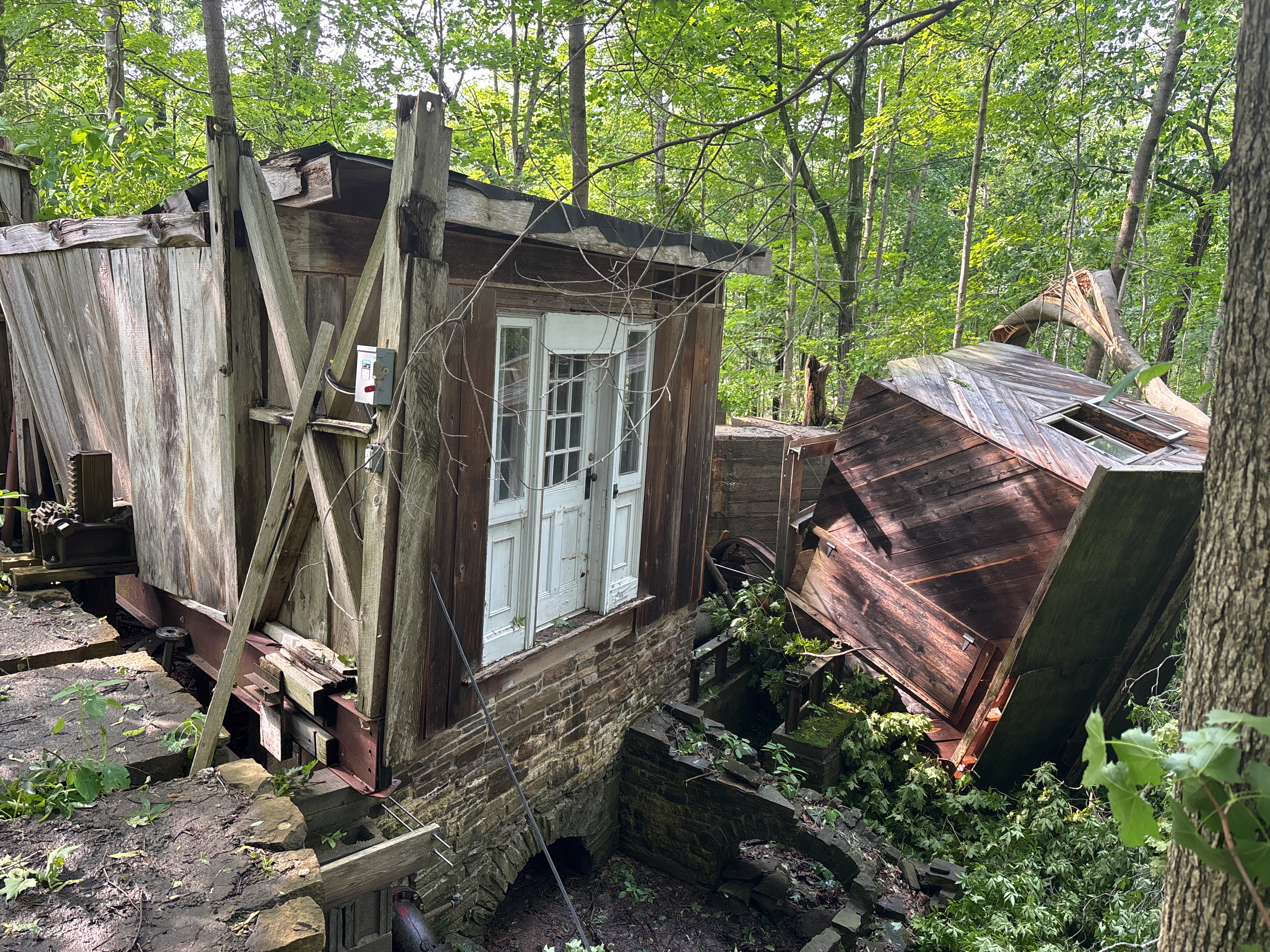
The destroyed grist mill adjacent to the creek.

The same line of thunderstorms associated with the earlier derecho continued to move across the Northern United States and Southern Canada, reaching New York by the early morning of June 22. This deadly QLCS tornado formed along a kink in this line, affecting the hamlet of Clark Mills, where three people were killed. The tornado first touched down within Clark Mills and moved southwestward through the hamlet, where it snapped or uprooted many trees. In this area, three people were killed when downed trees cut through and crushed their houses. In one house, six-year-old twin girls were killed by a tree that sliced through it, and a 50-year-old woman was killed in another location when a tree fell through the roof and crushed one end of her home; all victims were pronounced dead on the scene. Overall, this made the tornado the second-deadliest in New York state history. The tornado then turned sharply to the south, destroying a historic grist mill near Oriskany Creek with nearby heavy machinery being tossed into the creek. Continuing south, it began to move through more rural areas, causing more tree damage before turning southeast and dissipating. The tornado became the third deadliest in New York since records began in 1950.

While a tornado warning was issued for south-central Oneida County due to radar-indicated rotation, the tornado initially formed outside of the polygon in an area that was just under a severe thunderstorm warning, although it did have a tornado possible tag. This was due to the warning being for another EF1 tornado that formed around the same time to the west of this one. Additionally, the rotation was assessed as being much farther south than it actually was. This meant that not all of Clark Mills’ residents, including the three victims and their families, received the warning; many residents confirmed that they did not receive any warning. The early-morning time of this tornado also meant that most people were asleep as it touched down, so the warning may not have been able to reach them. It was further clarified that the recent staffing cuts to NOAA and the NWS did not affect the Binghamton office.

== Non-tornadic impacts ==
=== Derecho ===
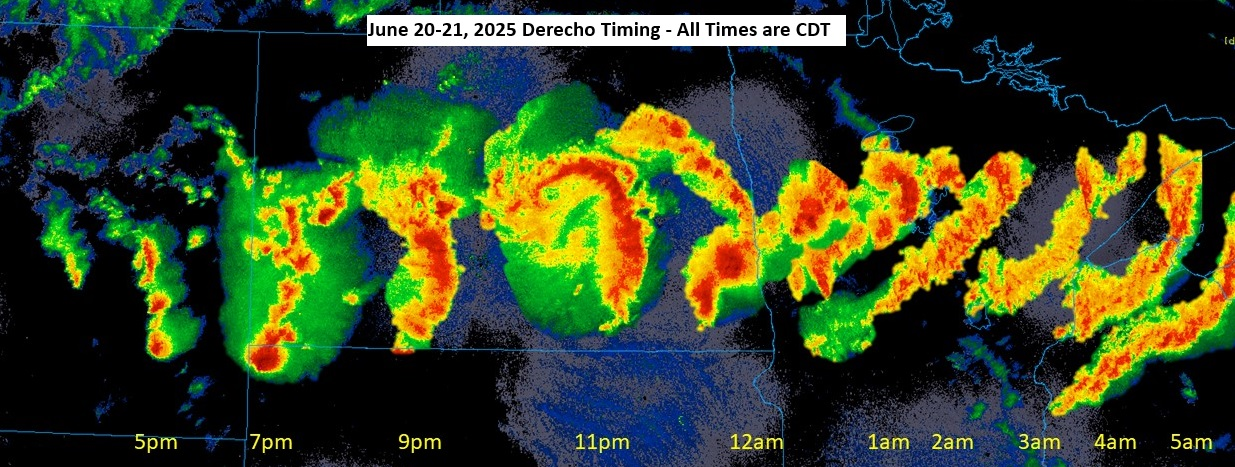
Progression of the derecho as it passed through North Dakota, Minnesota, and Ontario overnight on June 20–21

The derecho left over 23,000 people without power in the state of North Dakota. In Bemidji, Minnesota, the derecho blew out windows in a hospital, flipped several vehicles, and blew down more than 9 million trees. Wind speeds at the Bemidji airport were recorded at 106 mph (171 km/h).

=== June 21–22 severe storms ===
Canadian downburst strengths (Note: The Enhanced Fujita Scale is also used by the Northern Tornadoes Project to rate the damage done by downbursts as well as tornadoes.)
EF0	EF1	EF2	EF3	EF4	EF5
20	10	1	0	0	0

Severe thunderstorms moved into southern Ontario on the evening of June 21 and the early morning of June 22, causing widespread wind damage and several downbursts. The Samuel de Champlain Provincial Park, a popular summer camping spot, was particularly affected by an EF2-rated downburst; hundreds were left stranded due to flash flooding and a particularly strong downburst which downed trees and power lines, blocking off roads, and injured several people. Similar severe weather effects were felt in other areas, such as Algonquin Provincial Park, where two separate downbursts occurred in the area. One of the two caused a tree to fall on a tent, injuring a boy camping with his mother. Finally, in Mallorytown, Ontario, another downburst uprooted several trees, one of which fell on a tent occupied by a father with his young child; the father was killed while the child survived with serious but non-life-threatening injuries. Several municipalities declared states of emergency due to the "devastation" brought by the severe storms. Several downbursts were reported in Quebec on the nighth of June 23. Overall, the downbursts in Canada caused one fatality and at least four injuries.

This same line of storms also pushed into New York on June 22, causing severe wind gusts, some up to 70 mph (110 km/h), which downed trees and power lines. This resulted in blocked roads and loss of power in the region. Additionally, rain brought by the storms caused localized flooding. Extreme rainfall prompted a rare flash flood emergency for six hours for Chenango County, New York as approximately 6.5 in (170 mm) of rain fell. Many people were stranded by flood waters as they flooded creeks, roadways, and homes.

== See also ==
- Weather of 2025
- List of derecho events
- List of North American tornadoes and tornado outbreaks
- Tornado outbreak and derecho of June 16–18, 2010 – Another violent tornado outbreak that occurred in the same region
- Tornado outbreak of June 16–18, 2014 – Another violent tornado outbreak that occurred in the month of June
