= CU (power line) =

Electric power transmission line in the USA

- Map of CU

Location
- Country: United States

Technical information
- Current type: HVDC

CU is the designation of a line for high-voltage direct current (HVDC) transmission between the Coal Creek Station power plant south of Underwood, North Dakota at 47°22′24″N 101°9′23″W and the Dickinson converter station near Buffalo, Minnesota at 45°06′40″N 93°48′36″W.

The designation refers to the two Minnesota-based power generation/transmission cooperatives that built the line and Coal Creek Station as a joint venture: Cooperative Power Association and United Power Association (both later merged to become Great River Energy). As part of Minnesota's commitment to carbon-free energy, Great River Energy announced intentions to close the mine and begin demolition of the plant in 2022. A group of people stepped up to take over ownership, ensuring the region's largest power plant will continue as long as economically feasible.

The CU project controversy in 1978 and 1979 was a result of protests by farm landowners in the path of the CU line right of way.

The CU line, which went in service in 1978, can transfer an electrical power of 1,000 megawatts at a symmetrical transmission voltage of 400 kV. An overhead line connection 436 miles (710 kilometers) long is used, with two conductors per pole. Thyristor static inverters are used.

== Crossing of HVDC powerlines ==
Southeast of Wing, North Dakota, at 47°02′48″N 100°05′49″W CU crosses Square Butte, another HVDC powerline. This is the only crossing point of two HVDC overhead powerlines in the Western hemisphere.

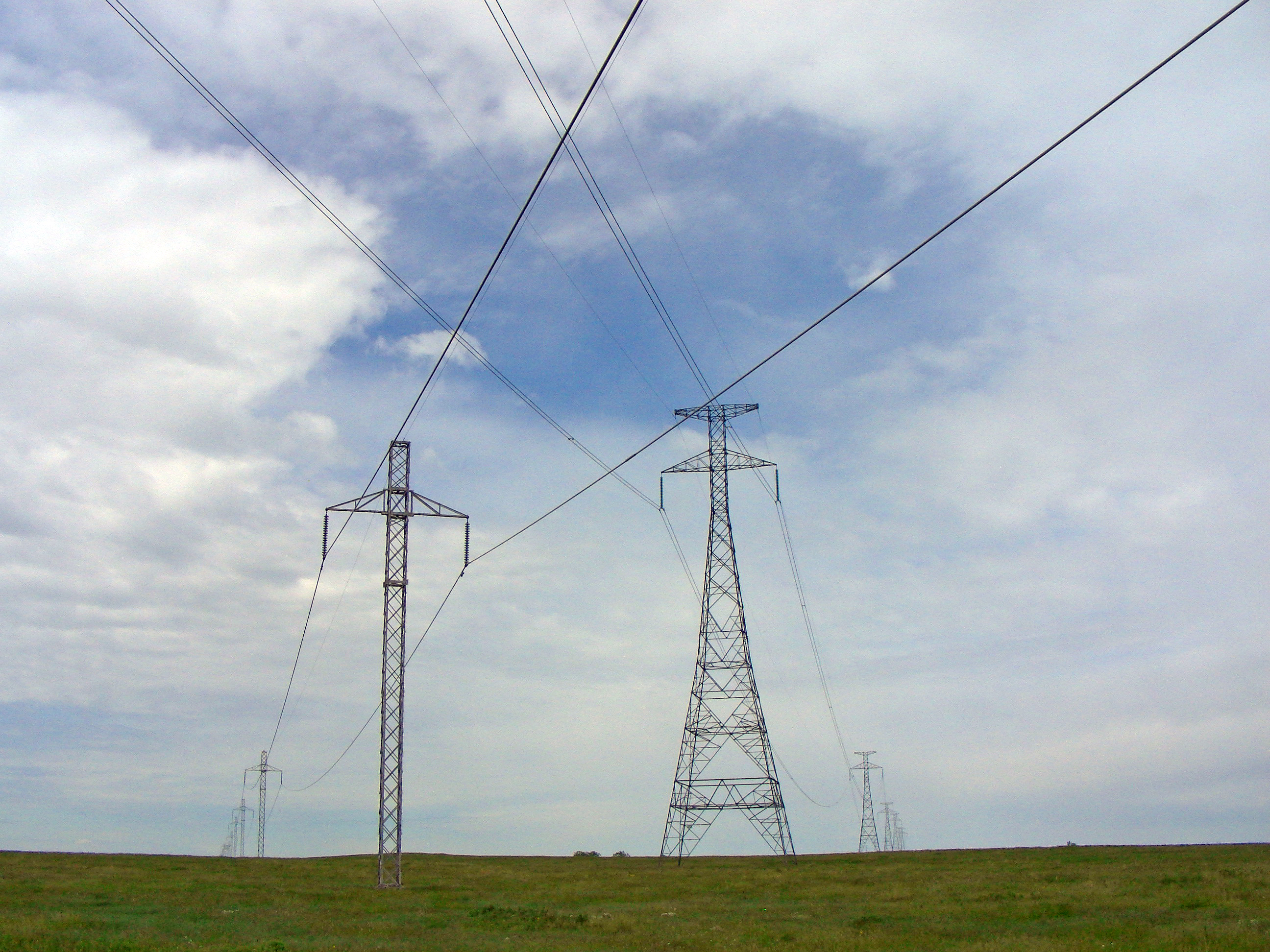
CU is the line of towers on the right, crossing the Square Butte line on the left. Near Wing, North Dakota.

== Electrodes ==
The ground return electrode line at Coal Creek Station uses the towers of the AC line between 47°22′28.01″N 101°9′47.65″W and 47°22′43.03″N 101°10′4.94″W as support before it ends at 47°24′53.2″N 101°13′40.81″W.

The electrode line at Dickinson converter plant runs on the towers of the main line until a tower at 45°9′27.81″N 94°2′15.06″W. From this tower it runs on a line on 4 poles until its endpoint situated at 45°9′33.73″N 94°2′23.74″W.
