= CU project controversy =

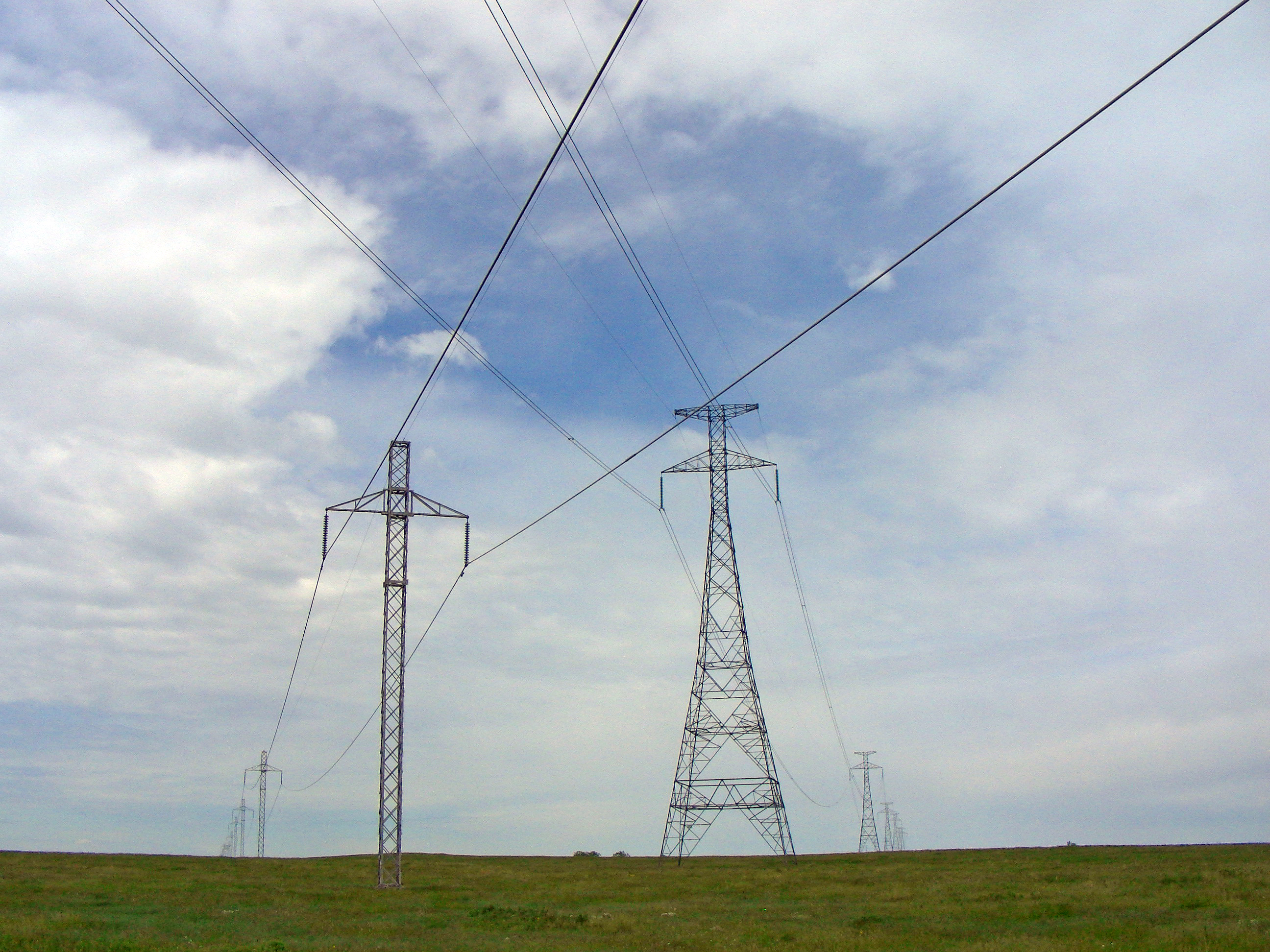
The CU powerline (on the right) was the subject of controversy and protests

The CU project controversy involved years of protest against a proposed high-voltage direct current powerline that was erected on the property of hundreds of farmers in west central Minnesota in the late 1970s. The electrical cooperatives Cooperative Power Association (CPA) and United Power Association (UPA) proposed construction of the powerline, which was part of a larger project that also involved the construction of an electrical generating station and coal mine.

Opposition to the powerline began in 1974 and involved political parties, churches, civic organizations, and businesses in several different Minnesota counties. Farmers were concerned that construction of the powerline on their land might make farming difficult, reduce the value of the land, or adversely impact their health. The powerline was reviewed in 33 meetings in North Dakota and 48 meetings in Minnesota and in two years of hearings; at the time, no other powerline in Minnesota state history had gone through such a drawn-out review process. Multiple candidates for state office included the powerline issue as part of their platforms.

Farmers employed tractors, manure spreaders, and ammonia sprayers and used direct action and civil disobedience in an attempt to prevent construction of the line. Powerline protests drew national attention when over 200 state troopers, nearly half the Minnesota Highway Patrol, were deployed to ensure that construction of the line would continue. During a two-year period, a group of opponents to the line who called themselves "bolt weevils" tore down 14 powerline towers and shot out nearly 10,000 electrical insulators.

== Background ==
=== The growth of electrical co-ops ===
The CU Powerline Project was initiated by the Cooperative Power Association (CPA) of Edina, Minnesota and the United Power Association (UPA) of Elk River, Minnesota. The CPA and UPA were Minnesota electrical generation and transmission associations of a combined total of 34 retail electrical co-ops. Retail electrical co-ops developed following the establishment of the Rural Electrification Administration (REA) in 1935 and the Rural Electrification Act in 1936. The REA began to distribute loans to groups involved in increasing access to electricity in the rural United States. Retail electrical co-ops formed in order to be eligible for the REA's distribution loans. Co-ops often combined in federations to purchase power from private utilities or federal agencies. Occasionally these co-op associations built their own generating stations.

=== Motivation behind the CU project ===
Several factors led the UPA and CPA to undertake the CU project. The UPA and CPA traditionally purchased most of their power from the Bureau of Reclamation's Garrison Dam on the Missouri River in North Dakota. The UPA and CPA wanted to curtail their purchase of power to avoid the long term contract commitments. They desired to increase their "control over their energy supplies and costs". The UPA and CPA predicted that they would not be able to meet the demand of retail co-op members for their electricity. As a result of the oil crisis of the 1970s, oil prices more than doubled from 1973 to 1978. The UPA and CPA believed that consumers would switch to electricity as a source of power to avoid high oil prices. Demand for the electricity provided by the UPA and CPA was already growing and the UPA and CPA predicted that this growth would continue at the same rate. A 1972 study of the CU project's feasibility predicted that the UPA and CPA would face a "projected power generation deficit of 665 megawatts by 1978". As well, the UPA and CPA needed the CU project to meet their agreements with the Mid-continent Area Power Pool (MAPP), an association of twenty-eight utilities serving seven states in the Midwest. In order to join the MAPP, the UPA and CPA had to sign an agreement that obligated them to "power pool" or maintain a 15% surplus of power for sale to the other members of the MAPP.

=== CU project and the REA ===
In 1972, the UPA and CPA approached the REA about the possibility of building a new generating station. The REA favored a lignite coal generator in North Dakota over a Minnesota plant using Montana coal shipped by train. The REA had financed other lignite coal generators in North Dakota, three of which were among the ten most economical plants in the country in the early 1970s. The REA agreed to finance the construction through low-interest loans. At the time of construction, the CU project was the largest and most expensive single project in the history of the REA. When the project was announced, there was only one other comparable high voltage powerline in the United States: the Bonneville Power Administration's Pacific Intertie that runs from Oregon to Los Angeles.

== CU project ==
=== Components ===
The CU project consists of three parts: the Falkirk Mine, the Coal Creek Generating Station, and the CU Powerline. A subsidiary of North American Coal Corporation runs the Falkirk Mine, a lignite coal strip mine in North Dakota that covers over twenty-five square miles and uses two of the biggest dragline excavators ever assembled. The lignite uncovered by the draglines travels by conveyor belt to Coal Creek Station, the largest lignite-fired plant in North Dakota. The Coal Creek Station produces AC current which is converted into DC current at a conversion station. This DC current is transmitted from Coal Creek Station in North Dakota 440 miles (710 km) to a station near Buffalo, Minnesota, where it is converted back into AC current. The powerline crosses nine western and central Minnesota counties and includes a total of 659 towers placed at one-quarter mile intervals on the property of 476 landowners.

=== Arguments against the CU project ===
The first opponents to the CU project were farmers who found out that the powerline would be built on their land. Farmers were upset with the way that the powerline route was initially conceived. In 1973 the UPA and CPA hired a consulting firm which used a numbering system to assess the value of the land between North Dakota and Minnesota. They assigned high numbers (more value) to airports, highways, and wildlife areas but zero to agricultural land. The line would cross diagonally across farms, which farmers believed would disrupt irrigation and aerial spraying and seeding, limit future land use, and reduce the value of the land. Farmers believed that their way of life was being disrupted to "supply mainly urban population centers" with power. The UPA's and CPA's customers did not like the fact that their electricity bills would be increased in order to pay off the loans that the REA and other creditors had granted the UPA and CPA to finance the project. Opponents believed that the CPA and UPA "demand forecasts might be self-serving" and that alternatives to building the line such as conservation were not seriously considered. Farmers worried that the effects of direct electric current on livestock and humans had not been adequately explored.

== Notable protest activities ==
Timeline of CU project controversy
- 1972: The UPA and CPA approached the REA about building a new generating facility
- 1973: The Minnesota Legislature passed the Environmental Policy Act
- 1973: The UPA hired a consulting firm to propose a route and to assess the environmental impact
- 1974: The Minnesota Legislature passed the Power Plant Siting Act
- February 1974: The REA made a conditional loan to the CPA and UPA for the CU project
- July 10, 1974: Public hearing in Grant county on CU project
- July 18, 1974: Grant County farmers formed No Powerline (NPL)
- August 5, 1974: Grant County board agreed to a 90-day stay on any CU project action
- August 1974: Falkirk Mining Company (a subsidiary of North American Coal Company) was created with the purpose of providing coal for the CU project
- 1974: Falkirk and the co-ops signed a coal agreement
- November 21, 1974: Grant County board adopted ordinance requiring a special-use permit for high voltage transmission lines
- February 1975: Pope County farmers form Towers Out of Pope Association (TOOPA)
- February 26, 1975: Grant County planning commission voted to advise the county board to approve a permit for the CU project with restrictions
- February 27, 1975: Farmers from Stearns and Grant counties form Keep Towers Out (KTO)
- March 21, 1975: Farmers from Grant, Stearns and Pope counties form Counties United for a Rural Environment (CURE)
- April 8, 1975: Minnesota Environmental Quality Council (EQC) assumed responsibility for siting the powerline under provisions of the Power Plant Siting Act
- December 8, 1975: Energy Agency began holding hearings to decide whether to issue or deny a certificate of need to the UPA and CPA
- June 3, 1976: The EQC issued a construction permit to the UPA and CPA
- August 11, 1976: A Stearns County district judge issued a stay prohibiting work on the line in Stearns County
- October 4, 1976: A Meeker County district judge issued a restraining order prohibiting surveying in Meeker County
- January 12, 1977: Hearing before a special joint committee of legislative leaders on powerline issue
- November 16, 1977: Five-hundred farmers held a rally at the state capitol
- January 6, 1978: Governor Perpich announced the mobilization of state troopers
- March 5, 1978: Over eight-thousand farmers marched from Lowry to Glenwood
- August 2, 1978: The first electrical tower sabotage
- September 27, 1978: The last of the 1685 electrical towers was erected
- August 1, 1979: The CU powerline officially went into commercial operation
- September 9, 1980: The CPA and UPA requested that the REA assume ownership of the powerline

Following the EQC decision to issue a construction permit to the CPA and UPA and several years of legal battles and public hearings, farmers were "no longer in a mood to work within the system". On June 8, 1976, a farmer smashed a surveying tripod with his tractor and rammed a pickup truck belonging to the survey crew. This was the first act of illegal protest against the powerline.

Following the events of June 8, farmers notified each other by CB radio regarding surveying activities and turned out in groups to block the surveyors' work. As the protests grew in momentum, local radio stations carried news of when and where protesters would gather. The Lowry town hall became the headquarters where protesters, some having traveled from surrounding counties, would gather every morning to make plans. The survey crews began to be accompanied by law enforcement.

Farmers used a variety of tactics to thwart surveying on their property. They raised signs on poles to block the view of the surveyors. When a protester was hauled away for blocking the surveyor's line of sight, another protester would take the original protester's place.Farmers ran chainsaws to make it difficult for surveyors to hear and communicate. On one instance, farmers were granted permission by their town board to repair a road leading to a survey site. When survey crews arrived, farmers had put up roadblocks and were in the process of digging a hole in the road. Farmers used their tractors to pile boulders around the tower base holes preventing concrete from being poured. One farmer parked his truck with the key broken off in the ignition to block cement mixers. Another farmer "drove upwind of a utility crew then switched on his manure spreader". Survey stakes would vanish overnight.

=== Mobilization of state troopers ===
On January 4, 1978, one hundred farmers chased powerline crews from three different sites and "scuffled" with state troopers. Protesters dismantled parts of a tower in full view of the troopers. The following Friday, Governor Perpich ordered what was, at the time, the largest mobilization of state troopers in Minnesota history. National and international news reporters began arriving in Lowry to cover the protest. On January 9, 200 protesters marched across a survey site to hand each trooper a plastic carnation. Protesters also offered troopers coffee and cookies. The protest numbers continued to grow throughout January 1978. Thousands of farmers rallied in Saint Paul, Minnesota. In one community, school was let out so teachers and students could join the rally.

=== "Battle of Stearns County" ===
On February 15, 1978, farmers sprayed troopers with anhydrous ammonia, a fertilizer that can cause serious chemical burns. Media reaction to this act was negative and protesters became divided over tactics. Protesters began making greater use of nonviolent resistance. Protesters covered themselves in pig manure and asked the police to arrest them.

=== "March for Justice" ===
On March 5, 1978 over eight-thousand people marched from Lowry to Glenwood in below freezing temperatures to protest the CU project. Marchers followed a tractor draped with an American flag that carried a coffin labeled "Justice" and a figure labeled "Corporate Giant".

=== "Bolt Weevils" ===
Beginning in August 1978, a group that called themselves the "Bolt Weevils" began to sabotage power line towers and shoot out electrical insulators. The General Assembly to Stop the Powerline (GASP) put out a regular newsletter called Hold That Line. Referring to the actions of the Bolt Weevils, one issue stated, "It is a mistake to label these as acts of vandalism. Vandalism means 'ignorant destruction of property,' and it would be a big misunderstanding to think that these acts are creatures of ignorance." The electrical co-ops hired outside security officers that used helicopters and vehicles to patrol the line. The UPA and CPA launched a public relations campaign to communicate to customers that vandalism would lead to electric bill increases. On August 1, 1979, the CU powerline went into commercial operation. On September 9, 1980, the REA took ownership of the line, in part so that attacks on the line would become federal offenses. In the end, Bolt Weevils toppled 20 power line towers and shot out nearly 10,000 electrical insulators.

== Consequences ==
In the end, protesters were unsuccessful in blocking construction of the powerline. The fight had the unintended consequence of higher payments to farmers whose land was taken for the powerline. From 1976 to 1978, 120 people were arrested in connection with the protest. Four people were convicted of criminal counts and one was convicted of felony charges.

Soon after the powerline entered commercial operation, the UPA and CPA saw a dropoff in demand for electricity. The UPA and CPA ended up selling this surplus electricity to other utilities. Eventually, consumer demand increased. Since 1980, consumer demand for electricity in Minnesota has doubled. In the late 2000s, Xcel Energy, Inc. and 10 other utility companies announced plans to build a new high-voltage transmission line.

A report detailing health concerns about the CU powerline was cited by a judge as a reason to block powerline construction in Texas.

In the mid-2000s, a new group calling itself the "Bolt Weevils" emerged in Minnesota. The group vandalized Novartis/Northrup-King's seed research facility and trampled 50 rows of research corn adjacent to Pioneer Hi-Bred's seed research facility.

== Organizations formed to fight the power line ==
- Counties United for a Rural Environment (CURE): the first umbrella organization for groups fighting the powerline
- Families are Concerned Too (FACT): Pope County anti-powerline group
- General Assembly to Stop the Powerline (GASP): umbrella organization formed in January 1978, based in Lowry, Minnesota
- Keep Towers Out (KTO): Stearns County anti-powerline group
- No Powerline (NPL): Grant County anti-powerline group
- Preserve Grant County (PGC): Grant County anti-powerline group
- Save Our Countryside (SOC): Douglas County anti-powerline group
- Towers Out of Pope Association (TOOPA): Pope County anti-powerline group

== Inspired art ==
- Ecodefense: A Field Guide to Monkeywrenching by Dave Foreman, co-founder of Earth First!, is dedicated in part to the Bolt Weevils

== National television news reports ==
- CBS Evening News for Tuesday, November 14, 1978 (Headline: Powerline 18)
- CBS Evening News for Monday, January 9, 1978 Weather/Minnesota Farmers' Power Line Protest)
- NBC Evening News for Monday, January 9, 1978 Minnesota Farmers Power Line Protest)
- NBC Evening News for Friday, January 6, 1978 (Headline: Minnesota/Power Line/Farmer's Protest)

== See also ==
- Civil disobedience
- Coal Creek Station
- CU (Powerline)
- Direct action
- Sabotage
