= Square Butte (transmission line) =

- Map of Square Butte

Location
- Country: United States

Technical information
- Current type: HVDC

Square Butte is the designation of a high-voltage direct current transmission line in the United States between the Milton R. Young Power Plant near Center, North Dakota at and the Arrowhead converter station near Adolph (a neighborhood of the city of Hermantown near the city of Duluth, Minnesota) at . It was built by Minnkota Power Cooperative and Minnesota Power and went in service in 1977. In 2009, an agreement was executed between the two companies whereby Minnkota gets the rights to all the power currently transmitted over the line (and which is now carried over a newly built 345kV transmission line) while Minnesota Power takes full ownership of the line to transmit power from new sources in the Center area.

Square Butte can transfer up to 500 megawatts at a symmetrical voltage of 250 kV. The whole line is implemented as overhead line on aluminum lattice towers, with a single conductor per HVDC pole (i.e. a total of two for the HDVC bipole), with a length of 449 miles (749 kilometers). The line crosses the Missouri River north of Price between and in a 718 metres long span. As is the case for modern HVDC-systems thyristor static inverters are used.

== Crossing another HVDC line ==
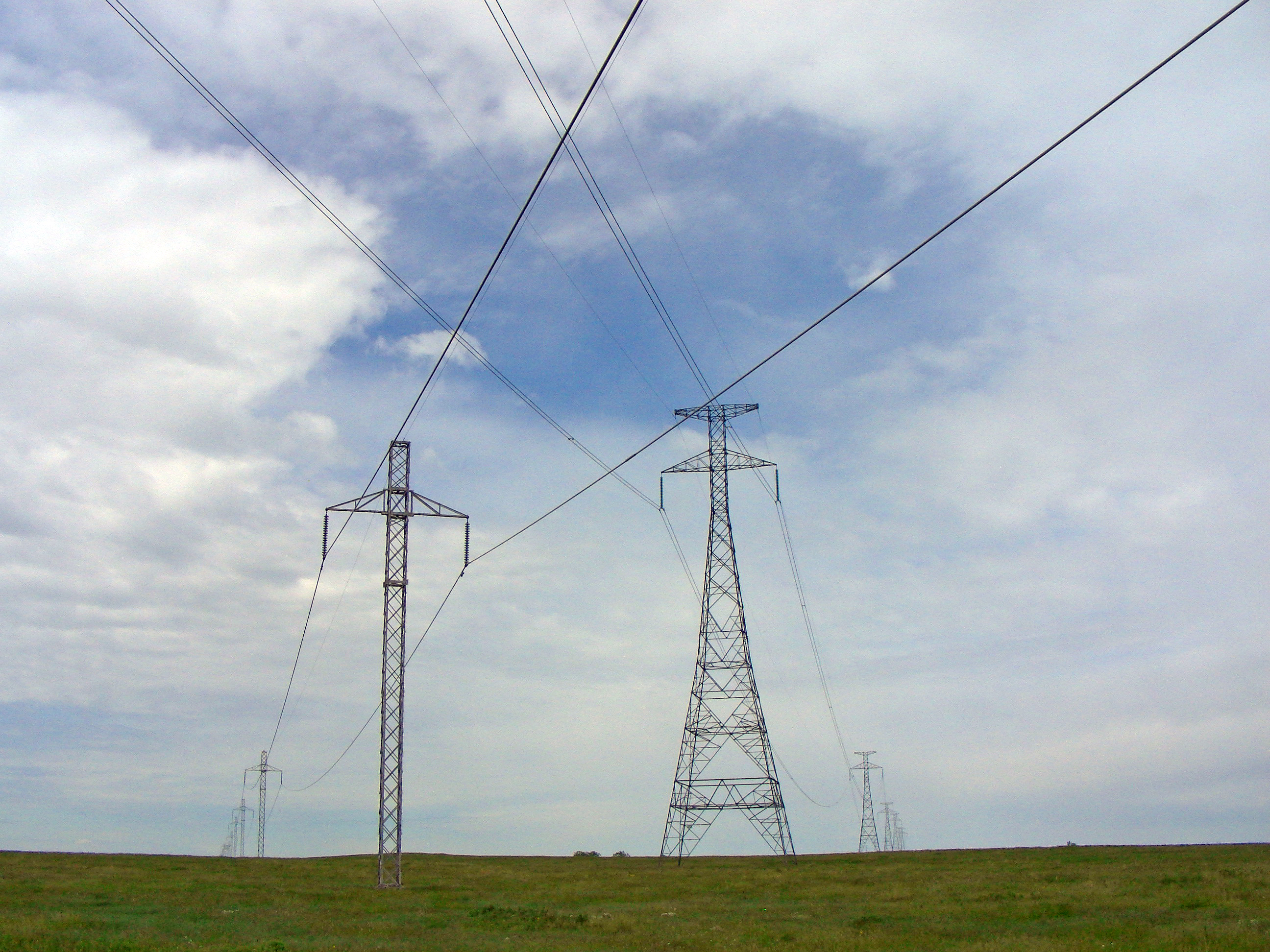
Two HVDC lines cross. Square Butte is the line of towers on the left. The CU tower line is on the right, with each of its two conductors formed of two sub-conductors in a horizontal configuration.

Southeast of Wing, North Dakota, at 47°02′48″N 100°05′49″W Square Butte crosses CU, another HVDC powerline. This is the only crossing point of two HVDC overhead powerlines in the Western hemisphere.

== Electrode line ==
The ground return electrode line starting at Adolph Static Inverter Plant is installed on portal pylons of the three phase AC-powerline from Adolph Static Inverter Plant to Marble Substation. It ends at 46°55′29″N 92°41′50″W. The electrode line starting at Adolph Static Inverter Plant consists of two underground 15 kV cables, each using aluminum conductors with a cross section of 380 mm^{2}.
