= Mizpah Lodge Building =

- U.S. National Register of Historic Places
- Location within North Dakota Location within the United States
- Location: 260 Front St., Sheldon, North Dakota
- Coordinates: 46°35′20″N 97°29′32″W
- Area: less than one acre
- Built: 1905
- NRHP reference No.: 05000913
- Added to NRHP: August 24, 2005

The Mizpah Lodge Building on Front St. in Sheldon, North Dakota was built in 1905. It has also been known as Mel's Country Grocery. It is a fraternal/commercial block building. It was listed on the National Register of Historic Places in 2005.

== History ==
The two-story brick building was built for Mizpah Lodge #39, a Masonic lodge chartered in 1893. It "was one of the masonic "blue" lodges, the common denominators of Masonry inasmuch as it was in such lodges that the initial three degrees - Entered Apprentice, Fellowcraft and Master Mason - were conferred on the candidate." The lodge had 11 charter members, and met in Sheldon's I.O.O.F hall and then in A.O.U.W. halls. It began construction of its own building in 1905 when membership had reached 54 and there were at least seven fraternal organizations in town, with scheduling of meeting times being an issue.

The building's second floor consisted of a main lodge hall, club room, kitchen, and club room lavatory. The first floor was occupied by a succession of commercial operations. Business types on the ground floor space included various retail enterprises including Mel's Country Grocery.
