= St. Mark's Church (Clark Mills, New York) =

Historic church in New York, United States

- U.S. National Register of Historic Places
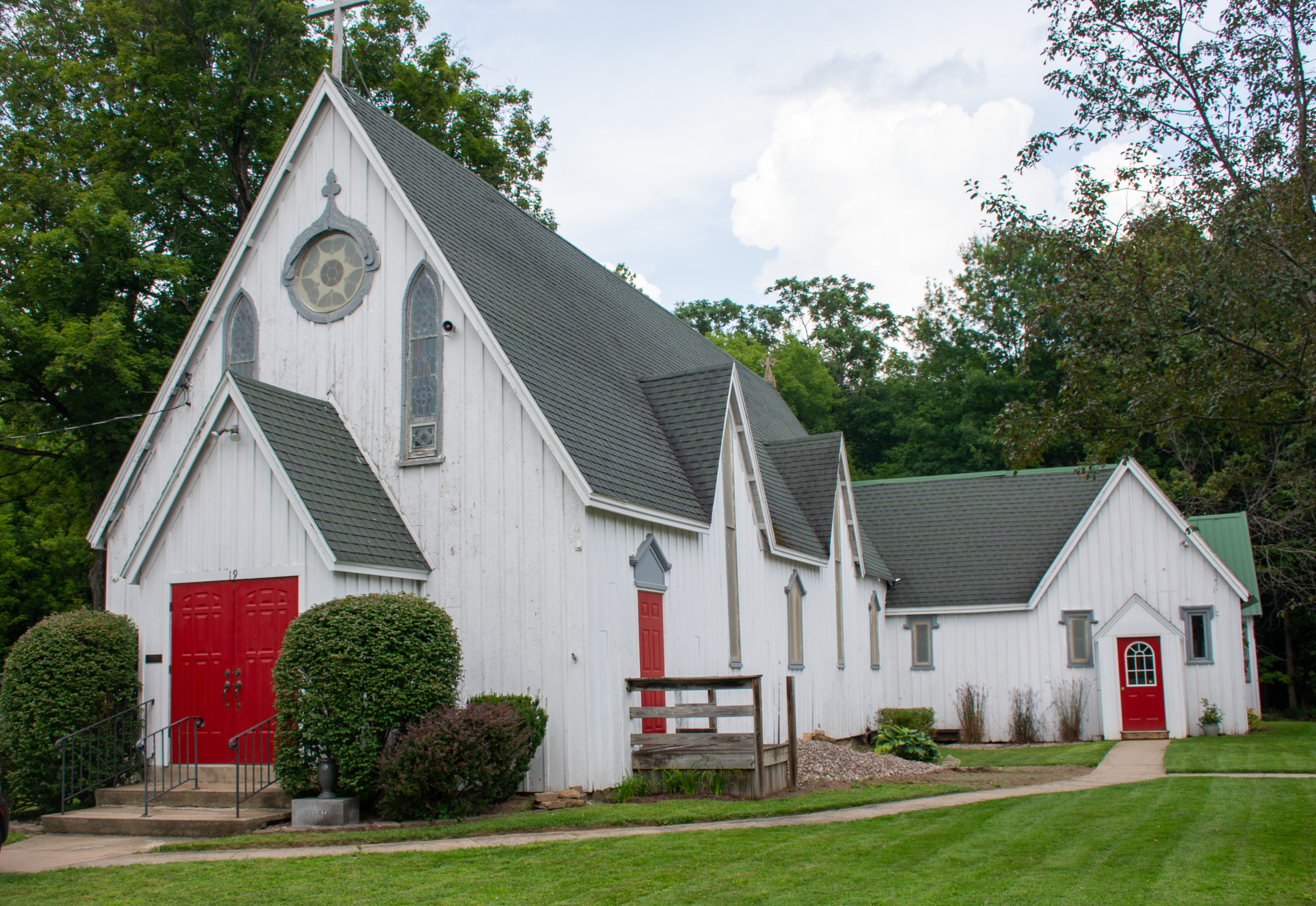

- Location within New York Location within the United States
- Location: 19 White St., Clark Mills, New York
- Coordinates: 43°5′25″N 75°22′47″W
- Area: less than one acre
- Built: 1863
- Architectural style: Gothic Revival
- MPS: Historic Churches of the Episcopal Diocese of Central New York MPS
- NRHP reference No.: 96000957
- Added to NRHP: August 30, 1996

St. Mark's Church is a parish of the Episcopal Church in the Diocese of Central New York, noted for its historic church at 19 White Street in Clark Mills, Oneida County, New York.

The community had been served by clergy from Westmoreland until villagers, the Clark Company (of the eponymous mills), and clergy raised funds to build the local church in 1863. The cornerstone was laid June 6, 1863 and the parish was legally organized on November 17.

The church is a board-and-batten Gothic Revival style structure. A one-story parish house was added to the south transept in 1895. It was listed on the National Register of Historic Places in 1996.
