= Clark Mills, New York =

- Census-designated place
- Location within New York Location within the United States
- Coordinates: 43°5′31″N 75°22′20″W
- Country: United States
- State: New York
- County: Oneida

Area
  - Total: 1.51 sq mi (3.91 km^{2})
  - Land: 1.49 sq mi (3.87 km^{2})
  - Water: 0.019 sq mi (0.05 km^{2})
- Elevation: 515 ft (157 m)

Population (2023)
  - Total: 1,606
  - Density: 1,373.1/sq mi (530.14/km^{2})
- Time zone: UTC-5 (Eastern (EST))
  - Summer (DST): UTC-4 (EDT)
- ZIP Codes: 13321 (Clark Mills); 13323 (Clinton); 13492 (Whitesboro)
- Area code: 315
- FIPS code: 36-15902
- GNIS feature ID: 0946769

Clark Mills is a hamlet (and census-designated place) in Oneida County, New York, United States. As of the 2020 census, Clark Mills had a population of 2,049.

The community is located at the northeastern corner of the Town of Kirkland, west of the City of Utica .

== History ==
The hamlet of Clark Mills, part of modern-day Town of Kirkland, is named for the Clark Mills Company, a textile mill on Oriskany Creek, and its founders: Ralph, Ammi, and Eneas Clark. The family business was established around 1845 and flourished for several years. In 1891 the company name changed to the Hind & Harrison Plush Co. and remained in operation until its closure in 1949.

St. Mark's Church was listed on the National Register of Historic Places in 1996.

On June 22, 2025, the hamlet was struck by a deadly high-end EF1 tornado. It downed dozens of trees, including some that fell on and heavily damaged homes. Three people were killed, which made this the second deadliest tornado in the state's history.

== Geography ==
Clark Mills is located at 43°5′31″N 75°22′20″W (43.091919, -75.372091).

According to the United States Census Bureau, the CDP has a total area of 1.0 square mile (2.6 km^{2}), of which 0.9 square miles (2.3 km^{2}) is land and 0.04 square miles (0.10 km^{2}) (3.12%) is water.

== Demographics ==
Historical population
Census	Pop.	Note	%±
2020	2,049		—
U.S. Decennial Census

=== 2020 census ===
As of the 2020 census, Clark Mills had a population of 2,049. The median age was 48.2 years. 16.3% of residents were under the age of 18 and 27.6% of residents were 65 years of age or older. For every 100 females there were 83.8 males, and for every 100 females age 18 and over there were 77.0 males age 18 and over.

98.4% of residents lived in urban areas, while 1.6% lived in rural areas.

There were 1,021 households in Clark Mills, of which 18.9% had children under the age of 18 living in them. Of all households, 34.9% were married-couple households, 22.7% were households with a male householder and no spouse or partner present, and 33.5% were households with a female householder and no spouse or partner present. About 42.2% of all households were made up of individuals and 22.7% had someone living alone who was 65 years of age or older.

There were 1,098 housing units, of which 7.0% were vacant. The homeowner vacancy rate was 2.8% and the rental vacancy rate was 4.1%.

Racial composition as of the 2020 census
Race	Number	Percent
White	1,878	91.7%
Black or African American	42	2.0%
American Indian and Alaska Native	5	0.2%
Asian	30	1.5%
Native Hawaiian and Other Pacific Islander	0	0.0%
Some other race	12	0.6%
Two or more races	82	4.0%
Hispanic or Latino (of any race)	46	2.2%

=== 2000 census ===
As of the census of 2000, there were 1,424 people, 628 households, and 381 families residing in the CDP. The population density was 1,534.0 inhabitants per square mile (592.3/km^{2}). There were 668 housing units at an average density of 719.6 per square mile (277.8/km^{2}). The racial makeup of the CDP was 98.53% White, 0.91% African American, 0.07% Native American, and 0.49% from two or more races. Hispanic or Latino of any race were 0.35% of the population.

There were 628 households, out of which 28.0% had children under the age of 18 living with them, 39.8% were married couples living together, 15.3% had a female householder with no husband present, and 39.3% were non-families. 32.6% of all households were made up of individuals, and 12.9% had someone living alone who was 65 years of age or older. The average household size was 2.25 and the average family size was 2.85.

In the CDP, the population was spread out, with 22.5% under the age of 18, 8.3% from 18 to 24, 29.3% from 25 to 44, 23.9% from 45 to 64, and 15.9% who were 65 years of age or older. The median age was 39 years. For every 100 females, there were 87.1 males. For every 100 females age 18 and over, there were 81.4 males.

The median income for a household in the CDP was $36,026, and the median income for a family was $45,833. Males had a median income of $32,036 versus $25,523 for females. The per capita income for the CDP was $18,101. About 3.6% of families and 6.9% of the population were below the poverty line, including 7.4% of those under age 18 and 2.7% of those age 65 or over.
