= Headwaters Incorporated =

American company

Headwaters Inc
- Company type: Public
- Traded as: NYSE: HW
- Industry: General Building Materials
- Founded: 1987
- Headquarters: South Jordan, Utah
- Key people: Kirk A. Benson, Chairman of the Board, CEO; Steven G. Stewart, Treasurer, CFO; Harlan M. Hatfield, Vice President, Secretary, General Counsel
- Products: Construction Materials, Coal Combustion Products, and Alternative Energy
- Revenue: $505.39 million USD (2006)
- Parent: Boral

Headwaters Inc provides products, technologies, and services to construction materials, coal combustion products, and alternative energy industries in the United States.

In 2016 it was announced that Headwaters Inc would be purchased by Sydney based Boral, another top producer of concrete and fly ash.
