= Spiritwood, North Dakota =

Spiritwood
- Census-designated place & Unincorporated community
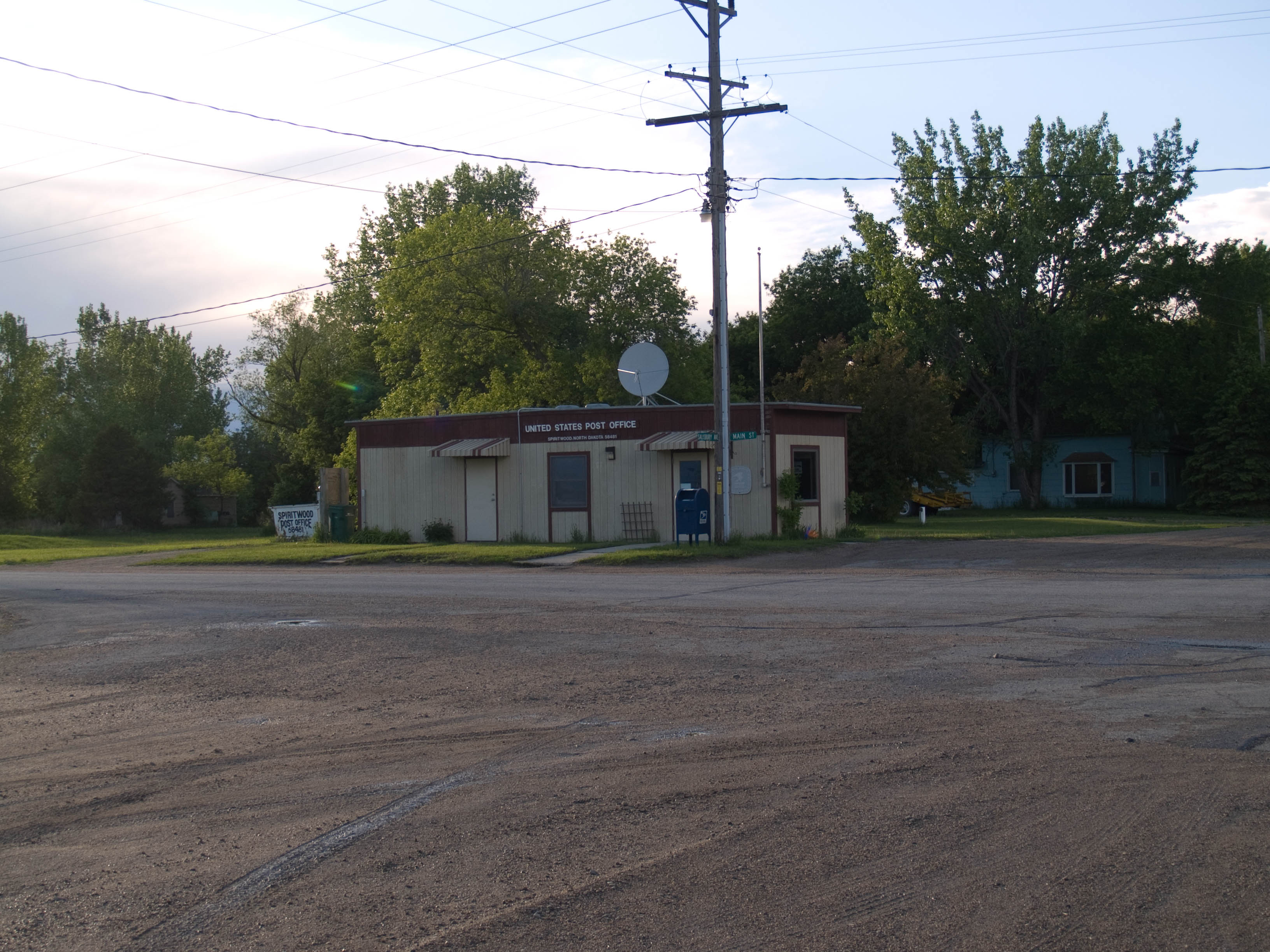
- US Post office in Spiritwood

- Location within the state of North Dakota Spiritwood (the United States)
- Coordinates: 46°56′03″N 98°29′36″W
- Country: United States
- State: North Dakota
- County: Stutsman

Area
  - Total: 0.88 sq mi (2.27 km^{2})
  - Land: 0.88 sq mi (2.27 km^{2})
  - Water: 0 sq mi (0.00 km^{2})
- Elevation: 1,480 ft (450 m)

Population (2020)
  - Total: 29
  - Density: 33.1/sq mi (12.79/km^{2})
- Time zone: UTC-6 (Central (CST))
  - Summer (DST): UTC-5 (CDT)
- ZIP codes: 58481
- Area code: 701
- FIPS code: 38-74660
- GNIS feature ID: 2584357

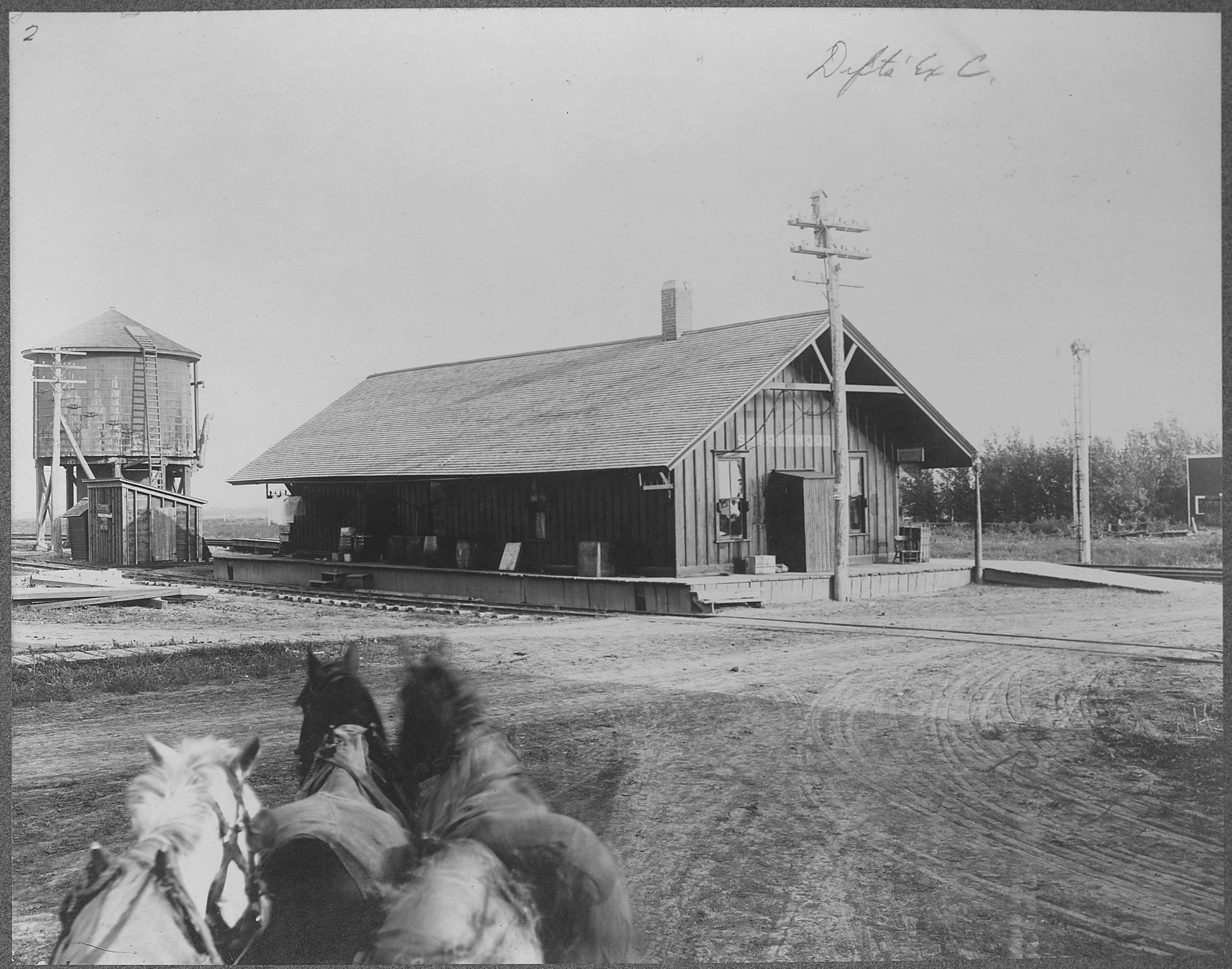
Spiritwood in 1925

Spiritwood is a census-designated place (CDP) in eastern Stutsman County, North Dakota, United States. An unincorporated community, it was designated as part of the U.S. Census Bureau's Participant Statistical Areas Program on March 31, 2010. It was not counted separately during the 2000 census, but was included in the 2010 census. As of the 2020 census, Spiritwood had a population of 29.

It lies east of the city of Jamestown, the county seat of Stutsman County. Although it is unincorporated community, it has a post office, with the ZIP code 58481.

A intense tornado on June 20, 2025 which would be part of a significant tornado outbreak that was also responsible for a EF5 tornado 2 hours later as the EF3 tornado as the Spiritwood tornado destroyed a farmhouse and a metal building at EF3 intensity.

== Demographics ==
Historical population
Census	Pop.	Note	%±
2020	29		—
U.S. Decennial Census

== Spiritwood Industrial Park ==
In 2007, ground was broken on a coal-fired cogeneration power plant, built by Great River Energy in Spiritwood Industrial Park. The industrial park, planned and funded the year before, was built coincidental to expansion of the nearby Cargill Malt plant and construction of the power/steam plant was predicated on a co-located ethanol plant. After construction was completed in 2011, the power plant was idled due to the recession, and need for a second steam partner (Cargill Malt being the first), after plans for the original ethanol plant fell through. In 2013, Great River Energy began construction on its own co-located ethanol plant, which would utilize the extra steam capacity of the power plant. The economic upturn and the promise of a second end-user for waste steam prompted the power plant to begin commercial operations in 2012. Construction of the ethanol plant was finished in July 2015. The construction of the ethanol plant was financed, in part, with a $75,000,000 EB-5 investment, managed by CMB Regional Centers. The ethanol plant began production in June 2015, and produced 65 million gallons of ethanol in its first year.
