= Coal Creek Station =

Power plant in North Dakota, U.S.

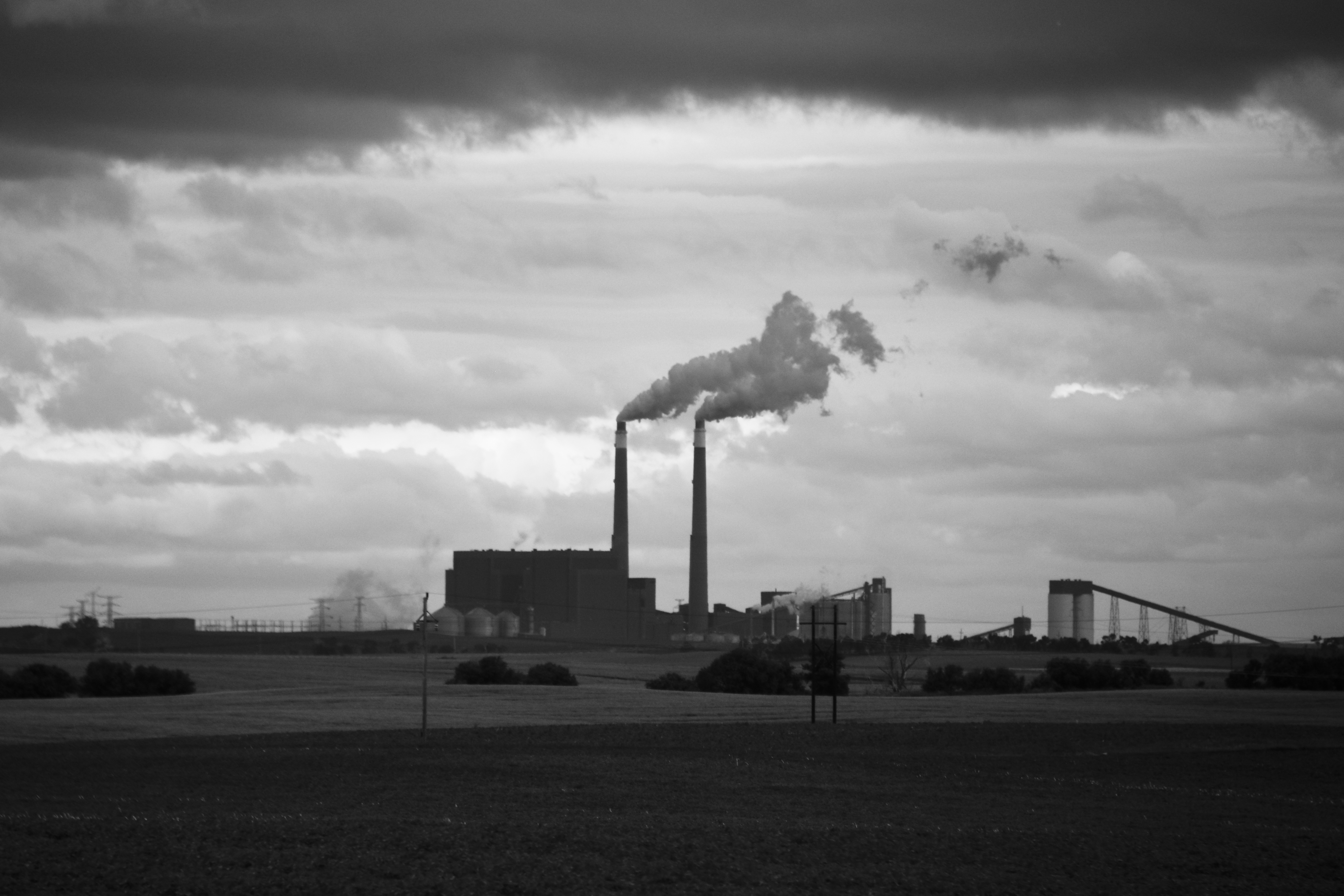
- Coal Creek Station in 2022
- Country: United States
- Location: McLean County, North Dakota
- Coordinates: 47°22′37″N 101°09′26″W
- Status: Operational
- Owner: Rainbow Energy Center LLC
- Operator: Rainbow Energy Center LLC

Thermal power station
- Primary fuel: Lignite

Power generation
- Nameplate capacity: 1,215.6 MW

Coal Creek Station is the largest power plant in the U.S. state of North Dakota. Located near the Missouri River between Underwood, North Dakota, and Washburn, North Dakota, it burns lignite. Its two generators are each rated at 605 megawatts (Unit 1 went in service in 1979, Unit 2 came online in 1980), with a peak total production of nearly 1.2 gigawatts. Great River Energy had announced its intention to close the plant in 2022 if a new owner could not be found. On June 30, 2021, Great River Energy announced that they had reached an agreement to sell the plant to Rainbow Energy Center, LLC, who plans to continue to operate the plant. On May 2, 2022 the sale of Coal Creek Station and the high voltage direct current (HVDC) transmission system was completed.

The boiler building of Coal Creek Station is 89.91 meters high. The chimney of Coal Creek Station is 198.12 metres tall. Coal Creek Station is the third-largest producer of coal ash in the country, generating over four million pounds of surface waste stored onsite each year.

== Public health ==
As of 2026, it is estimated that the plant causes 40 deaths per year due to soot and smog pollution.

== Waste heat utilization ==
Coal Creek Station was the testing site for Great River Energy's Lignite Enhancement System. Their project, “DryFining,” created a new technology for coal-firing power plants that improves fuel quality, decreases volatile gas emissions, and reduces a plant’s operating expenses and maintenance costs. The Great River Energy team also included fluid bed dryer engineer Heyl & Patterson Inc. of Pittsburgh, Pennsylvania, the U.S. Department of Energy’s National Energy Technology Laboratory, Lehigh University’s Energy Research Center, the Electric Power Research Institute and engineering construction contractor WorleyParsons. The team was awarded with Power Engineering magazine’s 2010 Coal-Fired Project of the Year.

Some of the waste heat generated by the coal combustion is also utilized by the nearby Blue Flint Ethanol plant.
