= Sheldon, North Dakota =

- City
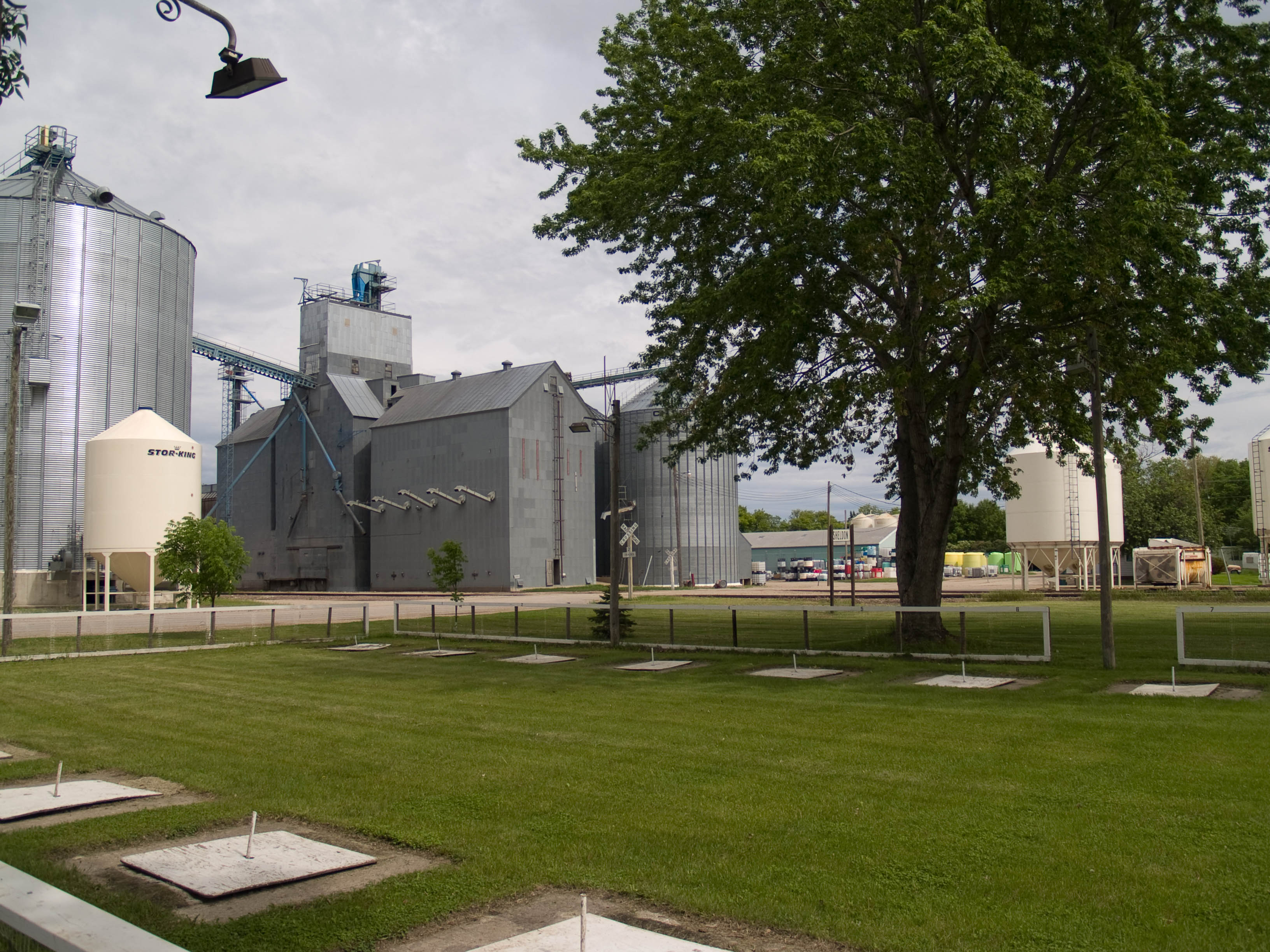

- Location of Sheldon, North Dakota
- Coordinates: 46°35′18″N 97°29′40″W
- Country: United States
- State: North Dakota
- County: Ransom

Area
  - Total: 0.41 sq mi (1.06 km^{2})
  - Land: 0.41 sq mi (1.06 km^{2})
  - Water: 0 sq mi (0.00 km^{2})
- Elevation: 1,076 ft (328 m)

Population (2020)
  - Total: 95
  - Estimate (2022): 93
  - Density: 232.6/sq mi (89.79/km^{2})
- Time zone: UTC-6 (Central (CST))
  - Summer (DST): UTC-5 (CDT)
- ZIP code: 58068
- Area code: 701
- FIPS code: 38-72180
- GNIS feature ID: 1036260

Sheldon is a city in Ransom County, North Dakota, United States. The population was 95 at the 2020 census. Sheldon was founded in 1882.

== History ==
The city is named after an early landowner. In 1905, the Masonic Mizpah Lodge Building was built. In 1906, a controversial artesian well was drilled in the community.

== Geography ==
According to the United States Census Bureau, the city has a total area of 0.22 square miles (0.57 km^{2}), all of it land.

The community is located at the junction of County Roads 136 and 3727, southeast of Enderlin.

== Demographics ==
Historical population
Census	Pop.	Note	%±
1890	258		—
1900	318		23.3%
1910	358		12.6%
1920	321		−10.3%
1930	327		1.9%
1940	281		−14.1%
1950	267		−5.0%
1960	221		−17.2%
1970	192		−13.1%
1980	173		−9.9%
1990	149		−13.9%
2000	135		−9.4%
2010	116		−14.1%
2020	95		−18.1%
2022 (est.)	93		−2.1%
U.S. Decennial Census; 2020 Census

=== 2010 census ===
As of the census of 2010, there were 116 people, 50 households, and 34 families residing in the city. The population density was 527.3 inhabitants per square mile (203.6/km^{2}). There were 61 housing units at an average density of 277.3 per square mile (107.1/km^{2}). The racial makeup of the city was 94.8% White, 1.7% Native American, and 3.4% from two or more races.

There were 50 households, of which 28.0% had children under the age of 18 living with them, 64.0% were married couples living together, 4.0% had a female householder with no husband present, and 32.0% were non-families. 28.0% of all households were made up of individuals, and 6% had someone living alone who was 65 years of age or older. The average household size was 2.32 and the average family size was 2.88.

The median age in the city was 42.7 years. 23.3% of residents were under the age of 18; 4.2% were between the ages of 18 and 24; 26.8% were from 25 to 44; 27.6% were from 45 to 64; and 18.1% were 65 years of age or older. The gender makeup of the city was 51.7% male and 48.3% female.

=== 2000 census ===
As of the census of 2000, there were 135 people, 62 households, and 30 families residing in the city. The population density was 680.8 inhabitants per square mile (262.9/km^{2}). There were 71 housing units at an average density of 358.0 per square mile (138.2/km^{2}). The racial makeup of the city was 94.07% White, 2.96% Native American, 1.48% from other races, and 1.48% from two or more races.

There were 62 households, out of which 24.2% had children under the age of 18 living with them, 37.1% were married couples living together, 6.5% had a female householder with no husband present, and 51.6% were non-families. 48.4% of all households were made up of individuals, and 24.2% had someone living alone who was 65 years of age or older. The average household size was 2.18 and the average family size was 3.27.

In the city, the population was spread out, with 27.4% under the age of 18, 5.9% from 18 to 24, 28.1% from 25 to 44, 20.0% from 45 to 64, and 18.5% who were 65 years of age or older. The median age was 36 years. For every 100 females, there were 125.0 males. For every 100 females age 18 and over, there were 104.2 males.

The median income for a household in the city was $25,625, and the median income for a family was $50,250. Males had a median income of $28,125 versus $21,250 for females. The per capita income for the city was $14,671. There were 6.5% of families and 16.8% of the population living below the poverty line, including 20.5% of under eighteens and 32.1% of those over 64.

== Notable people ==
- Thomas McGrath, poet and educator
- Lynn Nelson, Major League Baseball pitcher
