= Great River Energy =

Electric transmission and generation cooperative

Coordinates: 45.094276°N 93.436164°W

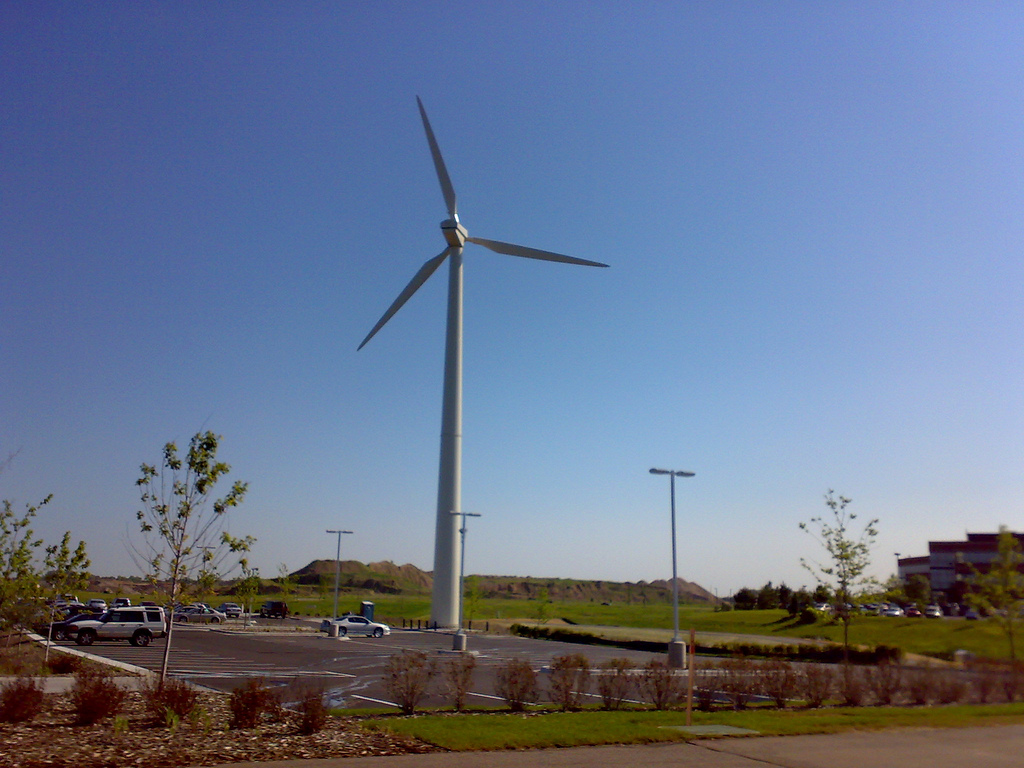
The NEG Micon M700 wind turbine at the Great River Energy headquarters in Maple Grove

Great River Energy is an electric transmission and generation cooperative in the U.S. state of Minnesota; it is the state's second largest electric utility, based on generating capacity, and the fifth largest generation and transmission cooperative in the U.S. in terms of assets. Great River Energy was formed in 1999 through the merger of Cooperative Power Association and United Power Association.

Great River Energy owns or co-owns more than 100 energy transmission substations in the region. The company's system also includes more than 500 distribution substations. Great River Energy is a not-for-profit cooperative that provides wholesale electricity to more than 1.7 million people through 26 member distribution cooperatives in Minnesota, covering roughly 60 percent of the state. The company also owns transmission lines in North Dakota and Wisconsin.

== Company headquarters ==
Great River Energy's headquarters are located in Maple Grove, Minnesota. The facility includes a 160-foot-tall (49 m), 200 kilowatt NEG Micon M700 wind turbine (visible from Interstate 94), and a 250-kilowatt solar array at ground level and on the rooftop. The building uses approximately half the energy of similar-sized buildings constructed using standard construction techniques, 40 percent less electricity for lighting and 90 percent less water than standard corporate campuses. The company has occupied the Maple Grove facility since April 2008. In October 2008, the headquarters building became the first building in Minnesota to attain LEED Platinum certification.

== Transmission operations ==
Great River Energy’s transmission system is part of an overall regional transmission grid, operated on a coordinated basis in accordance with the Minnesota Electric Transmission Planning group. Regional grid operations were expanded in 2002 with the formation of the MISO, an independent, nonprofit organization that supports the reliable operation of the transmission system in 15 U.S. states and the Canadian province of Manitoba. MISO acts as the Regional Transmission Organization, overseeing the operations, planning, and improvements of the wholesale bulk electric transmission system in the upper Midwest. With its administration of a centralized energy market, Midwest ISO's stated goal is to ensure that the growing demand for power is served in an efficient and effective manner.

== Grid North Partners (Formerly known as CapX2020 project) ==
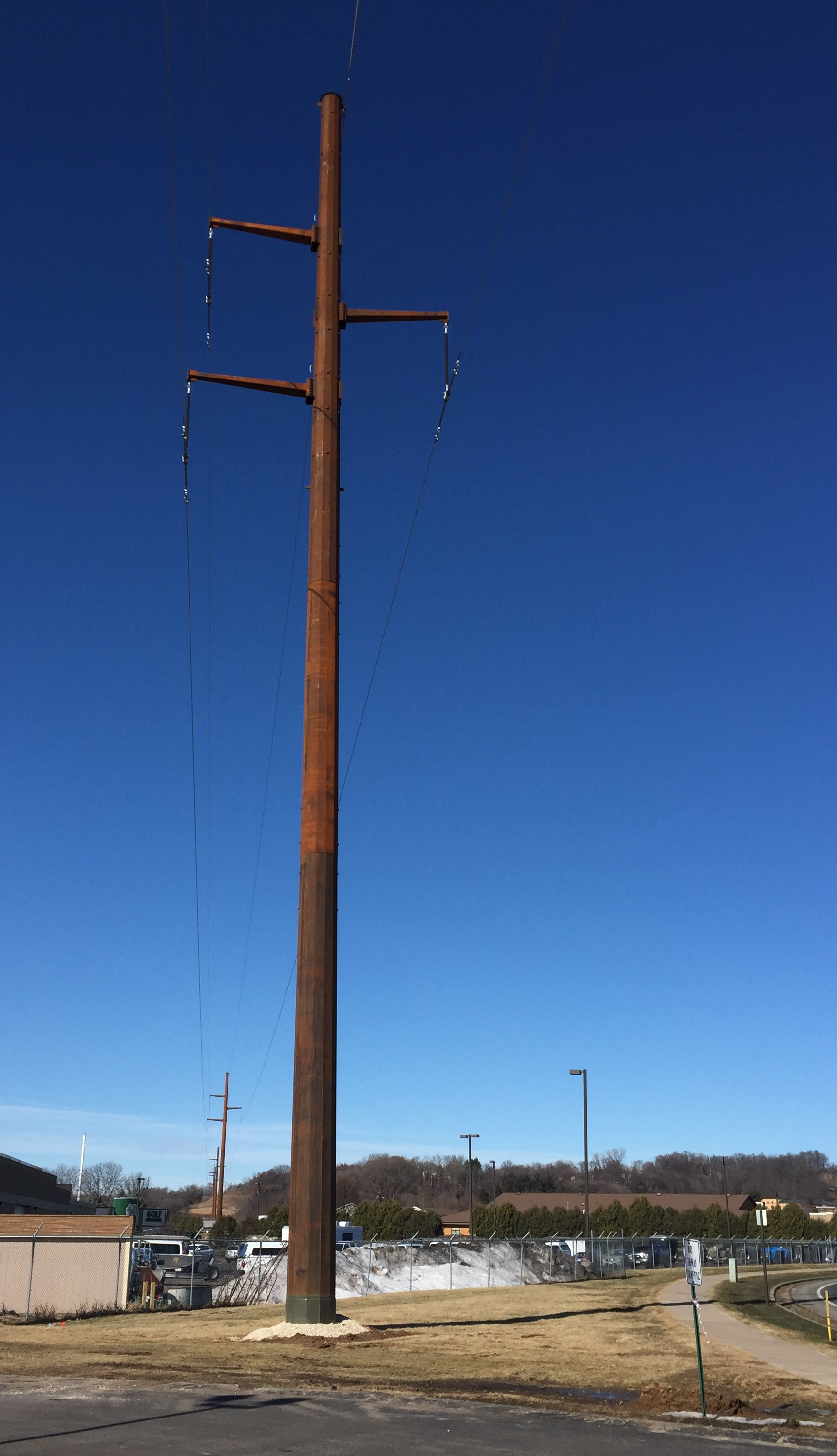
CapX 2020 power line in Onalaska, Wisconsin

Great River Energy is part of Grid North Partners, a broad mix of 10 investor-owned and not-for-profit cooperative and municipal utilities owning and operating transmission infrastructure in the Upper Midwest.

== Electric plants ==
- Spiritwood Station – Located near Spiritwood, North Dakota was completed in 2012. Went commercial on 11-1-2014. It is a combined heat and power plant which produces steam for sale to local industries and electricity.
- Cambridge Station – Located in Cambridge, Minnesota
- Lakefield Junction Station – Located in Trimont, Minnesota
- Pleasant Valley Station – Located in Dexter, Minnesota
- Elk River Peaking Station – Located in Elk River, Minnesota

=== Wind ===
- Great River Energy also purchases over 950 megawatts of wind energy from wind farms in Minnesota, Iowa and North Dakota.

=== Solar ===
- Great River Energy has 650 kilowatts of solar energy installations, including a 250 kW solar array at its Maple Grove, Minn. headquarters facility. The array includes a mix of technologies to help determine how solar energy installations can be integrated into cooperative systems.

=== Purchases ===
When needed, Great River Energy also purchases electricity from other electric producers through its membership in the Midwest Independent Transmission System Operator, known as the Midcontinent Independent System Operator. Purchase contracts limits local distributors (Great River Energy's customers) to a 5% maximum of self-generation.

== Management and governance ==
The board of directors for Great River Energy is composed of representatives selected by the board of directors of each of its 26 distribution cooperative members.

== See also ==
- Wind power in the United States
