= List of North American tornadoes and tornado outbreaks =

Tornadoes in the United States 1950–2019

These are some notable tornadoes, tornado outbreaks, and tornado outbreak sequences that have occurred in North America.

1. The listing is U.S.-centric, with greater and more consistent information available for U.S. tornadoes. Some North American outbreaks affecting the U.S. may only include tornado information from the U.S.
2. Exact death and injury counts are not possible, especially for large events and events before 1950.
3. Prior to 1950 in the United States, only significant tornadoes (rated F2 or higher or causing a fatality) are listed for the number of tornadoes in outbreaks. These ratings are estimates from tornado expert Tom Grazulis and are not official.
4. Due to increasing detection, particularly in the U.S., numbers of counted tornadoes have increased markedly in recent decades although number of actual tornadoes and counted significant tornadoes has not. In older events, the number of tornadoes officially counted is likely underestimated.
5. Historical context: Much of the tornado activity in the American Midwestern area is relatively unknown and significantly under-reported prior to the middle of the 1800s as few people lived there to record the yearly activity. The American government did not acquire the territory that would become the Midwestern states until the 1803 Louisiana Purchase from the French government. The Louisiana Purchase area included major tornado activity areas of north Texas, Oklahoma, Kansas, Nebraska, Arkansas, Missouri, Iowa, South Dakota, and lower Minnesota. Large groups of settlers and pioneers only began populating the region after 1820. As these areas began being more populated, existing tornado activity there became more known and reported through newspaper and telegraph.

Where applicable, a count of the number of significant (F2/EF2 and stronger), violent (F4/EF4 and stronger), and killer tornadoes is included for outbreaks.

== United States ==
=== 1643–1859 ===
List of United States tornado outbreaks – Pre-1900
Outbreak	Dates	Region	Tornadoes	Casualties	Notes
Essex County, Massachusetts–Hampton, New Hampshire tornado	July 5, 1643	Essex County, Massachusetts, Hampton, New Hampshire	-	1 fatality	Potential earliest recorded U.S. tornado and fatality. Event was recorded by Massachusetts Bay Colony governor John Winthrop. "There arose a sudden gust at N.W. so violent for half an hour as it blew down multitudes of trees. It lifted up their meeting house at Newbury, the people being in it. It darkened the air with dust, yet through God's great mercy it did no hurt, but only killed one Indian with the fall of a tree. It was straight between Linne [Lynn] and Hampton."
Rehoboth, Massachusetts tornado	August 1671	Massachusetts	-	0 fatalities	Earliest confirmed U.S. tornado.
Cambridge, Massachusetts tornado	July 8, 1680	Massachusetts	-	1 fatality	Earliest confirmed U.S. tornado with a fatality.
1761 Charleston, South Carolina tornado	May 4, 1761	Charleston, South Carolina	>2	8 fatalities	Earliest recorded U.S. tornado with multiple fatalities. A large tornado temporarily emptied the Ashley River and sank five warships lying offshore
Four-State Tornado Swarm	August 15, 1787	New England	≥5	2 fatalities	First recorded U.S. tornado outbreak.
1811 Charleston, South Carolina tornado	September 10, 1811	Charleston, South Carolina	-	20 fatalities	Associated with the 1811 hurricane that hit Charleston, SC.
1814 Washington, D.C. tornado	August 25, 1814	Washington, D.C.	-	c. 30 fatalities	Killed several British soldiers occupying the city. The British subsequently abandoned the city.
September 1821 New England tornado outbreak	Sep 9, 1821	New England	>5	8 fatalities	One of the most destructive New England outbreaks ever documented. Produced a deadly multiple-vortex tornado in New Hampshire.
1835 Middlesex County tornado	June 19, 1835	Mid-Atlantic	-	5 fatalities	Deadliest tornado in New Jersey history.
Great Natchez Tornado	May 7, 1840	Southeastern United States	>1	317+ fatalities, 109+ injuries	Second-deadliest tornado in U.S. history
September 1845 New York outbreak	September 20, 1845	New York, Vermont	>5	–	Multiple long-track tornadoes crossed upstate New York
August 1851 Waltham, Medford, and West Cambridge tornado	August 22, 1851	Waltham, Medford, West Cambridge Massachusetts	1	-	The center of Arlington, MA was devastated by a strong tornado.
1855 Des Plaines tornado	May 22, 1855	Illinois	-	4 fatalities, 8 injuries	First recorded tornado in Illinois history, which occurred in present-day Des Plaines, Illinois. Erroneously thought for a long time to have taken place in Jefferson Township, before research corrected the tornado's location.

=== 1860s ===
List of United States tornado outbreaks – 1860s
Outbreak	Dates	Region	Tornadoes	Casualties	Notes
June 1860 Mid-Mississippi Valley tornado outbreak	June 3, 1860	Middle Mississippi Valley	–	≥148 fatalities, ≥409 injuries	Very violent outbreak. Produced a deadly tornado or tornado family that struck Camanche, Iowa. (7 violent, 6 killer)
1865 Viroqua tornado	June 28, 1865	Viroqua, Wisconsin	>1	≥22 fatalities	One of Wisconsin's first killer tornadoes. Also one of the first documentations of a multiple-vortex tornado.
Rock Island, Illinois tornado	March 16, 1868	Rock Island, Illinois	–	1 fatality, 3 injuries	An apparent tornado severely damaged a bridge on the Mississippi River.

=== 1870s ===
List of United States tornado outbreaks – Pre-1900
Outbreak	Dates	Region	Tornadoes	Casualties	Notes
1871 St. Louis tornado	March 8, 1871	Middle Mississippi Valley	≥1	9 fatalities, 60 injuries	Estimated F3 tornado killed nine people in St. Louis.
May 1873 Midwest tornado outbreak	May 22, 1873	Midwestern United States	≥7	18 fatalities, ≥ 93 injuries	At least three tornadoes recorded
November 1874 Southeast tornado outbreak	November 22, 1874	Alabama	≥2	16 fatalities, ≥ 50 injuries	An F4 tornado damaged or destroyed about a third of Tuscumbia, Alabama, killing 12 people in town and at least 2 others in nearby rural areas. An F3 tornado damaged or destroyed about half the buildings in Montevallo, Alabama, killing two others.
March 1875 Southeast tornado outbreak	March 19–20, 1875	Southeastern United States	≥19	≥96 fatalities, ≥367 injuries	Outbreak produced seven estimated F4 tornadoes. The worst of the damage and most of the fatalities took place in Georgia. (15 significant, 7 violent, 12 killer)
May 1875 Southeast tornado outbreak	May 1, 1875	Southeastern United States	–	58 fatalities, 195 injuries	Included several long-tracked, (estimated) F3 tornado families. (1 violent, 7 killer)
1878 Wallingford tornado	August 9, 1878	Connecticut	–	34 fatalities, ≥70 injuries	Deadliest tornado in Connecticut history. Estimated to have been an F4.
May 1879 Central Plains tornado outbreak	May 29–30, 1879	Central Great Plains	–	≥36 fatalities, ≥186 injuries	(≥15 significant, 6 violent, ≥9 killer)

=== 1880s ===
List of United States tornado outbreaks – Pre-1900
Outbreak	Dates	Region	Tornadoes	Casualties	Notes
Tornado outbreak of April 1880	April 18, 1880	Mississippi Valley – Great Plains	≥ 27	≥167 fatalities, ≥516 injuries	99 people killed in and near Springfield and Marshfield, Missouri. Three long-tracked F4s in Missouri. (24 significant, 5 violent, 16 killer)
1880 West Prairie–Christian County tornado	April 24, 1880	West Prairie – Christian County, Illinois	1	6 fatalities	Many "well built" homes were leveled and farms vanished. Its victims (both people and cattle) were reportedly carried up to half a mile. This is the earliest estimated F5 that can be verified in the U.S. according to Grazulis. (The 1953 Waco tornado is the earliest officially rated - see below.) The F5 rating is widely accepted.
Tornado outbreak of June 1881	June 12, 1881	Great Plains – Midwest	7	15 fatalities, 112 injuries	Produced five violent tornadoes across three states, one of which was an F4 that destroyed the community of Floral, Kansas. Another F4 that hit near Hopkins, Missouri, may have been an F5. (7 significant, 5 violent, 4 killer)
1881 Minnesota tornado outbreak	July 15–16, 1881	Minnesota	≥ 6	24 fatalities, ≥123 injuries	Produced a destructive F4 (possibly F5) tornado in New Ulm, Minnesota, along with other killer tornadoes in rural areas, including one that killed four people. (6 significant, 2 violent, 2 killer)
1882 Grinnell tornado	June 17, 1882	Grinnell, Iowa	1	65 fatalities	16 farms were blown away and the town of Grinnell was devastated, as well as the Grinnell College campus. Debris was carried 100 mi (160 km). Estimated F5. Caused 68 fatalities according to Grazulis.
Tornado outbreak of April 21–23, 1883	April 21–23, 1883	Southeastern United States	≥ 29	≥122 fatalities, ≥771 injuries	Produced several killer F3+ tornadoes in Iowa, Mississippi, and Georgia. (20 significant, 4 violent, 17 killer)
Tornado outbreak of May 1883	May 18, 1883	Middle-Lower Mississippi Valley	–	≥64 fatalities, ≥386 injuries	One of the most intense outbreaks ever to hit Illinois, where five F4s struck. (≥21 significant, 6 violent, 16 killer)
1883 Rochester tornado	August 21, 1883	Rochester, Minnesota	1	37 fatalities, 200+ injured	Estimated F5 tornado led to the formation of the Mayo Clinic.
Enigma tornado outbreak	February 19–20, 1884	Central – Eastern United States	> 51	>178 fatalities, ≥1056 injuries	Among largest known outbreaks ever recorded. Produced violent and killer tornadoes across a large portion of the Southeastern United States, killing well over 170 people. Long-track F4 tornado moved through Alabama and Georgia, killing 30 people. Another F4—the deadliest in North Carolina history—hit Rockingham, North Carolina, and killed 23. (≥37 significant, 4 violent, ≥27 killer)
Tornado outbreak of March 1884	March 24–25, 1884	Southeastern United States – Ohio Valley	> 29	32 fatalities	(29 significant, 11 killer)
1884 Oakville tornado	April 1, 1884	Oakville, Indiana	1	8 fatalities	Among contemporary meteorologists, this was considered one of the most intense tornadoes observed up to that time. Parts of Oakville "vanished," with house debris scattered for miles. Estimated F5.
1884 Howard tornado	August 28, 1884	Dakota Territory (now South Dakota)	≥ 6	≥7 fatalities ≥2 injuries	One of the oldest known tornado photographs.
Tornado outbreak of April 1885	April 1885	Texas	-	60 fatalities 4 injuries	One tornado struck Waco.
1885 Philadelphia/Camden tornado	August 3, 1885	Philadelphia, Pennsylvania – Camden, New Jersey	-	≥7 fatalities ≥8-10 injuries	An estimated F3 tornado devastated Philadelphia and its New Jersey suburb of Camden. A ferry boat and steamboat on the Delaware River were damaged and numerous homes, factories, shops, and other buildings were damaged or destroyed. At least 200 were left homeless by the storm.
1886 St. Cloud–Sauk Rapids tornado outbreak	April 14, 1886	Central Minnesota	≥ 18	≥87 fatalities, ≥324 injuries	The St. Cloud-Sauk Rapids tornado remains the deadliest tornado in Minnesota history. Estimated to have been an F4. Other tornadoes were reported in Iowa, Kansas, Missouri and Texas.
1887 Grand Forks tornado	June 16, 1887	Grand Forks North Dakota	-		At the time, Fargo, North Dakota was believed to be the northern limit of potential tornado activity by the United States Signal Service. Grand Forks is located another 75 miles north of Fargo in North Dakota. The tornado there led to a rethinking of the potential northern boundary of tornado activity in the United States at the time.

=== 1890s ===
List of United States tornado outbreaks – Pre-1900
Outbreak	Dates	Region	Tornadoes	Casualties	Notes
1890 St. Louis tornado outbreak	January 12, 1890	Middle Mississippi Valley	–	16 fatalities, 91 injuries	(≥1 violent, 3 killer)
Tornado outbreak of March 27, 1890	March 27, 1890	Middle Mississippi Valley	≥24	≥146 fatalities, ≥847 injuries	Deadly tornado outbreak killed at least 146 people across the Midwest. An F4 that struck downtown Louisville killed 76 people alone. Four other F4s, including a long-tracked tornado family that killed 21 people in southern Indiana and northern Kentucky. (≥24 significant, 6 violent, 16 killer)
1890 Lawrence tornado	July 26, 1890	Lawrence, Massachusetts	–	8 fatalities, 63 injuries	Touched down shortly after 9 am, estimated F3 strength. Path 11 mi (18 km) long through the city.
1890 Wilkes-Barre tornado	August 19, 1890	Wilkes-Barre, Pennsylvania	1	16 fatalities, 50 injuries	It is believed that the tornado touched down west of Nanticoke as an estimated F0. The storm intensified as it traveled northeast towards the City of Wilkes-Barre. After 5:00 pm, it tore through the heart of Wilkes-Barre as an estimated F3. The tornado killed 16 people, injured 50, damaged or destroyed 260 buildings, and cost at least $240,000 (in 1890 USD). The tornado then traveled east and ended in a heavily wooded region just outside the city.
1891 Missouri tornado	May 20, 1891	Missouri	1	3-12 fatalities	The tornado was first reported touching down near Sturgeon before moving eastward where it struck several homes. One house was completely leveled with no survivors. The storm continued on where it struck another house killing all of its occupants and then later struck a jail and several farms resulting in eleven more fatalities before continuing eastward before dissipating. During its 35 miles (56 km) path, the storm left up to twelve fatalities and $15,000 (1891 USD) in damage.
Southern Minnesota tornadoes of June 15, 1892	June 15, 1892	Minnesota	3	12 fatalities, 76 injuries	Yielded an estimated F5 tornado that obliterated entire farms. (3 significant, 1 violent, 3 killer)
1893 Willow Springs tornado	May 22, 1893	Willow Springs, Wisconsin	–	3 fatalities	Two farm complexes were completely swept away. Estimated to be an F5.
1893 Pomeroy tornado	July 6, 1893	Pomeroy, Iowa	–	71 fatalities	Grass was scoured from the ground, and a metal bridge was torn from its supports. A well pump and 40 feet (12 m) of pipe were pulled out of the ground. Estimated to be an F5.
1894 Upper Mississippi Valley tornado outbreak	September 21–22, 1894	Upper Mississippi Valley	–	>63 fatalities, >253 injuries	Included a long-tracked F4 tornado family in Wisconsin and Iowa. In Kossuth County Iowa (five farms and a home were swept away, leaving little trace) and Wisconsin. (>9 significant, 4 violent, 5 killer)
1895 Kansas-Iowa tornado outbreak	May 1–3, 1895	Central-Northern Great Plains	–	>18–35 fatalities, >67 injuries	Seven people killed in schools in Ireton-Hull, Iowa. In Harvey County Kansas on May 1, an estimated F5 hit where farms "entirely vanished," with debris carried for miles. In Sioux County Iowa on May 3, an estimated F5 hit where farms "entirely vanished," with debris carried for miles. (2 F5s, 3 killer)
1895 Queens tornado	July 13, 1895	Queens, New York	–	1 fatality	Forty others were injured, seven homes were demolished and at least 25 others damaged, and monuments and tombstones in Cypress Hills and Bayside cemeteries were uprooted by a cyclone that touched down near Cypress Hills and moved through the neighborhoods of Woodhaven, Union Course, and Ozone Park.
Tornado outbreak sequence of May 1896	May 24–28, 1896	Central and Eastern United States, Canada (Ontario)	≥ 26	≥ 388 fatalities, ≥ 1,490 injuries	The deadliest tornado outbreak sequence in American history. Killer tornadoes touched down from Iowa to Pennsylvania. Produced an F5 and several F4s, including an F4 that killed at least 255 people and injured 1,000 in Greater St. Louis. (25 significant, 7 violent, 15 killer)
Fort Smith, Arkansas, tornadoes of January 11, 1898	January 11, 1898	Lower Mississippi Valley	≥ 5	≥56 fatalities, ≥119 injuries	Devastating F4 tornado struck Fort Smith. (3 significant, 1 violent, 2 killer)
May 1898 Mississippi Valley tornado outbreaks	May 17–18, 1898	Middle-Upper Mississippi Valley	–	55 fatalities, ≥380 injuries	In Salix, Iowa, on June 11, an estimated F5 tornado struck and impacted several farms. In Marathon County, Wisconsin, on May 18, an estimated F5 tornado flattened 12 farms. (5 violent, 10 killer)
1899 New Richmond tornado	June 11–12, 1899	Upper Midwest	1	≥117 fatalities, ≥203 injuries	Devastating (estimated) F5 destroyed the town of New Richmond, Wisconsin. Deadliest Wisconsin tornado on record, ninth deadliest in US history.

=== 1900s ===
List of United States tornado outbreaks – 1900–1909
Outbreak	Dates	Region	Tornadoes	Casualties	Notes
1900 Plains tornado outbreak	May 5–6, 1900	Nebraska-Texas-Missouri	–	≥3 fatalities, ≥16 injuries	May 6 named "day of the cyclones" by the press. (≥19 significant, 2 killer)
Tornado outbreak of November 20–21, 1900	November 20–21, 1900	Southeastern United States	–	≥97 fatalities, >388 injuries	The deadliest November tornado outbreak to date in United States history killed at least 97 people across the Southeastern United States. A long-lived family of tornadoes, the strongest of which was rated F4, killed at least 42 people in Mississippi and Tennessee, including 11 near Strayhorn, Mississippi, and 15 on plantations in Tunica County, Mississippi. Another F4 tornado devastated the west side of Columbia, Tennessee, killing 27 people. (12 significant, 2 violent, 7 killer)
1902 Goliad, Texas tornado	May 18, 1902	South Central U.S.	–	114 fatalities, ≥279 injuries	Tied with the Waco tornado as deadliest in Texas history. Estimated F4 tornado.
1902 Trenton, New Jersey Cyclone	August 10, 1902	Trenton, New Jersey	–	2 injuries	A destructive tornado, estimated to have been at F1 or F2 strength, tore through Trenton, New Jersey, on a 2.5 mi (4.0 km) path. Walls or roofs were torn off of 100 homes and wagons and outhouses were tossed like toys. Heavy rain in the city also collapsed a bridge. Due to limited knowledge of tornadoes at the time, the tornado was considered to be a "cyclone."
1904 Moundville, Alabama tornado	January 22, 1904	Hale/Tuscaloosa Counties, Alabama	1	36 fatalities, 150 injuries	A violent F4 tornado struck Moundville, Alabama, just after midnight, destroying all but one store in the business district along with a number of homes, railroad depots, freight cars, farm buildings and a hotel. Damage was also reported northeast of Moundville in the towns of Hull, Phifer, Maxwell, and Tidewater.
1904 Chappaqua tornado	July 16, 1904	New York	1	2 fatalities, 6 injuries	An estimated F3 tornado struck upstate New York.
1904 St. Louis tornado	August 19, 1904	Missouri-Illinois	1	3 fatalities, ≥10 injuries	Heavy damage in downtown St. Louis.
1904 Upper Midwest tornado outbreak	August 20, 1904	Minnesota-South Dakota-Wisconsin	≥8	14 fatalities, ≥100 injuries	Severe damage throughout the Twin Cities.
1905 Snyder, Oklahoma tornado	May 10, 1905	Oklahoma	≥1	97 fatalities, ≥150 injuries	An estimated F5 tornado largely destroyed Snyder, Oklahoma.
1908 Dixie tornado outbreak	April 23–25, 1908	Southeastern United States	–	324 fatalities, ≥1,720 injuries	Tied with the 2011 Super Outbreak for fourth-deadliest US tornado outbreak. Produced numerous violent tornadoes in the Southern United States and Great Plains, including an F5 tornado in Nebraska. One long-track tornado killed 143 people alone in Louisiana and Mississippi. See, e.g., Wilmer, Louisiana. (≥34 significant, ≥6 violent, ≥13 killer)
Late-April 1909 tornado outbreak	April 29 – May 1, 1909	Mississippi-Tennessee Valley	–	≥165 fatalities, ≥696 injuries	Produced numerous killer tornadoes across the Southern United States. Two tornadoes in Mississippi and Alabama killed 29 each. (≥35 significant, ≥4 violent, ≥23 killer)

=== 1910s ===
List of United States tornado outbreaks – 1910–1919
Outbreak	Dates	Region	Tornadoes	Casualties	Notes
Tornado outbreak of November 11, 1911	November 11, 1911	Midwestern United States	≥ 9	13 fatalities, 117 injuries	Outbreak was produced by a large and dynamic storm system. F4 struck Janesville, Wisconsin, and killed nine people. Other killer tornadoes occurred in Illinois and Michigan. (9 significant, 1 violent, 3 killer)
Tornado outbreak of April 20–22, 1912	April 20–22, 1912	Southern-Central Great Plains – Middle Mississippi Valley – Southeastern United States	–	≥ 56 fatalities, injuries	Numerous violent tornadoes in North Texas, Oklahoma, and Kansas, including what is now the Dallas–Fort Worth metroplex. (≥30 significant, 9 violent, ≥19 killer)
Tornado outbreak of April 27–29, 1912	April 27–29, 1912	Southern-Central Great Plains – Red River basin – Ark-La-Miss region	–	≥ 45 fatalities, 167 injuries	Violent tornadoes struck portions of the Great Plains, mainly in Oklahoma. (25 significant, 8 violent, 15 killer)
Tornado outbreak of March 13–14, 1913	March 13–14, 1913	Southeastern United States – Middle Mississippi Valley	≥ 23	≥ 76 fatalities, ≥ 501 injuries	Produced deadly, long-tracked F3+ tornadoes in Tennessee. (21 significant, 3 violent, 17 killer)
Tornado outbreak of March 20–21, 1913	March 20–21, 1913	Southeastern United States	≥ 16	56 fatalities, ≥ 156 injuries	Generated a violent F4 tornado that killed 27 people in Alabama. (14 significant, 1 violent, 10 killer)
1913 Easter tornado outbreak	March 23, 1913	Central Great Plains	≥ 15	≥ 192 fatalities, ≥ 853 injuries	Produced the devastating Omaha tornado (103 deaths), among several other violent and deadly tornadoes in Nebraska. Violent tornadoes also killed numerous people in Missouri and Indiana. (14 significant, 6 violent, 7 killer)
Tornado outbreak of June 5–6, 1916	June 5–6, 1916	Mississippi Valley – Southern U.S.	≥ 35	≥ 143 fatalities, ≥ 756 injuries	Produced numerous killer tornadoes in Arkansas, including one that killed 25 people. An F3 killed 13 people in the northern suburbs of Jackson, Mississippi. (34 significant, 1 violent, 23 killer)
February 1917 Southeast tornado outbreak	February 23, 1917	Southeastern United States	–	17 fatalities, 81 injuries	Six strong tornadoes touched down across the South. (≥6 significant, ≥3 killer)
March 1917 tornado outbreak	March 23, 1917	Ohio Valley	> 9	47 fatalities, 311 injuries	F4 tornado devastated New Albany, Indiana. Destroyed two schools and a wood shop. At least 300 homes were destroyed, some swept away. (≥9 significant, 1 violent, 2 killer)
Tornado outbreak sequence of May 25–June 1, 1917	May 25 – June 1, 1917	Central – Southeastern United States	≥ 73	>382 fatalities	One of the deadliest tornado outbreak sequences in US history. An F5 killed 23 people in Kansas. One tornado family in Illinois killed 101 people alone. A long-track tornado killed 67 people, mostly in Kentucky. (63 significant, 15 violent, 35 killer)
May 1918 tornado outbreak sequence	May 18–21, 1918	Central-Northern Great Plains – Upper Midwest	–	44 fatalities, 340 injuries	(≥34 significant, 5 violent, 13 killer)
1918 Tyler tornado	August 21, 1918	Tyler, Minnesota	–	36 killed, 225 injured	F4 tornado killed 36 people in and near Tyler.
March 1919 tornado outbreak	March 14–16, 1919	Central United States	–	53 fatalities, 219 injuries	(4 violent, 18 killer)
Tornado outbreak of April 1919	April 8–9, 1919	Southern Great Plains	–	92 fatalities, 412 injuries	Unusual nocturnal outbreak produced numerous violent, large, long-tracked tornadoes in East Texas. (4 violent, 10 killer)
1919 Fergus Falls tornado	June 22, 1919	Fergus Falls, Minnesota	–	57 fatalities, 200 injured	F5 tornado leveled many homes in Fergus Falls, killing 57 people. 35 of the deaths were at the three-story Grand Hotel, which was completely destroyed.

=== 1920s ===
List of United States tornado outbreaks – 1920–1929
Outbreak	Dates	Region	Tornadoes	Casualties	Notes
1920 Palm Sunday tornado outbreak	March 28, 1920	Midwest – Southeast	≥37	≥153 fatalities, ≥1215 injuries	First of the Palm Sunday outbreaks; one of the deadliest outbreaks in US history. Tornadoes devastated the Great Lakes and Ohio Valley, including parts of the Chicago metropolitan area. Other long-track killer tornadoes tore across the Southern states. Official death toll is uncertain and may be considerably higher than what is listed. (32 significant, 8 violent, 19 killer)
April 1920 tornado outbreak	April 19–21, 1920	Southeastern United States	≥17	224 fatalities, 1374 injuries	Several violent, long-track tornadoes touched down across the South, killing numerous people. Mississippi and Alabama were the hardest hit, with multiple tornadoes producing double-digit death tolls, including one that killed 88 people alone. (14 significant, 7 violent, 9 killer)
April 1921 tornado outbreak	April 15–16, 1921	Southern U.S.	–	90 fatalities, 676 injuries	Violent, long-tracked tornado killed 59 people in Texas and Arkansas. (34 significant, 1 violent, 17 killer)
1922 Austin twin tornadoes	May 4, 1922	Texas	2	13 fatalities, 50 injuries	(Deadliest tornadoes in Austin history) (1 violent, 2 killer)
April 1923 tornado outbreak sequence	April 4, 1923	High Plains	–	14 fatalities, 68 injuries	(2 violent, 4 killer)
May 1923 Great Plains tornado outbreak	May 2, 1923	Great Plains	4	17 fatalities, 68 injuries	(1 violent, 4 killer)
April 1924 tornado outbreak	April 30, 1924	Southeastern United States	≥28	110 fatalities, 1133 injuries	Long-tracked tornado family killed seven people at a school in Horrell Hill, South Carolina. Multiple violent killer tornadoes struck the Carolinas and Georgia. (28 significant, 2 violent, 16 killer)
1924 Lorain–Sandusky tornado	June 28, 1924	Eastern Great Lakes	≥6	90 fatalities, 349 injuries	Deadliest tornado in Ohio history, estimated to have been an F4. (6 significant, 1 violent, 4 killer)
1925 Tri-State tornado outbreak	March 18, 1925	Middle Mississippi – Ohio Valley	≥12	≥751 fatalities, ≥2298 injuries	A deadly outbreak, including the deadliest and longest-tracked tornado in U.S. history–the Tri-State tornado, a massive F5 tornado that traveled 219 mi (352 km) across the three states of Missouri, Illinois, and Indiana, killing 695 people. Third-costliest U.S. tornado ever. Other violent tornadoes hit Kentucky and Tennessee, including a long-tracked F4 that killed 38 people. (≥9 significant, 3 violent, 8 killer)
1926 La Plata, Maryland tornado outbreak	November 9, 1926	Mid-Atlantic	–	17 fatalities, 65 injuries	17 people killed at schools in La Plata. An F4 tornado also hit the area on April 28, 2002.
Late-November 1926 tornado outbreak	November 25–26, 1926	South	≥27	107 fatalities, 451 injuries	Deadliest November tornado outbreak in the US, produced several long-tracked, strong, killer tornadoes. (27 significant, 2 violent, 18 killer)
1927 Rocksprings, Texas tornado	April 12, 1927	Southern Great Plains	1	74 fatalities, 205 injuries	A large F5 tornado struck Rocksprings, Texas, destroying 235 of 247 buildings in town. (1 violent, 1 killer)
April 1927 Southern Plains-Midwest tornado outbreak	April 18–19, 1927	Southern Great Plains – Midwest	–	≥46 fatalities, ≥235 injuries	(16 significant, 3 violent, 5 killer)
Tornado outbreak of May 1927	May 8–9, 1927	Great Plains – Mississippi Valley	22	217 fatalities, 1156 injuries	One of the most prolific outbreaks in US history. A long-tracked F5 on May 7 in Kansas killed 10 people and injured 300. Other deadly tornadoes hit Missouri, Illinois, and Arkansas including an F4 on May 9 that devastated Poplar Bluff, Missouri, killing 98 people. (32 significant, 8 violent, 17 killer)
1927 St. Louis tornado outbreak	September 29, 1927	Middle-Lower Mississippi Valley	15	82 fatalities, 620 injuries	Produced a devastating tornado that struck St. Louis and killed 79 people. Estimated to have been an F3, but may have been an F4. (11 significant, 3 killer)
September 1928 Upper Plains-Midwest tornado outbreak	September 13–14, 1928	Upper Great Plains – Midwest	–	23 fatalities, 197 injuries	Most intense September outbreak in US history. Several violent tornadoes, including one F4 that hit Rockford, Illinois. (15 significant, 3 violent, 3 killer)
January 1929 Mid-Mississippi Valley tornado outbreak	January 18, 1929	Middle Mississippi Valley	–	10 fatalities, 46 injuries	(7 significant, 5 killer)
1929 Slocum, Texas-Statesboro, Georgia tornado outbreaks	April 24–25, 1929	Great Plains – Midwest – Southeast	–	63 fatalities, 567 injuries	(15 significant, 4 violent, 7 killer)
1929 Rye Cove tornado outbreak	May 1–2, 1929	Southern – Eastern United States	17	44 fatalities, 349 injuries	13 people killed at school in Rye Cove, Virginia. (17 significant, 10 killer)

=== 1930s ===
List of United States tornado outbreaks – 1930–1939
Outbreak	Dates	Region	Tornadoes	Casualties	Notes
May 1930 tornado outbreak sequence	May 1–2 & 5–6, 1930	Great Plains – Mississippi Valley	–	94 fatalities, 520 injuries	Very intense and prolific outbreak sequence including a deadly F4 tornado in Frost, Texas, which resulted in 41 fatalities. (51 significant, 11 violent, 15 killer)
November 1930 Southern Plains tornado outbreak	November 19, 1930	Southern Great Plains	–	24 fatalities, 162 injuries	Morning F4 tornado kills 23 people in Bethany, Oklahoma. (8 significant, 1 violent, 2 killer)
1932 Deep South tornado outbreak	March 21–22, 1932	Southeastern United States	≥38	≥330 fatalities, 2145 injuries	One of the most intense outbreaks in US history, produced 10 violent tornadoes. Third-deadliest continuous tornado outbreak in US history. Hundreds of people were killed by violent tornadoes across the Southern United States. Deadliest Alabama outbreak with 268 fatalities. (36 significant, 10 violent, 27 killer)
March 1933 Nashville tornado outbreak	March 14, 1933	Tennessee Valley	>5	44 fatalities, 461 injuries	Destructive F3 tornado through downtown Nashville, killing 11 people. Other tornadoes touched down across the Ohio Valley, including an F4 that killed 12. (≥5 significant, 1 violent, ≥4 killer)
Late-March 1933 tornado outbreak	March 30–31, 1933	Southeast	–	87 fatalities, 620 injuries	(30 significant, 1 violent, 16 killer)
Tornado outbreak sequence of May 4–10, 1933	May 4–10, 1933	South	≥33	128 fatalities	Produced an F4 that struck Tompkinsville, Kentucky, and killed 36 people. Another F4 struck rural Tennessee and killed 35. Numerous other killer tornadoes touched down across the Southern United States. (27 significant, 3 violent, 10 killer)
1936 Cordele–Greensboro tornado outbreak	April 1–2, 1936	Southeast	≥13	45 fatalities, 568 injuries	Produced multiple killer tornadoes in Georgia and the Carolinas. An F4 tornado in Cordele, Georgia, killed 23 people. (8 significant, 3 violent, 10 killer)
1936 Tupelo–Gainesville tornado outbreak	April 5–6, 1936	Southeastern United States	17	454 fatalities, 2498 injuries	Second-deadliest continuous tornado outbreak in US history. Several strong and deadly tornadoes were observed across the South. Two of the individual tornadoes killed well over 200 people each. (12 significant, 3 violent, 11 killer)
1938 Rodessa, Louisiana tornado	February 17, 1938	Mississippi Valley	1	21 fatalities, (27)? injuries	An F4 tornado that destroyed a large portion of the town and left many of its victims violently dismembered. It is thought that the high death toll was caused by the rural town's lack of suitable infrastructure and use of corrugated metal.
1938 Bakerville, Missouri tornado outbreak	March 15, 1938	Mississippi Valley	–	24 fatalities, 200 injuries	(14 significant, 2 violent, 6 killer)
Late-March 1938 tornado outbreak	March 30–31, 1938	Southern Plains – Mississippi Valley	–	40 fatalities, 548 injuries	An F3 tornado in South Pekin, Illinois, destroyed the town and killed 9. Remains Central Illinois' deadliest tornado after 75 years, (26 significant, 3 violent, 9 killer)
1938 Oshkosh, Nebraska tornado outbreak	April 26, 1938	Great Plains	–	6 fatalities, 39 injuries	F5 near Oshkosh killed three students at a leveled school. Several other strong tornadoes were observed that day, killing three others. (9 significant, 2 violent, 2 killer)
1938 Charleston, South Carolina tornadoes	September 29, 1938	South Carolina	–	32 fatalities, 100 injuries	(2 killers)
April 1939 tornado outbreak sequence	April 14–17, 1939	Great Plains – Mississippi Valley	–	57 fatalities, 316 injuries	Included a long-tracked F5 tornado family on April 14 in Oklahoma and Kansas that killed seven people. (25 significant, 3 violent, 11 killer)

=== 1940s ===
List of United States tornado outbreaks – 1940–1949
Outbreak	Dates	Region	Tornadoes	Casualties	Notes
February 1942 tornado outbreak	February 5–6, 1942	Southeast	≥28	22 fatalities, 330 injuries	(22 significant, 9 killer)
Tornado outbreak of March 16–17, 1942	March 16, 1942	Central – Southern U.S.	–	148 fatalities, ≥1284 injuries	Produced a deadly tornado family in Mississippi that killed 63 people. An F5 struck Lacon, Illinois, killing eight people. A long-tracked F4 killed 15 people in Tennessee. (25 significant, 7 violent, 18 killer)
April–May 1942 tornado outbreak sequence	April 27–30 & May 2, 1942	Great Plains	–	123 fatalities, ≥839 injuries	Included six F4s that devastated northeast Oklahoma and southeast Kansas on May 2. (20 significant, 11 violent, 17 killers)
January 1944 Oklahoma tornado outbreak	January 26. 1944	Southern Great Plains	–	2 fatalities, 40 injuries	(8 significant, 2 killer)
1944 South Dakota–Minnesota tornado outbreak	June 17, 1944	South Dakota, Minnesota	–	13 fatalities, ≥80 injuries	An F5 tornado killed eight people in South Dakota and dissipated in Minnesota. Farms south of Wilmot, South Dakota, were destroyed with no debris left behind. Two other deadly tornadoes, rated F3 and F4 by Grazulis, struck elsewhere in South Dakota. Official records only list windstorms even though well-defined funnels were sighted. (6 significant, 2 violent, 3 killers)
1944 Appalachians tornado outbreak	June 22–23, 1944	Great Lakes – Mid-Atlantic	>7	163 fatalities, ≥1044 injuries	100 died in a single tornado in West Virginia, the deadliest in the state's history. Other deadly tornadoes were observed in Pennsylvania and Maryland. First of two violent outbreaks in Pennsylvania, the other occurring on May 31, 1985, with an F5 tornado hitting Wheatland, Pennsylvania. (≥7 significant, 3 violent, ≥6 killers)
Tornado outbreak of February 12, 1945	February 12, 1945	Alabama and Mississippi	8	43 fatalities, 417 injuries	Included a devastating tornado that struck Montgomery, Alabama, killing 26 people. The U.S. Weather Bureau would describe this tornado as "the most officially observed one in history". (8 significant, 1 violent, 4 killers)
Tornado outbreak of April 1945	April 12, 1945	Southern Great Plains – Mississippi Valley	≥17	128 fatalities, 1001 injuries	A large and deadly F5 struck Antlers, Oklahoma, killing at least 67 people. (17 significant, 5 violent, 10 killer).
1945 Jamestown Tornado	June 10, 1945	Jamestown, New York	–	0 deaths, 14 injured	A tornado touched down in Jamestown at 9:30 pm, with many factory buildings losing their roofs and in some cases even their top floors, and causing significant damage to hundreds of homes, totaling $5 million ($89 million in 2025 dollars).
Tornado outbreak of January 4–6, 1946	January 4–6, 1946	South—Central United States	10	47 fatalities, 412+ injuries	Includes the Log Lake–Southview–Palestine tornado, which is classified as one of the worst tornadoes in the history of Texas. (9 significant, 3 violent, 7 killer)
1946 Windsor–Tecumseh tornado	June 17, 1946	River Rouge, Michigan – Windsor, Ontario	–	17 dead, dozens injured	Third-deadliest tornado in Canadian history, formed in River Rouge, Michigan. May have been an F5.
January 1947 tornado outbreak	January 29–30, 1947	Mississippi Valley – Southeast	–	8 fatalities, 155 injuries	(15 significant, 1 violent, 5 killer)
1947 Glazier–Higgins–Woodward tornado outbreak	April 9–10, 1947	Southern Great Plains	–	181 fatalities, 980 injuries	Deadly tornado family devastated multiple towns in Texas and Oklahoma, producing F5 damage. Entire communities were either partly or totally swept away in both states. (≥8 significant, ≥2 violent, ≥1 killer)
1947 New Year's Eve tornado outbreak	December 31, 1947	Southern U.S.	–	20 fatalities, 256 injuries	(7 significant, 1 violent, 3 killer)
1948 Alton-Bunker Hill-Gillespie tornado outbreak	March 18–19, 1948	Great Plains – Middle Mississippi Valley	–	43 fatalities, ≥566 injuries	Early-morning F4 killed 33 people in Illinois. (25 significant, 3 violent, 5 killers)
1948 Tinker Air Force Base tornadoes	March 20 & 25, 1948	Oklahoma City	2		First successful tornado prediction in history by Maj. Ernest J. Fawbush and Capt. Robert C. Miller who was on duty at Tinker Air Force Base in Oklahoma City, Oklahoma.
Late-March 1948 tornado outbreak	March 25–27, 1948	Central United States	–	37 fatalities, 321 injuries	(19 significant, 3 violent, 5 killer)
May 1948 McKinney tornado outbreak	May 3, 1948	McKinney, Texas	1	3 fatalities, 43 injured	An F3 tornado touched down in the southwest portion of the city at 2:59 pm, causing minor destruction to 300 homes including a few churches and a nearby plant base caused by all 3 hazards, including 100 mph winds.
Tornado outbreak of January 3, 1949	January 3, 1949	South-Central United States	≥ 14	60+ fatalities, 504 injuries	An F4 tornado killed 55 people in and near Warren, Arkansas. (12 significant, 1 violent, 5 killer)
Tornado outbreak of April 30 – May 1, 1949	April 30 – May 1, 1949	Central and Southern United States	≥ 24	10 fatalities, 103 injuries	An F4 tornado hit the site of the future National Severe Storms Laboratory (NSSL) in Norman, Oklahoma. (18 significant, 1 violent, 6 killer)
Tornado outbreak of May 20–22, 1949	May 20–22, 1949	Great Plains and Midwest	≥ 66	57 fatalities, 558 injuries	A massive outbreak struck the Great Plains and Midwest. (51 significant, 6 violent, 13 killer)

=== 1950s ===
List of United States tornado outbreaks – 1950–1959
Outbreak	Dates	Region	Tornadoes	Casualties	Notes
Tornado outbreak of February 11–13, 1950	February 11–13, 1950	Lower-Middle Mississippi Valley	19	45 fatalities, 201 injuries	A tornado outbreak produced several long–tracked, deadly tornadoes that touched down in Louisiana, Texas, Mississippi, and Arkansas. (14 significant, 1 violent, 8 killer)
Tornado outbreak of March 26–27, 1950	March 26-27, 1950	Mississippi Valley	16	1 fatality, 52 injuries	A destructive outbreak produced two F3 tornadoes in Arkansas and a fatal F2 tornado in Mississippi. An F2 tornado also struck Downtown Little Rock, Arkansas, while twin F2 tornadoes damaged Downtown Jackson, Mississippi. (12 significant, 1 killer)
Tornado outbreak of April 28–29, 1950	April 28-29, 1950	Great Plains - Mississippi Valley	7	11 fatalities, 38 injuries	Several destructive tornadoes touched down with all three F3+ tornadoes being killers. (5 significant, 2 violent, 3 killer)
Tornado outbreak of June 19, 1951	June 19, 1951	Midwest	5	1 fatality, 20 injuries	A small, but destructive outbreak spawned a violent, long-tracked F4 tornado in Minnesota with all casualties coming from this storm. (2 significant, 1 violent killer)
Tornado outbreak sequence of June 25–27, 1951	June 25-27, 1951	Great Plains - Midwest - Northeastern United States	13	6 fatalities, 161 injuries	An F4 tornado killed five and injured 100 in WaKeeney, Kansas, while F3 tornadoes killed one and injured 50 in Illinois. (7 significant, 1 violent, 2 killer)
Great Lakes tornadoes of September 26, 1951	September 26, 1951	Wisconsin - Michigan	3	8 fatalities, 15 injuries	A destructive series of three tornadoes touched down, all of which caused major damage, injuries and fatalities. (3 significant killers, 2 violent killers)
Tornado outbreak of February 13, 1952	February 13, 1952	Southeastern United States	15	5 fatalities, 102 injuries	A destructive outbreak hit the Southeast with three killer F3+ tornadoes occurring in Alabama and Tennessee. (8 significant, 1 violent, 3 killer)
Tornado outbreak of Leap Day 1952	February 29, 1952	Tennessee, Alabama, Georgia	8	5 fatalities, 336 injuries	A localized, but destructive and deadly tornado outbreak impacted three states. An F1 tornado killed three people and injured 166 others in Belfast, Tennessee, an F4 tornado killed two and injured 150 in Fayetteville, Tennessee, and an F3 tornado injured 12 in Fort Payne, Alabama. (7 significant, 1 violent, 2 killer)
Tornado outbreak of March 21–22, 1952	March 21–22, 1952	Lower-Middle Mississippi Valley	31	209 fatalities, 1,212 injuries	This was the fourth-most violent outbreak in U.S. since 1950 with 11 F4 tornadoes, most intense ever in Arkansas. F4 tornadoes that struck Judsonia and Cotton Plant killed a total of 79 people. Other F4 tornadoes struck Tennessee and Northern Mississippi. The event marked the first time the word "tornado" was used during a public television weather broadcast (it was said by Oklahoma City WKY-TV's weatherman Harry Volkman). The word had been a banned word by the FCC at the time. (28 significant, 11 violent, 20 killer)
Tornado outbreak of May 21–24, 1952	May 21–24, 1952	Great Plains - Great Lakes - Southeastern United States	16	8 injuries	A moderate outbreak produced a large F4 tornado outside of Kansas City, inflicting major damage. Some tornado experts say the tornado may have reached F5 intensity. (6 significant, 1 violent)
Tornado outbreak of June 23–24, 1952	June 23–24, 1952	Great Plains - Midwest	7	2 fatalities, 35 injuries	Several intense tornadoes touched down, including an F4 tornado in Iowa and a fatal F3 tornado in Wisconsin. The Minneapolis metro was struck by long-tracked F2 tornadoes on both outbreak days with the second one moving directly through Downtown. (5 significant, 1 violent, 1 killer)
Tornado outbreak of March 12–15, 1953	March 12–15, 1953	Great Plains, Mississippi Valley, Southeast	23	21 fatalities, 72 injuries	This outbreak produced a devastating F4 tornado that killed 17 in Western North Texas as well as multiple strong tornadoes in Arkansas. (18 significant, 1 violent, 4 killer)
Tornado outbreak sequence of April 28 – May 2, 1953	April 28–May 2, 1953	Southeast	24	36 fatalities, 361 injuries	Five deadly F4 tornadoes across four states, including one that killed 18 on Robins Air Force Base. (15 significant, 5 violent, 7 killer)
1953 Waco tornado outbreak	May 9–11, 1953	Southern-Central Great Plains / Upper Mississippi Valley	33	144 fatalities, 895 injuries	The outbreak produced the first officially rated F5 tornado in Waco, Texas, killing 114 people. It is tied for deadliest tornado in Texas history and the eleventh deadliest in United States. Other deadly tornadoes struck Hebron, Nebraska, and San Angelo, Texas. (17 significant, 5 violent, 6 killer)
1953 Sarnia tornado outbreak	May 20-21, 1953	Midwest, Ontario	3	8 fatalities, 123 injuries	Two F3 tornadoes and an F4 tornado touched down over a two-day period, causing catastrophic damage and several fatalities. (3 significant, 1 violent, 2 killer)
Tornado outbreak of May 29, 1953	May 29, 1953	Great Plains	9	2 fatalities, 22 injuries	An F5 tornado caused catastrophic damage in Fort Rice, North Dakota, although the rating is disputed. It was part of a small outbreak that affected five states. (6 significant, 1 violent killer)
Flint–Worcester tornado outbreak sequence	June 7–9, 1953	Central Great Plains – Great Lakes – New England	50	247 fatalities, 2,562 injuries	Numerous tornadoes struck the Great Plains and Midwestern United States. The Flint-Beecher F5 tornado produced the last 100+ death toll for a single tornado in US history until the 2011 Joplin tornado. An F4 tornado that struck Worcester, Massachusetts, killed 94 people and may have reached F5 status as well. (26 significant, 6 violent, 7 killer)
Tornado outbreak of June 27, 1953	June 27, 1953	North Dakota, Iowa	5	1 fatality, 5 injures	A violent F5 tornado obliterated farms east of Anita, Iowa. It was part of small outbreak that affected two states. (3 significant, 1 violent killer)
Tornado outbreak sequence of December 1–6, 1953	December 1–6, 1953	Southeast United States	19	49 fatalities, 404 injuries	A destructive outbreak sequence produced two violent tornadoes, including an F5 tornado that struck Downtown Vicksburg, Mississippi. It is one of only two official December F5 tornadoes in US history, although the rating is disputed. An F4 tornado also passed near Fort Polk and Alexandria, Louisiana. (15 significant, 2 violent, 3 killer)
Tornado outbreak of March 24–25, 1954	March 24–25, 1954	Great Plains – Arkansas	28	2 fatalities, 11 injuries	Several strong to violent tornadoes touched down, including an F3 tornado that injured four in Bentonville, Missouri, and an F4 tornado in rural Texas County, Missouri, that killed two people. (12 significant, 1 violent killer)
Tornado outbreak of April 5–9, 1954	April 5–9, 1954	Midwestern, Southeastern United States	21	1 fatality, 22 injuries	An F4 tornado tracked from near Westboro, Missouri, to near Northboro, Iowa, injuring two people, while an F3 tornado destroyed most of Indian Oaks, Illinois, killing one person and injuring 13 others.
Tornado outbreak sequence of April 25 – May 3, 1954	April 25 – May 3, 1954	Great Plains – Midwest – Mississippi Valley	100	4 fatalities, 167 injuries	This was one of the largest tornado outbreak sequences at the time. Several long-tracked tornadoes touched down in Texas, Arkansas, and Iowa and violent tornadoes touched down in Iowa, Texas, Oklahoma. (50 significant, 3 violent, 2 killer)
Tornado outbreak sequence of May 30 – June 3, 1954	May 30–June 3, 1954	Great Plains – Eastern United States	39	9 fatalities, 65 injuries	This outbreak produced a catastrophic F4 tornado in Kalamazoo, Nebraska, killing six, and injuring 23. F3 tornadoes also caused casualties in the Wichita Falls, Texas, metropolitan area. (22 significant, 1 violent, 4 killer)
Tornado outbreak of December 5, 1954	December 5, 1954	Georgia, Alabama	14	2 fatalities, 125 injuries	Multiple long-tracked F2-F3 tornadoes touched down. An F2 tornado also hit the Atlanta metro. (10 significant, 2 killer)
Tornado outbreak of February 1, 1955 (unofficial)	February 1, 1955	Mississippi, Tennessee	2–4	23 fatalities, 166 injuries (unofficial)	An F3 tornado killed 20 people in and near Commerce, Mississippi, most of them at a plantation school, and destroyed 45 homes. An F2 tornado destroyed another school between Lewisberg and Olive Branch, Mississippi, killing 3 others. A survey team declared that these events were not tornadoes, despite the fact that the funnels were sighted and heavy debris was carried long distances. As a result, they are not listed as tornadoes in official records. Official records list two tornadoes as striking southern Tennessee, but Grazulis states that one of these was likely a downburst. (2–3 significant, 2 killer)
1955 Great Plains tornado outbreak	May 25–26, 1955	Great Plains – Midwest – Mississippi Valley	46	102 fatalities, 593 injuries	This was one of the deadliest Plains outbreaks on record. An F5 tornado struck Blackwell, Oklahoma, killing 20 people. Another F5 tornado from the same storm struck Udall, Kansas, killing 80. (17 significant, 3 violent killer)
Tornado outbreak of November 15–16, 1955	November 15–16, 1955	Mississippi, Ohio Valleys	18	1 fatality, 35 injuries	Multiple strong tornadoes touched down, including a deadly, long-tracked F3 tornado in Arkansas and a destructive F2 tornado in Downtown Indianapolis. (10 significant, 1 killer)
Tornado outbreak of February 14–18, 1956	February 14–18, 1956	Southeast	16	2 fatalities, 64 injuries	A large, early season outbreak caused numerous casualties. (10 significant, 2 killer)
Tornado outbreak of February 24–25, 1956	February 24–25, 1956	Central United States	23	6 fatalities, 47 injuries	The St. Louis metro was hit by a violent and deadly F4 tornado. An F2 tornado also hit the Cincinnati metro. (14 significant, 1 violent killers)
Tornado outbreak of April 2–3, 1956	April 2–3, 1956	Central United States	47	38 fatalities, 638 injuries	An F5 tornado struck the suburbs of Grand Rapids, Michigan, on April 3, killing 17 people. Other significant tornadoes struck Oklahoma and Kansas on April 2 and the Great Lakes region on April 3. (33 significant, 6 violent, 8 killer)
1956 McDonald Chapel tornado	April 14–15, 1956	Southern Great Plains – Great Lakes – Southeastern United States	5	25 fatalities, 200 injuries	An F4 tornado struck the Birmingham suburbs on April 15, killing 25 people. It was part of a very small outbreak of tornadoes. (2 significant, 1 violent killer)
Tornado outbreak sequence of May 12–14, 1956	May 12–14, 1956	Michigan, Nebraska, Pennsylvania, Missouri, Texas	19	4 fatalities, 162 injuries	Five separate outbreaks hit five separate states. Two F4 tornadoes caused major damage in Flint, Michigan, and the Southern suburbs of Detroit. (11 significant, 2 violent, 2 killer)
Tornado outbreak sequence of April 2–5, 1957	April 2–5, 1957	Great Plains, Midwest, Southeastern United States	72	21 fatalities, 338 injuries	A widely photographed and filmed F3 tornado struck just outside of Dallas, killing 10 people. Other deadly tornadoes struck Oklahoma, Arkansas, and Georgia. (33 significant, 2 violent, 8 killer)
Tornado outbreak of April 8, 1957	April 8, 1957	Alabama – Georgia – North Carolina – South Carolina – Tennessee – Nebraska – Virginia	19	7 fatalities, 223 injuries	The outbreak produced several destructive tornadoes across the South. The town of Jefferson, South Carolina, was devastated by an F4 tornado family. (16 significant, 2 violent, 3 killer)
Tornado outbreak sequence of April 18–27, 1957	April 18–27, 1957	Great Plains, Mississippi Valley, Great Lakes	117	2 fatalities, 33 injuries	A long-lived outbreak sequence produced numerous significant tornadoes. April 21 featured two violent F4 tornadoes, one of which hit Lubbock, Texas. (42 significant, 4 violent, 2 killer)
Tornado outbreak of May 12–17, 1957	May 12–17, 1957	Great Plains, Midwest, Southeast	50	23 fatalities, 105 injuries	An F4 tornado struck Silverton, Texas. (15 significant, 1 violent, 3 killer)
May 1957 Central Plains tornado outbreak sequence	May 19–21, 1957	California – Central Great Plains – Middle-Upper Mississippi Valley	57	59 fatalities, 341 injuries	This outbreak produced numerous tornadoes across the Great Plains states, including an F5 tornado that ripped through several Kansas City suburbs and killed 44 people. Other deadly tornadoes touched down in Missouri. (29 significant, 4 violent, 3 killer)
Tornado outbreak of May 24–25, 1957	May 24–25, 1957	New Mexico and southern Great Plains	45	4 fatalities, 10 injuries	Several strong to violent tornadoes touched down across the southern Great Plains, including, an F3 tornado caused severe damage in Olton, Texas, and an F4 tornado killed four people near Lawton, Oklahoma. (12 significant, 1 violent killer)
June 20–23, 1957 tornado outbreak sequence	June 20–23, 1957	Great Plains, Midwest	23	≥11 fatalities, 105 injuries	This outbreak sequence produced what may have been one of the most intense F5 tornadoes in US history that killed 10 people in Fargo, North Dakota. An additional fatality occurred in South Dakota from an F2 tornado. (7 significant, 1 violent, 2 killer)
Tornado outbreak of November 7–8, 1957	November 7–8, 1957	Southeastern United States	20	14 fatalities, 199 injuries	An intense outbreak spawned a F4 tornado that killed one in Orange, Texas. (12 significant, 1 violent, 6 killer)
Tornado outbreak of November 16–19, 1957	November 16–19, 1957	Southeastern United States, Northeastern United States	32	10 fatalities, 84 injuries	Alabama took the brunt of this outbreak as both killer F4 tornadoes and eight of the 10 deaths from the outbreak occurred in this state alone. The other deadly tornado was in Mississippi. (15 significant, 2 violent, 4 killer)
Tornado outbreak sequence of December 18–20, 1957	December 18–20, 1957	Missouri, Illinois, Arkansas, Tennessee, Alabama	37	19 fatalities, 291 injuries	This was one of the most intense December outbreaks in the Contiguous United States and the most intense Illinois tornado outbreak in any month. An F4 tornado struck Mt. Vernon, Illinois, an F5 tornado obliterated Sunfield, Illinois, and a long-tracked F4 struck several towns hit by the 1925 Tri-State tornado. An additional F4 tornado hit Arkansas. (29 significant, 4 violent, 6 killer)
Tornado outbreak of April 15, 1958	April 15, 1958	Florida and Georgia	5	36 injuries	A small, but deadly outbreak produce one of only two known F4 tornadoes in Florida, although the rating is disputed. (3 significant, 1 violent)
Tornado outbreak of June 4, 1958	June 4, 1958	Great Plains – Upper Midwest	10	28 fatalities, 133 injuries	A series of strong and destructive tornadoes affected Wisconsin, including an F5 tornado that devastated the town of Colfax, although the rating is disputed. (6 significant, 3 violent killers)
Tornado outbreak of November 1958	November 13–17, 1958	Great Plains, Mississippi Valley	43	37 injuries	Several destructive tornadoes touched down during the period with 34 of the 43 tornadoes touching down on the final day of the outbreak. (25 significant)
St. Louis tornado outbreak of February 1959	February 9–10, 1959	Great Plains, Midwest, Southeast	17	21 fatalities, 358 injuries	A devastating F4 tornado struck northwestern Downtown St. Louis while an F3 tornado heavily damaged an occupied school in Southern Highland County, Ohio. (7 significant, 1 violent killer)
Tornado outbreak of March 31 – April 2, 1959	March 31-April 2, 1959	Great Plains - Midwest - Southeast	17	7 fatalities, 83 injuries	An F4 tornado killed six in Texas and an F2 tornado killed one in Florida. (9 significant, 1 violent, 2 killer)
Tornado outbreak of May 4–6, 1959	May 4–6, 1959	Great Plains, Midwest	50	2 injuries	A total of 46 tornadoes touched down on May 4. (15 significant)
Tornado outbreak sequence of May 8–12, 1959	May 8–12, 1959	Great Plains, Mississippi Valley, Eastern United States	60	7 fatalities, 34 injuries	This outbreak produced F4 tornadoes in Oklahoma and Iowa. Tornadoes also struck the St. Louis suburbs as well as both Northeast Austin and Downtown Green Bay. (29 significant, 2 violent, 1 killer)
Tornado outbreak of May 20–21, 1959	May 20–21, 1959	Great Plains, Southeastern United States	15	5 injuries	An F4 tornado injured five people in Wayne County, Iowa. (4 significant, 1 violent)
Tornado outbreak sequence of September 26–29, 1959	September 26–29, 1959	Great Plains – Mississippi Valley	36	2 fatalities, 47 injuries	Numerous strong to violent tornadoes touched down two violent F4 tornadoes as well as the first F2 tornado ever in Idaho. Tornadoes also struck the suburbs of both Chicago and Milwaukee. (15 significant, 2 violent, 2 killer)
Hurricane Gracie tornado outbreak	September 29–30, 1959	Southeastern United States	6	12 fatalities, 13 injuries	Hurricane Gracie produced a small, but deadly outbreak after making landfall in North Carolina. September 30 produced two deadly F3 tornadoes that killed one and 11 in Virginia respectively. (3 significant, 2 killer)
Tornado outbreak of October 2–4, 1959	October 2–4, 1959	Great Plains	10	7 injuries	This tornado outbreak mostly the Dallas–Fort Worth metroplex, causing heavy damage. (2 significant)

=== 1960s ===
List of United States tornado outbreaks – 1960–1969
Outbreak	Dates	Region	Tornadoes	Casualties	Notes
Tornado outbreak of April 28–30, 1960	April 28–30, 1960	Great Plains - Midwest - Mississippi Valley	19	3 fatalities, 79 injuries	Tornado outbreak tore through Oklahoma City metropolitan area including one F3 tornado that tore the city, injuring 57. The three deaths came from a separate F2 tornado. (13 significant, 1 killer)
May 1960 tornado outbreak sequence	May 4–6, 1960	Southern Great Plains - Southern United States - Midwest	66	33 fatalities, 302 injuries	Produced numerous violent and killer tornadoes, especially in Oklahoma. An F5 tornado killed five people and produced extreme damage near Prague and Iron Post. An F4 tornado struck Wilburton and killed 16. (41 significant, 5 violent, 8 killer)
Tornado outbreak of February 24−25, 1961	February 24-25, 1961	Southeastern United States	14	11 injuries	Strong F2 tornadoes moved through multiple towns and cities across the Southeast. (7 significant)
Tornado outbreak sequence of April 23–30, 1961	April 23-30, 1961	Midwest - Mississippi Valley - Northeastern United States - Great Plains - South Texas	30	3 fatalities, 38 injuries	The most prolific days were April 23 and 25, when multiple long-tracked, large, and strong to violent tornadoes touched down, including five that traveled over 50 miles (80 km). An F3 tornado killed one in Iowa, an F4 tornado injured seven in Indiana and Ohio, and an F2 tornado killed two in Ohio. Strong F2 and F3 tornadoes also impacted Delaware, Corpus Christi, and the Northwestern Oklahoma City suburbs during the other outbreak days. (18 significant, 1 violent, 2 killer)
Tornado outbreak sequence of May 3–9, 1961	May 3–9, 1961	Great Plains - Mississippi Valley - Midwest - Northeastern - Mid-Atlantic - Southeastern United States	73	23 fatalities, 126 injuries	Outbreak produced many destructive and deadly tornadoes across a large swath of the country. This included an F2 tornado caused heavy damage in St. Petersburg, Florida, and an F4 tornado that killed 16 in Le Flore County, Oklahoma. (40 significant, 2 violent, 5 killer)
Hurricane Carla tornado outbreak	September 10–13, 1961	Southern U.S.	22	14 fatalities, 337 injuries	Produced several strong tornadoes, including a killer F4 tornado that hit Galveston, Texas. (15 significant, 1 violent, 3 killer)
Tornado outbreak of March 30–31, 1962	March 30-31, 1962	Southeastern United States	11	17 fatalities, 105 injuries	A catastrophic F3 tornado destroyed the northwest side of Milton, Florida, killing 17 people and injuring 100. Five other injuries occurred from other tornadoes as well. (4 significant, 1 killer)
Tornado outbreak sequence of May 14–31, 1962	May 14–31, 1962	United States	188	3 fatalities, 168 injuries	A very active stretch of severe weather produced 188 tornadoes. Although the worst tornadoes occurred during the outbreak sequence, the active period of daily tornadoes did not officially end until June 25. Devastating F3 tornadoes struck Mitchell, South Dakota, and the northern suburbs of Waterbury, Connecticut, causing severe damage and dozens of casualties. Three F4 tornadoes were also recorded, although one of them may have not reached such an intensity. (62 significant, 4 violent, 3 killer)
Tornado outbreak of March 10–12, 1963	March 10–12, 1963	Southeastern United States	18	6 fatalities, 38 injuries	A very destructive outbreak of tornadoes hit the Southeast. Both F4 tornadoes were killers along with two F2 tornadoes. (14 significant, 2 violent, 4 killer)
Tornado outbreak of April 17, 1963	April 17, 1963	Illinois - Indiana - Missouri - Michigan	6	2 fatalities, 71 injuries	Very intense localized outbreak produced a long-tracked, killer F4 tornado that hit Bourbonnais, Illinois. (4 significant, 1 violent, 2 killer)
Tornado outbreak of April 28–30, 1963	April 28–30, 1963	Midwest - Mississippi Valley - Southeastern United States	37	13 fatalities, 72 injuries	Multiple large and destructive tornadoes touched down with killer F2-F4 tornadoes occurring in four states. Additionally, an F2 tornado in Florida had a track of 61 miles (98 km). (24 significant, 1 violent, 5 killer)
Tornado outbreak sequence April 2–8, 1964	April 2–8, 1964	Great Plains - Southern United States - Midwest	33	7 fatalities, 119 injuries	The Wichita Falls, Texas, tornado of April 3 was rated F5. First tornado ever captured on live television. First of two violent tornadoes to hit Wichita Falls, the other—an F4 tornado that killed 42—occurring on April 10, 1979. (13 significant, 1 violent killer)
Tornado outbreak sequence April 12–14, 1964	April 12–14, 1964	Midwest - Ozarks	23	7 fatalities, 75 injuries	Killer outbreak of tornadoes hit the Kansas City metropolitan area as well as areas to the north and south. Both F4 tornadoes were killers. (11 significant, 2 violent, 5 killer)
Tornado outbreak sequence of May 1964	May 4–8, 1964	Great Plains - Midwest	73	15 fatalities, 383 injuries	Large outbreak produced multiple strong-to-violent tornadoes, including a long–tracked F5 tornado killed four in Nebraska and an F4 tornado that struck Metro Detroit in Macomb County, before continuing into Lambton County in Ontario, killing 11. (45 significant, 3 violent, 2 killer)
Hurricane Hilda tornado outbreak	October 3–4, 1964	Southeastern United States	12	22 fatalities, 172 injuries	Four states were hit by tornadoes produced by Hurricane Hilda, including a violent F4 tornado that caused catastrophic destruction in Larose, Louisiana. (8 significant, 1 violent killer)
Hurricane Isbell tornado outbreak	October 14, 1964	South Florida	9	48 injuries	Hurricane Isbell generated one of the most prolific tornado outbreaks ever recorded in South Florida as nine short-lived, but destructive tornadoes hit the state. (4 significant)
Tornado outbreak of Christmas 1964	December 24–26, 1964	Southeastern United States	14	2 fatalities, 28 injuries	Destructive tornado outbreak occurred during the Christmas holiday. One long-tracked F3 tornado killed two and injured 16 in Georgia. (8 significant, 1 killer)
Tornado outbreak of February 23, 1965	February 23, 1965	South Florida	4	8 injuries	Four destructive tornadoes hit South Florida, including an F2 tornado in Fort Myers as well as an F3 tornado that hit Fort Lauderdale. (2 significant)
Tornado outbreak of March 16–18, 1965	March 16–18, 1965	Great Plains - Southeastern United States - Midwest	24	2 fatalities, 129 injuries	Very destructive tornado outbreak caused major damage in multiple states. An F4 tornado tracked 82.7 miles (133.1 km) through Oklahoma and Kansas while a deadly F3 tornado killed two and injured 85 in North Carolina. (11 significant, 1 violent, 1 killer)
Tornado outbreak sequence of April 7–9, 1965	April 7–9, 1965	Midwest - California - Great Lakes - Southeastern United States	19	16 injuries	Destructive outbreak sequence struck the US right before the 1965 Palm Sunday tornado outbreak.(11 significant)
1965 Palm Sunday tornado outbreak	April 10–12, 1965	Central United States	55	266 fatalities, 3,662 injuries	One catastrophic F4 tornado killed six and injured 200 in Conway, Arkansas, before the main outbreak occurred the next day. It is among the most intense outbreaks ever recorded. Numerous violent and long-track tornadoes, some possibly reaching F5 intensity, tore across the Great Lakes states, killing hundreds of people. Two violent F4 tornadoes hit Dunlap, Indiana, killing 51 people there. Two F4 tornadoes with parallel paths in Michigan killed 44 people. Deadly tornadoes also impacted the Cleveland and Toledo areas. National Weather Service adopts standard broadcast language of tornado watch and tornado warning to use for public warnings of tornadoes following the aftermath of this storm. (38 significant, 18 violent, 22 killer)
Early May 1965 tornado outbreak	May 5–8, 1965	Great Plains - Midwestern United States	77	17 fatalities, 772 injuries	Included the 1965 Twin Cities tornado outbreak, in which a series of violent tornadoes struck the Twin Cities metro area on May 6, devastating Fridley and Golden Valley. A violent outbreak occurred on May 8 in Nebraska and South Dakota, including a massive F5 tornado in Tripp County and two long-tracked F4 tornadoes, one of which almost obliterated Primrose, killing four people. (37 significant, 9 violent, 5 killer)
Late-May 1965 tornado outbreak	May 25–27, 1965	Great Plains - Mississippi Valley	36	48 injuries	Produced multiple strong tornadoes in the Great Plains, including an F3 tornado near Pratt, Kansas. (9 significant)
1966 Candlestick Park tornado outbreak	March 3–4, 1966	Louisiana – Mississippi – Alabama – North Carolina	4	58 fatalities, 521 injuries	Outbreak produced the Candlestick Park tornado, which was an extremely violent F5 tornado or tornado family that killed 58 people and traveled 202.5 mi (325.9 km) across Mississippi and Alabama. It is one of the longest such paths on record and one of only four official F5 tornadoes to hit Mississippi. Three additional F1 tornadoes also touched down. (1 violent killer)
Tornado outbreak of April 4–5, 1966	April 4–5, 1966	Central Florida	2	11 fatalities, 530 injuries	Third-deadliest tornado event in Florida, behind those of February 2, 2007, and February 22–23, 1998. Produced at least two long-tracked tornadoes, including one of only two F4 tornadoes in Florida history, killing 11 people. Affected major urban areas in Tampa and Greater Orlando, but crossed the entire state as well. (2 significant, 1 violent killer)
Tornado outbreak sequence of June 1966	June 3–12, 1966	Kansas – Illinois	57	18 fatalities, 543 injuries	Outbreak sequence produced a series of tornadoes across the Great Plains states. An F5 tornado devastated downtown Topeka, Kansas, killing 16 people and disproving myths about the city's being protected. A large F3 tornado also hit Manhattan, Kansas. (23 significant, 3 violent, 3 killer)
Tornado outbreak of Mid–October 1966	October 14–15, 1966	Midwest	23	6 fatalities, 225 injuries	Unusually intense October outbreak spawned a deadly F5 tornado in Belmond, Iowa, although the rating is disputed. (15 significant, 1 violent killer)
Los Angeles tornadoes of November 7, 1966	November 7, 1966	Southern California	4	10 injuries	An extremely rare series of strong tornadoes struck Southern California with two F2 tornadoes striking Los Angeles.(3 significant)
1967 St. Louis tornado outbreak	January 24, 1967	Midwest	30	7 fatalities, 268 injuries	One of the most intense January outbreaks ever documented. F3+ tornadoes occurred as far north as Wisconsin. An F4 tornado killed three in the St. Louis suburbs, paralleling the paths of earlier tornadoes in 1896 and 1927. Two students were killed at a high school in Orrick, Missouri. (23 significant, 2 violent, 4 killer)
1967 Oak Lawn tornado outbreak	April 21, 1967	Midwest	45	58 fatalities, 1,118 injuries	One of the most intense outbreaks to hit the Chicago metropolitan area. An F4 tornado devastated Belvidere, Illinois, killing 13 people in a school (one of the highest such tolls in US history). Another very destructive F4 hit Oak Lawn, killing 33 people in rush-hour traffic. Other violent tornadoes touched down in Missouri and Michigan. (25 significant, 5 violent, 3 killer)
Tornado outbreak of April 30 – May 2, 1967	April 30-May 2, 1967	Midwest - Southern United States	38	13 fatalities, 90 injuries	Outbreak started in the Midwest, where only one known tornado was rated below F2 strength in Minnesota. The towns of Albert Lea and Waseca were devastated by deadly F4 tornadoes. Another outbreak of destructive outbreak of tornadoes hit the South during the second and third outbreak days. (29 significant, 4 violent, 3 killer)
Hurricane Beulah tornado outbreak	September 18–24, 1967	Texas	120	5 fatalities, 41 injuries	One of the largest tropical cyclone-related tornado outbreaks ever recorded. Produced several strong tornadoes, some of which were deadly. Also set the record for most tornadoes in one state within a 24-hour period. (14 significant, 2 killer)
Tornado outbreak of December 1–3, 1967	December 1–3, 1967	Southeastern United States	8	2 fatalities, 14 injuries	Active December produced three outbreaks with this being the first one. An F4 tornado killed two in Mississippi. (6 significant, 1 violent killer)
Tornado outbreak of December 10–11, 1967	December 10–11, 1967	Southeastern United States - Midwest	22	2 fatalities, 103 injuries	Active December produced three outbreaks with this being the second one. F2 and F3 tornadoes in Florida both killed one and injured 50. (12 significant, 2 killer)
Tornado outbreak sequence of December 17–21, 1967	December 17–21, 1967	Hawaii - Southwestern United States - Midwest - Southeastern United States	30	6 fatalities, 110 injuries	Active December produced three outbreaks with this one being the third and most severe of them. An F2 tornado killed two in Alabama, an F4 tornado killed three in Missouri and another F2 tornado killed one in Mississippi. (19 significant, 1 violent, 3 killer)
Tornado outbreak of April 21–24, 1968	April 21–24, 1968	Ohio Valley	14	14 fatalities	Outbreak produced several violent and killer tornadoes across the Ohio Valley, including two F4 tornadoes—one possibly reaching F5 intentsiy. An F5 tornado struck Wheelersburg and Gallipolis as well. The F5 rating is, however, disputed by some sources. (9 significant, 3 violent killer)
Tornado outbreak of May 1968	May 15–16, 1968	Mississippi Valley	46	74 fatalities	Two F5 tornadoes struck Iowa on the same day, killing 18 people. Two deadly F4 tornadoes struck Arkansas, including one that killed 35 people in Jonesboro. (21 significant, 4 violent, 8 killer)
1968 Tracy tornado	June 13, 1968	Midwest	11	9 fatalities, 167 injuries	Narrow, but powerful F5 tornado killed nine people and injured 150 in Tracy, Minnesota. Other strong tornadoes also touched down, including an F2 tornado that injured 17 people in Arnolds Park, Iowa. (4 significant, 1 violent killer)
1969 Hazlehurst, Mississippi tornadoes	January 23, 1969	Southeastern United States	3	32 fatalities	Devastating pre-dawn F4 tornado hit Hazlehurst and other towns, killing 32 people on a long path across southern Mississippi. (2 significant, 1 violent killer)
Tornado outbreak sequence of June 1969	June 21–26, 1969	Midwestern United States	63	7 fatalities, 169 injuries	Significant tornadoes struck the Midwest for six consecutive days. An F3 tornado caused major damage in Salina, Kansas, injuring 60 people. Two F4 tornadoes struck western Missouri, killing 6 people and injuring 77. (24 significant, 3 violent, 3 killer)
1969 Minnesota tornado outbreak	August 6, 1969	Minnesota	13	15 fatalities, 109 injuries	Mid-summer outbreak produced several destructive tornadoes in Minnesota. An F4 tornado killed 12 people near Outing. (11 significant, 1 violent, 3 killer)
Tornado outbreak sequence of August 8–10, 1969	August 8–10, 1969	Indiana – Ohio	21	4 fatalities, 257 injuries	F3 tornado killed 4 in the Cincinnati suburbs. Other strong tornadoes occurred in Indiana and Virginia. (8 significant, 1 killer)

=== 1970s ===
List of United States tornado outbreaks – 1970–1979
Outbreak	Dates	Region	Tornadoes	Casualties	Notes
Tornado outbreak sequence of April 17–19, 1970	April 17–19, 1970	Midwestern United States - Southern United States	33	26 fatalities, 68 injuries	A destructive outbreak sequence produced multiple violent, long-tracked tornadoes in the Llano Estacado and the Texas Panhandle. (17 significant, 5 violent, 4 killer)
Lubbock tornado	May 11, 1970	West Texas	5	26 fatalities, 500 injuries	A violent F5 tornado struck Downtown Lubbock, killing 26 people. Studies of this tornado led to the formation of the Fujita scale. Four other weak tornadoes also formed before the F5 tornado. (1 violent killer)
Tornado outbreak sequence of June 10–16, 1970	June 10–16, 1970	Central United States	82	3 fatalities, 73 injuries	A large outbreak sequence of 82 tornadoes touched down across the Great Plains and Midwest. The outbreak sequence featured a long–tracked F3 tornado that struck Springdale, Arkansas, and an F4 tornado near Bynumville, Missouri. One tornado near Macon, Missouri, featured an oddity where a welcome mat made an imprint on the side of a house. (26 significant, 1 violent, 3 killer)
Tornado outbreak of February 21–22, 1971	February 21–22, 1971	Southern Mississippi Valley	19	123 fatalities, 1,592 injuries	A deadly outbreak produced multiple long-track, violent tornadoes, or tornado families, across Mississippi Delta region, including the only known F5 tornado in Louisiana history, although the rating is disputed, and it may have been a tornado family rather than a single tornado. The tornado continued into Mississippi and killed 21 people in Inverness, a large section of which was also destroyed. An F4 tornado (which was likely a tornado family) traveled 202 mi (325 km) across northern and central Mississippi, destroying several entire communities and killing 58 people, including 21 alone in Pugh City, which was entirely destroyed and never rebuilt.(13 significant, 3 violent, 5 killer)
Tornado outbreak of December 14–15, 1971	December 14–15, 1971	Great Plains - Midwest - Mississippi Valley	40	2 fatalities, 119 injuries	Multiple tornadoes pummeled Dallas–Fort Worth and Springfield, Missouri metropolitan areas during the massive outbreak. One long-tracked F2 tornado on December 14 passed through the Western suburbs of Springfield, Missouri, killing one and injuring 22. (19 significant, 2 killer)
1972 Portland–Vancouver tornadoes	April 5, 1972	Oregon - Washington	4	6 fatalities, 301 injuries	The most intense outbreak ever recorded in the Pacific Northwest. An F3 tornado struck Portland, Oregon, and Vancouver, Washington, becoming the deadliest West Coast tornado event ever documented. (4 significant, 1 killer)
Hurricane Agnes tornado outbreak	June 18–19, 1972	Florida and Georgia	19	7 fatalities, ≥ 135 injuries	This was the third-deadliest tropical cyclone-related outbreak in the U.S. since 1900 and as well as the deadliest such tornado outbreak on record in Florida. (11 significant, 2 killer)
Tornado outbreak of September 28–30, 1972	September 28–30, 1972	Midwest - Southeastern United States	13	30 injuries	An F4 tornado hit the Chicago suburbs, destroying military barracks, although the rating is disputed. (6 significant, 1 violent)
Tornado outbreak sequence of April 19–21, 1973	April 19–21, 1973	Southern United States - Midwest	68	2 fatalities, 106 injuries	Large outbreak sequence produced multiple destructive tornadoes. An F3 tornado killed one in Arkansas and an F4 tornado killed another in Missouri. (38 significant, 3 violent, 2 killer)
Tornado outbreak of May 6–8, 1973	May 6–8, 1973	Great Plains - Midwest - Southeastern United States	47	2 fatalities, 41 injuries	Destructive outbreak sequence spawned a violent F5 tornado in Texas, a damaging F3 tornado in Missouri, and a deadly F2 tornado in Alabama. (23 significant, 1 violent, 1 killer)
Tornado outbreak sequence of May 22–31, 1973	May 22–31, 1973	Great Plains - Midwest - Southern United States - Hawaii	145	24 fatalities, 820 injuries	A massive and destructive 8-day period of tornadoes occurred. All four F4 tornadoes were killers, including a well-documented tornado that killed two and injured four in Union City, Oklahoma and another in central Alabama that killed seven and injured 199. Combined, the F4 tornadoes killed 17 and injured 517 alone. (55 significant, 4 violent, 9 killer)
Tornado outbreak of April 1–2, 1974	April 1–2, 1974	Southern U.S. – Mississippi Valley	23	4 fatalities, 72 injuries	A destructive outbreak ended only 17 hours before the Super Outbreak began in the same areas. (10 significant, 3 violent, 4 killer)
1974 Super Outbreak	April 3–4, 1974	Eastern United States – Ontario	148	315 fatalities	The second-largest and most violent tornado outbreak ever documented. At least 50 of them were killers. Violent and deadly tornadoes, several of which were long lived, touched down over a wide area from Alabama to Indiana, affecting major population areas including Louisville, Cincinnati, and Huntsville. A violent F5 tornado destroyed Brandenburg, Kentucky, and killed 31, and another F5 tornado destroyed a large section of Xenia, Ohio, killing 32. Three F5 tornadoes occurred in Alabama, including one of the strongest tornadoes on record, a long-tracked F5 tornado that obliterated a large section of Guin, killing 28 people, 20 of them in Guin alone. Additionally, two other powerful F5 tornadoes devastated the town of Tanner a half hour apart and killed total of 50 people. Numerous other violent, killer, long-tracked tornadoes occurred from the Great Lakes to the Gulf Coast, including an extremely long-tracked F4 tornado that traveled almost 110 mi (180 km) and killed 18 people in northern Indiana. Strong, deadly tornadoes occurred as far north as Ontario (where an F3 tornado touched down) as well. The outbreak produced the most violent tornadoes ever recorded in an outbreak with 30 rated either F4 or F5. (98 significant, 30 violent, 50 killer)
Tornado outbreak of June 8, 1974	June 8, 1974	Southern Great Plains	36	22 fatalities, 477 injuries	Several significant tornadoes occurred over the southern Great Plains, including two violent, killer F4 tornadoes that hit Oklahoma and Kansas. One of the tornadoes struck Drumright in Oklahoma, killing 14 people, while the other killed six in and near Emporia, Kansas. Other strong, F3 tornadoes affected the Oklahoma City and Tulsa metropolitan areas. (22 significant, 2 violent, 3 killer)
Great Storm of 1975	January 9–12, 1975	Southeastern United States	45	12 fatalities, 377 injuries	A large January outbreak produced a violent F4 tornado that killed nine people in McComb, Mississippi. An F3 tornado east of Birmingham, Alabama, destroyed numerous homes and killed one person. (16 significant, 1 violent, 4 killer)
1975 Omaha tornado outbreak	May 6–7, 1975	Northern Great Plains	36	3 fatalities, 137+ injured	A violent F4 tornado struck Omaha, Nebraska, killed three people and was one of the costliest tornado disasters in US history. Another F4 tornado destroyed the town of Magnet, Nebraska. (19 significant, 2 violent, 1 killer)
1975 Canton, Illinois, tornado	July 23, 1975	Illinois	3	2+ fatalities, 69 injuries	A high-end F3 tornado destroyed downtown Canton, Illinois. (2 significant, 1 killer)
Tornado outbreak of March 20–21, 1976	March 20–21, 1976	Mississippi Valley - Great Lakes - Southeastern United States - Mid-Atlantic	66	3 fatalities, 189 injuries	Several destructive tornadoes touched down in Illinois, Indiana, and Michigan. This included a violent F4 tornado in the suburbs of Detroit. (18 significant, 3 violent, 3 killer)
Tornado outbreak of March 26, 1976	March 26, 1976	Great Plains - Midwest - Mississippi Valley	17	4 fatalities, 89 injuries	Killer F4 and F5 (rating disputed) tornadoes occurred in Oklahoma with a killer F3 tornado in Missouri. Other damaging tornadoes also touched down as well. (9 significant, 2 violent, 3 killer)
Tornado outbreak of April 1977	April 4–5, 1977	Southeastern United States	21	24 fatalities, 200 injuries	Violent F5 tornado struck the Smithfield area in northern Birmingham, Alabama, sweeping away many homes and killing 22 people. Outbreak extended from Mississippi to North Carolina, with several strong tornadoes documented. The storm system also caused the crash of Southern Airways Flight 242, which killed 72 and injured 22. (5 significant, 2 violent, 5 killer)
Tornado outbreak of May 4, 1978	May 4, 1978	Florida - South Carolina - South Dakota - Texas	15	3 fatalities, 102 injuries	An F3 tornado struck an elementary school in Clearwater, Florida, killing three students and an F2 tornado struck Gainesville, Florida. (2 significant, 1 killer)
1978 Bossier City tornado outbreak	December 3, 1978	Southeastern United States	11	5 fatalities, 277 injuries	An F4 tornado struck Bossier City, Louisiana, causing two deaths and 266 injuries. (8 significant, 1 violent, 3 killer)
1979 Red River Valley tornado outbreak	April 10–12, 1979	Southern Great Plains – Southeastern United States	60	58 fatalities, 1,927 injuries	A deadly outbreak produced multiple killer tornadoes across the southern Great Plains states, including a famous, devastating, F4 wedge tornado that killed 42 people in Wichita Falls, Texas. Another deadly F4 tornado occurred in Vernon, Texas. (31 significant, 2 violent, 5 killer)
Tornado outbreak of October 2–3, 1979	October 2–3, 1979	Virginia - West Virginia - Pennsylvania -Wisconsin- Connecticut	7	3 fatalities, 501 injuries	A rare New England and October F4 tornado, one of the costliest tornadoes in US history, struck Windsor Locks, Connecticut. Six other tornadoes touched down prior to the violent tornado, including an F1 tornado that injured one person west of Martinsburg, West Virginia. (2 significant, 1 violent killer)

=== 1980s ===
List of United States tornado outbreaks – 1980–1989
Outbreak	Dates	Region	Tornadoes	Casualties	Notes
April 1980 Central United States tornado outbreak	April 7–8, 1980	Central United States	59	3 fatalities	Many strong tornadoes touched down, including an F3 that struck Round Rock, Texas, killing 1. (31 significant, 2 killer)
1980 Kalamazoo tornado	May 13, 1980	Michigan	1	5 fatalities	F3 struck downtown Kalamazoo, Michigan, killing 5 people.
1980 Grand Island tornado outbreak	June 2–3, 1980	Central – Eastern United States	29	6 fatalities	Grand Island, Nebraska, was devastated by a series of damaging tornadoes. Best known for forming three rare anticyclonic tornadoes in one system. Outbreak produced violent tornadoes as far east as Pennsylvania. (16 significant, 3 violent, 4 killer)
Hurricane Allen	August 8–11, 1980	Mexico – Texas	29	0 fatalities	Costliest tropical cyclone-related tornado in history struck the Austin area.
1981 West Bend tornado	April 4, 1981	Wisconsin	1	3 fatalities	One of the strongest anticyclonic tornadoes on record, rated F4.
Tornado outbreak of May 22–23, 1981	May 22–23, 1981	Great Plains	43	0 fatalities	Multiple strong tornadoes touched down across the Great Plains. Spawned the Cordell and Binger, Oklahoma, tornadoes, the latter of which was a violent F4. (14 significant, 1 violent)
Tornado outbreak of April 2–3, 1982	April 2–3, 1982	Southern Plains – Mississippi Valley	61	29 fatalities	Produced an F5 tornado near Broken Bow, Oklahoma, though the rating is disputed. An F4 tornado also struck Paris, Texas, and another occurred in Arkansas. (24 significant, 4 violent, 10 killer)
May 1982 tornado outbreak	May 11–12, 1982	Texas – Oklahoma	70	3 fatalities	Produced killer tornadoes in Texas and Oklahoma. (17 significant, 2 killer)
Marion, Illinois tornado outbreak	May 29, 1982	Illinois	7	10 fatalities	Produced an F4 that killed 10 people in Marion, Illinois. (3 significant, 1 violent killer)
Early-December 1982 tornado outbreak	December 2–3, 1982	Lower-Middle Mississippi Valley	43	4 fatalities	(16 significant, 2 killer)
1982 Christmas tornado outbreak	December 23–25, 1982	Central – Southeastern United States	43	3 fatalities	(18 significant, 3 killer)
March 1983 South Florida tornadoes	March 17, 1983	Southern Florida	2	0 fatalities	Produced an unusually long-lived tornado across the Everglades and urban Broward County, Florida. An F1 tornado also hit Collier County. Other tornadoes may have occurred across southern Florida as well. (2 tornadoes, 1 significant, 3 unconfirmed)
Early-May 1983 tornado outbreak	May 1–2, 1983	Mississippi Valley – Great Lakes	63	7 fatalities, 110+ injured	Affected 11 states with $200 million in damage, Ohio and western New York hardest hit. (27 significant, 5 killer)
May 12–23, 1983 tornado outbreak sequence	May 12–23, 1983		157	6 fatalities, 122 injuries	A series of outbreaks occurred, spawning tornadoes from Texas to Michigan. An F3 hit Pine Bluff, Arkansas on May 14, injuring two. On May 20–21, an outbreak affected Texas and Louisiana, killing six; three F2's touched down in Harris County, Texas, killing three. An F1 killed one southeast of Brenham and another F2 killed one near Nederland. In Louisiana, an F3 tore a 12-mile path from Urania to Clarks, killing one.
1984 Carolinas tornado outbreak	March 28, 1984	Carolinas	24	57 fatalities, 1200+ injuries	Long-lived supercell tracked near the center of a low pressure center and generated 13 tornadoes, 11 of which were F3 or F4 in strength. Two F4s left damage paths more than 2 mi (3.2 km) wide. Worst tornado outbreak ever recorded in the Carolinas. Winnsboro and Bennettsville, South Carolina, along with Red Springs and Greenville, North Carolina, were devastated. (19 significant, 7 violent, 10 killer)
1984 Philipp-Water Valley, Mississippi tornado outbreak	April 21, 1984	Southeastern United States	7	15 fatalities	Produced a multiple-vortex F3 with an unusual V-shaped path that struck Water Valley, Mississippi, killing 15. (3 significant, 1 killer)
1984 Morris, Oklahoma tornado outbreak	April 26–27, 1984	Great Plains – Mississippi Valley	47	16 fatalities	Produced many strong to violent tornadoes, especially in Oklahoma and Wisconsin, where a F4 moved through Milwaukee's western suburbs and killed one person. (20 significant, 8 killer)
1984 Mannford-New Prue, Oklahoma tornado outbreak	April 29, 1984	Central United States	42	1 fatality	New Prue was devastated by an F4, killing 1. (4 significant, 1 violent killer)
May 1984 tornado outbreak	May 2–3, 1984	Southeastern United States	60	5 fatalities	(15 significant, 1 killer)
1984 Barneveld tornado outbreak	June 7–8, 1984	Central United States	45	13 fatalities	Numerous strong tornadoes touched down across the northern Plains states. Late-night F5 killed nine people in Barneveld, Wisconsin. Long-track F4 killed three in Missouri. (29 significant, 2 violent, 3 killer)
1985 United States–Canada tornado outbreak	May 31, 1985	U.S. – Canadian Eastern Great Lakes	44	90 fatalities	Unusual tornado outbreak was among the most intense recorded, the largest such outbreak in the region. Violent tornadoes devastated towns in Ohio, Pennsylvania, New York, and Ontario. Long-track tornado produced F5 damage in Ohio and Pennsylvania, killing 18. Two F4s occurred in Canada, including one that killed eight people in Barrie, Ontario. (28 significant, 9 violent, 12 killer)
Hurricane Danny	August 1985	Southeastern United States	39	1 fatalities	Produced an F3 that struck Eva, Alabama. (13 significant, 1 killer)
Tornado outbreak of March 10-12, 1986	March 10–12, 1986	Central – Southeastern United States	41	6 fatalities	High-end F2 tornado struck Lexington, Kentucky. (24 significant, 1 violent, 5 killer)
July 1986 tornado outbreak	July 1986	Minnesota	36	2 fatalities	Produced F4 tornado struck Minnesota. An F2 which hit the Twin Cities suburbs of Brooklyn Park and Fridley on July 18, 1986, was carried live on KARE-TV and became a media sensation. This tornado caused limited damage and no deaths.
1987 Saragosa, Texas tornado	May 22, 1987	West Texas	3	30 fatalities	Brief but violent F4 tornado devastated the small town of Saragosa, killing 30 people.
Teton–Yellowstone tornado	July 21, 1987	Wyoming	1	0 fatalities	Rare high-altitude F4 tore through parts of Yellowstone National Park, flattening acres of forest.
1987 Arklatex tornado outbreak	November 15–16, 1987	Southeastern United States	50	12 fatalities	Produced a series of strong tornadoes across Oklahoma, Texas, and Mississippi. (18 significant, 6 killer)
1987 West Memphis, Arkansas tornado	December 14, 1987	Arkansas – Tennessee	1	6 dead, 100 injured	Rated F3.
May 1988 tornado outbreak	May 8, 1988	Midwest	57	0 fatalities	(8 significant)
Hurricane Gilbert	September 16–17, 1988	Central – North America	41	1 fatalities	Produced several tornadoes in Texas. (2 significant, 1 killer)
1988 Raleigh tornado outbreak	November 28, 1988	North Carolina	7	4 fatalities	Produced a long-track F4 that struck Raleigh, North Carolina, killing four people. A few other less significant tornadoes occurred as well. (3 significant, 1 violent killer)
May 1989 tornado outbreak	May 5, 1989	Mid-Atlantic – Southeast U.S.	16	7 fatalities	Produced three killer F4s in the Carolinas. The Charlotte, Winston-Salem, and Durham, North Carolina, areas all sustained major impacts. (9 significant, 3 violent killer)
1989 Northeastern United States tornado outbreak	July 10, 1989	Northeastern United States	17	0 fatalities, 142 injured	One of the most intense tornado events to ever impact the New England region. Destructive tornadoes touched down in New York and Connecticut, including a violent F4 that devastated Hamden, Connecticut. (6 significant, 2 violent)
November 1989 tornado outbreak	November 15–16, 1989	Southeastern United States and Mid-Atlantic States	40	21 fatalities	Produced a deadly F4 that struck Huntsville, Alabama, at rush hour. Strong tornadoes touched down as far north as Quebec. (10 significant, 1 violent, 2 killer)

=== 1990s ===
List of United States tornado outbreaks – 1990–1999
Outbreak	Dates	Region	Tornadoes	Casualties	Notes
March 1990 Central United States tornado outbreak	March 11–13, 1990	Central United States	64	2 fatalities	The most violent March outbreak and the most intense Great Plains outbreak to occur so early in the year. Produced two powerful F5 tornadoes near Hesston and Goessel, Kansas. A long-tracked F4 tornado, possibly a family of tornadoes, occurred near Red Cloud, Nebraska. (27 significant, 4 violent, 2 killer)
June 1990 Lower Ohio Valley tornado outbreak	June 2–3, 1990	Central United States	66	9 fatalities	Outbreak produced many strong to violent tornadoes across the Ohio Valley. An F4 tornado devastated Petersburg, Indiana, killing six people. Another very long lived F4 tornado was on the ground for 106 miles across Illinois and Indiana. A late night F4 tornado impacted the northern sections of the Cincinnati metro as well. (27 significant, 7 violent, 4 killer)
1990 Plainfield tornado	August 28, 1990	Northeastern Illinois	13	29 fatalities	Produced some of the most intense vegetation scouring ever documented. Strongest August tornado, though only rated F5 based on corn damage. F4 damage occurred to buildings in Plainfield, Illinois, killing 29 people. Was part of a small outbreak that also produced strong tornadoes in Ontario and New York. (4 significant, 1 violent killer)
1991 Great Plains tornado outbreak	April 26–27, 1991	Central-Southern Great Plains	58	21 fatalities	One of the most intense Plains outbreaks on record, produced five violent tornadoes in Oklahoma and Kansas. A very violent F5 tornado killed 17 people in the Wichita metropolitan area at Andover, Kansas, destroying an entire mobile-home park. A long-tracked F4 tornado near Red Rock, Oklahoma, produced Doppler-indicated winds into the F5 range. Three other F4 tornadoes occurred in Kansas and Oklahoma. (32 significant, 6 violent, 5 killer)
May 1991 Central Plains tornado outbreak	May 16, 1991	Central Great Plains	46	0 fatalities	(4 significant)
Tornado outbreak of June 14–18, 1992	June 14–18, 1992	Central United States	170	1 fatality	Large outbreak produced many strong to violent tornadoes, mainly across the Northern Plains states. A large F5 tornado devastated the town of Chandler, Minnesota, killing one person. (27 significant, 4 violent, 1 killer)
Tornado outbreak of November 21–23, 1992	November 21–23, 1992	Southern – Eastern United States	95	26 fatalities	The most intense and largest November outbreak on record in U.S. history. Produced strong tornadoes from Texas to North Carolina and into the Ohio Valley, including a long-track F4 tornado that impacted Brandon, Mississippi, and killed 12 people. A series of destructive tornadoes (including one rated F4) devastated the Houston metro area as well. (43 significant, 5 violent, 9 killer)
1993 Storm of the Century	March 12–14, 1993	Florida	11	5 fatalities	A serial derecho on the south-side of the larger extratropical low produced several tornadoes including three rated F2. Tornadoes also struck Tampa and Jacksonville. (3 significant, 3 killer)
1993 Catoosa, Oklahoma tornado outbreak	April 24, 1993	Oklahoma	13	7 fatalities	A rain-wrapped F4 tornado killed seven people in the suburbs of Tulsa, and a destructive F3 tornado paralleled its path. (4 significant, 1 violent killer)
1993 Virginia tornado outbreak	August 6, 1993	Virginia	24	4 fatalities	Largest tornado outbreak in Virginia history. Produced a violent F4 tornado that struck downtown Petersburg, Virginia, and killed four people. (4 significant, 1 violent killer)
Tornado outbreak of August 8–9, 1993	August 8–9, 1993	Northern Plains	7	2 fatalities	Small outbreak that resulted in two fatalities in Minnesota. (1 significant, 1 killer)
1994 Palm Sunday tornado outbreak	March 27, 1994	Southeastern United States	29	40 fatalities	Produced multiple violent tornadoes across the Southeastern U.S., including one that killed 20 people in a church near Piedmont, Alabama. Last of the three famous Palm Sunday outbreaks. (2 violent, 13 significant, 5 killer)
Tornado outbreak of April 25–27, 1994	April 25–27, 1994	Southern Great Plains – Midwest	101	6 fatalities	Large and widespread outbreak. An F4 tornado devastated the Dallas suburb of Lancaster, Texas, killing 3 people there. Another F4 tornado that struck West Lafayette, Indiana, killed three as well. (12 significant, 2 violent killer)
June 1994 tornado outbreak	June 26–27, 1994	–	62	2 fatalities	(11 significant, 2 killer)
1994 Thanksgiving Weekend tornado outbreak	November 27, 1994	Southeastern United States	19	6 fatalities	Produced several strong tornadoes across the South. (32 significant, 6 violent, 5 killer)
Tornado outbreak sequence of May 6–27, 1995	May 5–27, 1995	Central United States	351	13 fatalities	Very large outbreak sequence produced many strong to violent tornadoes. An F4 tornado struck Harvest, Alabama, and killed one person, and another F4 tornado struck Ethridge, Tennessee, and killed three. A tornado rated F3 killed three people and caused major damage in the Ardmore, Oklahoma, area. The outbreak sequence produced an F0 tornado that downed several trees at the National Arboretum in Washington D.C. (57 significant, 8 violent, 6 killer)
1995 Great Barrington tornado	May 29, 1995	Massachusetts	2	3 fatalities	Strong tornado caused three fatalities in a vehicle that was thrown near Great Barrington, Massachusetts. (2 significant, 1 violent killer)
June 8, 1995 Texas tornado outbreak	June 8, 1995	Texas, Oklahoma, Arkansas, Missouri, Idaho, North Carolina, Arkansas	29	0 fatalities, 11 injuries	This outbreak produced 3 F4s, the most well known being the Pampa, Texas tornado that directly hit the city.
Tornado outbreak sequence of April 1996	April 19–22, 1996	Texas – Arkansas – Illinois – Indiana – Ontario	117	6 fatalities	Large outbreak sequence. Multiple towns in Illinois sustained major damage, with one death occurring in Ogden. An F3-rated tornado devastated downtown Fort Smith, Arkansas, killing 2. Two F3 tornadoes also caused severe damage in Ontario. (29 significant, 4 killer)
1996 Oakfield tornado outbreak	July 18, 1996	Wisconsin	12	1 fatality	F5 tornado. Was part of a small mid-Summer outbreak that occurred in Wisconsin. An F2 tornado killed one person in Marytown, Wisconsin. (2 significant, 1 violent, 1 killer)
Late-October 1996 tornado outbreak	October 26, 1996	West North Central States	26	11 injuries	Unusual late-season outbreak in Minnesota, South Dakota, and Nebraska. Homes were destroyed near Lobster Lake, Minnesota and Albany, Minnesota. (5 significant)
Tornado outbreak of January 23–24, 1997	January 23–24, 1997	Deep South	16	1 fatality	Tornadoes touched down across several states in the Southern United States. An F4 destroyed homes in and near Murfreesboro, Tennessee. An F2 tornado killed one person in Tuscaloosa, Alabama. (10 significant, 1 violent, 1 killer)
March 1997 tornado outbreak	February 28-March 1, 1997	Mississippi Valley – Ohio Valley	56	26 fatalities	Many strong tornadoes touched down across the south, especially in Arkansas. Produced a devastating F4 tornado that began near Benton and struck Shannon Hills, Arkansas, killing 15 people along the path. An F4 tornado struck Arkadelphia, killing six. (16 significant, 3 violent, 5 killer)
1997 Miami tornado	May 12, 1997	Miami, Florida	1	0 fatalities	Widely photographed F1 tornado struck downtown Miami, Florida.
1997 Central Texas tornado outbreak	May 27, 1997	Texas	20	28 fatalities	Produced a remarkably damaging, deadly F5 tornado in Jarrell, Texas. Based on the damage, it may have been the strongest tornado ever recorded (though no mobile radar measurements were taken to confirm this). An F4 devastated neighborhoods near Lake Travis, and an F3 tornado caused major damage in Cedar Park. (8 significant, 2 violent killer)
1997 Southeast Michigan tornado outbreak	July 1–3, 1997	Southeast Michigan – Southwestern Ontario	52	2 fatalities (+5 non-tornadic)	An F2 tornado passed through some Detroit neighborhoods, the suburbs of Hamtramck, and Highland Park. One also touched down near Windsor, Ontario, site of an F3 tornado in the 1974 Super Outbreak. F3 tornadoes caused major damage near Clio and Thetford Center, with a fatality occurring at the latter of the two locations. Other strong tornadoes touched down in Minnesota and New England. (13 significant, 2 killer)
1998 Kissimmee tornado outbreak	February 22–23, 1998	Florida	11	42 fatalities	Deadliest and most destructive Florida outbreak on record. The outbreak produced three F3 tornadoes, including a long-tracked tornado near Kissimmee that was initially rated F4. Nighttime occurrence made the death toll high. (5 significant, 4 killer)
1998 Gainesville–Stoneville tornado outbreak	March 20, 1998	Georgia to Virginia	12	14 fatalities	An early-morning F3 tornado passed near Gainesville, Georgia, and killed 12 people. Another F3 tornado struck Mayodan and Stoneville, North Carolina, killing two. (4 significant, 2 killer)
1998 Comfrey–St. Peter tornado outbreak	March 29, 1998	Southern Minnesota	16	2 fatalities, 36 injuries	Earliest tornado outbreak in Minnesota history. A long-track F4-rated wedge struck Comfrey, Minnesota, killing one person. An F3 tornado struck St. Peter, Minnesota, causing another fatality. Le Center, Minnesota, sustained major damage from a large F2 tornado. (7 significant, 1 violent, 2 killer)
Tornado outbreak of April 6–9, 1998	April 6–9, 1998	Metropolitan area of Birmingham, Alabama; also Georgia, Louisiana, Tennessee	62	41 fatalities	Produced a violent nighttime F5 tornado that moved through several suburbs of Birmingham, Alabama, killing 32 people. Other killer tornadoes touched down in Georgia. (10 significant, 1 violent, 5 killer)
Tornado outbreak of April 15–16, 1998	April 15–16, 1998	Southeastern United States	63	12 fatalities	F3 tornado passed through downtown Nashville, killing one person. Numerous other strong tornadoes occurred across the South, including an extremely violent one rated F5 near Lawrenceburg, Tennessee. An F4 tornado devastated the town of Manila, Arkansas, killing two. (21 significant, 4 violent, 7 killer)
Late-May 1998 tornado outbreak and derecho	May 30–31, 1998	South Dakota, Great Lakes, New York, Pennsylvania	60	7 fatalities (+6 non-tornadic)	Large and dynamic outbreak produced many strong tornadoes, some of which were embedded in an extremely intense derecho. A large F4 wedge tornado devastated Spencer, South Dakota, killing six. Produced an unusually intense outbreak of tornadoes across Pennsylvania and New York, with multiple F2 and F3-rated tornadoes. (4 significant, 1 violent, 2 killer)
Tornado outbreak of June 2, 1998	June 2, 1998	New York to South Carolina	49	2 fatalities, 80 injuries	Unusually severe outbreak affected mainly the northeastern states just days after a similar outbreak affected roughly the same region (see previous event). Produced a large F4 tornado that struck Frostburg, Maryland. Caused $42M in damage. (10 significant, 1 violent, 1 killer)
Tornado outbreak of June 13, 1998	June 13, 1998	Central United States, North Carolina, Wyoming	45	26 injuries	Tornadoes affected six different states, with Kansas, Nebraska, and Oklahoma receiving most of the tornadoes. A tornado struck downtown Sabetha, Kansas, and a series of tornadoes struck the North Oklahoma City area. (3 significant)
Upper Great Lakes severe weather outbreak of August 23, 1998	August 23, 1998	Wisconsin, Michigan	3	1 fatality (non-tornadic)	Spawned the F3 Door County tornado, the eighth costliest in Wisconsin history. (1 significant)
Hurricane Georges tornado outbreak	September 24–30, 1998	Southern US	47	36 injuries	Produced many tornadoes. Most were weak, though an F2 tornado caused major damage in the Live Oak, Florida, area. (1 significant)
1998 Oklahoma tornado outbreak	October 4, 1998	Oklahoma	19	5 injuries	A late-year autumn outbreak, it was the largest October tornado outbreak in Oklahoma history. (8 significant)
Tornado outbreak of January 17–18, 1999	January 17–18, 1999	Arkansas, Tennessee, Mississippi	24	8 fatalities	Strong and deadly tornadoes touched down in Tennessee, including an F3 and an F4 tornado that struck Jackson, killing six. A similar but even larger outbreak occurred just days later (see next event). (6 significant, 1 violent, 3 killer)
Tornado outbreak of January 21–23, 1999	January 21–23, 1999	Louisiana, Arkansas, Tennessee, Mississippi	127	9 fatalities	Largest January outbreak on record. An F3 tornado passed near downtown Little Rock, Arkansas, killing three. A tornado rated F3 devastated Beebe, Arkansas, killing two. Other strong tornadoes struck Tennessee and Mississippi. (23 significant, 1 violent, 5 killer)
Tornado outbreak of April 2–3, 1999	April 2–3, 1999	Southern Plains	17	7 fatalities	Small but intense outbreak produced several strong tornadoes. An F4 tornado devastated Benton, Louisiana, killing seven. The town of Logansport, Louisiana, was severely damaged by an F3 tornado. (4 significant, 1 violent killer)
Tornado outbreak of April 8–9, 1999	April 8–9, 1999	Ohio Valley/Midwest	54	6 fatalities	Produced an F4 tornado that moved through the Cincinnati suburbs, killing 4. Two F4 tornadoes also touched down in Iowa. (15 significant, 3 violent, 3 killer)
1999 Great Plains tornado outbreak	May 2–5, 1999	Southern Great Plains	141	46 fatalities, 665 injuries	Produced one of the strongest documented tornadoes, an F5-rated tornado in the Oklahoma City metropolitan area with Doppler winds remotely sensed at 321 mph (517 km/h) near Bridge Creek, among the highest winds known to have occurred near the Earth's surface. First tornado to incur $1 billion in (non-normalized) damages. Other violent tornadoes occurred, including those near Mulhall, Oklahoma, and Wichita, Kansas. (≥17 significant, ≥4 violent, ≥5 killer)
1999 Salt Lake City tornado	August 11, 1999	Utah	1	1 fatality	An F2 tornado hit downtown Salt Lake City, causing the second known fatality in a Utah tornado.

=== 2000s ===
List of United States tornado outbreaks – 2000–2009
Outbreak	Dates	Region	Tornadoes	Fatalities	Notes
Tornado outbreak of February 13–14, 2000	February 13–14, 2000	Georgia	17	18	Produced a series of strong and deadly tornadoes that struck areas in and around Camilla, Meigs, and Omega, Georgia. Weaker tornadoes impacted other states.
2000 Fort Worth tornado outbreak	March 28, 2000	Texas	10	2	Small outbreak produced an F3 that hit downtown Fort Worth, Texas, severely damaging skyscrapers and killing two. Another F3 caused major damage in Arlington and Grand Prairie.
Tornado outbreak of April 23, 2000	April 23, 2000	Oklahoma, Texas, Louisiana, Arkansas	33	0	Tornado outbreak occurred on Easter Sunday.
Tornado outbreak of December 16, 2000	December 16, 2000	Southern United States	24	12	Small outbreak produced an F4 that struck Tuscaloosa, Alabama, killing 11. An F3 devastated Coats Bend, Alabama, and an F2 caused major damage and 1 fatality in Geneva, Alabama.
Tornado outbreak of February 24–25, 2001	February 24–25, 2001	Southern United States	25	7	An F2 killed one person near Union, Arkansas. An F3 caused major damage near Reed, Arkansas, and another long-tracked F3 devastated multiple towns in Mississippi and killed 6 people in Pontotoc.
Tornado outbreak of April 10–11, 2001	April 10–11, 2001	Great Plains Midwest	79	4	Widespread outbreak produced numerous tornadoes, some strong. F2 caused major damage in the town of Agency, Iowa, and killed two people. Other tornado-related fatalities occurred in Missouri and Oklahoma. Outbreak produced one of the worst hailstorms ever documented.
Tornado outbreak of June 13, 2001	June 13, 2001	Central Plains	36	0	Outbreak of mostly weak tornadoes, though a few were strong. An F3 tornado caused major damage near Parkers Prairie, Minnesota, and a large F2 occurred near Brainerd. An F4 completely destroyed a farmstead near Ruby, Nebraska.
Tornado outbreak of June 18, 2001	June 18, 2001	Iowa, Nebraska, Minnesota, Wisconsin	5	3	An F3 tornado killed three people in Siren, Wisconsin, and caused an estimated US$10 million in damage.
Tornado outbreak of September 24, 2001	September 24, 2001	Virginia, Maryland, Pennsylvania	9	2	Multiple-vortex F3 tornado passed through the University of Maryland campus and multiple DC suburbs, killing two people. An F4 also occurred near Rixeyville, Virginia. Other weaker tornadoes were observed as well, including an F1 that struck Washington, D.C.
Tornado outbreak of October 9, 2001	October 9, 2001	Great Plains	30	0	Unusual October outbreak in the Great Plains produced multiple strong tornadoes in Nebraska and Oklahoma. A large F3 devastated the town of Cordell, Oklahoma.
Tornado outbreak of October 24, 2001	October 24, 2001	Central United States	25	2	Most of the tornadoes in this outbreak were embedded in a squall line. An F3 hit Crumstown, Indiana, killing one. An F2 near LaPorte, Indiana, caused a fatality as well.
Tornado outbreak of November 23–24, 2001	November 23–24, 2001	Southeast U.S.	68	13	One of the strongest November outbreaks ever recorded. Produced three F4s, including one that struck Madison, Mississippi, killing 2. An F3 struck Wilmot, Arkansas, killing 3.
Tornado outbreak of April 27–28, 2002	April 27–28, 2002	Midwest to Mid-Atlantic U.S.	49	6	Produced several strong tornadoes across the Midwest, including an F3 that caused major damage in Dongola, Illinois, and killed one person. Also produced a few strong tornadoes in Maryland, including an F4 that devastated the town of La Plata and killed three.
Tornado outbreak of June 23, 2002	June 23, 2002	Brown County, South Dakota	6	0	A powerful supercell thunderstorm spawned six tornadoes, including an intense F3 and a violent F4, during the early evening hours. There were no fatalities or serious injuries, but the storm did over a million dollars in damage. (2 significant, 1 violent)
2002 Veterans Day weekend tornado outbreak	November 9–11, 2002	Southeastern United States – Ohio Valley	83	36	Very large and deadly outbreak produced multiple killer tornadoes across the Ohio Valley and Southeastern United States over the Veteran's Day weekend. A violent F4 hit Van Wert, Ohio, killing four people. Deadly F3 also hit Mossy Grove, Tennessee, killing seven. Two long-track F3s moved across northern Alabama, killing 11 people.
Tornado outbreak of March 17–20, 2003	March 17–20, 2003	Great Plains – Southern United States	28	7	Camilla, Georgia, was devastated by an F3 for the second time in 4 years, killing 4. An F2 killed 2 people near Bridgeboro, Georgia. Many other weaker tornadoes touched down as well.
Tornado outbreak sequence of May 2003	May 3–11, 2003	Great Plains - Southern United States	401	42	Large series of strong to violent tornadoes across the Great Plains and South. Two F4s struck the Kansas City metropolitan area, including one that killed two. In Missouri, the towns of Pierce City, Stockton, and Carl Junction were devastated by killer tornadoes. An F4 destroyed Franklin, Kansas, killing four, and another F4 struck downtown Jackson, Tennessee, killing eleven. A large F4 also caused major damage in southeastern Oklahoma City with additional damage in nearby areas.
2003 South Dakota tornado outbreak	June 21–24, 2003	South Dakota	125	2	Tied U.S. record for most tornadoes in one state during a 24-hour period, with 67 tornadoes in South Dakota on the 24th. Produced a violent F4 that wiped Manchester, South Dakota, off the map. In Nebraska, an F4 killed one person near Coleridge, and an F2 caused another fatality in Deshler. An F2 also caused major damage in Buffalo Lake, Minnesota .
Tornado outbreak of April 20, 2004	April 20, 2004	Illinois – Indiana	31	8	Unexpected outbreak produced an F3 that struck the Illinois towns of Granville and Utica, with 8 fatalities at the latter of the two locations. Many other weaker tornadoes touched down as well.
May 2004 tornado outbreak sequence	May 21–31, 2004	Great Plains – Midwest	389	7	Very large outbreak sequence. Produced the second-widest tornado on record, a 2.5 mile-wide F4 that destroyed 95% of Hallam, Nebraska, killing 1. An F3 killed 1 person and destroyed 80% of Marengo, Indiana. An F4 near Weatherby, Missouri, killed 3. See also: List of May 2004 tornado outbreak sequence tornadoes
2004 Roanoke, Illinois tornado	July 13, 2004	Central Illinois	4	0	High-end F4 tornado destroyed an industrial plant and swept away several homes.
Hurricane Frances tornado outbreak	September 2004	Eastern United States	103	0	Produced a large outbreak of mostly weak tornadoes, though in South Carolina, the towns of Gadsden and Millwood sustained considerable damage from F2s. An F3 also touched down near Camden.
Hurricane Ivan tornado outbreak	September 2004	Eastern United States	120	7	Largest hurricane-related tornado outbreak ever recorded. An F2 struck Macedonia, Florida, and killed 4. Many strong tornadoes touched down in Virginia, including an F3 that struck Remington.
Tornado outbreak of November 22–24, 2004	November 22–24, 2004	Southern United States	104	4	Produced multiple strong tornadoes across the South. An F3 struck Olla and Standard, Louisiana, killing 1. An F2 severely damaged the Talladega Superspeedway and struck Bynum, resulting in another fatality.
Tornado outbreak of March 21–22, 2005	March 21–22, 2005	Southern United States	26	1	An F3 near Donalsonville, Georgia, killed one person, and an F2 struck Screven, Georgia, resulting in major damage. Many other weaker tornadoes touched down as well.
Tornado outbreak of April 5–7, 2005	April 5–7, 2005	Southern United States	39	0	Several strong tornadoes touched down across the Southern US, including an F3 that struck Mize, Mississippi. Another F3 caused major damage near Monterey, and an F2 struck Port Fourchon, Louisiana.
2005 Hurricane Cindy tornado outbreak	July 6–8, 2005	Southeastern – Eastern United States	44	0	Produced an F2 that severely damaged the Atlanta Motor Speedway.
Wisconsin tornado outbreak of 2005	August 18, 2005	Wisconsin – Minnesota	28	1	Largest tornado outbreak in Wisconsin history. An F3 caused major damage in Stoughton and killed 1. An F2 also caused severe damage in Viola.
Hurricane Katrina tornado outbreak	August 26–31, 2005	Southeastern – Eastern United States	54	1	Widespread outbreak produced mostly weak tornadoes. Worst damage occurred in Georgia, including an F2 that caused major damage and one fatality near Roopville. The towns of Helen and Fort Valley also sustained major damage from F2s.
Hurricane Rita tornado outbreak	September 22–26, 2005	U.S. South	101	1	Produced numerous tornadoes across the South. An F3 caused major damage near Clayton, Louisiana. An F1 killed one person in a mobile home near Isola, Mississippi.
Evansville tornado outbreak of November 2005	November 6, 2005	Middle Mississippi – Ohio Valley	8	25	Nighttime F3 struck the Evansville, Indiana, area, killing 25 people. Was part of a small outbreak that also produced strong tornadoes that struck Munfordville and Wheatcroft, Kentucky.
Iowa tornado outbreak of November 2005	November 12, 2005	Iowa – Missouri	14	1	Rare November outbreak in the Great Plains. Strong tornadoes struck Ames, Woodward, and Stratford.
Tornado outbreak of November 15, 2005	November 15, 2005	Central – Southeastern United States	49	1	F3 devastated a campground near Benton, Kentucky, and killed one person. A multiple-vortex F4 also hit Madisonville and Earlington, Kentucky, causing major damage. An F2 caused severe damage in Paris, Tennessee.
Tornado outbreak of November 27–28, 2005	November 27–28, 2005	Central – Southeastern United States	55	2	F3 near Plumerville, Arkansas, tossed multiple cars on a highway, killing one person. An F2 near Briar, Missouri, killed another. Another F3 caused major damage near Cherry Hill, Arkansas.
Tornado outbreak sequence of March 9–13, 2006	March 9–13, 2006	Central United States	99	11	Strong outbreak caused deadly tornadoes across the Midwestern United States. Two separate F2s struck Springfield, Illinois, resulting in major damage. An F3 near Renick, Missouri, killed 4 people, and a double F4 occurred near Monroe City.
Tornado outbreak of April 2, 2006	April 2, 2006	Central United States	66	28	Long-tracked F3 devastated the towns of Marmaduke, Arkansas, and Caruthersville, Missouri, killing 2. A deadly F3 killed 16 people in Newbern, Tennessee, while another F3 killed 6 in Bradford.
Tornado outbreak of April 6–8, 2006	April 6–8, 2006	Central – Southeastern United States	73	10	Worst damage and all fatalities occurred in Tennessee. An F3 caused major damage near Charlotte, and another F3 devastated the town of Gallatin, killing 7. Two F1s killed 3 people in the McMinnville area as well. Many other weaker tornadoes also touched down.
Easter Week 2006 tornado outbreak sequence	April 13–19, 2006	Midwestern United States	54	1	Produced an F2 that struck downtown Iowa City, resulting in major damage. An F1 killed one person in a mobile home near Nichols, Iowa. Multiple other tornadoes affected rural areas, a few of which were strong.
Tornado outbreak of May 9–10, 2006	May 9–10, 2006	Midwestern United States, Southern United States	30	3	An F2 caused considerable damage in Childress, Texas. An F3 near Westminster, Texas, killed 3 people. Other strong tornadoes occurred in Louisiana and Mississippi.
Tornado outbreak of August 24, 2006	August 24, 2006	North Dakota, South Dakota, Minnesota	14	1	Small but intense mid-Summer outbreak produced a long-tracked F3 that struck Nicollet and Kasota, Minnesota, killing one person. Two other F3s caused major damage in rural areas near Eureka and Wolsey, South Dakota.
Tornado outbreak of September 21–23, 2006	September 21–23, 2006	Central United States	48	0	Numerous strong tornadoes hit the Midwest, mostly in rural areas. An F4 struck Crosstown, Missouri, and an F3 struck the north edge of Metropolis, Illinois.
Tornado outbreak of November 14–16, 2006	November 14–16, 2006	Southern United States	32	10	Several strong tornadoes occurred across the South. An F3 killed eight people in Riegelwood, North Carolina, and an F2 caused major damage in Montgomery, Alabama. Two F3s also affected rural areas in Mississippi.
2007 Groundhog Day tornado outbreak	February 2, 2007	Florida	4	21	Single supercell produced three of the tornadoes, including two EF3s, and all 21 deaths. Was the second-deadliest tornado event in Florida, behind the outbreak of February 22–23, 1998.
2007 New Orleans tornado outbreak	February 13, 2007	Southern United States	19	1	Produced two EF2s that caused major damage and one fatality in New Orleans, Louisiana. Another EF2 also caused major damage near the town of Breaux Bridge.
Tornado outbreak of February 23–24, 2007	February 23–24, 2007	Southern United States	20	0	Produced several strong tornadoes, especially in Arkansas. The town of Dumas was devastated by an EF3. Another EF3 occurred near Strong.
Tornado outbreak of February 28 – March 2, 2007	February 28 – March 2, 2007	Central – Southeastern United States	57	20	Numerous strong to violent tornadoes across the Midwest and South, including a destructive EF4 in Enterprise, Alabama, that killed nine people, eight of which were students at a local high school that was destroyed. Another EF4 struck Millers Ferry, killing one, and a nighttime EF3 devastated Americus, Georgia, killing two. An EF2 destroyed a mobile home park near Newton, Georgia, killing six.
Tornado outbreak of March 28–31, 2007	March 28–31, 2007	Texas, Oklahoma, Nebraska, Kansas, Colorado	80	5	An EF3 tornado devastated the town of Holly, Colorado, killing two people. Other strong tornadoes hit the rural portions of the Great Plains, especially Texas.
April 2007 nor'easter	April 13–15, 2007	Southern United States	36	2	Produced a moderate outbreak of tornadoes across the South. An EF1 caused considerable damage and killed one in Fort Worth, Texas. An EF3 caused major damage and caused another fatality near Mayesville, South Carolina.
Tornado outbreak sequence of April 20–27, 2007	April 20–27, 2007	United States, Mexico	92	10	An F4 struck Piedras Negras, Coahuila, killing 3 people. The parent supercell produced an EF3 that struck Eagle Pass, Texas, killing 7 people. The towns of Tulia and Cactus, Texas, sustained major damage from EF2s.
Tornado outbreak of May 4–6, 2007	May 4–6, 2007	Central United States	123	14	Very large outbreak across the Great Plains. Produced a large and deadly nighttime EF5 that destroyed 95% of Greensburg, Kansas, killing 11. Other strong tornadoes occurred in Oklahoma and elsewhere in Kansas.
2007 Greensburg tornado	May 4, 2007	Greensburg, Kansas	11 (including ten satellite tornadoes)	11	A large and devastating EF5 tornado destroyed 95% of Greensburg, Kansas, killing 11 and injuring 63 more. The tornado was the first to be rated EF5 on the Enhanced Fujita Scale.
2007 Brooklyn tornado	August 8, 2007	Brooklyn	2	0	EF2 tornado strikes Brooklyn, causing 9 injuries. Also spawned an EF1.
Tornado outbreak of August 26, 2007	August 26, 2007	North Dakota, Minnesota	11	1	Localized outbreak produced a large EF4 that devastated the town of Northwood, North Dakota, killing 1. An EF3 caused damage near Rugh Lake, and an EF2 occurred near Reynolds.
Tornado outbreak of October 17–19, 2007	October 17–19, 2007	Midwest, Ohio Valley, Great Lakes, U.S. South	63	5	EF3s caused major damage in Owensboro, Kentucky, and Nappanee, Indiana. Another EF3 affected rural areas near Vesta, Indiana. EF2s caused fatalities in parts of Missouri and Michigan, including one that struck Williamston, Michigan, and killed two people.
Tornado outbreak sequence of January 7–11, 2008	January 7–8 and 9–11, 2008	Washington, Midwestern, Southern United States	72	4	Rare January outbreak produced strong tornadoes as far north as Wisconsin, where an EF3 tornado caused major damage in the town of Wheatland. Another EF3 tornado caused severe damage in and around Lawrence, Illinois, as well. An EF3 tornado killed three people near Strafford, Missouri, and an EF2 tornado killed one near Appleton, Arkansas. Several EF3 tornadoes impacted Mississippi and Alabama, including one that caused major damage in the town of Caledonia, Mississippi. An unrelated EF1 tornado also caused moderate damage in the northern suburbs of Vancouver, Washington.
2008 Super Tuesday tornado outbreak	February 5–6, 2008	Southern United States	87	57	One of the deadliest modern outbreaks to hit Dixie Alley struck the Midwest and South, producing many strong and violent tornadoes. Included the longest-lived Arkansas tornado on record, an EF4 tornado that traveled 122 mi (196 km) in two hours, killing 13 people and devastating the towns of Clinton, Mountain View, and Highland. One long-track EF3 tornado caused 22 deaths alone in Tennessee, mainly in Castalian Springs and Lafayette. A pair of EF3 and EF4 tornadoes also struck areas in and around Jackson, Tennessee, killing three in the area, and an EF2 tornado moved through Memphis, killing 3.
2008 Atlanta tornado outbreak	March 14–15, 2008	Alabama, Georgia, North Carolina, South Carolina	45	3	Strong tornado hit downtown Atlanta for the second time in history, killing one person. An outbreak of tornadoes, some strong, moved across the South the next day, killing two people.
Tornado outbreak of May 1–3, 2008	May 1–3, 2008	Texas, Oklahoma, Kansas, Missouri, Iowa, Arkansas, Mississippi, Alabama, Tennessee	60	6	Tornadoes struck the Midwest and South, including an EF3 tornado that hit Damascus, Arkansas, killing five people. (13 significant, 2 killer)
Tornado outbreak sequence of May 7–11, 2008	May 7–11, 2008	Southern Plains, Southeastern United States, Mid-Atlantic	120	25	A long-track EF4 tornado killed 21 people in Picher, Oklahoma, and Neosho, Missouri. Other strong to violent tornadoes struck the Eastern and Southern states. (30 significant, 2 violent, 4 killer); See also: List of tornadoes in the tornado outbreak sequence of May 7–11, 2008
Tornado outbreak of May 22–27, 2008	May 22–27, 2008	Great Plains	173	13	This large, long-lived outbreak produced strong to violent tornadoes across the Great Plains and Midwest. An EF3 wedge tornado struck Windsor, Colorado, killing one and causing severe damage. An EF5 tornado caused extreme damage in Parkersburg and New Hartford, Iowa, killing 9. A nighttime EF3 tornado killed two people in a vehicle near Cairo, Kansas. Another EF3 tornado also killed one in Hugo, Minnesota, and destroyed many homes. (25 significant, 2 violent, 4 killer); See also: List of tornadoes in the tornado outbreak of May 22–27, 2008
Tornado outbreak sequence of June 3–11, 2008	June 3–11, 2008	Central United States	192	7	This was the third of a series of widespread tornado outbreaks. Tornadoes hit the Omaha-Council Bluffs area and the Chicago area. An EF3 tornado in Little Sioux, Iowa, struck the Boy Scouts of America's Little Sioux Scout Ranch, killing four people. Additionally, a violent EF4 tornado hit Manhattan, Kansas. (20 significant, 1 violent, 4 killer)
2008 Tropical Storm Fay tornado outbreak	August 18–27, 2008	Southern United States	50	0	Tropical Storm Fay produced dozens of tornadoes, including an EF2 tornado near Wellington, Florida. (3 significant)
November 2008 Carolinas tornado outbreak	November 15, 2008	North Carolina, South Carolina	8	2	A small, but destructive early-morning tornado outbreak killed two people in the Carolinas. (3 significant, 1 killer)
February 2009 North American storm complex	February 10–11, 2009	Central and Southern United States	15	8	The event is best known for producing the strongest February tornado on record in Oklahoma; an EF4 tornado that hit Lone Grove, killing eight people. Other tornadoes caused damage in the Oklahoma City area as well. (2 significant, 1 violent killer)
March 2009 tornado outbreak sequence	March 23–29, 2009	Eastern United States	56	0	Several small tornado outbreaks occurred across six straight days. The event is best known for producing destructive EF3 tornadoes in both Magee, Mississippi, and Corydon, Kentucky. (7 significant)
Tornado outbreak of April 9–11, 2009	April 9–10, 2009	Central and Southern United States	85	5	Produced numerous strong tornadoes across the South, including an EF3 tornado that hit the Mena, Arkansas, area, killing three people, and an EF4 tornado that hit Murfreesboro, Tennessee, killing two. (22 significant, 1 violent, 2 killer)
May 2009 derecho series	May 2–8, 2009	Central and Southern United States	96	2	A series of derecho events and tornado outbreaks occurred over a period of six days, with May 8 being the most of destructive day for tornadoes. An EF3 tornado killed two people in Kentucky, while a second EF3 tornado caused major damage in Missouri. (16 significant, 1 killer)
2009 North American Christmas blizzard	December 23–24, 2009	Texas, Arkansas, Louisiana, Mississippi	28	0	An EF3 tornado caused major damage and two injuries in Lufkin, Texas. EF2 tornadoes also touched down in both Texas and Louisiana. (6 significant)

=== 2010s ===
List of United States tornado outbreaks – 2010–2019
Outbreak	Dates	Year	Region	Tornadoes	Fatalities	Map	Event Summary
Tornado outbreak of March 28–29, 2010	March 28–29	2010	Southeastern United States, The Bahamas	13	3		Tornadoes caused substantial damage to the Piedmont Triad area of North Carolina while a rare tornado in the Bahamas killed three people. A damaging EF3 tornado struck High Point, North Carolina. (4 significant, 1 killer)
Tornado outbreak of April 22–25, 2010	April 22–24	2010	Great Plains, Southern United States	88	10		An extremely large, long-tracked EF4 tornado traveled 149.25 mi (240.19 km) from Tallulah, Louisiana, to north of West Point, Mississippi, becoming the fourth-longest such path in Mississippi history, killing 10 people, four of them in Yazoo City. Other strong to violent tornadoes occurred as well, causing severe damage. (15 significant, 2 violent, 1 killer)
Tornado outbreak of April 30 – May 2, 2010	April 30 – May 2	2010	Midwest, Southern United States	60	5		An EF3 tornado killed one person and extensively damaged Scotland, Arkansas. An overnight EF3 tornado killed two people in a mobile home near Ashland, Mississippi, before crossing into Tennessee, killing one more near Pocahontas. The same storm also produced an EF2 tornado with one death near Abbeville, Mississippi. (16 significant, 3 killer)
Tornado outbreak of May 10–13, 2010	May 10–13	2010	Great Plains	91	3		Numerous strong tornadoes touched down, especially in Oklahoma. A violent EF4 tornado near Moore and Choctaw killed two people, destroying many homes, businesses, and automobiles in the area. A separate EF4 tornado also badly damaged areas near Norman and Little Axe, killing one person in a mobile home. (19 significant, 2 violent killer)
Tornado outbreak of May 22–25, 2010	May 22–25	2010	Central United States	80	0		This fairly large tornado outbreak affected the Great Plains. Most of the tornadoes remained over open country, but some caused considerable damage to rural farms and other structures. This outbreak produced a violent EF4 wedge tornado that caused severe damage near Bowdle, South Dakota. (11 significant, 1 violent)
Tornado outbreak of June 5–6, 2010	June 5–6	2010	Illinois, Indiana, Ohio, Michigan	53	8		An EF4 tornado hit Millbury and Lake Township in Ohio, killing seven people and becoming the second-deadliest US tornado of 2010. Several other destructive tornadoes touched down in Illinois, where one other person died. (15 significant, 1 violent, 2 killer)
Tornado outbreak and derecho of June 16–18, 2010	June 16–18	2010	North Dakota, Minnesota, Iowa	93	3		This was one of the largest Minnesota outbreaks in history and the largest June outbreak in U.S. history. Four large EF4 tornadoes caused extensive damage throughout the states of Minnesota and North Dakota. Several other Northern Plains states were also impacted by strong tornadoes. (17 significant, 4 violent, 3 killer)
2010 Bronx tornado	July 25	2010	New York City	1	0		A weak, but damaging EF1 tornado damaged numerous structures and injured seven people in the Bronx. One indirect fatality also occurred.
2010 Brooklyn–Queens tornadoes	September 16	2010	New York City	14	2		Two tornadoes (rated EF1 and EF0) embedded in a large area of damaging winds moved through the New York City area and caused significant damage, killing one person. The tornadoes were part of a small outbreak that affected the Eastern United States and killed two people. (4 significant, 2 killer)
October 2010 Arizona tornado outbreak and hailstorm	October 6	2010	Arizona, Utah	12	0		One of the strongest and most prolific tornado events west of the Rocky Mountains, a rare tornado outbreak struck the state of Arizona, producing a few strong and destructive tornadoes, including two rated EF3—one of the most intense ever recorded in the state. One other tornado touched down in Utah as well. (6 significant)
October 2010 North American storm complex	October 23–27	2010	Central United States, Eastern United States	69	0		A massive and powerful storm system produced a widespread derecho with 69 embedded tornadoes, including eight EF2 tornadoes. The system also produced a blizzard and a windstorm. (8 significant)
2010 New Year's Eve tornado outbreak	December 30, 2010 – January 1, 2011	2010, 2011	Oklahoma, Arkansas, Missouri, Illinois	37	9		An early morning EF3 tornado struck Cincinnati, Arkansas, killing four people. Another EF3 tornado struck Fort Leonard Wood in southeastern Pulaski County, Missouri, and another killed two elderly women near Rolla. Additionally, an EF1 tornado killed two women near Lecoma and a high-end EF3 tornado caused extensive damage in Sunset Hills, killing another person. (12 significant, 4 killer)
Tornado outbreak and derecho of April 4–5, 2011	April 4–5	2011	Southern United States, Eastern United States	46	1		Many tornadoes, including six EF2 tornadoes, touched down across the southern and eastern United States. One of the EF2 tornadoes killed a person in a mobile home near Eastman, Georgia. (6 significant, 1 killer)
Tornado outbreak of April 9–11, 2011	April 9–11	2011	Iowa, Wisconsin, Texas, Missouri, Alabama	49	0		This outbreak produced many strong tornadoes in Iowa and Wisconsin. In Iowa, the towns of Mapleton, Early and Varina sustained major damage. In Wisconsin, Merrill, Cottonville and Kaukauna sustained severe damage as well. (12 significant, 1 violent)
Tornado outbreak of April 14–16, 2011	April 14–16	2011	Midwest, Southern United States	179	38		A very large three-day outbreak produced numerous large and intense tornadoes. EF3 tornadoes devastated the towns of Tushka, Oklahoma, Leakesville, Mississippi, De Kalb, Mississippi, and Geiger, Alabama, among other places. The final day of the outbreak produced the largest North Carolina tornado outbreak on record. A long-tracked EF3 tornado struck downtown Raleigh and its surrounding suburbs, killing six people, and another EF3 wedge tornado killed 12 in Askewville. (46 significant, 11 killer)
Tornado outbreak of April 19–22, 2011	April 19–22	2011	Midwestern United States, Southern United States	110	0		A large tornado outbreak produced many tornadoes, one of which was a destructive EF4 tornado that struck the St. Louis metropolitan area. A few other strong tornadoes caused damage in Illinois, Indiana, Missouri, and Ohio, most of which were embedded in a squall line. (15 significant, 1 violent)
2011 Super Outbreak	April 25–28	2011	Southern United States, Eastern United States, Ontario	368	324		The largest continuous, fourth-deadliest, and costliest outbreak in United States history caused the most tornado-related deaths since 1936. April 27 was also the deadliest tornado day in the U.S. since March 18, 1925, and the second-deadliest Alabama outbreak on record, with 238 deaths in the state, behind only the 268 people killed on March 21, 1932. The outbreak produced 15 violent (EF4-EF5) tornadoes, all of which occurred on April 27, the third most violent tornadoes produced in a single outbreak behind only the 1965 Palm Sunday tornado outbreak (18) and the 1974 Super Outbreak (30). Numerous, violent, long-tracked tornadoes touched down, with four of them being rated EF5 and eleven being rated EF4. These tornadoes struck eastern Mississippi, north and central Alabama, northwestern Georgia, and eastern Tennessee. There was a total of 71 more tornadoes of significant strength, 55 of which occurred on April 27 alone. There were 31 killer tornadoes during the outbreak, 28 of them on April 27, including 14 of the 15 violent tornadoes. An EF5 tornado traveled 102 mi (164 km) across northwest Alabama, devastating Hackleburg and Phil Campbell, Alabama, along with many other communities, killing 71 people, making it the deadliest Alabama tornado on record. Another long-tracked EF4 tornado produced damage in both Tuscaloosa and the western and northern suburbs of Birmingham, killing 64. This outbreak is called the 2011 Super Outbreak due to the number of tornadoes in one day (224 on April 27), the number of violent tornadoes, and the severity and degree of the outbreak. (87 significant, 15 violent, 31 killer)
Tornado outbreak sequence of May 21–26, 2011	May 21–26	2011	Great Plains, Midwest	239	178		This was one of the largest and deadliest U.S. outbreaks on record. A catastrophic, multiple-vortex, rain-wrapped EF5 tornado on May 22 killed 158 people in Joplin, Missouri—the deadliest single tornado in the U.S. since the 1947 Glazier–Higgins–Woodward tornadoes which killed 181, and the seventh-deadliest U.S. tornado event on record. A major outbreak on May 24 produced two high-end EF4 tornadoes near the Oklahoma City metropolitan area and an extremely violent EF5 tornado that killed nine people near El Reno and Piedmont. Another EF4 tornado struck Denning, Arkansas late on May 24, killing four people, and an EF3 tornado struck Reading, Kansas on May 21, killing one. (44 significant, 5 violent, 9 killer)
2011 Springfield tornado	June 1	2011	New England	6	3		A long-tracked high-end EF3 tornado struck multiple cities and towns, including Westfield, West Springfield, Downtown Springfield, Wilbraham, Monson, Massachusetts, and Brimfield. It caused three deaths, the first tornado-related deaths in Massachusetts in 16 years. Five other weak tornadoes were also documented. (1 significant killer)
Tornado outbreak of June 18–22, 2011	June 18–22	2011	Midwest	78	0		A moderate outbreak produced a series of strong tornadoes in Nebraska and Kansas, most of which remained in rural areas. However, some of the tornadoes caused severe damage to homes and farmsteads. A series of five tornadoes also damaged the Louisville area. (14 significant)
Tornado outbreak of January 22–23, 2012	January 22–23	2012	Southern United States	25	2		This outbreak produced its worst damage during the late overnight and early morning hours. In Alabama, multiple strong tornadoes touched down, including an EF3 tornado that severely impacted the Birmingham metro and killed one person. Maplesville, Alabama, and Fordyce, Arkansas, sustained major damage from EF2 tornadoes as well. (10 significant, 2 killer)
2012 Leap Day tornado outbreak	February 28–29	2012	Great Plains, East South Central States, Ohio Valley	42	15		Several tornadoes formed from February 28–29. The strongest tornado, which was rated EF4, hit Harrisburg, Illinois, killing eight people on February 29. It was just the second F4/EF4 tornado to occur on Leap Day (the other was in Tennessee in 1952). An EF2 tornado also caused extensive damage in Branson, Missouri. Other deadly tornadoes struck Kansas, Missouri, and Tennessee. (19 significant, 1 violent, 7 killer)
Tornado outbreak of March 2–3, 2012	March 2–3	2012	Southern United States, Ohio Valley	70	41		A major outbreak produced many strong tornadoes from the Great Lakes to the Gulf Coast just days after the previous one. A long-track and destructive EF4 tornado devastated multiple towns in southern Indiana, especially Henryville, killing 11 people, and a long-tracked and powerful EF3 tornado destroyed downtown West Liberty, Kentucky, killing 10. An EF4 tornado killed four people near Crittenden, Kentucky, and an EF3 tornado killed three people in Moscow, Ohio, destroying 80% of the town. Other strong tornadoes struck Georgia, Alabama, and Tennessee. (25 significant, 2 violent, 9 killer)
Tornado outbreak sequence of March 18–24, 2012	March 18–24	2012	Great Plains, Southern United States, Ohio Valley	63	1		A slow-moving system produced 63 tornadoes across the Central and Eastern United States, including an EF2 tornado that killed one person in Illinois. Five tornadoes, four of which were strong, also caused damage in the North Platte, Nebraska, area. (10 significant, 1 killer)
Tornado outbreak of April 3, 2012	April 3	2012	Texas, Louisiana	21	0		Tornadoes caused severe damage across the Dallas–Fort Worth metroplex, including an EF3 tornado that destroyed many homes in Forney. Arlington and Lancaster also sustained major damage from EF2 tornadoes. (4 significant)
Tornado outbreak of April 13–16, 2012	April 13–16	2012	Great Plains, Great Lakes region	113	6		EF3 tornadoes caused significant damage in both Wichita, Kansas, and Woodward, Oklahoma, with six people killed in the latter tornado. An EF4 tornado also destroyed structures near Kanopolis Lake, Kansas. (9 significant, 1 violent, 1 killer)
2012 Tropical Storm Debby tornado outbreak	June 23–26	2012	Florida	25	1		This was the second-largest Florida tornado outbreak on record behind only the outbreak caused by Hurricane Agnes on June 18–19, 1972. There were 25 tornadoes. One fatality occurred in Venus, Florida, from an EF2 tornado. Severe damage occurred in or near Winter Haven, Pass-a-Grille in St. Pete Beach and Lake Placid. (2 significant, 1 killer)
2012 Hurricane Isaac tornado outbreak	August 27–September 4	2012	Midwest, Southern United States, Mid-Atlantic states	32	0		Several tornadoes touched down across the Eastern United States, including EF2 tornadoes in Corning, Arkansas, and Pascagoula, Mississippi. (2 significant)
Late December 2012 North American storm complex	December 25–26	2012	Southern United States	31	0		This outbreak produced several significant tornadoes, including an EF3 tornado near Pennington, Texas, and a long-tracked EF3 tornado that struck McNeil, Maxie, and McLain, Mississippi. A large EF2 wedge tornado also struck downtown Mobile, Alabama, which had been struck by a weaker EF1 tornado just five days earlier. (10 significant)
Tornado outbreak of January 29–30, 2013	January 29–30	2013	Midwest, Southern United States	66	1		One of the largest January outbreaks in U.S. history produced tornadoes from Oklahoma to Georgia, including a large EF3 tornado that devastated the town of Adairsville, killing one person, and EF2 tornadoes that hit the towns of Galatia, Coble and Mt. Juliet, causing severe damage. The EF3 tornado was the first tornado to cause fatalities in the United States since June 24, 2012. (11 significant, 1 killer)
Tornado outbreak of February 10, 2013	February 10	2013	Midwest, Southern United States	8	0		A violent EF4 tornado struck West Hattiesburg and Hattiesburg, Mississippi, injuring 71 people. It was part of a small outbreak that produced several tornadoes. (2 significant, 1 violent)
Tornado outbreak of May 15–17, 2013	May 15–17	2013	Texas, Louisiana, Alabama	31	6		This localized outbreak produced two significant tornadoes, one of which was a large EF4 tornado that killed six people and destroyed numerous homes in Granbury, Texas, the first violent tornado to strike Texas since 1999. Additionally, a large EF3 wedge caused significant damage in the town of Cleburne. None of the other tornadoes were stronger than EF1 intensity, although one EF1 tornado caused heavy damage in downtown Ennis. (2 significant, 1 violent killer)
Tornado outbreak of May 18–21, 2013	May 18–21	2013	Midwest, West South Central States, Ontario	78	26		This outbreak produced several significant tornadoes, especially in Oklahoma, where two violent tornadoes struck on successive days. An EF4 tornado killed two people in the Shawnee area on May 19 and a devastating EF5 wedge tornado devastated Moore on May 20, killing 24 people. Other strong tornadoes struck elsewhere in Oklahoma, particularly in Carney where an EF3 tornado touched down on May 19, and in Kansas, Illinois, and Ontario. An EF4 tornado caused major damage west of Rozel, Kansas, on May 18. (9 significant, 3 violent, 2 killer)
Tornado outbreak of May 26–31, 2013	May 26–31	2013	Midwest, West South Central States	134	9		This outbreak produced the widest tornado on record, a massive, multiple-vortex EF3 tornado (which was initially rated EF5) on May 31 near El Reno, Oklahoma, killing eight people, including Tim and Paul Samaras and Carl Young of the TWISTEX team, and producing Doppler-indicated winds greater than 313 mph (504 km/h) over open fields, among the highest winds measured on Earth. Additionally, a large, intense EF3 tornado remained nearly stationary for about an hour on May 28 west of Bennington, Kansas, producing Doppler-measured winds into the EF4-EF5 range above ground level. Other strong tornadoes struck Nebraska, Michigan, New York, Arkansas (one of which—though rated EF1—killed a person), Illinois and Missouri, as well as across Kansas and Oklahoma. (18 significant, 2 killer)
June 12–13, 2013 derecho series	June 12–13	2013	Midwest, Southern United States	30	0		A large severe weather event began with a few strong tornadoes in Iowa and Illinois, including a high-end EF3 tornado that caused major damage in the Belmond area. The storms eventually grew into a large derecho that produced widespread wind damage and numerous embedded weak tornadoes. A second derecho the following day also produced a few embedded tornadoes. (3 significant)
October 2013 North American storm complex	October 3–7	2013	Midwest, Great Plains	22	0		A powerful and dynamic storm system produced a small but intense late-season tornado outbreak, mainly across Nebraska and Iowa. Two of the tornadoes reached EF4 intensity, including one that caused severe damage in Wayne, Nebraska. Other strong tornadoes struck Creighton and Macy. (6 significant, 2 violent)
Tornado outbreak of November 17, 2013	November 17	2013	Midwest	77	8		Many large and strong to violent tornadoes touched down across Illinois, Indiana, Ohio, and Kentucky. Two EF4 tornadoes struck Illinois, one of which devastated the town of Washington and killed three people. The other impacted the New Minden area, killing two others. An EF3 tornado also struck Brookport, killing three people. This outbreak produced the only known violent (EF4+) tornadoes to strike Illinois in the month of November. (33 significant, 2 violent, 3 killer)
December 2013 North American storm complex	December 20–21	2013	Southeast	13	2		A small outbreak of tornadoes occurred in association with a larger system on December 20–21. One EF2 tornado in St. Francis County, Arkansas, caused a fatality while another death occurred from an EF2 tornado in Coahoma County, Mississippi, the two states most affected by the outbreak. Another long-tracked EF2 tornado crossed over the state, injuring two people. (3 significant, 2 killer)
North Carolina tornado outbreak of April 2014	April 25	2014	North Carolina	11	1		A localized but intense outbreak produced an EF3 tornado that caused major damage near the town of Washington and an EF2 tornado that resulted in a fatality in Edenton. (4 significant, 1 killer)
Tornado outbreak and floods of April 27–30, 2014	April 27–30	2014	Midwest, Southern United States	82	35		This deadly outbreak affected mainly Dixie Alley. A high-end EF4 tornado (which may have reached EF5 intensity) devastated the towns of Mayflower and Vilonia, Arkansas, killing 16. Another EF4 tornado killed ten people and caused major damage in Louisville, Mississippi. An EF3 tornado killed two when a trailer park was destroyed in Coxey, Alabama, while another EF3 tornado struck Tupelo, Mississippi, killing one and causing severe damage. Many other strong tornadoes also occurred. (27 significant, 2 violent, 8 killer)
Tornado outbreak of May 10–12, 2014	May 10–12	2014	Central United States, Great Plains	44	0		A widespread tornado occurred in early May. A damaging EF2 tornado struck Orrick, Missouri on the 10th. The day after on the 11th, Mother's Day, dozens of mostly insignificant tornadoes touched down in Kansas and Iowa. One supercell dropped over a dozen tornadoes across southeastern Nebraska, including two large, damaging EF3 wedge tornadoes near Sutton and Cordova, with the latter tornado impacting the village of Beaver Crossing. Near 120 mph rear flank downdraft winds swept across rural areas, with 70 mph gusts reported near the Omaha metropolitan area. Major flooding and a winter storm were spawned by the same system that produced this tornado outbreak. No fatalities or injuries occurred aside from one death attributed to the snowstorm.
Tornado outbreak of June 16–18, 2014	June 16–18	2014	Midwest	76	2		Outbreak spawned a cyclic supercell in Nebraska that produced four consecutive EF4 tornadoes, including two twin tornadoes that devastated the town of Pilger and surrounding areas, killing 2. Three nighttime tornadoes (including an EF3 tornado) struck Madison, Wisconsin, and its suburbs. A large and slow-moving EF3 tornado clipped the town of Coleridge, Nebraska, an EF2 tornado caused major damage in Wessington Springs, South Dakota, and a violent EF4 tornado obliterated a farm outside of Alpena. (20 significant, 5 violent, 2 killer)
Tornado outbreak of April 8–9, 2015	April 8–9	2015	Midwestern United States	27	2		A long-tracked, very high-end EF4 tornado moved across several counties in northern Illinois, causing major damage near Rochelle and devastating the small town of Fairdale, where two people were killed. Was part of a relatively small outbreak of mostly weak tornadoes, though an EF2 tornado caused considerable damage near Mount Selman, Texas. (2 significant, 1 violent killer)
Tornado outbreak sequence of May 5–10, 2015	May 5–10	2015	Great Plains	127	5		EF3 tornadoes caused major damage in Bridge Creek, Oklahoma, and Oklahoma City. A large EF3 tornado also caused significant damage and killed one person near Cisco, Texas, and a high-end EF2 tornado severely damaged the town of Delmont, South Dakota. A nighttime EF3 tornado killed two people and caused major damage in Van, Texas, while another EF2 tornado killed two more at a mobile home park in Nashville, Arkansas. (14 significant, 3 killer)
Tornado outbreak and floods of May 23–26, 2015	May 23–25	2015	Great Plains	75	16		This outbreak produced a destructive early-morning F3 tornado (which may have reached F4 intensity) that devastated the Mexican border city of Ciudad Acuña, killing 14 people. An EF2 tornado killed one person near Cameron, Texas, while an EF3 tornado killed another near Blue, Oklahoma. This was the deadliest North American tornado outbreak of 2015 and was accompanied by catastrophic flooding. (9 significant, 3 killer)
Tornado outbreak of November 16–18, 2015	November 16–18	2015	Great Plains	61	0		An unusual nocturnal late-season tornado outbreak spawned multiple strong tornadoes across the lower Great Plains states. Two EF3 tornadoes caused major damage near Pampa, Texas, one of which destroyed a large chemical plant complex. Another long-tracked EF3 tornado began near Liberal, Kansas, and dissipated near Montezuma, causing significant damage in rural areas. (8 significant)
Tornado outbreak of December 23–25, 2015	December 23–25	2015	Southern United States, Midwestern United States	38	13		This outbreak produced multiple strong to violent long-track tornadoes on December 23 across Mississippi and Tennessee, including an EF4 tornado that tracked through parts of both states, causing major damage in Holly Springs, Mississippi, and killing 9 people along its path. A high-end EF3 tornado caused major damage near Clarksdale as well, killing two. Another EF3 tornado destroyed many structures in the small community of Lutts, Tennessee, and an EF2 tornado killed two people near Linden. A high-end EF2 tornado also caused considerable damage in the southwestern part of Birmingham, Alabama, on December 25. (8 significant, 1 violent, 3 killer)
December 2015 North American storm complex	December 26–28	2015	Southern United States	32	13		An outbreak of 32 tornadoes severely impacted areas from the Dallas–Fort Worth metroplex eastward through the Southeastern United States. An EF3 tornado destroyed many homes in Ovilla and Glenn Heights. The same storm produced an EF4 tornado that devastated parts of Garland and Rowlett, killing 10 people. An EF2 tornado killed two people in Copeville, while an EF1 tornado caused a fatality near Blue Ridge as well. (5 significant, 1 violent, 3 killer)
Tornado outbreak of February 23–24, 2016	February 23–24	2016	Southern United States, Eastern United States	61	7		The second largest February tornado outbreak on record produced many significant tornadoes across the Gulf Coast and East Coast states. An EF2 tornado caused major damage in Laplace, Louisiana. An EF3 tornado caused major damage in Paincourtville and Convent, Louisiana, killing two people, while an EF2 tornado killed one person near Purvis, Mississippi. An EF3 tornado caused severe damage in Pensacola, Florida, and an EF1 tornado killed 3 people in Waverly, Virginia. An EF3 tornado also destroyed multiple homes near Tappahannock, Virginia, while another EF3 killed one person in Evergreen. (9 significant, 4 killer)
Tornado outbreak of May 7–10, 2016	May 7–10	2016	Western United States, Great Plains, Ohio Valley	57	2		A four-day outbreak of dozens of tornadoes. A high-end EF2 tornado occurred near Wray, Colorado, a violent EF4 tornado killed one person near Katie, Oklahoma, a damaging EF3 wedge tornado destroyed numerous homes near Sulphur, another EF3 tornado caused another fatality near Bromide, and Mayfield, Kentucky sustained major damage from an EF3 tornado as well. (11 significant, 1 violent, 2 killer)
Tornado outbreak sequence of May 22–26, 2016	May 22–26	2016	Western United States, Great Plains	98	0		This outbreak sequence produced numerous strong tornadoes across the Great Plains. Numerous significant (EF2-EF3) tornadoes spawned by a cyclic supercell thunderstorm caused heavy damage near Dodge City, Kansas. EF3 tornadoes also caused damage near Big Spring, Turkey and Garden City, Texas. An EF4 wedge tornado (which may have reached EF5 intensity) caused major damage near Abeline and Chapman, Kansas. (18 significant, 1 violent)
Tornado outbreak of August 24, 2016	August 24	2016	Indiana, Ohio, Ontario	24	0		An unexpected and unusual late-season tornado outbreak produced an EF3 tornado that severely damaged or destroyed many homes and businesses in Kokomo, Indiana. Another EF3 tornado caused major damage to farms near Woodburn, Indiana. EF2 tornadoes inflicted heavy damage near Cecil and Defiance, Ohio, while another EF2 tornadoes severely damaged structures in Windsor, Ontario. (6 significant)
Tornado outbreak of November 27–30, 2016	November 27–30	2016	Central United States, Southern United States	48	6		A four-day outbreak produced several strong nighttime tornadoes in Dixie Alley. An EF3 tornado killed 4 people and caused major damage in Rosalie and near Ider, Alabama. Another EF3 tornado killed two people and severely damaged the town of Ocoee, Tennessee, while a high-end EF2 tornado caused major damage to homes in businesses in Athens. An EF2 tornado caused considerable damage at the eastern fringes of Huntsville, Alabama, and an EF3 tornado destroyed several structures near Neel. (9 significant, 2 killer)
Tornado outbreak of January 21–23, 2017	January 21–23	2017	Southeastern United States	81	20		This was the second-deadliest and second-largest January tornado outbreak since reliable records began in 1950, as well as the largest tornado outbreak on record in the state of Georgia. An early morning EF3 tornado produced major damage in Hattiesburg, Mississippi, killing 4. An EF3 tornado near Adel, Georgia obliterated a mobile home park and killed 11 people along its path, while a large EF3 wedge tornado struck Albany and killed 5. Many other strong tornadoes caused damage across the Southern United States as well. (14 significant, 3 killer)
Tornado outbreak of February 7, 2017	February 7	2017	Southeastern United States	15	1		An EF3 tornado caused major damage in eastern New Orleans, making it the strongest tornado ever recorded in the city's history. It was part of a localized outbreak of tornadoes that impacted the Southern United States, mainly Louisiana. An EF2 tornado caused damage near Killian, Louisiana, while another EF3 tornado occurred near Watson. An EF1 tornado struck the town of Donaldsonville, killing one person there. (4 significant, 1 killer)
Tornado outbreak of February 28 – March 1, 2017	February 28 – March 1	2017	Midwestern United States	71	4		A major tornado outbreak occurred across portions of the Midwestern United States and Ohio Valley, leading to 71 tornadoes in total. EF3 tornadoes destroyed homes in and around Washburn and Ottawa, Illinois, with two people killed in Ottawa. The most significant tornado was a long-track EF4 tornado that caused major damage in the Perryville, Missouri, area and killed one person. The same storm also produced a long-track EF3 tornado that killed one person near Crossville as well. (12 significant, 1 violent, 3 killer)
Tornado outbreak of March 6–7, 2017	March 6–7	2017	Midwestern United States	63	0		Following a significant outbreak just a week prior, a second tornado outbreak affected many of the same areas. Many homes were damaged or destroyed in the town of Oak Grove, Missouri, as a result of an EF3 tornado. An EF1 tornado that struck near Bricelyn, Minnesota was the earliest in state history. EF2 tornadoes caused heavy damage in the Iowa towns of Seymour, Centerville, and Muscatine. A long-track EF2 tornado also struck Parthenon, Arkansas. (10 significant)
Tornado outbreak and floods of April 28 – May 1, 2017	April 28 – May 1	2017	Southeastern United States, Central United States	75	5		This outbreak affected the Southeastern United States and portions of Central United States. Eight tornadoes would strike East Texas on April 29, including two destructive wedge tornadoes, which were rated EF3 and EF4, affecting areas outside of Canton, Texas, killing two people each. An EF2 tornado struck Durant, Mississippi and killed one person as well. The outbreak was accompanied by deadly flooding. (10 significant, 1 violent, 3 killer)
Tornado outbreak sequence of May 15–20, 2017	May 15–20	2017	Central United States, Great Lakes, Ohio Valley	134	2		Large tornado outbreak sequence produced the longest-tracked tornado in Wisconsin history; an EF3 tornado that caused major damage near Chetek and Conrath. An EF3 tornado caused severe damage in Pawnee Rock and near Great Bend, Kansas. A high-end EF2 tornado destroyed homes and businesses in the southern part of Elk City, Oklahoma, killing one person. Another EF2 tornado struck Muskogee, Oklahoma, and many other weak tornadoes also occurred. (9 significant, 2 killer)
2017 Tulsa tornadoes	August 6	2017	Tulsa, Oklahoma	4	0		A high-end EF2 tornado caused significant damage in Tulsa, injuring 30 people. This event also produced three EF1 tornadoes. The event was notable for being unexpected, with all but one of the tornadoes being timely warned on (1 significant)
Tornado outbreak of March 19, 2018	March 19	2018	Southeastern United States	22	0		This tornado outbreak caused seven injuries. A particularly destructive long-tracked EF3 tornado hit Jacksonville State University in Jacksonville, Alabama, injuring four people, while an EF2 tornado in Southside caused an injury. The system that produced the outbreak later became a nor'easter. (5 significant)
April 2018 North American storm complex	April 13–15	2018	Southern United States, Eastern United States	73	1		This tornado outbreak produced multiple strong tornadoes throughout the Southern and Eastern United States. A large EF2 tornado caused significant damage in Mountainburg, Arkansas, and another EF2 tornado severely impacted Meridian, Mississippi. An EF1 tornado killed one person in Red Chute, Louisiana, and a high-end EF2 tornado caused major damage in Greensboro, North Carolina. An EF3 tornado destroyed many homes in Elon, Virginia, as well. (11 significant, 1 killer)
2018 Iowa tornado outbreak	July 19–20	2018	Midwestern United States, Kentucky	32	0		An unexpected tornado outbreak erupted across parts of Iowa on July 19. Twin EF2 tornadoes caused damage in Bondurant, while an EF3 tornado occurred struck eastern Pella, damaging a large Vermeer plant complex. Another EF3 tornado moved directly through downtown Marshalltown. The EF3 tornadoes causing $320 million in damage and 36 injuries. Another person in Corydon, Indiana, was indirectly injured the following day by an EF1 tornado. The event also featured the deadly Table Rock Lake duck boat accident near Branson, Missouri. (4 significant)
2018 United States–Canada tornado outbreak	September 20–21	2018	Great Lakes, Ontario, Quebec	38	0		This outbreak produced several strong tornadoes in the Great Lakes region of the United States, and in eastern Canada as well. On September 20, a high-end EF2 tornado destroyed multiple homes in Morristown, Minnesota, and another EF2 tornado impacted Faribault. The next day, a high-end EF3 tornado destroyed numerous homes in Dunrobin, Ontario, and Gatineau, Quebec, injuring numerous people. A high-end EF2 tornado also caused severe damage in Nepean, Ontario. (8 significant)
Tornado outbreak of November 30 – December 2, 2018	November 30 – December 2	2018	Southern United States, Midwestern United States	49	1		A late-season outbreak produced an EF3 tornado that caused major damage an injured 22 people in Taylorville, Illinois. An EF1 tornado killed one person in Aurora, Missouri, and a long-tracked EF2 tornado caused major damage at Tenkiller Ferry Lake in Oklahoma. Another EF2 tornado caused significant damage in Van Buren, Arkansas, while an EF3 tornado injured four people at Naval Submarine Base Kings Bay in Georgia. This was the largest December tornado outbreak in Illinois state history. (7 significant, 1 killer)
2018 Port Orchard tornado	December 18	2018	Port Orchard, Washington	1	0		A rare EF2 tornado strikes Port Orchard, Washington, becoming the first tornado in Western Washington since 2017, and the first F2 or stronger tornado in the state since 1986. The tornado was unusually strong for a December tornado in Washington. (1 significant)
2019 Columbus, Mississippi, tornado	February 23–24	2019	Southeastern United States	8	1		A low-end EF3 tornado struck Columbus, Mississippi, causing major damage, killing one person, and injuring 11 others; an indirect fatality also occurred from this tornado. It was part of a small outbreak that impacted Mississippi, Alabama, and Georgia. (2 significant, 1 killer)
Tornado outbreak of March 3, 2019	March 3	2019	Southeastern United States	41	23		Over the course of 6 hours, this tornado outbreak produced a total of 41 tornadoes, which touched down across portions of Alabama, Georgia, Florida, and South Carolina. The strongest of these was an EF4 tornado that devastated rural communities from Beauregard, Alabama, to Talbotton, Georgia, killing 23 people and injuring 97 others. Its death toll represented more than twice the number of tornado deaths in the United States in 2018, and it was the deadliest single tornado in the country since the 2013 EF5 Moore tornado. Several other significant tornadoes occurred, including EF2 tornadoes caused severe damage near Eufaula, Alabama, and in Cairo, Georgia. An EF3 tornado destroyed homes near Tallahassee, Florida, as well. (9 significant, 1 violent killer)
Tornado outbreak of March 12–14, 2019	March 12–14	2019	Southeastern United States, New Mexico	38	0		As part of a larger blizzard, a tornado outbreak shaped up across the Southern United States. The most significant tornadoes were two EF2 tornadoes in New Mexico. The system then proceeded east for the next 2 days. Kentucky, Michigan, and Alabama also had significant EF2 tornadoes. Overall, the 38 tornadoes caused 8 injuries. (5 significant)
Tornado outbreak of April 13–15, 2019	April 13–15	2019	Southern United States, Northeastern United States	75	3		An expansive tornado outbreak occurred from Texas to the Northeast, lasting 40 hours. The town of Alto, Texas, was struck by two separate strong tornadoes, including an EF3 tornado that killed two people. Another EF3 tornado destroyed many homes in Franklin, Texas. A high-end EF2 tornado struck Hamilton, Mississippi, late on April 13, destroying multiple structures and causing another fatality. A high-end EF2 tornado struck Starbrick, Pennsylvania, as well. (18 significant, 2 killer)
Tornado outbreak of April 17–19, 2019	April 17–19	2019	Southern United States, Northeastern United States, Carolinas	97	0		A multi-day tornado outbreak produced tornadoes from Texas to Virginia. A high-end EF2 tornado caused severe damage in Morton, Mississippi. An EF3 tornado caused major structural damage to homes near Rocky Mount, Virginia, and injured two people. Several strong tornadoes also occurred in Pennsylvania and the Carolinas as well. The squall line that spawned several of the event's associated tornadoes caused four non-tornadic fatalities. (12 significant)
Tornado outbreak of May 17–18, 2019	May 17–18	2019	Great Plains	47	0		First major outbreak during two weeks of heightened tornadic activity across the United States. On May 17, multiple strong tornadoes touched down across parts of Nebraska and Kansas, though they remained in mostly rural areas. Numerous EF2 and EF3 tornadoes impacted Texas on May 18, including two EF2 tornadoes that caused significant damage in the cities of Abilene and San Angelo, and an EF3 tornado which caused major damage in Ballinger as well. Four people were injured. (13 significant)
Tornado outbreak of May 20–23, 2019	May 20–23	2019	Great Plains	114	4		Second major outbreak during two weeks of heightened tornadic activity across the United States. An early morning EF2 tornado hit near Adair, Iowa, killing one and injuring another. On May 20, the SPC issued a high risk for portions of Oklahoma in what was anticipated to be a major outbreak with violent, long-tracked tornadoes; however, conditions were less favorable than expected, and only moderate activity occurred. A large EF3 tornado passed near Golden City, Missouri, killing three and injuring one. A damaging nighttime EF3 struck Jefferson City, Missouri, just before midnight, and resulted in one death and 32 injuries. (12 significant, 2 killer)
Tornado outbreak of May 25–30, 2019	May 25–30	2019	Great Plains, Ohio Valley, Northeastern United States	182	4		Third and final major outbreak during two weeks of heightened tornadic activity across the United States, as well as the largest. A damaging nighttime EF3 struck Jefferson City, Missouri, just before midnight, and resulted in one death and 32 injuries. On May 25, a small but intense QLCS EF3 tornado hit a mobile home park and a motel in southern El Reno, Oklahoma, causing two fatalities and 19 injuries. Another EF3 tornado destroyed many homes in Celina, Ohio, killing one person and injuring eight others. Dayton, Ohio, and its suburbs were hit by EF4, EF3, and EF2 tornadoes in quick succession, causing widespread destruction with the EF4 tornado injuring 166 people. An EF4 wedge tornado also struck the outskirts of Lawrence and Linwood, Kansas, destroying many homes and injuring 18 people. (24 significant, 2 violent, 2 killer)
Tornado outbreak of October 20–22, 2019	October 20–22	2019	Great Plains, Ohio Valley, Northeastern United States	36	0		A fall tornado outbreak caused major damage in the Dallas–Fort Worth metroplex, including a destructive low-end EF3 tornado that destroyed many homes and businesses in Dallas, causing $1.55 billion in damages. A high-end EF2 tornado also caused significant damage in Garland, Texas. A large EF2 wedge tornado also struck Siloam Springs, Arkansas. (3 significant)
Tornado outbreak of December 16–17, 2019	December 16–17	2019	Deep South	41	3		A two-day tornado outbreak extending from Louisiana to Georgia produced numerous strong tornadoes. Most of the activity was on December 16, including eight EF2 tornadoes and five EF3 tornadoes. A long-tracked EF3 tornado killed one person near Rosepine, Louisiana, and prompted a tornado emergency for Alexandria, where major damage occurred. An EF2 tornado killed two people near Town Creek, Alabama. Additional EF3 tornadoes caused severe damage in Sumrall and Laurel, Mississippi. December 17 was less intense, producing mostly weak tornadoes, although one EF2 tornado caused significant damage in and near Mystic, Georgia. (14 significant, 2 killer)

=== 2020s ===
List of United States tornado outbreaks – 2020–2026
Outbreak	Dates	Year	Region	Tornadoes	Fatalities	Map	Event Summary
Tornado outbreak of January 10–11, 2020	January 10–11	2020	South Central United States, Southeastern United States	80	7		An EF1 tornado killed one person near Nacogdoches, Texas. A high-end EF2 tornado obliterated two trailer homes near Haughton, Louisiana, killing three people. Another high-end EF2 tornado caused significant damage near Carrollton, Alabama, killing three people. There were 11 more EF2 tornadoes confirmed from Missouri to South Carolina as well. (13 significant, 3 killer)
Tornado outbreak of February 5–7, 2020	February 5–7	2020	South Central United States, Southeastern United States	37	1		A long-tracked EF2 tornado struck Enterprise, Mississippi, and three other EF2 tornadoes touched down in other parts of the state. An EF1 tornado destroyed mobile homes and killed one person near Demopolis, Alabama. A high-end EF1 tornado caused considerable damage in Spartanburg, South Carolina, and an EF2 tornado caused significant damage near Kannapolis, North Carolina. (7 significant, 1 killer)
Tornado outbreak of March 2–3, 2020	March 2–3	2020	Southeastern United States	15	25		This small but devastating outbreak resulted in 25 fatalities from three separate tornadoes in Tennessee, which were all produced by the same supercell that produced all 10 tornadoes in the state from the outbreak. An EF2 tornado killed one person near Camden. A long-tracked EF3 tornado struck Nashville, causing five deaths and becoming the 6th costliest tornado in U.S. history. A violent EF4 tornado also caused catastrophic damage in and around Cookeville, causing an additional 19 deaths. (6 significant, 1 violent, 3 killer)
2020 Easter tornado outbreak	April 12–13	2020	Southeastern United States	141	32		This major and deadly outbreak produced many strong to violent tornadoes across the Deep South into the Mid-Atlantic states. An EF3 tornado damaged or destroyed hundreds of homes in Monroe, Louisiana, on April 12. Two intense supercell thunderstorms developed across southern Mississippi, producing three intense tornadoes, including two EF4 tornadoes near Bassfield, Mississippi, killing 12. The second tornado produced high-end EF4 damage and devastated the small towns of Soso and Moss, reaching a maximum width of 2.25 miles (3.62 km) wide, the widest tornado in the state's history and the third widest in the world. Later that night, an EF2 tornado killed eight in Sumac, Georgia, and an EF3 tornado killed two in the eastern suburbs of Chattanooga. Through the night on April 12 into the morning of April 13, multiple EF3 tornadoes touched down in South Carolina, including one that severely damaged the town of Seneca, killing one person. An EF4 tornado killed five in Hampton County, South Carolina, as well, becoming the first violent tornado ever recorded in the South Carolina Lowcountry. (35 significant, 3 violent, 9 killer)
Tornado outbreak of April 19–20, 2020	April 19–20	2020	Southeastern United States	22	2		Another significant tornado outbreak struck the Deep South a week after the previous one. Multiple strong tornadoes were confirmed, including a violent EF4 tornado that caused catastrophic damage and a fatality near Sandy Hook, Mississippi. This was the third EF4 tornado to strike southern Mississippi in a week. An EF2 tornado also caused a fatality in Tumbleton, Alabama. (4 significant, 1 violent, 2 killer)
Tornado outbreak of April 21–23, 2020	April 22–23	2020	Oklahoma, Texas, Arkansas, Louisiana, Mississippi, Alabama, Florida, and Georgia	53	6		Several strong tornadoes touched down across the Great Plains and Deep South. A high-end EF2 tornado struck Madill, Oklahoma, killing two. An EF3 tornado impacted Onalaska, Texas, killing three. An EF2 tornado killed one person and damaged the Louisiana State University of Alexandria campus as well. (11 significant, 3 killer)
Hurricane Isaias tornado outbreak	August 3–4	2020	East Coast of the United States	39	2		This outbreak of tornadoes occurred as a result of the passage of Hurricane Isaias. An EF3 tornado destroyed a mobile home park near Windsor, North Carolina, killing two and injuring 14. It was the first tropical cyclone-spawned tornado rated F3/EF3 since 2005. An EF1 tornado caused considerable damage in downtown Suffolk, Virginia, and an EF2 tornado caused major damage to businesses near Courtland. A high-end EF2 tornado injured five people and caused severe damage to homes near Palmer as well. A low-end EF2 tornado touched down in Dover and tracked 35.5 miles (57.1 km) through Delaware, becoming the longest tracked tornado in the history of the state. Another EF2 tornado also damaged a daycare center and injured six in the northeastern suburbs of Philadelphia. (8 significant, 1 killer)
2020 Midwest derecho	August 10	2020	Midwestern United States	26	0		Numerous weak tornadoes touched down in Iowa, Wisconsin, Illinois, and Indiana, including multiple tornadoes that affected the Chicago metropolitan area. It was part of a much larger and damaging derecho event that was the costliest single thunderstorm disaster on record.
Tornado outbreak of February 15, 2021	February 15	2021	Southeast United States	6	3		This was a localized tornado outbreak as part of a larger winter storm. An EF2 tornado in Damascus, Georgia caused five injuries, while a high-end EF3 tornado near Sunset Beach, North Carolina, caused three deaths and ten injuries. (2 significant, 1 killer)
March 2021 North American blizzard	March 13	2021	Southern Plains	21	0		This was a localized tornado outbreak as part of a larger winter storm. Several large tornadoes touched down, although most stayed over open terrain and did little to no damage. Most of the tornadoes were likely stronger than the rating they were assigned. (3 significant)
Tornado outbreak of March 16–18, 2021	March 16–18	2021	Southeast United States	51	0		This outbreak occurred mostly within Alabama and Mississippi on March 17 inside a high risk convective outlook for tornadoes. A majority of the tornadoes that touched down were weak, and while a few strong tornadoes did occur, none exceeded EF2 intensity. Areas in and near Waynesboro, Mississippi as well as Burnsville, Silas, and Billingsley, Alabama, received considerable damage from these EF2 tornadoes. (4 significant)
Tornado outbreak sequence of March 24–28, 2021	March 24–28	2021	Southeast United States	43	7		Two consecutive tornado outbreaks occurred, with the first one affecting mainly Alabama on March 25. Parts of the state had been placed under a high risk convective outlook for tornadoes on that day, the second high risk issued for this area in just over a week. Tennessee, Georgia, Texas, and Arkansas also saw impactful tornadoes. A low-end EF3 tornado killed six in Ohatchee, Alabama on March 25, and a violent EF4 tornado Newnan, Georgia, just after midnight on March 26 resulted in an indirect fatality due to a medical issue. Another tornado outbreak affected the Lower Mississippi and Tennessee Valleys on March 27, producing several strong EF2 tornadoes, including one that killed a person near Carthage, Texas, on March 27. Along with the tornadic fatalities, eight non-tornadic fatalities also occurred during the outbreak sequence. (15 significant, 1 violent, 2 killer)
Tornado outbreak of May 2–4, 2021	May 2–4	2021	Southeastern United States, Central Plains, Mississippi Valley, and Mid-Atlantic	97	0		A large tornado outbreak produced many tornadoes across various regions of the United States, most of which were weak. A few strong tornadoes did touch down, but none exceeded EF2 in intensity. An EF1 tornado caused considerable damage in Tupelo, Mississippi, and a high-end EF1 tornado struck Yazoo City. A high-end EF2 tornado destroyed a house near Blum, Texas, while another EF2 tornado caused major damage to homes and tossed vehicles near Waxahachie, injuring eight people. An EF2 tornado also damaged or destroyed homes near Callao, Virginia. (6 significant)
Tornado outbreak of July 28–29, 2021	July 28–29	2021	Midwestern United States, Ohio Valley, Mid-Atlantic, Northeastern United States	46	0		This outbreak began in Wisconsin, with numerous weak tornadoes that formed within a line of severe thunderstorms that moved across the state. Farther east, an EF2 tornado struck New Athens, Ohio, and caused considerable damage, while other EF2 tornadoes caused major tree damage near New Hope, Pennsylvania and Carrollton, Ohio. A low-end EF3 tornado caused major damage to structures and vehicles in the Philadelphia, Pennsylvania, suburbs of Trevose and Bensalem, injuring five people. An EF2 tornado also struck High Bar Harbor, New Jersey, injuring eight people. (5 significant)
Hurricane Ida tornado outbreak	August 29 – September 2	2021	Southern United States, Mid-Atlantic, Northeastern United States	36	1		This outbreak started in the Southern United States where Hurricane Ida made landfall. Only weak tornadoes touched down during the first three days of the outbreak, although one high-end EF1 tornado injured three people and damaged structures in Saraland, Alabama. The worst day of the outbreak was September 1, when several strong tornadoes impacted the Mid-Atlantic and Northeastern United States, regions that had already been affected by the previous outbreaks in the weeks leading up to this event. In Annapolis, Maryland, an EF2 tornado caused significant damage to many homes and businesses. A high-end EF2 tornado moved through the Philadelphia, Pennsylvania, suburbs of Fort Washington and Upper Dublin, killing one person and injuring two others. Another EF2 tornado struck Oxford, Pennsylvania, and an EF3 tornado caused major damage and destroyed multiple homes in Mullica Hill, New Jersey. Historic flooding also occurred throughout the region as well. (4 significant, 1 killer)
Tornado outbreak of December 10–11, 2021	December 10–11	2021	Southern United States, Midwestern United States, Ohio Valley	71	89		This major, destructive, and deadly nighttime tornado outbreak caused catastrophic damage and numerous fatalities across the Ohio Valley and Southern United States. Several powerful tornadoes caused heavy to catastrophic damage to many towns and cities across Missouri, Tennessee, Arkansas, and especially Kentucky. One supercell tracked over 250 miles (400 km) throughout the four states, spawning a family of 11 tornadoes, including two violent EF4 tornadoes. The first one killed eight people across three states, while the second one killed 57 people in Kentucky along a track of over 160 miles (260 km). The city of Mayfield was devastated by the tornado, along with several other small towns. A second supercell produced a very long-track EF3 tornado across Tennessee and Kentucky, along with three EF3 tornadoes and four EF2 tornadoes in Kentucky, including a deadly EF3 tornado in Bowling Green, Kentucky. (24 significant, 2 violent, 6 killer)
December 2021 Midwest derecho and tornado outbreak	December 15	2021	Midwestern United States	120	0		A powerful, fast-moving derecho led to hundreds of damaging wind reports across the Midwest, along with 120 embedded tornadoes confirmed in Nebraska, Iowa, Minnesota, and Wisconsin. Several of these tornadoes were strong and long-tracked, including 33 that were rated EF2, one of which injured two people in Columbus, Nebraska. This eclipsed the event five days prior for the largest December outbreak on record and subsequently became one of the largest single-day tornado outbreaks in recorded history. (33 significant)
Tornado outbreak of March 5–7, 2022	March 5–7	2022	Midwestern United States, Mississippi Valley	32	7		Several intense tornadoes struck areas mainly across southeastern Iowa on March 5. A long-tracked, violent low-end EF4 tornado struck near Winterset, killing six people and injuring five others. Meanwhile, an EF3 tornado struck near Chariton, killing one and injuring another. Other tornadoes touched down the next day across mostly Arkansas and Missouri, including a low-end EF2 tornado that injured six people in Sage, Arkansas. (7 significant, 1 violent, 2 killer)
Tornado outbreak of March 21–23, 2022	March 21–23	2022	Southern United States, Eastern United States	86	2		Numerous tornadoes occurred across Texas, Oklahoma, Louisiana, Mississippi, and Alabama from March 21–22, with the most severe damage occurring in Jacksboro, Texas, De Kalb, Mississippi, and Arabi, Louisiana, coming from three separate EF3 tornadoes. One person was killed by an EF2 tornado in Sherwood Shores, Texas, while a second fatality occurred in Crockett, Texas, from another EF2 tornado as well. A fatality also occurred in Arabi just outside of New Orleans from one of the EF3 tornadoes as well. EF2 tornadoes were also confirmed near Pickens, South Carolina, and Gladesboro, Virginia, respectively on March 23. (16 significant, 2 killer)
Tornado outbreak of March 29–31, 2022	March 29–31	2022	Southern United States, Midwestern United States, Eastern United States	90	2		Another tornado outbreak struck the same areas affected by the previous outbreak a week prior. The first significant tornado of the outbreak occurred early on March 30, when an EF3 tornado struck Springdale, Arkansas, causing seven injuries. Later that afternoon, an EF1 tornado caused an injury in Pope, Mississippi. Another EF1 tornado moved through downtown Jackson, Mississippi, injuring one person. Other tornadoes occurred in Kansas, Missouri, Texas, and Louisiana, while numerous tornadoes struck Mississippi and Alabama. A long-tracked EF3 tornado moved through a portion of the Talladega National Forest and struck Montevallo, Alabama, injuring two people. Another EF3 tornado near Alford, Florida early on March 31 resulted in two deaths and three injuries. Scattered tornado activity occurred later that day across areas of the Eastern United States, which included EF2 tornadoes in Wayne Township, Pennsylvania, and near Norwood, North Carolina. (12 significant, 1 killer)
Tornado outbreak sequence of April 4–7, 2022	April 4–7	2022	Southern United States	89	1		For the third straight week, a tornado outbreak affected the same areas affected by the previous two outbreaks. Several tornadoes touched down mostly in the Dallas–Fort Worth metroplex on April 4, before a much more significant outbreak occurred in Mississippi, Alabama, Georgia, and South Carolina the next day. Several tornadoes touched down from a mesoscale convective system that swept eastward on March 5, while numerous large, long-tracked, intense tornadoes were spawned by supercells that formed ahead of the squall line. One person was killed by a large, violent EF4 tornado in Black Creek, Georgia, while three separate EF3 tornadoes impacted Allendale, South Carolina; Ulmer, South Carolina; and Bonaire, Georgia. A second wave of weak tornadoes also struck Georgia and Florida on April 6–7. (14 significant, 1 violent killer)
April 2022 North American storm complex	April 11–13	2022	Southern United States, Midwestern United States	74	0		Isolated severe weather over Arkansas on April 11 gave way to a more significant severe weather event in Texas and the Upper Midwest on April 12, followed by a large severe weather outbreak on April 13. Four weak tornadoes were confirmed in Arkansas on April 11. More significant tornadoes occurred on April 12, including a high-end EF3 tornado in Bell County, Texas that resulted in 23 injuries, and several other strong tornadoes over northern Iowa and southeastern Minnesota. More tornadoes occurred across primarily Mississippi, Alabama, and Kentucky on April 13, accompanied by a widespread damaging wind event. (6 significant)
May 2022 Midwest derecho	May 12	2022	Midwestern United States	32	0		A derecho produced an outbreak of tornadoes across the Dakotas and Minnesota. An EF1 tornado quickly spun up near Thomas, South Dakota, forcing the residents of homes who were outside to seek shelter under a tractor, resulting in an injury. A strong EF2 rope tornado struck Castlewood, causing heavy damage and also injuring one person. A high-end EF2 tornado near Gary struck a farm, heavily damaging the house and damaging several other farm buildings and vehicles, injuring another person. Although none of the tornadoes were fatal, the event as a whole caused five deaths and at least 13 injuries. (5 significant)
Tornado outbreak of November 4–5, 2022	November 4–5	2022	Southern United States, Midwestern United States	31	2		An intense late-season tornado outbreak affected northeastern Texas, southeastern Oklahoma, northwestern Louisiana, and western Arkansas on November 4. Numerous large, intense, long-tracked tornadoes touched down, and two tornado emergencies were issued for Idabel, Oklahoma and New Boston, Texas, respectively. One death each was recorded in Pickens, Oklahoma and Cason, Texas, respectively, as well as numerous injuries. (11 significant, 2 violent, 2 killer)
Tornado outbreak of December 12–15, 2022	December 12–15	2022	Southern United States	77	3		A widespread tornado outbreak produced numerous strong tornadoes across portions of the southern United States. An EF3 tornado caused significant damage near Farmerville, Louisiana, while an EF2 tornado struck near Keatchie, Louisiana, killing two people. Another EF2 tornado struck near Killona, Louisiana, killing one and a damaging EF2 tornado impacted the New Orleans metro, following a path similar to a high-end EF3 tornado from March 22, 2022. Numerous other weak tornadoes also touched down. (21 significant, 2 killer)
Tornado outbreak of January 12, 2023	January 12	2023	Southeastern United States	42	8		A significant tornado outbreak took place primarily across Alabama and Georgia during the morning and afternoon of January 12. One supercell produced 10 tornadoes that produced moderate to severe damage from south-central Alabama to west-central Georgia, especially in Selma, Alabama (EF2 tornado), and Autauga County, Alabama, and as well as LaGrange, Griffin, Experiment, and the Jackson Lake area in Georgia. An EF3 tornado in Autauga County, Alabama, resulted in seven fatalities before moving through several counties to the northeast, while an EF2 tornado in the Jackson Lake area in Georgia killed one person (the tornado was also responsible for an indirect death the next day). Elsewhere, other tornadoes caused damage in Sumter and Mobile counties in Alabama, as well as parts of Tennessee, Kentucky, Illinois, and the Carolinas. (13 significant, 2 killer)
2023 Pasadena–Deer Park tornado	January 24–25	2023	Texas, Louisiana, Florida	19	0		A rare low-end EF3 tornado struck Pasadena and Deer Park, Texas, injuring three and causing $6.6 million in damage. The tornado was so powerful that it knocked down three large metal transmission towers. This was the strongest cold-season tornado to hit the Houston area since 1992. The tornado was part of a small outbreak that produced 18 other tornadoes. (4 significant)
February 2023 North American storm complex	February 26–27	2023	South Central United States, Midwestern United States	31	1		Several tornadoes occurred across the Great Plains and Midwestern United States. On February 26, three EF2 tornadoes touched down in Oklahoma. The first one caused a fatality and significant damage near the town of Cheyenne, while the other two struck Norman and Shawnee respectively. (3 significant, 1 killer)
Early-March 2023 North American storm complex	March 1–3	2023	Southern United States, Midwestern United States	35	0		Numerous tornadoes touched down across the Southern United States to the Great Lakes region. On March 2, an EF2 tornado caused significant damage near Kirby, Arkansas. The next day, an EF2 tornado caused significant damage near Fremont, Kentucky. (2 significant)
Tornado outbreak of March 24–27, 2023	March 24–27	2023	Southeastern United States	35	23		A slow-moving system sparked a small but destructive four-day outbreak of tornadoes. One supercell in Mississippi on March 24 produced three large long-tracked tornadoes, the first of which was a violent, high-end EF4 tornado that struck Rolling Fork, Midnight, and Silver City, killing 17 people. The storm then produced an EF3 tornado that struck Black Hawk and Winona, killing three people. A subsequent EF3 tornado from the storm killed two people as it passed near or moved directly through Egypt, New Wren, Amory, and Smithville. An early-morning EF2 tornado also killed a person on the north side of Hartselle, Alabama. Scattered tornado activity continued throughout the rest of the outbreak, with a few strong tornadoes touching down, including another EF3 tornado that caused major damage in North West Point, Georgia, injuring five people. (10 significant, 1 violent, 4 killer)
Tornado outbreak of March 31 – April 1, 2023	March 31 – April 1	2023	Midwestern United States, Southern United States, Eastern United States	146	26		A very large and deadly tornado outbreak produced widespread tornadic activity across large portions of the Midwestern, Southern and Eastern United States. On March 31, the SPC issued two tornado-driven high risk areas; the first was in southeastern Iowa, northwestern Illinois, and far northeastern Missouri, while the second included eastern Arkansas, southwestern Tennessee, and northern Mississippi. That afternoon, numerous tornadic supercells developed over the northern high-risk area, producing numerous tornadoes, including an EF3 tornado near Martinsburg, Iowa, and a low-end EF4 tornado that swept away a home near Keota. Over a dozen EF2 tornadoes also touched down and one EF1 tornado collapsed the roof of Apollo Theatre in Belvidere, Illinois, during a sold-out concert, killing one person and injuring over three dozen people. Other tornadoes also touched down in Indiana that evening, including multiple EF3 tornadoes, one of which struck Robinson, Illinois, and Sullivan, Indiana, killing six people while another one killed two people near Spencer, Indiana. To the south, supercell development was much more isolated, but the storms that did form were discrete and produced very large, long-tracked, intense tornadoes. This included a long-tracked high-end EF3 tornado that moved through the Little Rock, Arkansas metropolitan injuring dozens of people (one indirect fatality also occurred). Other deadly, intense, long-tracked tornadoes caused fatalities in or near Wynne, Arkansas, Covington, Tennessee, Adamsville, Tennessee, Pontotoc, Mississippi, and Hazel Green, Alabama. Later that afternoon on April 1, a localized, but intense outbreak of 10 tornadoes struck the Philadelphia metropolitan area along with Central and South Jersey. An extremely rare EF3 tornado killed a person in Sussex County, Delaware, while three EF2 tornadoes touched down in New Jersey. Along with the tornadoes, hundreds of damaging wind, large hail, and flooding reports were received while areas on the back side of the system had either wildfires or a blizzard. (44 significant, 1 violent, 9 killer)
Tornado outbreak sequence of June 14–19, 2023	June 14–19	2023	Midwestern United States, Southern United States, Eastern United States	92	4		A multi-day outbreak sequence of significant tornado and severe weather activity occurred across the south central and southeastern United States, as well as the Ohio Valley. On June 15, an EF3 tornado struck the city of Perryton, Texas, resulting in major damage and three fatalities, along with up to 100 injuries. A cluster of supercells also produced 13 tornadoes in southeastern Michigan and northern Ohio, including three that were rated EF2 (one of which struck northern Toledo) and another EF2 tornado struck Pensacola Beach, Florida that night. Three days later on June 18 an outbreak of 22 tornadoes struck mainly the southeastern United States (a rarity for that region during that time of year). An EF3 tornado produced significant damage near the town of Louin, Mississippi, killing one and injuring 25. Three other EF2 tornadoes also touched down. (14 significant, 2 killer)
Tornado outbreak sequence of June 20–26, 2023	June 20–26	2023	South Central United States, Midwestern United States, Eastern United States, Manitoba, Ontario	115	5		Another wave of significant tornado and severe weather activity occurred immediately after the previous one across mostly the northern United States and Ohio Valley, as well as Manitoba and Ontario in Canada, although many of the tornadoes moved over open terrain and were unratable. June 21 featured 43 mostly brief, unratable tornadoes, but 36 of them touched down in Colorado, making it the largest single-day outbreak in the state's history. All but three of these tornadoes touched down in Washington County, including 27 tornadoes alone near Akron, and three of them were rated EF2. Further to the south, a destructive high-end EF3 tornado struck the west side of Matador, Texas, killing four people. Several strong tornadoes touched down on June 23, including an EF3 tornado southwest of Granada, Colorado, the first tornado of such strength in the state since 2015, and an EF2 tornado that struck North Antelope Rochelle Mine in Wyoming, injuring eight people. Nine tornadoes touched down across three states and Ontario on June 25, including an EF2 tornado that killed a person in Rusk, Indiana. (12 significant, 2 killer)
Tornado outbreak sequence of August 4–8, 2023	August 4–8	2023	Great Plains, Midwestern, and Eastern United States	53	0		This outbreak sequence produced strong tornadoes in Missouri, Illinois, Tennessee, New York, and Colorado. No tornadic fatalities occurred, but two non-tornadic deaths were recorded. (6 significant)
December 2023 Tennessee tornado outbreak	December 9–10	2023	Southern United States	18	7		A small but intense outbreak of tornadoes occurred across the southern United States, most severely affecting Tennessee. On December 9, a large EF3 tornado caused major damage in Clarksville, Tennessee, killing four people. Later that evening, an EF2 tornado produced significant damage in Madison, Hendersonville and Gallatin, Tennessee, killing three people and prompting a tornado emergency. (5 significant, 2 killer)
January 8–10, 2024 North American storm complex	January 8–10	2024	Southern United States	38	2		An outbreak of tornadoes affected several areas across the southern United States. The strongest of which was an intense waterspout that produced EF3 damage after moving ashore in Panama City Beach, Florida in the early morning hours of January 9. Later that day, an EF2 tornado killed a person near Cottonwood, Alabama, and an EF1 tornado killed a person near Claremont, North Carolina. (7 significant, 2 killer)
Tornado outbreak of March 13–15, 2024	March 13–15	2024	Midwestern United States, Southern United States	34	4		Numerous tornadoes affected areas across the midwestern and southern United States. On March 13, two EF2 tornadoes touched down in Kansas, near the communities of Alta Vista and Rossville. The following day on March 14, more significant severe weather activity took place across the Ohio Valley, with a large EF3 tornado causing major damage in Wapakoneta, Lakeview, and Russells Point, Ohio, killing three and injuring 27. Shortly after, an EF3 tornado struck Winchester, Indiana, killing one and injuring 39. That same day, five separate EF2 tornadoes also produced damage near Milton, Kentucky, Selma, Indiana, Plymouth and West Mansfield, Ohio, as well as Hot Springs Village, Arkansas. (9 significant, 2 killer)
Tornado outbreak and derecho of April 1–3, 2024	April 1–3	2024	Midwestern United States, Southeastern United States	86	0		Numerous, mostly weak tornadoes occurred over a 3-day period, largely in the Ohio River Valley. A majority of the tornadoes were associated with a derecho that tracked from Missouri to West Virginia on the morning of April 2, which included four EF2 tornadoes and four EF1 tornadoes that moved through areas just north of Evansville, Indiana. That afternoon, a supercell spawned an EF2 tornado that injured 22 people in the northern suburbs of Louisville, Kentucky. That night, another EF2 tornado injured two people in Conyers, Georgia. The severe weather outbreak caused no tornadic deaths, but five people were killed in non-tornadic events. (14 significant)
Tornado outbreak of April 25–28, 2024	April 25–28	2024	Midwestern United States, South Central United States	165	6		A significant multi-day outbreak affected multiple areas across the south-central and midwestern United States. The outbreak started with five weak EFU tornadoes on April 25. On April 26, several strong to intense tornadoes touched down across the Central Plains. This included multiple destructive tornadoes that touched down in the Omaha metropolitan area. An EF3 tornado caused damage near Lincoln, Nebraska, while a violent EF4 tornado caused heavy damage in Elkhorn and near Blair. Another EF3 tornado struck Eppley Airfield in Omaha before causing major damage near Crescent, Iowa, and another EF3 tornado killed a person in Minden, Iowa. The following day on April 27, activity shifted further south across Oklahoma, where a powerful EF3 tornado struck Sulphur, killing one person. That same night, another EF3 tornado passed near Spaulding, Holdenville, and Bearden killing two people, and a violent EF4 tornado caused major damage and killed a person near the community of Marietta. Only weak tornadoes occurred on April 28, but one high-end EF1 tornado killed a person near Trinity, Texas. (25 significant, 2 violent, 5 killer)
Tornado outbreak of May 6–10, 2024	May 6–10	2024	Midwestern United States, Southern United States	180	5		A widespread tornado outbreak produced tornadoes across the southern and midwestern United States. On May 6, a rare tornado-driven high risk outlook was issued for portions of Kansas and Oklahoma. That night, a violent EF4 tornado struck Barnsdall and Bartlesville, Oklahoma, killing two people and prompting the issuance of a tornado emergency. The following day on May 7, another outbreak occurred in the Great Lakes region. This included four EF2 tornadoes that caused significant damage across Michigan and Ohio, one of which prompted a tornado emergency for areas near Sherwood, Michigan, which was the first time such an alert had ever been issued in the state, and another that injured 16 people in Portage, Michigan. The next day on May 8, another outbreak occurred across the Tennessee Valley. A powerful EF3 tornado caused major damage near Columbia, Tennessee, killing one and prompting the issuance of another tornado emergency. Later that evening, another EF3 tornado caused severe damage near Rogersville, Alabama, an EF2 tornado damaged several neighborhoods in Huntsville, Alabama, and another EF3 tornado that led to the issuance of another tornado emergency and injured seven people near Henagar, Alabama. Only weak tornadoes occurred on May 9, but a squall line that formed that night spawned multiple tornadoes and produced widespread wind damage as it moved through the Florida Panhandle on the morning of May 10. This included three tornadoes (one rated EF1 and the other two rated EF2) and destructive straight-line winds of up to 100 mph (160 km/h) that caused widespread severe damage in and around Tallahassee, Florida. The second of the EF2 tornadoes killed two people as well. (17 significant, 1 violent, 3 killer)
Tornado outbreak of May 19–22, 2024	May 19–22	2024	Midwestern,	81	5		A major tornado outbreak affected the Midwestern United States beginning on May 19, as well as a derecho. The derecho, which formed on May 19, produced widespread wind damage and weak tornadoes across Kansas and into Missouri through the overnight hours into the morning of May 20. An isolated supercell formed in the Texas panhandle and moved eastward into Oklahoma, producing multiple tornadoes west of Oklahoma City, including a large EF2 tornado that prompted the issuance of a tornado emergency for Custer City, Oklahoma. On May 21, a violent EF4 tornado killed five people as it passed near Corning and through Greenfield, Iowa, as well as producing the third-highest tornadic wind speed, at 309–318 mph (497–512 km/h). (9 significant, 1 violent, 1 killer)
Tornado outbreak of May 25–27, 2024	May 25–27	2024	Midwestern, Eastern United States	97	15		A large tornado outbreak started late on May 25 with the resulting storms contributing to May 26 being the most active day for tornadic weather. An isolated supercell in Texas spawned an EF3 tornado that killed seven people near Valley View. To the north, a cluster of supercells that formed along the Kansas-Oklahoma border between Wichita, Kansas and Oklahoma City spawned numerous significant tornadoes and generated destructive straight-line winds of up to 100 mph (160 km/h) as it moved eastward through southern Missouri and northern Arkansas. An EF3 tornado killed two people as it passed through Claremore and moved through areas northwest of Pryor, Oklahoma. Additional EF3 tornadoes killed four people near Pyatt, Arkansas, one person near Briarcliff, and two people (albeit indirectly) near Sikeston, Missouri. Several other supercells that formed that afternoon produced additional tornadoes, including an EF3 tornado that passed through areas previously impacted by the 2021 Western Kentucky tornado, killing one person. (23 significant, 5 killer)
Hurricane Beryl tornado outbreak	July 8–10	2024	Texas, Louisiana, Arkansas, Mississippi, Indiana, Kentucky, New York, Ontario	68	1		Hurricane Beryl spawned a three-day tornado outbreak that broke several records. A large, very long-tracked low-end EF2 tornado killed a woman east of Benton, Louisiana on July 8, an intense low-end EF3 tornado caused major damage on the east side of Mt. Vernon, Indiana on July 9, and a low-end EF2 tornado destroyed farm buildings southeast of Eden, New York on July 10. (10 significant, 1 killer)
Severe weather sequence of July 13–16, 2024	July 13–16	2024	North Dakota, Illinois, Indiana, Iowa, Wisconsin, and New York (state)	90	1		A deadly Derecho impacted the Midwestern United States, specifically Illinois. The derecho produced 49 tornadoes, with 32 being in NWS Chicago's forecast area, which broke the previous record of 22 from March 31, 2023.(3 significant, 1 killer)
Hurricane Milton tornado outbreak	October 8–9	2024	Florida	45	6		Hurricane Milton spawned a significant tornado outbreak across Florida, primarily on October 9. Several strong to intense tornadoes touched down across the Florida Peninsula, including three separate EF3 tornadoes that affected Lakeport, Wellington, and Fort Pierce, the last of which having killed six people. (9 significant, 1 killer)
Tornado outbreak of November 2–5, 2024	November 2–5	2024	West South Central states	44	0		Several tornadoes touched down across the central and southern United States. The most intense activity occurred on November 3, with three separate EF3 tornadoes touching down across Oklahoma, causing major damage in Oklahoma City, Comanche, and Harrah. That same day, an EF2 tornado caused significant damage near Purdy, Oklahoma. The following day on November 4, two EF2 tornadoes struck the communities of Tenkiller, Oklahoma and Little Flock, Arkansas respectively. (6 significant)
Tornado outbreak of December 28–29, 2024	December 28–29	2024	Deep South, Southeastern United States, Ohio Valley	109	1		A tornado outbreak affected multiple areas across the southern United States. Activity began on December 28 in southeast Texas, where an EF3 tornado caused major damage in Porter Heights. Shortly after, an EF2 tornado caused significant damage and killed a person in Hillcrest, and a long-tracked EF3 tornado struck primarily rural areas near Port Arthur. Additional tornadoes would touch down as activity spread further eastward that night and into the following day, with an EF3 tornado striking McCall Creek, Mississippi, as well as two separate EF2 tornadoes striking Lake Como, and Wayne County, Mississippi respectively. (6 significant, 1 killer)
Tornado outbreak of March 14–16, 2025	March 14–16	2025	Midwestern United States, Southern United States, Eastern United States	117	23		A devastating three-day tornado outbreak, the largest on record for the month of March, affected areas across the United States, particularly in central and eastern regions of the country. It began with intense activity on March 14 across parts of the Mississippi Valley and the Ozarks, where two separate EF4 tornadoes caused major damage in Franklin and Diaz, Arkansas. Eight EF3 tornadoes would also touch down across the area that same night, with one prompting a tornado emergency in Van Buren and Fremont, Missouri. In total, six of these tornadoes resulted in a combined 13 deaths. A tornado-driven high risk outlook would ultimately be issued for the following day on March 15 across parts of Alabama and Mississippi, with multiple strong to violent tornadoes touching down for the second day in a row. That afternoon, an EF4 tornado destroyed numerous homes and killed five people near Tylertown and Bassfield, Mississippi, prompting a tornado emergency for the latter community. Shortly after, an EF3 tornado affected many of the same areas after taking a highly similar path, killing one. Later on, three more fatal tornadoes would touch down, including an EF3 tornado that killed two people in Plantersville, Alabama, as well as two EF2 tornadoes that struck Seminary, Mississippi and Winterboro, Alabama, both resulting in one death each. Activity slowed down the following day on March 16, largely producing only weak tornadoes along the Eastern Seaboard before the system exited the country on March 17. (44 significant, 3 violent, 11 killer)
Tornado outbreak and floods of April 2–7, 2025	April 2–7	2025	Midwestern United States, Southern United States	157	8		A large and long-lasting tornado outbreak affected central and eastern regions of the United States, beginning with a tornado-driven high risk across parts of the lower Mississippi Valley on April 2. An EF3 tornado would go on to strike near Latty, Missouri that afternoon, with another EF3 tornado causing major damage near Lake City and Monette, Arkansas shortly after, and an EF2 tornado indirectly killing a person in Delta, Missouri that same evening. Continuing into the early morning hours of April 3, four separate EF3 tornadoes struck the communities of Jeffersontown, Kentucky, Senatobia and Slayden, Mississippi, as well as Selmer, Tennessee, with the latter two resulting in a combined seven deaths. Activity became milder starting the following day on April 4 and beyond, with several weak to strong tornadoes occurring across several areas of the south as the slow-moving weather system passed through the country, including an EF2 tornado that killed a person in Stringer, Mississippi on April 6. (39 significant, 3 killer)
Tornado outbreak of May 15–16, 2025	May 15–16	2025	Midwestern United States, Ohio Valley	61	27		A devastating tornado outbreak struck multiple areas of the United States. Beginning on May 15, four separate EF2 tornadoes caused significant damage in Wisconsin, with several other weaker tornadoes affecting the Great Lakes region. More intense activity would occur on May 16, with an EF3 tornado causing major damage near downtown St. Louis, Missouri that afternoon, killing five people. Quickly after, another EF3 tornado would result in two deaths near Blodgett, Missouri, while an EF2 tornado killed a person near Linton, Indiana. Later that evening, a high-end EF4 tornado affected areas near Marion, Illinois, while an EF3 tornado struck near Morganfield, Kentucky. Further southeast, a long-lived supercell produced another EF4 tornado that killed 19 people and resulted in catastrophic damage in Somerset and London, Kentucky. (16 significant, 2 violent, 4 killer)
Tornado outbreak of May 18–21, 2025	May 18–21	2025	Central United States, Great Plains	133	0		A major outbreak produced numerous large, long-tracked tornadoes, especially over Kansas on May 18. An EF3 tornado struck Grinnell, injuring two people. That night, a cyclic supercell produced eight tornadoes, including five that were rated EF3, across south-central Kansas from the Greensburg area to Plevna. Both cities were placed under tornado emergencies with the latter city being hit. The next day, another massive EF3 tornado passed near Blanco, Oklahoma, injuring one person. On May 20, several tornadoes impacted North Alabama, including an EF2 tornado that prompted a tornado emergency for Huntsville. (22 significant)
Tornado outbreak and derecho of June 19–22, 2025	June 19–22	2025	Saskatchewan, Minnesota, North Dakota, New York	40	6		A multi-day outbreak produced several strong tornadoes across the Upper Midwest, most severely affecting North Dakota. First beginning on June 19, two EF2 tornadoes occurred in Saskatchewan. The next day in North Dakota, a derecho would track through the state while two supercells in front of it dropped multiple significant to intense tornadoes. This included an EF3 tornado near Spiritwood, as well as an extremely violent EF5 tornado near Enderlin that killed three people. The latter tornado was the first to be rated EF5 since 2013. Later, there would be a lull in activity on June 21 before an EF1 tornado embedded within a squall line killed three people in the early morning hours of June 22 in Clark Mills, New York. (8 significant, 1 violent, 2 killer)
Tornado outbreak of March 5–7, 2026	March 5–7	2026	Central United States, Midwestern United States	32	8		An intense outbreak particularly affected the Great Plains and Great Lakes region. On March 5, several tornadoes would strike parts of Oklahoma and Kansas, including two separate EF2 tornadoes that struck areas near Fairview and Helena, Oklahoma, with the former resulting in two deaths. Activity became more widespread the following day on March 6, first beginning in Michigan, where a high-end EF3 tornado killed three people and injured 12 after striking Union City, in addition to a deadly EF1 tornado near Edwardsburg and an EF2 tornado in Three Rivers. Later that evening, numerous tornadoes would touch down in Oklahoma for the second day in a row, including an EF2 tornado near Collinsville, as well as a large EF3 tornado in Beggs that resulted in two deaths. The next morning on March 7, two EF2 tornadoes affected areas near Prospect, Texas and Willisville, Arkansas, with activity quickly waning thereafter. (8 significant, 4 killer)
Tornado outbreak of March 10–12, 2026	March 10–12	2026	Southern Plains, Midwestern United States, Eastern United States	106	3		A large outbreak affected areas across central and eastern parts of the United States. On March 10, a long-tracked EF3 tornado caused major damage in Kankakee and Aroma Park, Illinois, as well as Lake Village, Indiana, resulting in three deaths and 11 injuries. Shortly after, an EF2 tornado struck areas near Knox, Indiana, prompting a tornado emergency. Numerous other weak to strong tornadoes would occur that night and into the following two days across the country, including an EF2 tornado that struck near Golden, Oklahoma on March 11, as well as another EF2 tornado near Marshallville, Georgia on March 12. (4 significant, 1 killer)
Tornado outbreak of April 17–18, 2026	April 17–18	2026	Central United States, Midwestern United States	88	0		A major outbreak affected areas across the central and Midwestern portions of the United States. Several significant tornadoes touched down within the outbreak, including a high-end EF2 tornado that injured two people and damaged multiple houses in Rochester, Minnesota, and another high-end EF2 tornado that caused severe damage to homes in Lena, Illinois. An EF3 tornado also caused major damage to a home near Cream, Wisconsin, and many homes were damaged or destroyed by an EF3 tornado that impacted parts of Ringle, Wisconsin. (10 significant)
Tornado outbreak sequence of April 23–28, 2026	April 23–28	2026	Central United States	119	1		A sequence of significant tornado outbreaks took place across the central United States. On April 23, an EF4 impacted southern portions of Enid, Oklahoma, destroying several houses and causing extreme damage to trees. On the evening of April 25, a high-end EF2 caused major damage to houses in Runaway Bay, Texas, killing one person and injuring multiple people. On April 28, an EF3 tornado impacted portions of Mineral Wells, Texas, severely damaging several houses and destroying multiple warehouses. (7 significant, 1 violent, 1 killer)
Tornado outbreak and derecho of June 9–11, 2026	June 9–11	2026	Canadian Prairies, Southern Great Lakes	104	0		(9 significant)
Tornado outbreak and derecho of June 21–22, 2026	June 21–22	2026	Ohio River Valley	66	3		(7 significant, 2 killer)

== Canada ==
List of Canada tornadoes and tornado outbreaks – 1879–present
Dates	Year	Region	Tornadoes	Fatalities	Map	Event Link
August 6	1879	Bouctouche, New Brunswick	1	5	—N/a	1879 Bouctouche tornado
September 26	1898	St. Catharines, Ontario	1	5	—N/a	—N/a
June 30	1912	Regina, Saskatchewan	1	28	—N/a	Regina Cyclone
June 17	1946	Southern Ontario	1	17	—N/a	1946 Windsor–Tecumseh, Ontario tornado
August 20	1970	Sudbury, Ontario	1	6	—N/a	Sudbury tornado
April 3–4	1974	Ontario	1	9	—N/a	1974 Super Outbreak
August 7	1979	Southern Ontario	1	2	—N/a	1979 Woodstock, Ontario tornado
May 31	1985	Ontario	14	14	—N/a	1985 United States–Canada tornado outbreak
July 31	1987	Edmonton	8	27	—N/a	Edmonton tornado
April 20	1996	Ontario	3	0	—N/a	1996 Southern Ontario tornadoes
July 2	1997	Ontario	13	5	—N/a	1997 Southeast Michigan tornado outbreak
July 14	2000	Alberta	1	12	—N/a	Pine Lake tornado
August 19	2005	Ontario	3	0	—N/a	Southern Ontario tornado outbreak of 2005
August 2	2006	Ontario, Quebec	11	0	—N/a	August 2, 2006 tornado outbreak
June 22	2007	Manitoba, Saskatchewan	8	0	—N/a	2007 Elie, Manitoba tornado
August 20	2009	Ontario	18	1	—N/a	Southern Ontario Tornado Outbreak of 2009
June 5–6	2010	Ontario	6	0	—N/a	June 5–6, 2010 tornado outbreak
August 21	2011	Ontario	1	1	—N/a	2011 Goderich, Ontario tornado
September 21	2018	Central Ontario	7	0	—N/a	2018 Ottawa–Gatineau tornadoes
June 28 - July 1	2019	Alberta, Saskatchewan	15	0	—N/a	
May 21	2022	Ontario	4	0	—N/a	May 2022 Canadian derecho
June 14	2023	Alberta	10	0	—N/a	2023 Alberta Outbreak - NTP
July 1	2023	Didsbury, Alberta	1	0	—N/a	2023 Didsbury, AB Tornado - NTP

== Mexico, Central America, Caribbean, and other areas ==
Event	Date	Area	Tornadoes	Casualties	Notes
Tenochtitlan-Tlatelolco tornado	13 August 1521 (Julian Calendar)	Tenochtitlan and Tlatelolco	–	–	First recorded tornado in Americas
Hondo Coal Mine tornado	10 May 1899	Coahuila, Mexico	–	≥22 fatalities	Deadliest Mexican tornado, also struck the city of Sabinas.
1940 Bejucal tornado	26 December 1940	Cuba	–	12 fatalities	
Easter tornadoes of 1953	5 April 1953	Bermuda	4	1 fatality, 9 injuries	Four separate tornadoes
1992 Panama City tornado	15 July 1992	Panama City, Panama	–	12 fatalities, >50 injuries	Perhaps deadliest Panamanian tornado. Possibly an F2 or F3.
1999 Cruces and Pedroso F4 tornadoes	May 1999	Cruces and Pedroso, Cuba	2	2 and injuries	Two destructive F4 tornadoes in the localities of Cruces and Pedroso.
2007 Piedras Negras tornado	24 April 2007	Piedras Negras, Coahuila, Mexico	1	3	Violent rain-wrapped F4 tornado destroyed over 300 homes and multiple businesses in Piedras Negras.
2008 Dominican Republic tornadoes	20 April 2008	Santo Domingo, Dominican Republic	–	≥2 fatalities	At least 700 people were forced to seek temporary shelter when tornadoes damaged houses
2015 Ciudad Acuña tornado	25 May 2015	Ciudad Acuña, Coahuila, Mexico	1	14	Early morning F3 tornado damaged or destroyed over 750 homes and businesses in Ciudad Acuña.
2019 Havana tornado	28 January 2019	eastern Havana, Cuba	1	6 fatalities, 193 injuries	Late-night EF4 tornado affected the neighborhoods of Regla and 10 de Octubre as well as the town of San Miguel de Padron
2020 Apodaca tornado	8 May 2020	Apodaca, Nuevo León, México	-	2 fatalities	F2 Tornado
2022 San Jose de las Lajas Tornado	15 April 2022	San José de las Lajas, Cuba	1	"Several" injuries	A tornado struck the western part of Mayabeque Province, hitting the provincial capital of San José de Las Lajas. The storm caused moderate damage to roofs of homes and buildings and injured several people.
2023 Los Arabos, Matanzas tornado	2023	Los Arabos, Matanzas, Cuba	0		A rare Supercell Tornado forms in Los Arabos, Matanzas.

== See also ==
- Lists of tornadoes and tornado outbreaks
- Lists of Canadian tornadoes and tornado outbreaks
- List of tornadoes in Washington, D.C.
- List of tornadoes in Huntsville, Alabama
- List of California tornadoes
- List of Connecticut tornadoes
- List of Illinois tornadoes
- List of Oklahoma tornadoes
- List of Rhode Island tornadoes
- Tornado records
- Tornadoes in Bermuda
- Tornadoes in the United States
- Tornadoes in Chicago
- List of tornadoes striking downtown areas
- List of tornadoes in Cleveland County, Oklahoma
