= List of United States tornadoes in 1950 =

This page documents all the known tornadoes that touched down in the United States during 1950. Hundreds of tornadoes went unnoticed in 1950 as only 201 were officially confirmed, compared to the average of over 1,000 per year.

The total count of tornadoes and ratings differs from various agencies accordingly. The article, therefore, documents information from the most contemporary official sources alongside assessments from tornado historian Thomas P. Grazulis.

== Confirmed tornadoes ==
Confirmed tornadoes by Fujita rating
FU	F0	F1	F2	F3	F4	F5	Total
0	16	86	68	24	7	0	201

== January ==
Confirmed tornadoes by Fujita rating
FU	F0	F1	F2	F3	F4	F5	Total
0	0	1	3	3	0	0	7

=== January 3 event ===
List of confirmed tornadoes – Tuesday, January 3, 1950 (Note: All dates are based on the local time zone where the tornado touched down; however, all times are in Coordinated Universal Time and dates are split at midnight CST/CDT for consistency.) (Note: Prior to 1994, only the average widths of tornado paths were officially listed.)
F#	Location	County / Parish	State	Start Coord.	Time (UTC)	Path length	Max width	Summary
F3	NE of Castle Point, MO to South Roxana, IL	St. Louis (MO), St. Charles (MO), Madison (IL)	MO, IL	38.77°N 90.22°W	17:00–?	9.5 mi (15.3 km)	150 yd (140 m)	Strong tornado destroyed or damaged 52 homes as it moved northeastward through Spanish Lake, Missouri, and Hartford, Illinois. An oil refinery in Roxana incurred damage as well. Damages were estimated at $2.75 million and three people were injured. This is the first tornado ever documented in the database.
F3	ESE of Chapman to Southern Fillmore to NW of Bingham	Montgomery, Fayette	IL	39.10°N 89.30°W	17:55–?	3.6 mi (5.8 km)	130 yd (120 m)	This intense tornado, which was produced by the same storm that produced the previous F3 tornado, "reduced" four homes and a number of barns "to splinters." Damages were estimated at $250,000 and three people were injured.
F1	Northern Van Wert	Van Wert	OH	40.88°N 84.58°W	2200	0.1 mi (0.16 km)	10 yd (9.1 m)	Damages were estimated at $25,000 and one person was injured.

=== January 13 event ===
List of confirmed tornadoes – Friday, January 13, 1950
F#	Location	County / Parish	State	Start Coord.	Time (UTC)	Path length	Max width	Summary
F3	N of Vandervort	Polk	AR	34.40°N 94.37°W	1125	0.6 mi (0.97 km)	17 yd (16 m)	1 death – This brief tornado destroyed a poorly constructed home. Damages were estimated at $2,500 and one person was injured. This was the first killer tornado in the database. Grazulis classified the tornado as an F1.

=== January 25 event ===
List of confirmed tornadoes – Wednesday, January 25, 1950
F#	Location	County / Parish	State	Start Coord.	Time (UTC)	Path length	Max width	Summary
F2	Pilot Knob	Iron	MO	37.60°N 90.68°W	0130	2.3 mi (3.7 km)	300 yd (270 m)	This tornado unroofed or destroyed a few farmhouses and several outbuildings. Damages were estimated at $250,000 and five people were injured.
F2	Momence	Kankakee	IL	41.17°N 87.33°W	0300	0 mi (0 km)	100 yd (91 m)	This tornado destroyed a CBS-built store, unroofed or otherwise damaged neighboring structures, and drove a 20-foot-long (6.1 m) steel beam into the ground. Damages were estimated at $250,000.

=== January 26 event ===
List of confirmed tornadoes – Thursday, January 26, 1950
F#	Location	County / Parish	State	Start Coord.	Time (UTC)	Path length	Max width	Summary
F2	S of Encino	Brooks	TX	26.88°N 98.12°W	0000	4.7 mi (7.6 km)	133 yd (122 m)	This tornado unroofed and wrecked a ranch-style house. Two people were injured.

== February ==
Confirmed tornadoes by Fujita rating
FU	F0	F1	F2	F3	F4	F5	Total
0	0	5	11	3	1	0	20

=== February 11–13 events ===
List of confirmed tornadoes – Saturday, February 11, 1950
F#	Location	County / Parish	State	Start Coord. (Note: All starting coordinates are based on the NCEI database and may not reflect contemporary analyses)	Time (UTC)	Path length	Width (Note: The listed width values are primarily the average/mean width of the tornadoes, with those having known maximum widths denoted by ♯. From 1952 to 1994, reports largely list mean width whereas contemporary years list maximum width. Values provided by Grazulis are the average width, with estimates being rounded down (i.e. 0.5 mi (0.80 km) is rounded down from 880 yards to 800 yards.)	Damage
F2	Alvin※	Brazoria	TX	29.42°N 95.25°W	19:10–?	7 mi (11 km)※	300 yd (270 m)†	$75,000†
F2	20 businesses and homes were destroyed or unroofed. The NCEI database incorrectly extends the path to Webster through Galveston and Harris counties.							
F3	Western La Porte†	Harris	TX	29.67°N 95.05°W	19:40–?†	15 mi (24 km)†	500 yd (460 m)†	$200,000†
F3	1 death – An intense tornado damaged 25 homes in its path, some of which it destroyed. The remaining homes lost their roofs, and in all, some 200 structures incurred damage. 20 injuries took place, and a female centenarian was killed.							
F2†	Montalba	Anderson	TX	Unknown	02:30–?	2 mi (3.2 km)	100 yd (91 m)	Unknown
F2†	Barns and a home were wrecked. Items from the buildings were strewn 1 mi (1.6 km) distant.							
F2	Chappell Hill†	Smith	TX	35°N 95.2°W	03:00–?	10 mi (16 km)†	75 yd (69 m)†	$100,000
F2	This strong tornado passed just east of Tyler, leveling 16 structures, including the store of a blacksmith and three homes. The tornado passed within 100 yd (300 ft) of a church with 300 people in attendance. Five people were injured.							
F2†	E of Pine to Omaha	Camp, Titus, Morris	TX	Unknown	05:30–?	≥2 mi (3.2 km)	20 yd (18 m)	≥$70,000
F2†	A pair of homes were wrecked near the start of the path, resulting in a pair of injuries. At Omaha a gymnasium at a school was destroyed, along with several homes.							
F3†	S of Hughes Springs to Corley to E of New Boston†	Cass, Bowie	TX	32.98°N 94.63°W	05:45†–06:30	30 mi (48 km)†	150 yd (140 m)†	$200,000†
F3†	1 death – At Hugh Springs 15 homes were a total loss and 24 others received damage. 15 injuries occurred in town. At Corley the tornado affected 15 additional homes, some of which it wrecked. Eight people were injured at Corley. In all 30 people were injured along the path.							

List of confirmed tornadoes – Sunday, February 12, 1950
F#	Location	County / Parish	State	Start Coord.	Time (UTC)	Path length	Width	Damage
F1	Downtown Dublin	Erath	TX	32.08°N 98.35°W	07:15–?	2.3 mi (3.7 km)‡	250 yd (230 m)※	$20,000※
F1	Five structures were seriously damaged.							
F2†	Baileyville	Falls	TX	Unknown	11:30–?	2 mi (3.2 km)	100 yd (91 m)	$25,000
F2†	A strong tornado destroyed 10 homes. Five people were injured.							
F2	SSW of Davis Prairie to southern Groesbeck†	Limestone	TX	31.52°N 96.55°W	11:45–?†	8 mi (13 km)†	70 yd (64 m)†	$25,000†
F2	At Groesbeck approximately 20 businesses and homes lost their roofs or were destroyed. Debris rained on the courthouse in town, though the tornado dissipated beforehand. Four people were injured.							
F2†	Gill	Harrison	TX	Unknown	16:00–?	6 mi (9.7 km)	100 yd (91 m)	Unknown
F2†	Four homes were wrecked. 10 injuries were reported.							
F2†	S of Lufkin to Beulah to S of Huntington	Polk, Angelina	TX	Unknown	16:42–?	15 mi (24 km)	100 yd (91 m)	Unknown
F2†	3 deaths – This tornado struck two rural communities, sweeping away a home and strewing the debris for acres. A father and his two children died, and three other people sustained injuries, including the mother of the children. A school was destroyed as well.							
F2†	Near Chireno	Nacogdoches	TX	Unknown	17:00–?	8 mi (13 km)	300 yd (270 m)	Unknown
F2†	This tornado wrecked six homes and injured two people.							
F3†	S of Center (TX) to Fellowship (TX) to E of Keachi (LA)†	Shelby (TX), DeSoto (LA)†	TX, LA†	31.8°N 94.2°W	17:50–?†	30 mi (48 km)†	150 yd (140 m)†	$250,000†
F3†	3 deaths – This intense, long-tracked tornado leveled a home at Fellowship, killing two people inside during lunchtime. 32 or more other injuries occurred in and near Fellowship. Other structures were damaged at Jericho. In Louisiana the tornado wrecked 12 homes, killing a third person. The tornado killed hundreds of chickens as well. In all, 37 people were injured along the path. This tornado belonged to the same family as the Shreveport F4 and ended near Logansport, Louisiana.							
F2†	Near Hell Creek†	Union	MS	34.6°N 89.12°W	18:00–?	2 mi (3.2 km)†	33 yd (30 m)‡	$20,000†
F2†	A brief tornado struck four homes and a barn. Three of the homes lost their roofs, and a barn and the fourth home were flattened.							
F2	Cane Creek※	Grant	AR	34.48°N 92.4°W	18:30–?	0.1 mi (0.16 km)‡	100 yd (91 m)	$450※
F2	A brief-but-strong tornado swept away a barn, flattened a small house, unroofed another home, destroyed an outhouse and a chicken coop, and knocked down a 2-acre (0.81 ha) swath of trees.							
F4	N of Stonewall to Barksdale Air Force Base†	Caddo, Bossier†	LA	32.35°N 93.77°W	19:00–?	20 mi (32 km)†	100 yd (91 m)†	$350,000†
F4	8 deaths – A violent tornado tracked just northwest of Forbing, leveling several homes. On the southern outskirts of Shreveport, the tornado caused two deaths. It then hit the Shreveport Holding and Reconsignment Depot, which had recently been renamed Slack Air Force Depot, near Barksdale Air Force Base. The tornado destroyed the Depot, causing the deaths of six people, including five airmen and a civilian worker. Nearby, injuries occurred in a mess hall and barracks as the tornado hit the AFB. With a forward speed of 35 mph (56 km/h), the parent supercell progressed into Arkansas, where it later spawned the Mount Holly F2 tornado. In all, 30 people were injured.							
F3†	Near Grand Cane to NE of Sligo†	DeSoto, Bossier†	LA	32.2°N 93.58°W	19:24–?†	35 mi (56 km)†	200 yd (180 m)†	$90,000†
F3†	7+ deaths – This intense tornado claimed the lives of at least three—possibly four—children in a pair of homes near Grand Cane. On a plantation, the tornado leveled a tenant home, killing three family members inside the structure. Nearby, the tornado overturned a vehicle, killing a pedestrian who was sheltering in a ditch. At least one additional fatality took place before the tornado dissipated, and 30 people were injured along the path. The NCEI database incorrectly lists the path as beginning west of Williams and ending west of Haynesville, passing southeast of the towns of Caspiana and McDade.							
F3	Zwolle to Roy† to Gibsland※	Sabine, Natchitoches, Bienville‡	LA	31.63°N 93.65°W	20:00–?※	74.5 mi (119.9 km)‡	100 yd (91 m)※	≥$50,000†
F3	9 deaths – This tornado family first generated intermittent, F1-level damage at Zwolle, along with downburst-related effects. At Roy, near Castor, the tornado destroyed or damaged 25 homes, some of which were leveled, with six deaths in one of them, all of which were in one family; in all eight people died in town. A final fatality occurred just northeast of Castor. The tornado obliterated numerous small homes in its path, but its damage is poorly documented outside Roy. Bodies of the dead were carried as far as 1/4 mi (0.40 km) from their original locations. 40 people were injured along the path.							
F2	N of Mount Holly†	Union, Ouachita†	AR	33.27°N 92.95°W	21:00–?	6 mi (9.7 km)†	100 yd (91 m)	$20,000※
F2	A strong tornado damaged electrical wires, a store, and an oil camp. Additionally, the tornado leveled many barns and three homes.							
FU※	Near Lovell Lake–LaBelle	Jefferson	TX	Unknown	21:30–?	Unknown	50 yd (46 m)	$8,100
FU※	Eight homes were destroyed or damaged. One person was injured.							
F1	E of Epps‡	East Carroll	LA	32.6°N 91.33°W	05:00–?	0.5 mi (0.80 km)‡	33 yd (30 m)‡	$25,000‡
F1	A brief, weak tornado struck several structures, causing minimal damage.							

List of confirmed tornadoes – Monday, February 13, 1950
F#	Location	County / Parish	State	Start Coord.	Time (UTC)	Path length	Width	Damage
F1	Rosemark	Shelby	TN	35.35°N 89.77°W	07:00–?	0.2 mi (0.32 km)‡	7 yd (6.4 m)‡	$2,000※
F1	A short-lived tornado destroyed outbuildings and caused extensive damage to a few farmhouses. Eight people were injured inside one of the houses.							
F2	Hurricane Hill※	Lauderdale	TN	35.75°N 89.48°W	08:00–?	2 mi (3.2 km)†	20 yd (18 m)†	$5,000※
F2	9 deaths – A very brief but devastating tornado struck a residential area, leveling a few small homes on the hilltop. Two parents and their six children were inside one of the homes that were swept away. The structure, which was poorly built, was lofted 85 yd (255 ft) before disintegrating, killing all nine occupants. An injury occurred as well. As of 2017, this is the deadliest F2/EF2 tornado ever recorded in the United States.							
F2	Southeastern New Albany†	Union	MS	34.6°N 89.12°W	09:20–?	5 mi (8.0 km)†	33 yd (30 m)‡	$25,000‡
F2	This tornado leveled a small residence in its path. Additionally, it destroyed three barns nearby. The NCEI database lists a pair of injuries and three fatalities, but Grazulis does not list any casualties.							

=== February 27 event ===
List of confirmed tornadoes – Monday, February 27, 1950
F#	Location	County / Parish	State	Start Coord.	Time (UTC)	Path length	Max width	Summary
F2	Southern Lake Hefner	Oklahoma	OK	35.55°N 97.60°W	1620	2.0 mi (3.2 km)	50 yd (46 m)	Damages were estimated at $25,000. Grazulis did not list the tornado as an F2 or stronger.

== March ==
Confirmed tornadoes by Fujita rating
FU	F0	F1	F2	F3	F4	F5	Total
0	1	6	12	2	0	0	21

=== March 1 event ===
List of confirmed tornadoes – Wednesday, March 1, 1950
F#	Location	County / Parish	State	Start Coord.	Time (UTC)	Path length	Max width	Summary
F1	Collinsville	Lauderdale	MS	32.50°N 88.85°W	0830	0.1 mi (0.16 km)	10 yd (9.1 m)	This short-lived tornado destroyed, unroofed, or otherwise damaged at least six homes and a barn. Grazulis classified the tornado as an F2.

=== March 16 event ===
List of confirmed tornadoes – Thursday, March 16, 1950
F#	Location	County / Parish	State	Start Coord.	Time (UTC)	Path length	Max width	Summary
F2	SSW of Marineland	St. Johns	FL	29.65°N 81.22°W	1515	1.5 mi (2.4 km)	150 yd (140 m)	Damages were estimated at $25,000. Grazulis did not list the tornado as an F2 or stronger.

=== March 19 event ===
List of confirmed tornadoes – Sunday, March 19, 1950
F#	Location	County / Parish	State	Start Coord.	Time (UTC)	Path length	Max width	Summary
F1	Dequincy	Calcasieu	LA	30.45°N 93.45°W	1330	2.0 mi (3.2 km)	33 yd (30 m)	Two people were injured and damages were estimated at $25,000.
F2	Donaldsonville	Ascension	LA	30.10°N 91.00°W	1915	1.0 mi (1.6 km)	50 yd (46 m)	Damages were estimated at $25,000. Grazulis did not list the tornado as an F2 or stronger.
F0	SE of Barataria to NNE of Davant	Jefferson, Plaquemines	LA	29.70°N 90.10°W	1915	18.1 mi (29.1 km)	27 yd (25 m)	Tornado struck Alliance and Carlisle. Damages were estimated at $25,000.

=== March 26 event ===
List of confirmed tornadoes – Sunday, March 26, 1950 (Note: Prior to 1994, only the average widths of tornado paths were officially listed.)
F#	Location	County / Parish	State	Start Coord.	Time (UTC)	Path length	Max width	Summary
F2	Western Arkadelphia to Southern Midway to SE of Social Hill	Clark, Hot Spring	AR	34.12°N 93.07°W	01:30–?	17.4 mi (28.0 km)	150 yd (140 m)	This tornado touched down on the west side of Arkadelphia and moved northeastward along the Ouachita River, hitting the south side of Midway before dissipating. Three homes and 13 farm buildings were destroyed while six homes and 16 other buildings were damaged. Some livestock were killed as well. Damages were estimated at $50,000 and three people were injured.
F3	ESE of Violet Hill to S of Horseshoe Bend	Izard	AR	36.15°N 91.83°W	01:31–?	5.7 mi (9.2 km)	200 yd (180 m)	An intense tornado destroyed or damaged a church, a few stores, a large consolidated school building, 30 homes, and many barns. Two of the homes were unroofed as well. Damages were estimated at $250,000 and one person was injured. Tornado researcher Thomas P. Grazulis classified the tornado as an F2.
F2	Meadowcliff to Little Rock to W of Booker	Pulaski	AR	34.70°N 92.35°W	02:30–?	10.4 mi (16.7 km)	600 yd (550 m)	This strong tornado first touched down on the southwest side of Little Rock in Meadowcliff and passed through Geyer Springs. A drive-in theater screen was damaged and two cars in the theater lot were overturned, injuring five people. The tornado then progressed northeastward and struck the residential district, causing considerable damage to roofs before striking the business district of Downtown Little Rock. There was extensive damage to roofs, windows, plate glass, signs, and brick and masonry parapets. A large radio antenna mast toppled from roof of the Gazette Building. The tornado then crossed the Arkansas River into North Little Rock, where it did considerable damage to roofs, trees and signs, and injured two more people. The tornado weakened after that, causing slight crop damage before dissipating west of Booker. Seven people were injured and losses totaled $250,000. Considerable water damage by rain entering buildings through torn roofs and broken windows also occurred as a result of this tornado. Some small hail was also observed as well.
F3	S of Hickory Plains to E of Jasmine	Prairie, White	AR	34.98°N 91.73°W	03:15–?	14.9 mi (24.0 km)	1,760 yd (1,610 m)	This massive, mile-wide tornado accompanied by moderate hail likely came from the same storm that produced the Little Rock tornado. Timber, farm buildings, farm equipment, and 33 homes were heavily damaged or destroyed and livestock was injured. Minimal crop damage also occurred. Damages were estimated at $250,000 and 20 people were injured. The CDNS report list 15 injuries. Grazulis listed the tornado as an F2.
F2	McClelland/Kramer to Gregory	Woodruff	AR	35.10°N 91.40°W	05:30–?	5.4 mi (8.7 km)	833 yd (762 m)	A strong tornado, which likely came from the same storm that produced the Little Rock and Hickory Plains tornadoes, occurred southeast of Georgetown. A total of seven to 10 homes were heavily damaged or destroyed, of which a few shifted and collapsed on their foundations, and several barns were destroyed as well. Two people were injured, but no damage value was given.

=== March 27 event ===
List of confirmed tornadoes – Monday, March 27, 1950
F#	Location	County / Parish	State	Start Coord.	Time (UTC)	Path length	Max width	Summary
F2	S of McAlester	Pittsburg	OK	34.85°N 95.75°W	09:00–?	0.1 mi (0.16 km)	77 yd (70 m)	A broom handle factory was obliterated by this funnel-less but strong, southeastward-moving tornado. Local residents were able to identify the damage as tornadic due to the pattern of the debris. Damages were estimated at $2,500. Grazulis did not list the tornado as an F2 or stronger.
F2	W of Belzoni	Humphreys	MS	33.17°N 90.55°W	11:00–?	0.1 mi (0.16 km)	33 yd (30 m)	1 death – A couple of barns and six tenant homes were destroyed while one large home was shifted on its foundation. Two people were injured.
F1	W of Grimes, LA to Transylvania, LA to W of Fitler, MS	East Carroll (LA), Issaquena (MS)	LA, MS	32.63°N 91.28°W	12:00–?	15.3 mi (24.6 km)	17 yd (16 m)	A total of 30 tenant homes and an unspecified number of barns were destroyed. Damages were estimated at $25,000 and two people were injured. Grazulis classified the tornado as an F2. This may have been the same tornado that struck Belzoni, Mississippi.
F2	N of Kosciusko to S of French Camp	Attala	MS	33.13°N 89.57°W	13:30–?	11.9 mi (19.2 km)	33 yd (30 m)	Barns were destroyed and a home was unroofed, although no damage estimate was given.
F2	Forest Hill to Downtown Jackson to SW of Sallis	Hinds, Rankin, Madison, Attala	MS	32.28°N 90.27°W	13:45–?	59.3 mi (95.4 km)	50 yd (46 m)	This was the first of two strong tornadoes to hit Downtown Jackson along similar beginning paths before diverging. It also struck Forest Hill, Bradie, Wells, Meltonville, Cameron and Truitt. Damages were estimated at $500,000 and seven people were injured. Grazulis did not list the tornado as an F2 or stronger.
F2	Forest Hill to Downtown Jackson to Pisgah	Hinds, Rankin	MS	32.28°N 90.27°W	13:45–?	31.9 mi (51.3 km)	50 yd (46 m)	This was the second of two strong tornadoes to hit Downtown Jackson along similar beginning paths before diverging. It also struck Forest Hill, Bradie, Flowood, Northern Wells, Luckney, and Pisgah. Damages were estimated at $500,000 and six people were injured. Grazulis did not list the tornado as an F2 or stronger.
F1	Wilson	East Feliciana	LA	30.92°N 91.13°W	14:30–?	0.5 mi (0.80 km)	27 yd (25 m)	Damages were estimated at $25,000. The tornado was not listed in the CDNS report.
F2	Abbott	Clay	MS	33.67°N 88.78°W	14:45–?	4.7 mi (7.6 km)	33 yd (30 m)	No damage estimate was given. Grazulis did not list the tornado as an F2 or stronger.
F1	W of Midway	Tishomingo	MS	34.73°N 88.27°W	17:00–?	0.1 mi (0.16 km)	10 yd (9.1 m)	A Masonic lodge, two churches, and 24 homes were unroofed, damaged, or destroyed. Damages were estimated at $25,000 and two people were injured. Grazulis classified the tornado as an F2.
F1	W of McMinnville	Warren	TN	35.68°N 85.77°W	21:00–?	0.2 mi (0.32 km)	7 yd (6.4 m)	A small tornado moved northeastward, damaging buildings, trees, and power and telephone lines. Losses totaled $2,500.
F2	Colfax to NNW of Anchor	McLean	IL	40.57°N 88.60°W	22:30–?	3.0 mi (4.8 km)	50 yd (46 m)	This strong tornado, which was described as having a "whitish" colored, funnel, destroyed several outbuildings on one farm and knocked down power lines. Damages were estimated at $2,500. Grazulis did not list the tornado as an F2 or stronger.

== April ==
Confirmed tornadoes by Fujita rating
FU	F0	F1	F2	F3	F4	F5	Total
0	0	6	4	3	2	0	15

=== April 2 event ===
List of confirmed tornadoes – Monday, April 2, 1950
F#	Location	County / Parish	State	Start coord.	Time (UTC)	Path length	Max. width	Summary
F3	NW of Tuckerman	Jackson	AR	35.75°N 91.22°W	21:30–?	2.5 miles (4.0 km)	10 yards (9.1 m)	1 death – This intense tornado, moving northeastward, destroyed a home, five barns, one hay shed, two garages, and 10 t (22,000 lb; 10,000 kg) of hay. One home was unroofed as well. There were eight injuries, one of which was serious, and $2,500 in damage. The CDNS report listed only four injuries. Grazulis classified the tornado as an F2.
F2	Carney	Lincoln	OK	35.82°N 97.02°W	00:00–00:20	1 mile (1.6 km)	10 yards (9.1 m)	Strong tornado accompanied by strong winds and hail formed west of Anderson and touched down three times as it moved southeastward through Carney and Dudley throwing debris high into the air. There was $2,500 in damages. Advance warning allowed most residents to take shelter in storm cellars before the storm, which reportedly had a high-pitched roar. Grazulis did not list the tornado as an F2 or stronger.
F1	Yarbro	Mississippi	AR	35.98°N 89.92°W	00:00–?	0.8 miles (1.3 km)	100 yards (91 m)	Tornado moved eastward directly through Yarbro. Two homes were heavily damaged, one of which was destroyed, and there was considerable damage to farm buildings, power and telephone lines, and sign boards. The tornado destroyed a barn as well. Losses totaled $2,500. Some small, non-damaging hail also fell with this storm. Grazulis classified the tornado as an F2.

=== April 3 event ===
List of known tornadoes – Tuesday, April 3, 1950
F#	Location	County / Parish	State	Start coord.	Time (UTC)	Path length	Max. width	Summary
F1	E of Tulsa	Tulsa	OK	36.13°N 95.83°W	22:15–?	1 mile (1.6 km)	33 yards (30 m)	An airplane at the Harvey Young Airport sustained $2,500 in damage.

=== April 18 event ===
List of known tornadoes – Tuesday, April 18, 1950
F#	Location	County / Parish	State	Start coord.	Time (UTC)	Path length	Max. width	Summary
F3	Wheelerville to W of Satsuma	Mobile	AL	30.67°N 88.2°W	07:30–?	14 miles (23 km)	100 yards (91 m)	This intense tornado first hit in the Wragg Swamp west of Mobile and moved north-northeastward past the University of South Alabama campus before turning more northeastward. It passed within 1/2 mi (0.80 km) of the Spring Hill seismograph, causing an abrupt vibration which lasted for one minute and 13 seconds. A building materials warehouse and 11 homes were destroyed and other buildings damaged. The tornado also tossed a home against another 200 yd (180 m) away. There were 15 injuries and $25,000 in damages. Grazulis classified the tornado as an F2.
F2	NW of Spanish Fort to Blakeley	Baldwin	AL	30.7°N 87.92°W	07:45–?	2 miles (3.2 km)	150 yards (140 m)	This event was listed as a probable tornado by the CDNS report because the fallen trees indicated straight-line winds, but the narrow path suggested that the damage area was possibly in the right hand side of a large, weak tornado that moved north-northeastward instead. One house was unroofed and three other buildings were damaged. Losses totaled $2,500.

=== April 24 event ===
List of known tornadoes – Monday, April 24, 1950
F#	Location	County / Parish	State	Start coord.	Time (UTC)	Path length	Max. width	Summary
F1	Donaldsonville	Ascension	LA	30.1°N 90.03°W	13:45–?	2 miles (3.2 km)	100 yards (91 m)	This tornado followed a path that was similar to the one that occurred the previous month with the greatest damage inflicted to a church. Losses totaled $25,000.

=== April 27 event ===
List of known tornadoes – Thursday, April 27, 1950
F#	Location	County / Parish	State	Start coord.	Time (UTC)	Path length	Max. width	Summary
F1	Tarry Town	Berkeley	SC	33.07°N 80.0°W	22:00–?	0.7 miles (1.1 km)	37 yards (34 m)	Westward-moving tornado, embedded within a larger area of violent winds and hen-egg-sized or larger hail that fell for about 23 minutes, destroyed 12 homes and unroofed five others near Moncks Corner. Hail damaged plants while the winds damaged or destroyed a total of 17 structures. Losses totaled $25,000. Grazulis classified the tornado as an F2.

=== April 28 event ===
List of confirmed tornadoes – Friday, April 28, 1950 (Note: Prior to 1994, only the average widths of tornado paths were officially listed.)
F#	Location	County / Parish	State	Start coord.	Time (UTC)	Path length	Max. width	Summary
F3	Lugert to Cambridge to WNW of Sentinel	Kiowa, Washita	OK	34.88°N 99.28°W	20:17–20:51	20.8 miles (33.5 km)	400 yards (370 m)	1 death – This intense, multi-vortex tornado touched down at Lake Lugert and moved northeastward, before first turning north-northeastward and then north, passing east of Lone Wolf and through Cambridge while moving at 30 to 35 miles per hour (48 to 56 km/h). Five homes were destroyed, three others suffered major damage, and three more had minor damage and 17 families affected. The tornado struck 17 farmsteads in its path. There was one injury and $750,000 in damages. As many as three tornado columns were observed at one time and a CAA airways observer reported that the column turning counter-clockwise. Heavy rain accompanied by hail fell after the tornado had dissipated.
F1	NE of Gridley to Sharpe to SSW of Waverly	Coffey	KS	38.12°N 95.85°W	23:00–?	19.8 miles (31.9 km)	33 yards (30 m)	This was likely a tornado family as several funnel clouds and tornadoes were reported along the track of this tornado. It passed west of Burlington—where two small funnel clouds were seen—east of New Strawn, and through Sharpe while causing scattered damage along its path. Barns and other small buildings were damaged or destroyed and numerous trees were twisted out of the ground. There was $25,000 in damages.
F4	Northern Clyde	Callahan	TX	32.42°N 99.5°W	00:00–?	1.3 miles (2.1 km)	233 yards (213 m)	5 deaths – This short-lived but violent tornado moved north-northeastward through the north side of Clyde, obliterating everything in its path. 21 homes were destroyed or damaged. Nothing remained of two homes but debris scattered for more than 1 mi (1.6 km). A refrigerator lodged atop a telephone pole 1/2 mi (0.80 km) distant as well. Five people were injured and losses totaled $250,000. Hail that accompanied the storm damaged crops as well.
F4	Holdenville	Hughes	OK	35.08°N 96.4°W	01:05–?	4.5 miles (7.2 km)	200 yards (180 m)	5 deaths – This violent tornado began 2 mi (3.2 km) southwest of Holdenville at 7:05 pm CST and moved northeastward directly through the city. It cut a swath of destruction six blocks wide and 18 blocks long in the northwest section of Holdenville. A total of 38 homes were destroyed while 188 other homes were damaged. After exiting Holdenville, the tornado turned to the north and dissipated 1 mi (1.6 km) north of town. There were 32 injuries and $250,000 in damage. The NWS Norman puts the property losses in Holdenville at $500,000. Two of the dead were found 150 yd (140 m) from their homesite.
F2	NE of Coalgate to Cottonwood	Coal	OK	34.55°N 96.2°W	01:30–?	0.8 miles (1.3 km)	100 yards (91 m)	A short-lived but strong tornado struck Cottonwood 1.5 miles (2.4 km) northeast of Coalgate, destroying two homes, five barns, and a car. Damage was estimated at $25,000.

=== April 29 event ===
List of confirmed tornadoes – Saturday, April 29, 1950
F#	Location	County / Parish	State	Start coord.	Time (UTC)	Path length	Max. width	Summary
F2	Columbia to N of Improve	Marion	MS	31.27°N 89.83°W	18:00–20:00	11.3 miles (18.2 km)	100 yards (91 m)	A strong and very destructive tornado impacted Columbia and areas to the northeast, destroying six buildings and damaging 225 others. Losses totaled $250,000.
F1	Comanche to WSW of Newburg	Comanche	TX	31.9°N 98.6°W	21:30–?	11.5 miles (18.5 km)	200 yards (180 m)	This tornado, which was accompanied by large hail, moved southward through Comanche and into rural farmland, damaging ranches, dairy farms, some crops, and livestock. Although losses were estimated $25,000, the CDNS report states that the storm as a whole caused $62,400 in damage with hail doing about $600 of that.

== May ==
Confirmed tornadoes by Fujita rating
FU	F0	F1	F2	F3	F4	F5	Total
0	5	35	18	2	1	0	61

=== May 1 event ===
List of known tornadoes – Monday, May 1, 1950
F#	Location	County / Parish	State	Start coord.	Time (UTC)	Path length	Max. width	Summary
F1	N of Robeline	Natchitoches	LA	31.7°N 93.3°W	06:00–?	2 miles (3.2 km)	100 yards (91 m)	This tornado damaged or destroyed rural outbuildings on farms, homes, timberland, utility wires, and crops. Losses totaled $250,000.
F1	N of Fayette	Jefferson	MS	31.73°N 91.07°W	10:00	0.1 miles (0.16 km)	33 yd (30 m)	Caused $25,000 in damages.
F1	Eastern Natchez	Adams	MS	31.55°N 91.38°W	14:00	0.1 miles (0.16 km)	33 yd (30 m)	Caused $25,000 in damages.
F1	N of Winnfield	Winn	LA	31.95°N 92.63°W	15:30–?	15.4 miles (24.8 km)	150 yd (140 m)	Caused $250,000 in damages.
F2	E of Cloutierville	Natchitoches	LA	31.55°N 92.9°W	16:25-?	3.6 miles (5.8 km)	100 yd (91 m)	Seven people were injured and losses totaled $250,000.
F0	E of Georgetown	La Salle	LA	31.75°N 92.25°W	16:30	1 mile (1.6 km)	100 yd (91 m)	Caused $25,000 in damages.
F1	S of Monterey	Concordia	LA	31.38°N 91.73°W	16:30	1 mile (1.6 km)	100 yd (91 m)	Two people were injured and losses totaled $25,000.

=== May 2 event ===
List of known tornadoes – Tuesday, May 2, 1950
F#	Location	County / Parish	State	Start coord.	Time (UTC)	Path length	Max. width	Summary
F1	NW of Montgomery to S of Sikes	Grant, Winn	LA	31.67°N 92.9°W	07:00-?	32.8 miles (52.8 km)	150 yd (140 m)	One person was injured and losses totaled $500,000.
F2	SW of Jonesville	Catahoula	LA	31.55°N 91.97°W	08:00	2 miles (3.2 km)	100 yd (91 m)	1 death – Five people were injured and losses totaled $250,000.

=== May 4 event ===
List of known tornadoes – Thursday, May 4, 1950
F#	Location	County / Parish	State	Start coord.	Time (UTC)	Path length	Max. width	Summary
F1	N of Liebenthal	Rush	KS	38.68°N 99.32°W	01:00	0.1 miles (0.16 km)	33 yd (30 m)	Caused $25,000 in damages.
F2	Perryton	Ochiltree	TX	36.4°N 100.8°W	01:30-?	1.9 miles (3.1 km)	50 yd (46 m)	1 death – Strong tornado cut a half-block wide directly through Perryton caused major damage as it moved. Several houses and a large warehouse were destroyed. One man was killed as he hurried his family to shelter. There were also 13 injuries and $250,000 in damages.
F1	SE of Pacific Junction	Mills	IA	40.95°N 95.73°W	02:00	0.1 miles (0.16 km)	33 yd (30 m)	
F2	NW of Carter to SW of Elk City	Beckham	OK	35.25°N 99.55°W	02:30-?	5.6 miles (9.0 km)	293 yd (268 m)	Caused $25,000 in damages.
F1	NE of Foss State Park	Custer	OK	35.58°N 99.17°W	02:30	0.1 miles (0.16 km)	33 yd (30 m)	Caused $2,500 in damages.
F2	Fort Supply	Woodward	OK	36.57°N 99.57°W	02:45	1 mile (1.6 km)	100 yd (91 m)	Caused $250,000 in damages.
F4	Zook to Dundee to W of Great Bend	Pawnee, Barton	KS	38.03°N 99.12°W	04:10-?	34.3 miles (55.2 km)	150 yd (140 m)	Large, long-tracked, violent tornado touched down and struck the town of Zook, destroying 11 homes, including two that incurred near-F5 damage. A housing development northwest of Great Bend was also hit. There was one injury and $500,000 in damages.

=== May 5 event ===
List of known tornadoes – Friday, May 5, 1950
F#	Location	County / Parish	State	Start coord.	Time (UTC)	Path length	Max. width	Summary
F3	N of Whiting to Hiawatha	Jackson, Brown	KS	39.62°N 95.62°W	08:30	17.3 miles (27.8 km)	440 yards (400 m)	Large, intense tornado moved through rural areas before striking Hiawatha, injuring 12 and causing $500,000 in damages.

=== May 7 event ===
List of known tornadoes – Sunday, May 7, 1950
F#	Location	County / Parish	State	Start coord.	Time (UTC)	Path length	Max. width	Summary
F1	SW of Gage	Ellis	OK	36.3°N 99.8°W	23:30	0.1 miles (0.16 km)	33 yd (30 m)	
F2	ENE of Hennessey	Kingfisher, Garfield	OK	36.12°N 97.83°W	04:00-?	4.3 miles (6.9 km)	33 yd (30 m)	Caused $25,000 in damages and three injuries.
F1	NE of Perkins	Payne	OK	36.0°N 97.0°W	04:00	0.1 miles (0.16 km)	33 yd (30 m)	Caused $2,500 in damages.

=== May 8 event ===
List of known tornadoes – Monday, May 8, 1950
F#	Location	County / Parish	State	Start coord.	Time (UTC)	Path length	Max. width	Summary
F1	SE of Parkston	Hutchinson	SD	43.38°N 97.97°W	09:30	1 mile (1.6 km)	33 yd (30 m)	Caused $2,500 in damages.
F1	De Leon Springs	Volusia	FL	29.13°N 81.35°W	18:00	0.3 miles (0.48 km)	30 yd (27 m)	Caused $2,500 in damages.
F2	NW of Tipton to S of Glen Elder	Mitchell	KS	39.35°N 98.48°W	23:30-?	12.6 miles (20.3 km)	660 yd (600 m)	Caused $250,000 in damages.
F2	N of Glen Elder to SW of Jewell	Jewell	KS	39.57°N 98.3°W	00:00-?	6.8 miles (10.9 km)	33 yd (30 m)	One person was injured and losses totaled $25,000.
F2	Red Oak	Montgomery	IA	41.03°N 95.27°W	00:20-?	2 miles (3.2 km)	200 yd (180 m)	
F2	NE of Natoma to W of Hunter	Osborne	KS	39.23°N 98.95°W	00:30-?	19.6 miles (31.5 km)	440 yd (400 m)	Caused $25,000 in damages and two injuries.
F1	S of Concordia	Cloud	KS	39.4°N 97.65°W	02:17	0.1 miles (0.16 km)	33 yd (30 m)	Caused $25,000 in damages and one injury.
F1	N of Norway	Republic	KS	39.72°N 97.77°W	02:30	0.1 miles (0.16 km)	33 yd (30 m)	
F2	E of Auburn to N of Shubert	Nemaha	NE	40.38°N 95.8°W	03:10-?	8.8 miles (14.2 km)	467 yd (427 m)	Caused $25,000 in damages and one injury.

=== May 9 event ===
List of known tornadoes – Tuesday, May 9, 1950
F#	Location	County / Parish	State	Start coord.	Time (UTC)	Path length	Max. width	Summary
F1	Manhattan	Riley	KS	39.2°N 96.58°W	05:01	0.1 miles (0.16 km)	33 yd (30 m)	Caused $25,000 in damages.
F1	ESE of Straford	Pontotoc	OK	34.77°N 96.83°W	03:20	0.8 miles (1.3 km)	200 yd (180 m)	Caused $25,000 in damages.

=== May 10 event ===
List of known tornadoes – Wednesday, May 10, 1950
F#	Location	County / Parish	State	Start coord.	Time (UTC)	Path length	Max. width	Summary
F2	SW of Mountain View	Uinta	WY	41.18°N 110.42°W	18:00	2 miles (3.2 km)	33 yd (30 m)	Caused $30 in property damage.

=== May 11 event ===
List of known tornadoes – Thursday, May 11, 1950
EF#	Location	County / Parish	State	Start Coord.	Time (UTC)	Path length	Max width	Summary
F1	Beaver	Beaver	OK	36.82°N 100.52°W	23:30	0.5 mi (0.80 km)	77 yd (70 m)	Caused $250 in property damage.

=== May 12 event ===
List of known tornadoes – Friday, May 12, 1950
EF#	Location	County / Parish	State	Start Coord.	Time (UTC)	Path length	Max width	Summary
F1	SSW of Bethel	Pitt	NC	35.75°N 77.42°W	19:00	2 mi (3.2 km)	33 yd (30 m)	Caused $25,000 in property damage.
F0	SW of Wendell	Wake	NC	35.73°N 78.40°W	22:00	1 mi (1.6 km)	200 yd (180 m)	
F1	SW of Wendell	Wake	NC	35.73°N 78.40°W	22:00	1 mi (1.6 km)	200 yd (180 m)	

=== May 13 event ===
List of known tornadoes – Tuesday, May 13, 1950
EF#	Location	County / Parish	State	Start Coord.	Time (UTC)	Path length	Max width	Summary
F1	ENE of Marksville	Avoyelles	LA	31.15°N 91.95°W	16:30	2 mi (3.2 km)	27 yd (25 m)	Caused $25,000 in property damage.

=== May 14 event ===
List of known tornadoes – Sunday, May 14, 1950
EF#	Location	County / Parish	State	Start Coord.	Time (UTC)	Path length	Max width	Summary
F1	Fresno	Fort Bend	TX	29.53°N 95.45°W	22:00	1 mi (1.6 km)	100 yd (91 m)	Caused $2,500 in property damage.
F1	W of Candor to SSE of Biscoe	Montgomery	NC	35.30°N 79.80°W	22:00	3.8 mi (6.1 km)	50 yd (46 m)	Caused $2,500 in property damage.
F2	Wesley Chapel	Union	NC	35.00°N 80.68°W	22:30	2 mi (3.2 km)	33 yd (30 m)	Injured 5 people.

=== May 15 event ===
List of known tornadoes – Monday, May 15, 1950
EF#	Location	County / Parish	State	Start Coord.	Time (UTC)	Path length	Max width	Summary
F2	W of Boerne to Camp Bullis	Kendall, Bexar	TX	29.78°N 98.83°W	05:01-?	18 mi (29 km)	33 yd (30 m)	Caused $25,000 in property damages.
F2	E of Holden Heights	Orange	FL	28.50°N 81.37°W	16:00	0.1 mi (0.16 km)	33 yd (30 m)	Caused $25,000 in property damages.
F1	Northern Orlando	Orange	FL	28.58°N 81.37°W	16:00	0.1 mi (0.16 km)	33 yd (30 m)	Caused $25,000 in property damages.

=== May 16 event ===
List of known tornadoes – Tuesday, May 16, 1950
EF#	Location	County / Parish	State	Start Coord.	Time (UTC)	Path length	Max width	Summary
F2	S of Cunningham	Kingman	KS	37.55°N 98.42°W	23:00	0.2 mi (0.32 km)	200 yd (180 m)	Caused $2,500 in property damages.
F1	W of Putnam	Dewey	OK	35.82°N 99.12°W	00:30-?	7.3 mi (11.7 km)	100 yd (91 m)	Caused $2,500 in property damages and injured one person.

=== May 18 event ===
List of known tornadoes – Thursday, May 18, 1950
EF#	Location	County / Parish	State	Start Coord.	Time (UTC)	Path length	Max width	Summary
F1	Northern McCook	Red Willow	NE	40.22°N 100.63°W	20:15	0.7 mi (1.1 km)	333 yd (304 m)	Caused $25,000 in property damages.
F0	S of Burr Oak	Jewell	KS	39.85°N 98.30°W	00:00	0.1 mi (0.16 km)	33 yd (30 m)	Caused $2,500 in property damages.
F3	Cedar Point	Chase	KS	38.12°N 96.82°W	00:00-?	14.9 mi (24.0 km)	100 yd (91 m)	Caused $250,000 in property damages and injured two people.

=== May 19 event ===
List of known tornadoes – Friday, May 19, 1950
EF#	Location	County / Parish	State	Start Coord.	Time (UTC)	Path length	Max width	Summary
F0	El Dorado	Butler	KS	37.82°N 96.85°W	06:30	0.1 mi (0.16 km)	33 yd (30 m)	Caused $2,500 in property damages.

=== May 22 event ===
List of known tornadoes – Monday, May 22, 1950
EF#	Location	County / Parish	State	Start Coord.	Time (UTC)	Path length	Max width	Summary
F1	NW of Butler	Custer	OK	35.67°N 99.23°W	17:39-?	1.5 mi (2.4 km)	100 yd (91 m)	

=== May 23 event ===
List of known tornadoes – Tuesday, May 23, 1950
EF#	Location	County / Parish	State	Start Coord.	Time (UTC)	Path length	Max width	Summary
F0	Phillipsburg	Phillips	KS	39.75°N 99.32°W	23:00	.2 mi (0.32 km)	250 yd (230 m)	Caused $25,000 in property damages.

=== May 24 event ===
List of known tornadoes – Wednesday, May 24, 1950
EF#	Location	County / Parish	State	Start Coord.	Time (UTC)	Path length	Max width	Summary
F2	N of Protection to WNW of Coldwater	Comanche	KS	37.27°N 99.42°W	18:30-?	3.6 mi (5.8 km)	77 yd (70 m)	Caused $2,500 in property damages and injured one person.
F1	SE of Green to NW of Randolph	Clay, Riley	KS	39.38°N 96.97°W	22:30-?	10.7 mi (17.2 km)	40 yd (37 m)	Caused $25,000 in property damages.
F2	E of Mooreland	Woodward	OK	36.45°N 99.03°W	02:30	1 mi (1.6 km)	33 yd (30 m)	Caused $25,000 in property damages and injured two people.

=== May 25 event ===
List of known tornadoes – Thursday, May 25, 1950
EF#	Location	County / Parish	State	Start Coord.	Time (UTC)	Path length	Max width	Summary
F1	SE of Lamesa	Dawson	TX	32.67°N 101.88°W	21:30-?	3 mi (4.8 km)	880 yd (800 m)	Caused $2,500 in property damages.

=== May 29 event ===
List of known tornadoes – Monday, May 29, 1950
EF#	Location	County / Parish	State	Start Coord.	Time (UTC)	Path length	Max width	Summary
F1	S of Adair	Mayes	OK	36.38°N 95.27°W	19:48	1 mi (1.6 km)	33 yd (30 m)	Caused $250 in property damages.
F1	E of Aubrey to SE of Pilot Point	Denton	TX	33.35°N 96.92°W	22:00-?	3.4 mi (5.5 km)	267 yd (244 m)	
F1	E of Longstreet	DeSoto	LA	32.10°N 93.90°W	04:00	1 mi (1.6 km)	27 yd (25 m)	Caused $25,000 in property damages and injured thirteen people.
F1	SW of Noble	Sabine	LA	31.67°N 93.70°W	04:00	1 mi (1.6 km)	27 yd (25 m)	Caused $25,000 in property damages.

=== May 30 event ===
List of known tornadoes – Tuesday, May 30, 1950
EF#	Location	County / Parish	State	Start Coord.	Time (UTC)	Path length	Max width	Summary
F1	Eastern Dalton	Whitfield	GA	34.75°N 84.29°W	19:00	.5 mi (0.80 km)	7 yd (6.4 m)	Caused $2,500 in property damages.

=== May 31 event ===
List of known tornadoes – Wednesday, May 31, 1950
EF#	Location	County / Parish	State	Start Coord.	Time (UTC)	Path length	Max width	Summary
F1	E of Ayden	Pitt	NC	35.44°N 77.25°W	20:30	0.1 mi (0.16 km)	33 yd (30 m)	Caused $2,500 in property damages.

== June ==
Confirmed tornadoes by Fujita rating
FU	F0	F1	F2	F3	F4	F5	Total
0	5	11	4	6	2	0	28

=== June 3 event ===
List of confirmed tornadoes – Saturday, June 3, 1950 (Note: All dates are based on the local time zone where the tornado touched down; however, all times are in Coordinated Universal Time for consistency.)
EF#	Location	County / Parish	State	Start Coord.	Time (UTC)	Path length	Max width	Summary
F3	N of Kosciusko	Attala	MS	33.08°N 89.58°W	06:00	2 mi (3.2 km)	50 yd (46 m)	2 deaths - Caused one injury.

=== June 4 event ===
List of confirmed tornadoes – Sunday, June 4, 1950
EF#	Location	County / Parish	State	Start Coord.	Time (UTC)	Path length	Max width	Summary
F0	S of Villa Rica	Carroll	GA	33.68°N 84.93°W	12:00	2 mi (3.2 km)	200 yd (180 m)	Caused $2,500 in property damages.
F1	Tucker	DeKalb	GA	33.85°N 84.25°W	13:00-?	3.3 mi (5.3 km)	7 yd (6.4 m)	Caused $25,000 in property damages and injured one person.

=== June 5 event ===
List of confirmed tornadoes – Monday, June 5, 1950
EF#	Location	County / Parish	State	Start Coord.	Time (UTC)	Path length	Max width	Summary
F3	Brenham to S of Pine Island	Washington, Austin, Waller	TX	30.18°N 96.40°W	20:55-?	23.9 mi (38.5 km)	67 yd (61 m)	Caused $250,000 in property damages and injured six people.
F1	E of New Ulm to SE of Sealy	Austin	TX	29.90°N 96.40°W	21:00-?	23.7 mi (38.1 km)	33 yd (30 m)	Caused $2,500,000 in property damage and injured two people.

=== June 7 event ===
List of confirmed tornadoes – Wednesday, June 7, 1950
EF#	Location	County / Parish	State	Start Coord.	Time (UTC)	Path length	Max width	Summary
F1	NE of Lance Creek	Niobrara	WY	43.08°N 104.50°W	20:30	0.2 mi (0.32 km)	10 yd (9.1 m)	Caused $30 in property damages.
F1	S of Barnesville	Lamar	GA	33.03°N 84.15°W	22:30	2 mi (3.2 km)	300 yd (270 m)	Caused $2,500 in property damages.

=== June 8 event ===
List of confirmed tornadoes – Thursday, June 8, 1950
EF#	Location	County / Parish	State	Start Coord.	Time (UTC)	Path length	Max width	Summary
F4	SW of Windom to SE of McPherson	Rice, McPherson	KS	38.33°N 97.93°W	01:10-?	17.1 mi (27.5 km)	700 yd (640 m)	1 death - Caused $250,000 in property damages and five injuries.

=== June 9 event ===
List of confirmed tornadoes – Friday, June 9, 1950
EF#	Location	County / Parish	State	Start Coord.	Time (UTC)	Path length	Max width	Summary
F1	NE of Crocker to WNW of Dixon	Pulaski, Maries	MO	38.00°N 92.22°W	18:00-?	2.7 mi (4.3 km)	220 yd (200 m)	Caused $2,500 in property damages.
F1	E of Blackwell	Kay	OK	36.80°N 97.25°W	23:25	0.1 mi (0.16 km)	100 yd (91 m)	Caused $2,500 in property damages.

=== June 13 event ===
List of confirmed tornadoes – Tuesday, June 13, 1950
EF#	Location	County / Parish	State	Start Coord.	Time (UTC)	Path length	Max width	Summary
F1	S of Milledgeville	Carroll	IL	41.95°N 89.77°W	08:00	0.1 mi (0.16 km)	33 yd (30 m)	Caused $25,000 in property damages.
F3	NW of Fingal	Barnes	ND	46.80°N 97.92°W	16:05	2 mi (3.2 km)	33 yd (30 m)	Caused $250,000 in property damages.
F2	Center	Knox	NE	42.60°N 97.88°W	22:30	4.1 mi (6.6 km)	33 yd (30 m)	Caused $25,000 in property damages and one hundred and one injuries.

=== June 14 event ===
List of confirmed tornadoes – Wednesday, June 14, 1950
EF#	Location	County / Parish	State	Start Coord.	Time (UTC)	Path length	Max width	Summary
F1	NW of Four Corners	Weston	WY	44.13°N 104.18°W	21:00	0.2 mi (0.32 km)	10 yd (9.1 m)	Caused $30 in property damages.
F3	N of Fortuna to S of Crosby	Divide	ND	48.92°N 103.77°W	22:00	23.7 mi (38.1 km)	33 yd (30 m)	Caused $25,000 in property damages.

=== June 15 event ===
List of confirmed tornadoes – Thursday, June 15, 1950
EF#	Location	County / Parish	State	Start Coord.	Time (UTC)	Path length	Max width	Summary
F1	W of Shelbina	Shelby	MO	39.70°N 92.07°W	06:00	0.2 mi (0.32 km)	100 yd (91 m)	Caused $2,500 in property damages.
F2	NW of Rothsay to SE of Barnesville	Wilkin	MN	46.58°N 96.33°W	21:42-?	4.6 mi (7.4 km)	67 yd (61 m)	Caused $2,500 in property damages and injured four people.
F3	S of Ames to S of Nevada	Story	IA	41.98°N 93.60°W	01:00-?	5.6 mi (9.0 km)	300 yd (270 m)	Caused five injuries.

=== June 16 event ===
List of confirmed tornadoes – Friday, June 16, 1950
EF#	Location	County / Parish	State	Start Coord.	Time (UTC)	Path length	Max width	Summary
F1	S of Leoti to Marienthal to S of Russell Springs	Wichita	KS	38.28°N 101.28°W	20:30-?	29.9 mi (48.1 km)	33 yd (30 m)	Caused $25,000 in property damages.

=== June 19 event ===
List of confirmed tornadoes – Monday, June 19, 1950
EF#	Location	County / Parish	State	Start Coord.	Time (UTC)	Path length	Max width	Summary
F0	Northern Dalhart to NW of Cactus	Dallam	TX	36.08°N 102.53°W	01:40-?	15.8 mi (25.4 km)	167 yd (153 m)	

=== June 22 event ===
List of confirmed tornadoes – Thursday, June 22, 1950
EF#	Location	County / Parish	State	Start Coord.	Time (UTC)	Path length	Max width	Summary
F0	SE of Nelson to N of Nora	Nuckolls	NE	40.18°N 98.03°W	02:00-?	1.9 mi (3.1 km)	33 yd (30 m)	

=== June 25 event ===
List of confirmed tornadoes – Sunday, June 25, 1950
EF#	Location	County / Parish	State	Start Coord.	Time (UTC)	Path length	Max width	Summary
F0	Maize	Sedgwick	KS	37.77°N 97.47°W	23:45	0.1 mi (0.16 km)	33 yd (30 m)	Caused $2,500 in property damages.
F1	SE of Ladysmith	Rusk	WI	45.42°N 91.00°W	00:20	0.5 mi (0.80 km)	33 yd (30 m)	Caused $25,000 in property damages.
F2	N of Prentice to N of Brantwood	Price	WI	45.57°N 90.30°W	01:30-?	8.4 mi (13.5 km)	33 yd (30 m)	Caused $250,000 in property damages.
F2	SW of Unity to Colby to NE of Abbotsford	Clark, Marathon	WI	44.83°N 90.35°W	02:00-?	7.8 mi (12.6 km)	33 yd (30 m)	1 death - Caused $25,000 in property damages.
F0	NNE of Bogue	Graham	KS	39.50°N 99.62°W	02:00	0.1 mi (0.16 km)	33 yd (30 m)	Caused $2,500 in property damages.
F4	SW of Woodboro to Rhinelander	Oneida	WI	45.58°N 89.58°W	02:00-?	13.1 mi (21.1 km)	880 yd (800 m)	2 deaths - Caused $250,000 in property damages and twelve injuries.
F3	Southeastern Berlin	Green Lake	WI	43.95°N 88.95°W	04:30-?	1.7 mi (2.7 km)	300 yd (270 m)	Caused $250,000 in property damages.

== July ==
Confirmed tornadoes by Fujita rating
FU	F0	F1	F2	F3	F4	F5	Total
0	3	9	9	1	1	0	23

=== July 1 event ===
List of confirmed tornadoes – Saturday, July 1, 1950
EF#	Location	County / Parish	State	Start Coord.	Time (UTC)	Path length	Max width	Summary
F1	Northern Fort Riley	Riley	KS	39.30°N 96.92°W	17:00	0.1 mi (0.16 km)	33 yd (30 m)	Caused $25,000 in property damages and one injury.
F2	N of Hope	Dickinson	KS	38.70°N 97.08°W	17:00	0.1 mi (0.16 km)	33 yd (30 m)	Caused $25,000 in property damages.
F2	Southern Independence	Buchanan	IA	42.45°N 91.92°W	01:00-?	14 mi (23 km)	33 yd (30 m)	

=== July 2 event ===
List of confirmed tornadoes – Sunday, July 2, 1950
EF#	Location	County / Parish	State	Start Coord.	Time (UTC)	Path length	Max width	Summary
F2	Scott City	Scott	KS	38.47°N 100.88°W	00:00	1 mi (1.6 km)	90 yd (82 m)	Caused $2,500,000 in property damages.

=== July 3 event ===
List of confirmed tornadoes – Monday, July 3, 1950
EF#	Location	County / Parish	State	Start Coord.	Time (UTC)	Path length	Max width	Summary
F0	Southwestern South Bend	St. Joseph	IN	41.65°N 86.30°W	22:20	0.1 mi (0.16 km)	33 yd (30 m)	

=== July 5 event ===
List of confirmed tornadoes – Wednesday, July 5, 1950
EF#	Location	County / Parish	State	Start Coord.	Time (UTC)	Path length	Max width	Summary
F2	W of Fogelsville to Catasauqua	Lehigh	PA	40.58°N 75.70°W	22:00-?	12.9 mi (20.8 km)	33 yd (30 m)	Caused $25,000 in property damages and two injuries.
F2	W of Gratz	Dauphin	PA	40.60°N 76.75°W	22:30	0.1 mi (0.16 km)	13 yd (12 m)	Caused $2,500 in property damages.

=== July 8 event ===
List of confirmed tornadoes – Saturday, July 8, 1950
EF#	Location	County / Parish	State	Start Coord.	Time (UTC)	Path length	Max width	Summary
F1	S of Bemen	Marshall	KS	39.82°N 96.80°W	03:45	1 mi (1.6 km)	90 yd (82 m)	Caused $25,000 in property damages.

=== July 11 event ===
List of confirmed tornadoes – Tuesday, July 11, 1950
EF#	Location	County / Parish	State	Start Coord.	Time (UTC)	Path length	Max width	Summary
F1	SW of Logan	Quay	NM	35.28°N 103.52°W	23:00-?	3.8 mi (6.1 km)	500 yd (460 m)	Caused $250 in property damages.

=== July 12 event ===
List of confirmed tornadoes – Wednesday, July 12, 1950
EF#	Location	County / Parish	State	Start Coord.	Time (UTC)	Path length	Max width	Summary
F2	NW of Cobalt	Middlesex	CT	41.57°N 72.57°W	20:00	10 mi (16 km)	33 yd (30 m)	Caused $2,500 in property damages.

=== July 14 event ===
List of confirmed tornadoes – Friday, July 14, 1950
EF#	Location	County / Parish	State	Start Coord.	Time (UTC)	Path length	Max width	Summary
F2	Ridgefield	Fairfield	CT	41.27°N 73.50°W	10:30	5 mi (8.0 km)	100 yd (91 m)	Caused $250,000 in property damages and three injuries.

=== July 15 event ===
List of confirmed tornadoes – Saturday, July 15, 1950
EF#	Location	County / Parish	State	Start Coord.	Time (UTC)	Path length	Max width	Summary
F4	SE of West Point to E of Uehling	Cuming, Burt, Dodge	NE	41.80°N 96.60°W	22:30-?	10 mi (16 km)	440 yd (400 m)	Caused $2,500,000 in property damages and thirty-three injuries.

=== July 16 event ===
List of confirmed tornadoes – Sunday, July 16, 1950
EF#	Location	County / Parish	State	Start Coord.	Time (UTC)	Path length	Max width	Summary
F1	Southern Dwight	Livingston	IL	41.08°N 88.43°W	03:15	1 mi (1.6 km)	33 yd (30 m)	Caused $25,000 in property damages.

=== July 18 event ===
List of confirmed tornadoes – Tuesday, July 18, 1950
EF#	Location	County / Parish	State	Start Coord.	Time (UTC)	Path length	Max width	Summary
F1	W of Chanute	Allen	KS	37.68°N 95.52°W	21:30	0.1 mi (0.16 km)	33 yd (30 m)	

=== July 19 event ===
List of confirmed tornadoes – Wednesday, July 19, 1950
EF#	Location	County / Parish	State	Start Coord.	Time (UTC)	Path length	Max width	Summary
F1	N of Newtown to N of Wingate	Fountain, Montgomery	IN	40.22°N 87.15°W	19:30-?	4.3 mi (6.9 km)	200 yd (180 m)	Caused $25,000 in property damages.
F2	N of Ohio City to S of Van Wert	Van Wert	OH	40.80°N 84.62°W	20:15-?	0.1 mi (0.16 km)	200 yd (180 m)	
F3	Eastern Lima to Beaverdam	Allen	OH	40.72°N 84.08°W	20:15-?	9.7 mi (15.6 km)	300 yd (270 m)	Caused $2,500,000 in property damages and thirty injuries.
F1	ESE of Versailles	Morgan	MO	38.42°N 92.77°W	21:00	1.5 mi (2.4 km)	440 yd (400 m)	Caused $250 in property damages.
F2	Fort Wayne	Allen	IN	41.07°N 85.08°W	22:45-?	1.1 mi (1.8 km)	100 yd (91 m)	

=== July 22 event ===
List of confirmed tornadoes – Saturday, July 22, 1950
EF#	Location	County / Parish	State	Start Coord.	Time (UTC)	Path length	Max width	Summary
F0	E of Galeton	Weld	CO	40.52°N 104.57°W	20:07	0.1 mi (0.16 km)	33 yd (30 m)	

=== July 24 event ===
List of confirmed tornadoes – Monday, July 24, 1950
EF#	Location	County / Parish	State	Start Coord.	Time (UTC)	Path length	Max width	Summary
F0	Titusville	Crawford	PA	41.63°N 79.68°W	19:40	0.1 mi (0.16 km)	33 yd (30 m)	Caused $2,500 in property damages.

=== July 26 event ===
List of confirmed tornadoes – Wednesday, July 26, 1950
EF#	Location	County / Parish	State	Start Coord.	Time (UTC)	Path length	Max width	Summary
F1	Winterville	Pitt	NC	35.53°N 77.40°W	20:30	0.1 mi (0.16 km)	33 yd (30 m)	

=== July 27 event ===
List of confirmed tornadoes – Thursday, July 27, 1950
EF#	Location	County / Parish	State	Start Coord.	Time (UTC)	Path length	Max width	Summary
F1	Concord	Cabarrus	NC	35.40°N 80.57°W	21:20	0.1 mi (0.16 km)	33 yd (30 m)	Caused $2,500 in property damages.

== August ==
Confirmed tornadoes by Fujita rating
FU	F0	F1	F2	F3	F4	F5	Total
0	1	8	4	0	0	0	13

=== August 2 event ===
List of confirmed tornadoes – Wednesday, August 2, 1950
EF#	Location	County / Parish	State	Start Coord.	Time (UTC)	Path length	Max width	Summary
F1	Magdalena	Socorro	NM	34.02°N 107.30°W	17:30-?	7.9 mi (12.7 km)	100 yd (91 m)	Caused $25,000 in property damages.

=== August 5 event ===
List of confirmed tornadoes – Saturday, August 5, 1950
EF#	Location	County / Parish	State	Start Coord.	Time (UTC)	Path length	Max width	Summary
F2	NE of Haxtun	Sedgwick	CO	40.73°N 102.55°W	23:30	0.1 mi (0.16 km)	33 yd (30 m)	Caused $25,000 in property damages and injured one person.
F2	N of Paoli	Sedgwick	CO	40.73°N 102.55°W	23:35	0.1 mi (0.16 km)	33 yd (30 m)	Caused $25,000 in property damages.

=== August 6 event ===
List of confirmed tornadoes – Sunday, August 6, 1950
EF#	Location	County / Parish	State	Start Coord.	Time (UTC)	Path length	Max width	Summary
F1	NNW of Ludell	Rawlins	KS	39.93°N 101.00°W	20:00	0.1 mi (0.16 km)	33 yd (30 m)	Caused $25,000 in property damages.
F2	E of Garden City	Finney	KS	37.97°N 100.77°W	23:00	0.1 mi (0.16 km)	33 yd (30 m)	Caused $2,500 in property damages.
F2	Grinnell to N of Grainfield	Gove	KS	39.12°N 100.47°W	23:30-?	8.7 mi (14.0 km)	33 yd (30 m)	Caused $250,000 in property damages.

=== August 8 event ===
List of confirmed tornadoes – Tuesday, August 8, 1950
EF#	Location	County / Parish	State	Start Coord.	Time (UTC)	Path length	Max width	Summary
F1	NW of Battlefield	Greene	MO	37.13°N 93.38°W	06:00	2 mi (3.2 km)	10 yd (9.1 m)	Caused $250 in property damages.

=== August 9 event ===
List of confirmed tornadoes – Wednesday, August 9, 1950
EF#	Location	County / Parish	State	Start Coord.	Time (UTC)	Path length	Max width	Summary
F1	S of Waverly	Wood	WV	39.28°N 81.38°W	21:55	5 mi (8.0 km)	33 yd (30 m)	

=== August 11 event ===
List of confirmed tornadoes – Friday, August 11, 1950
EF#	Location	County / Parish	State	Start Coord.	Time (UTC)	Path length	Max width	Summary
F1	SE of Galena	Kent	MD	39.33°N 75.87°W	22:00	6 mi (9.7 km)	33 yd (30 m)	Caused $2,500 in property damages.

=== August 24 event ===
List of confirmed tornadoes – Thursday, August 24, 1950
EF#	Location	County / Parish	State	Start Coord.	Time (UTC)	Path length	Max width	Summary
F2	Northwestern Almyra	Arkansas	AR	34.40°N 91.43°W	08:45-?	3.6 mi (5.8 km)	200 yd (180 m)	Caused $25,000 in property damages and seven injuries.

=== August 28 event ===
List of confirmed tornadoes – Monday, August 28, 1950
EF#	Location	County / Parish	State	Start Coord.	Time (UTC)	Path length	Max width	Summary
F1	SE of Sublette	Haskell	KS	37.47°N 100.82°W	19:50-?	7.2 mi (11.6 km)	33 yd (30 m)	

=== August 29 event ===
List of confirmed tornadoes – Tuesday, August 29, 1950
EF#	Location	County / Parish	State	Start Coord.	Time (UTC)	Path length	Max width	Summary
F1	Northampton	Bucks	PA	40.22°N 75.00°W	21:00	1 mi (1.6 km)	33 yd (30 m)	Caused $2,500 in property damages.

=== August 30 event ===
List of confirmed tornadoes – Wednesday, August 30, 1950
EF#	Location	County / Parish	State	Start Coord.	Time (UTC)	Path length	Max width	Summary
F1	Apalachicola	Franklin	FL	29.73°N 84.98°W	21:00	0.5 mi (0.80 km)	50 yd (46 m)	Caused $25,000 in property damages.

=== August 31 event ===
List of confirmed tornadoes – Thursday, August 31, 1950
EF#	Location	County / Parish	State	Start Coord.	Time (UTC)	Path length	Max width	Summary
F0	NE of Marianna	Jackson	FL	30.80°N 85.20°W	05:02	0.1 mi (0.16 km)	33 yd (30 m)	Caused $2,500 in property damages.

== September ==
Confirmed tornadoes by Fujita rating
FU	F0	F1	F2	F3	F4	F5	Total
0	1	1	1	0	0	0	3

=== September 15 event ===
List of confirmed tornadoes – Friday, September 15, 1950
EF#	Location	County / Parish	State	Start Coord.	Time (UTC)	Path length	Max width	Summary
F2	N of Calvin to SW of Lamar	Hughes	OK	35.00°N 96.25°W	22:45-?	6.8 mi (10.9 km)	100 yd (91 m)	Caused $250,000 in property damages and injured six people.

=== September 16 event ===
List of confirmed tornadoes – Saturday, September 16, 1950
EF#	Location	County / Parish	State	Start Coord.	Time (UTC)	Path length	Max width	Summary
F0	W of Savanna	Pittsburg	OK	34.83°N 95.85°W	06:30	0.1 mi (0.16 km)	33 yd (30 m)	Caused $250 in property damage.

=== September 21 event ===
List of confirmed tornadoes – Thursday, September 21, 1950
EF#	Location	County / Parish	State	Start Coord.	Time (UTC)	Path length	Max width	Summary
F1	SE of Denton to southern Lincoln to NNE of Palmyra	Lancaster, Otoe	NE	40.72°N 96.82°W	22:30-?	22.5 mi (36.2 km)	67 yd (61 m)	Caused $2,500 in property damage.

== October ==
Confirmed tornadoes by Fujita rating
FU	F0	F1	F2	F3	F4	F5	Total
0	0	1	0	1	0	0	2

=== October 1 event ===
List of confirmed tornadoes – Sunday, October 1, 1950
EF#	Location	County / Parish	State	Start Coord.	Time (UTC)	Path length	Max width	Summary
F1	Boise City to NW of Keyes	Cimarron	OK	36.73°N 102.52°W	03:00-?	15.8 mi (25.4 km)	33 yd (30 m)	Caused $25,000 in property damages.

=== October 9 event ===
List of confirmed tornadoes – Monday, October 9, 1950
EF#	Location	County / Parish	State	Start Coord.	Time (UTC)	Path length	Max width	Summary
F3	NE of Nakina	Columbus	NC	34.17°N 78.60°W	08:15	2 mi (3.2 km)	880 yd (800 m)	Caused $250,000 in property damages and injured three people.

== November ==
Confirmed tornadoes by Fujita rating
FU	F0	F1	F2	F3	F4	F5	Total
0	0	2	1	1	0	0	4

=== November 4 event ===
List of confirmed tornadoes – Saturday, November 4, 1950
EF#	Location	County / Parish	State	Start Coord.	Time (UTC)	Path length	Max width	Summary
F3	S of Denver to Sinking Spring to Temple	Lancaster, Berks	PA	40.27°N 76.07°W	23:30-?	15.9 mi (25.6 km)	100 yd (91 m)	Caused $500,000 in property damages and one injury.

=== November 20 event ===
List of confirmed tornadoes – Monday, November 20, 1950
EF#	Location	County / Parish	State	Start Coord.	Time (UTC)	Path length	Max width	Summary
F2	ENE of Bremen	Muhlenberg	KY	37.37°N 87.20°W	08:20	0.1 mi (0.16 km)	33 yd (30 m)	Caused $250,000 in property damages.
F1	E of Georgetown	Scott	KY	38.20°N 84.50°W	10:00	0.1 mi (0.16 km)	33 yd (30 m)	Caused $250,000 in property damages.
F1	SW of Decatur	Newton	MS	32.42°N 89.13°W	13:30	2 mi (3.2 km)	37 yd (34 m)	Caused $25,000 in property damages.

== December ==
Confirmed tornadoes by Fujita rating
FU	F0	F1	F2	F3	F4	F5	Total
0	0	1	1	2	0	0	4

=== December 2 event ===
List of confirmed tornadoes – Saturday, December 2, 1950
EF#	Location	County / Parish	State	Start Coord.	Time (UTC)	Path length	Max width	Summary
F2	WSW of Dorsey to Mount Olive	Madison, Macoupin	IL	38.97°N 90.05°W	21:00-?	18.8 mi (30.3 km)	50 yd (46 m)	1 death - Caused $50,000 in property damages and injured 2 people.
F3	N of Highland to Pocahontas to Greenville	Madison, Bond	IL	38.75°N 89.67°W	22:00-?	18 mi (29 km)	200 yd (180 m)	2 deaths - Caused $5,000,000 in property damages and injured twenty-five people.
F3	SW of Franklin to S of Horseshoe Bend	Izard	AR	36.12°N 91.83°W	22:25-?	7.8 mi (12.6 km)	33 yd (30 m)	Caused $30 in property damages.
F1	ESE of Baldwin to NNW of Coulterville	Randolph, Washington	IL	38.17°N 89.78°W	23:30-?	9.6 mi (15.4 km)	50 yd (46 m)	Caused $25,000 in property damages.

== See also ==
- Tornadoes of 1950
- List of North American tornadoes and tornado outbreaks
