= Tornado outbreak of February 11–13, 1950 =

Weather event in the United States

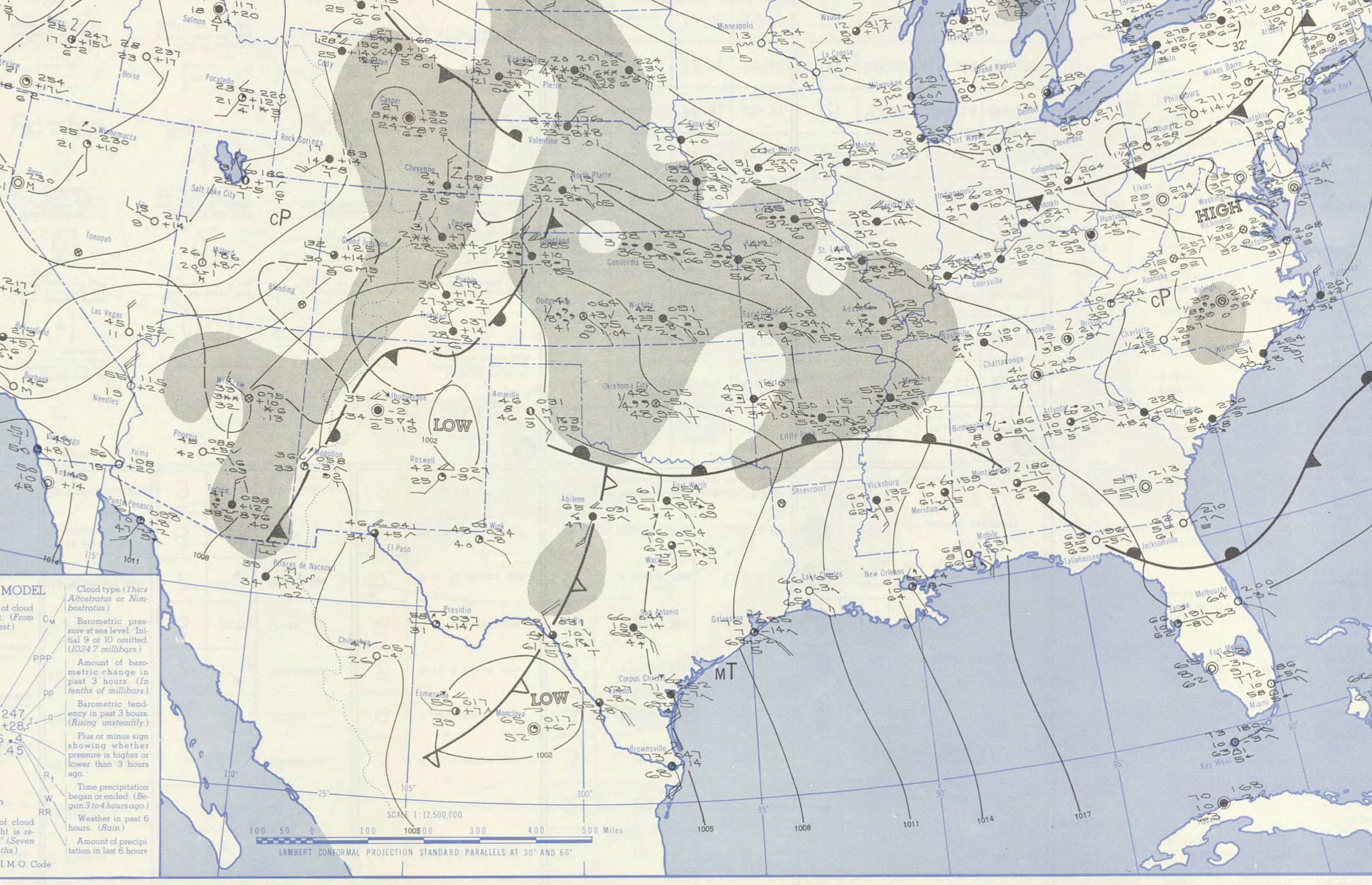
- Weather map on February 12, showing weather features during the tornado outbreak

Tornado outbreak
- Tornadoes: 24
- Max. rating: F4 tornado
- Duration: February 11–13, 1950

Overall effects
- Fatalities: 41+
- Injuries: 228
- Damage: ≥ $1,560,000 ($20,880,000 in 2025 USD) (Note: All losses are in 1950 United States dollars unless otherwise noted.)
- Areas affected: Mainly Red River and Lower Mississippi Valleys
- Part of the tornadoes and tornado outbreaks of 1950

A deadly tornado outbreak devastated parts of Louisiana and Tennessee on February 11–13, 1950. (Note: An outbreak is generally defined as a group of at least six tornadoes (the number sometimes varies slightly according to local climatology) with no more than a six-hour gap between individual tornadoes. An outbreak sequence, prior to (after) the start of modern records in 1950, is defined as a period of no more than two (one) consecutive days without at least one significant (F2 or stronger) tornado.) The outbreak covered about a day and a half and produced numerous tornadoes, mostly from East Texas to the lower Mississippi Valley, with activity concentrated in Texas and Louisiana. Most of the deaths occurred in Louisiana and Tennessee, where tornadoes killed 25 and 9 people, respectively. Several long-lived tornado families struck the Red River region of northwestern Louisiana, especially the Shreveport–Bossier City area. One of the tornadoes attained violent intensity, F4, on the Fujita scale and caused eight deaths, including six at the Shreveport Holding and Reconsignment Depot near Barksdale Air Force Base. It remains one of the top ten deadliest tornadoes on record in the state of Louisiana, in tenth place. Also in Louisiana, two other destructive tornadoes on parallel paths killed 16. Seven additional deaths occurred across the border in East Texas. Nine people died in a tornado in western Tennessee as well. In all, the entire outbreak killed at least 41 people and left 228 injured. Also, several long-tracked tornadoes recorded in the outbreak likely contained more, shorter-lived tornadoes.

== Outbreak statistics ==
Daily statistics of tornadoes during the tornado outbreak of February 11–13, 1950
| Date (Note: All dates are based on the local time zone where the tornado touched down; however, all times are in Coordinated Universal Time and dates are split at midnight CST/CDT for consistency.) | Total | F-scale rating (Note: The Fujita scale was devised under the aegis of scientist T. Theodore Fujita in the early 1970s. Prior to the advent of the scale in 1971, tornadoes in the United States were officially unrated. Tornado ratings were retroactively applied to events prior to the formal adoption of the F-scale by the National Weather Service. While the Fujita scale has been superseded by the Enhanced Fujita scale in the U.S. since February 1, 2007, Canada used the old scale until April 1, 2013; nations elsewhere, like the United Kingdom, apply other classifications such as the TORRO scale.) | | | | | | | Deaths | Injuries | Damage (Note: The National Oceanic and Atmospheric Administration's Storm Data publication does not list exact damage totals for every event, instead giving damage categories. As such, damage for individual tornadoes is not comprehensive.) |
| Date | Total | FU | F0 | F1 | F2 | F3 | F4 | F5 | Deaths | Injuries | Damage |
|---|---|---|---|---|---|---|---|---|---|---|---|
| February 11 | 6 | 0 | 0 | 0 | 4 | 2 | 0 | 0 | 2 | 57 | ≥$645,000 |
| February 12 | 15 | 1 | 0 | 2 | 8 | 3 | 1 | 0 | 30+ | 162 | ≥$883,000 |
| February 13 | 3 | 0 | 0 | 1 | 2 | 0 | 0 | 0 | 9 | 9 | $32,000 |
| Total | 24 | 1 | 0 | 3 | 14 | 5 | 1 | 0 | 41+ | 228 | ≥$1,560,000 |

== Confirmed tornadoes ==
Confirmed tornadoes by Fujita rating
| FU | F0 | F1 | F2 | F3 | F4 | F5 | Total |
|---|---|---|---|---|---|---|---|
| 1 | 0 | 3 | 14 | 5 | 1 | 0 | 24 |

Prior to 1990, there is a likely undercount of tornadoes, particularly E/F0–1, with reports of weaker tornadoes becoming more common as population increased. A sharp increase in the annual average E/F0–1 count by approximately 200 tornadoes was noted upon the implementation of NEXRAD Doppler weather radar in 1990–1991. (Note: Historically, the number of tornadoes globally and in the United States was and is likely underrepresented: research by Grazulis on annual tornado activity suggests that, as of 2001, only 53% of yearly U.S. tornadoes were officially recorded. Documentation of tornadoes outside the United States was historically less exhaustive, owing to the lack of monitors in many nations and, in some cases, to internal political controls on public information. Most countries only recorded tornadoes that produced severe damage or loss of life. Significant low biases in U.S. tornado counts likely occurred through the early 1990s, when advanced NEXRAD was first installed and the National Weather Service began comprehensively verifying tornado occurrences.) 1974 marked the first year where significant tornado (E/F2+) counts became homogenous with contemporary values, attributed to the consistent implementation of Fujita scale assessments. Numerous discrepancies on the details of tornadoes in this outbreak exist between sources. The total count of tornadoes and ratings differs from various agencies accordingly. The list below documents information from the most contemporary official sources alongside assessments from tornado historian Thomas P. Grazulis.

Color/symbol key
| Color / symbol | Description |
|---|---|
| † | Data from Grazulis 1990/1993/2001b |
| ¶ | Data from a local National Weather Service office |
| ※ | Data from the 1950 Climatological Data National Summary publication |
| ‡ | Data from the NCEI database |
| ♯ | Maximum width of tornado |
| ± | Tornado was rated below F2 intensity by Grazulis but a specific rating is unavailable. |

=== February 11 event ===
List of confirmed tornadoes – Saturday, February 11, 1950
| F# | Location | County / Parish | State | Start Coord. (Note: All starting coordinates are based on the NCEI database and may not reflect contemporary analyses) | Time (UTC) | Path length | Width (Note: The listed width values are primarily the average/mean width of the tornadoes, with those having known maximum widths denoted by ♯. From 1952 to 1994, reports largely list mean width whereas contemporary years list maximum width. Values provided by Grazulis are the average width, with estimates being rounded down (i.e. 0.5 mi (0.80 km) is rounded down from 880 yards to 800 yards.) | Damage |
|---|---|---|---|---|---|---|---|---|
| F2 | Alvin※ | Brazoria | TX | 29.42°N 95.25°W | 19:10–? | 7 mi (11 km)※ | 300 yd (270 m)† | $75,000† |
| F2 | 20 businesses and homes were destroyed or unroofed. The NCEI database incorrectly extends the path to Webster through Galveston and Harris counties. | | | | | | | |
| F3 | Western La Porte† | Harris | TX | 29.67°N 95.05°W | 19:40–?† | 15 mi (24 km)† | 500 yd (460 m)† | $200,000† |
| F3 | 1 death – An intense tornado damaged 25 homes in its path, some of which it destroyed. The remaining homes lost their roofs, and in all, some 200 structures incurred damage. 20 injuries took place, and a female centenarian was killed. | | | | | | | |
| F2† | Montalba | Anderson | TX | Unknown | 02:30–? | 2 mi (3.2 km) | 100 yd (91 m) | Unknown |
| F2† | Barns and a home were wrecked. Items from the buildings were strewn 1 mi (1.6 km) distant. | | | | | | | |
| F2 | Chappell Hill† | Smith | TX | 35°N 95.2°W | 03:00–? | 10 mi (16 km)† | 75 yd (69 m)† | $100,000 |
| F2 | This strong tornado passed just east of Tyler, leveling 16 structures, including the store of a blacksmith and three homes. The tornado passed within 100 yd (300 ft) of a church with 300 people in attendance. Five people were injured. | | | | | | | |
| F2† | E of Pine to Omaha | Camp, Titus, Morris | TX | Unknown | 05:30–? | ≥2 mi (3.2 km) | 20 yd (18 m) | ≥$70,000 |
| F2† | A pair of homes were wrecked near the start of the path, resulting in a pair of injuries. At Omaha a gymnasium at a school was destroyed, along with several homes. | | | | | | | |
| F3† | S of Hughes Springs to Corley to E of New Boston† | Cass, Bowie | TX | 32.98°N 94.63°W | 05:45†–06:30 | 30 mi (48 km)† | 150 yd (140 m)† | $200,000† |
| F3† | 1 death – At Hugh Springs 15 homes were a total loss and 24 others received damage. 15 injuries occurred in town. At Corley the tornado affected 15 additional homes, some of which it wrecked. Eight people were injured at Corley. In all 30 people were injured along the path. | | | | | | | |

=== February 12 event ===
List of confirmed tornadoes – Sunday, February 12, 1950
| F# | Location | County / Parish | State | Start Coord. | Time (UTC) | Path length | Width | Damage |
|---|---|---|---|---|---|---|---|---|
| F1 | Downtown Dublin | Erath | TX | 32.08°N 98.35°W | 07:15–? | 2.3 mi (3.7 km)‡ | 250 yd (230 m)※ | $20,000※ |
| F1 | Five structures were seriously damaged. | | | | | | | |
| F2† | Baileyville | Falls | TX | Unknown | 11:30–? | 2 mi (3.2 km) | 100 yd (91 m) | $25,000 |
| F2† | A strong tornado destroyed 10 homes. Five people were injured. | | | | | | | |
| F2 | SSW of Davis Prairie to southern Groesbeck† | Limestone | TX | 31.52°N 96.55°W | 11:45–?† | 8 mi (13 km)† | 70 yd (64 m)† | $25,000† |
| F2 | At Groesbeck approximately 20 businesses and homes lost their roofs or were destroyed. Debris rained on the courthouse in town, though the tornado dissipated beforehand. Four people were injured. | | | | | | | |
| F2† | Gill | Harrison | TX | Unknown | 16:00–? | 6 mi (9.7 km) | 100 yd (91 m) | Unknown |
| F2† | Four homes were wrecked. 10 injuries were reported. | | | | | | | |
| F2† | S of Lufkin to Beulah to S of Huntington | Polk, Angelina | TX | Unknown | 16:42–? | 15 mi (24 km) | 100 yd (91 m) | Unknown |
| F2† | 3 deaths – This tornado struck two rural communities, sweeping away a home and strewing the debris for acres. A father and his two children died, and three other people sustained injuries, including the mother of the children. A school was destroyed as well. | | | | | | | |
| F2† | Near Chireno | Nacogdoches | TX | Unknown | 17:00–? | 8 mi (13 km) | 300 yd (270 m) | Unknown |
| F2† | This tornado wrecked six homes and injured two people. | | | | | | | |
| F3† | S of Center (TX) to Fellowship (TX) to E of Keachi (LA)† | Shelby (TX), DeSoto (LA)† | TX, LA† | 31.8°N 94.2°W | 17:50–?† | 30 mi (48 km)† | 150 yd (140 m)† | $250,000† |
| F3† | 3 deaths – This intense, long-tracked tornado leveled a home at Fellowship, killing two people inside during lunchtime. 32 or more other injuries occurred in and near Fellowship. Other structures were damaged at Jericho. In Louisiana the tornado wrecked 12 homes, killing a third person. The tornado killed hundreds of chickens as well. In all, 37 people were injured along the path. This tornado belonged to the same family as the Shreveport F4 and ended near Logansport, Louisiana. | | | | | | | |
| F2† | Near Hell Creek† | Union | MS | 34.6°N 89.12°W | 18:00–? | 2 mi (3.2 km)† | 33 yd (30 m)‡ | $20,000† |
| F2† | A brief tornado struck four homes and a barn. Three of the homes lost their roofs, and a barn and the fourth home were flattened. | | | | | | | |
| F2 | Cane Creek※ | Grant | AR | 34.48°N 92.4°W | 18:30–? | 0.1 mi (0.16 km)‡ | 100 yd (91 m) | $450※ |
| F2 | A brief-but-strong tornado swept away a barn, flattened a small house, unroofed another home, destroyed an outhouse and a chicken coop, and knocked down a 2-acre (0.81 ha) swath of trees. | | | | | | | |
| F4 | N of Stonewall to Barksdale Air Force Base† | Caddo, Bossier† | LA | 32.35°N 93.77°W | 19:00–? | 20 mi (32 km)† | 100 yd (91 m)† | $350,000† |
| F4 | 8 deaths – A violent tornado tracked just northwest of Forbing, leveling several homes. On the southern outskirts of Shreveport, the tornado caused two deaths. It then hit the Shreveport Holding and Reconsignment Depot, which had recently been renamed Slack Air Force Depot, near Barksdale Air Force Base. The tornado destroyed the Depot, causing the deaths of six people, including five airmen and a civilian worker. Nearby, injuries occurred in a mess hall and barracks as the tornado hit the AFB. With a forward speed of 35 mph (56 km/h), the parent supercell progressed into Arkansas, where it later spawned the Mount Holly F2 tornado. In all, 30 people were injured. | | | | | | | |
| F3† | Near Grand Cane to NE of Sligo† | DeSoto, Bossier† | LA | 32.2°N 93.58°W | 19:24–?† | 35 mi (56 km)† | 200 yd (180 m)† | $90,000† |
| F3† | 7+ deaths – This intense tornado claimed the lives of at least three—possibly four—children in a pair of homes near Grand Cane. On a plantation, the tornado leveled a tenant home, killing three family members inside the structure. Nearby, the tornado overturned a vehicle, killing a pedestrian who was sheltering in a ditch. At least one additional fatality took place before the tornado dissipated, and 30 people were injured along the path. The NCEI database incorrectly lists the path as beginning west of Williams and ending west of Haynesville, passing southeast of the towns of Caspiana and McDade. | | | | | | | |
| F3 | Zwolle to Roy† to Gibsland※ | Sabine, Natchitoches, Bienville‡ | LA | 31.63°N 93.65°W | 20:00–?※ | 74.5 mi (119.9 km)‡ | 100 yd (91 m)※ | ≥$50,000† |
| F3 | 9 deaths – This tornado family first generated intermittent, F1-level damage at Zwolle, along with downburst-related effects. At Roy, near Castor, the tornado destroyed or damaged 25 homes, some of which were leveled, with six deaths in one of them, all of which were in one family; in all eight people died in town. A final fatality occurred just northeast of Castor. The tornado obliterated numerous small homes in its path, but its damage is poorly documented outside Roy. Bodies of the dead were carried as far as 1/4 mi (0.40 km) from their original locations. 40 people were injured along the path. | | | | | | | |
| F2 | N of Mount Holly† | Union, Ouachita† | AR | 33.27°N 92.95°W | 21:00–? | 6 mi (9.7 km)† | 100 yd (91 m) | $20,000※ |
| F2 | A strong tornado damaged electrical wires, a store, and an oil camp. Additionally, the tornado leveled many barns and three homes. | | | | | | | |
| FU※ | Near Lovell Lake–LaBelle | Jefferson | TX | Unknown | 21:30–? | Unknown | 50 yd (46 m) | $8,100 |
| FU※ | Eight homes were destroyed or damaged. One person was injured. | | | | | | | |
| F1 | E of Epps‡ | East Carroll | LA | 32.6°N 91.33°W | 05:00–? | 0.5 mi (0.80 km)‡ | 33 yd (30 m)‡ | $25,000‡ |
| F1 | A brief, weak tornado struck several structures, causing minimal damage. | | | | | | | |

=== February 13 event ===
List of confirmed tornadoes – Monday, February 13, 1950
| F# | Location | County / Parish | State | Start Coord. | Time (UTC) | Path length | Width | Damage |
|---|---|---|---|---|---|---|---|---|
| F1 | Rosemark | Shelby | TN | 35.35°N 89.77°W | 07:00–? | 0.2 mi (0.32 km)‡ | 7 yd (6.4 m)‡ | $2,000※ |
| F1 | A short-lived tornado destroyed outbuildings and caused extensive damage to a few farmhouses. Eight people were injured inside one of the houses. | | | | | | | |
| F2 | Hurricane Hill※ | Lauderdale | TN | 35.75°N 89.48°W | 08:00–? | 2 mi (3.2 km)† | 20 yd (18 m)† | $5,000※ |
| F2 | 9 deaths – A very brief but devastating tornado struck a residential area, leveling a few small homes on the hilltop. Two parents and their six children were inside one of the homes that were swept away. The structure, which was poorly built, was lofted 85 yd (255 ft) before disintegrating, killing all nine occupants. An injury occurred as well. As of 2017, this is the deadliest F2/EF2 tornado ever recorded in the United States. | | | | | | | |
| F2 | Southeastern New Albany† | Union | MS | 34.6°N 89.12°W | 09:20–? | 5 mi (8.0 km)† | 33 yd (30 m)‡ | $25,000‡ |
| F2 | This tornado leveled a small residence in its path. Additionally, it destroyed three barns nearby. The NCEI database lists a pair of injuries and three fatalities, but Grazulis does not list any casualties. | | | | | | | |

== Non-tornadic effects ==
A severe thunderstorm generated strong winds just 1 1/2 mi (2.4 km) east of Pushmataha, Choctaw County, Alabama, at 6:00 p.m. EST (00:00 UTC) on February 13. The winds felled trees and damaged a trio of homes, one of which was leveled. Almost 18 hours previous barns and a few homes were damaged by strong winds at Marietta, Cass County, Texas. A day earlier hail and wind caused negligible damage to property in and near Winnsboro, Louisiana, as well.

== See also ==
- List of tornadoes striking downtown areas
- List of North American tornadoes and tornado outbreaks
  - List of F4 and EF4 tornadoes

== Sources ==
- Agee, Ernest M.; Childs, Samuel (June 1, 2014). "Adjustments in Tornado Counts, F-Scale Intensity, and Path Width for Assessing Significant Tornado Destruction". Journal of Applied Meteorology and Climatology. 53 (6). American Meteorological Society: 1494–1505. doi:10.1175/JAMC-D-13-0235.1.
- Brooks, Harold E. (April 2004). "On the Relationship of Tornado Path Length and Width to Intensity". Weather and Forecasting. 19 (2): 310–19. Bibcode:2004WtFor..19..310B. doi:10.1175/1520-0434(2004)019<0310:OTROTP>2.0.CO;2.
- Cook, A. R.; Schaefer, J. T. (August 2008). "The Relation of El Niño–Southern Oscillation (ENSO) to Winter Tornado Outbreaks". Monthly Weather Review. 136 (8): 3121–3137. Bibcode:2008MWRv..136.3121C. doi:10.1175/2007MWR2171.1.
- Edwards, Roger; LaDue, James G.; Ferree, John T.; Scharfenberg, Kevin; Maier, Chris; Coulbourne, William L. (May 1, 2013). "Tornado Intensity Estimation: Past, Present, and Future". Bulletin of the American Meteorological Society. 94 (5). American Meteorological Society: 641–653. doi:10.1175/BAMS-D-11-00006.1.
- Grazulis, Thomas P. (May 1984). Violent Tornado Climatography, 1880–1982. OSTI (Technical report). NUREG. Washington, D.C.: Nuclear Regulatory Commission. OSTI 7099491. CR-3670.
  - — (November 1990). Significant Tornadoes 1880–1989. Vol. 2. St. Johnsbury, Vermont: The Tornado Project of Environmental Films. ISBN 1-879362-02-3.
  - — (July 1993). Significant Tornadoes 1680–1991: A Chronology and Analysis of Events. St. Johnsbury, Vermont: The Tornado Project of Environmental Films. ISBN 1-879362-03-1.
  - — (2001a). The Tornado: Nature's Ultimate Windstorm. Norman, Oklahoma: University of Oklahoma Press. ISBN 978-0-8061-3538-0.
  - — (2001b). F5-F6 Tornadoes. St. Johnsbury, Vermont: The Tornado Project of Environmental Films.
- National Weather Service (February 1950). Storm Data Publication (Report). National Centers for Environmental Information – via Storm Events Database.
- U.S. Weather Bureau (February 1950). "Storm data and unusual weather phenomena". Climatological Data National Summary. 1 (2). Asheville, North Carolina: National Climatic Data Center: 10–1.
