= Tornado outbreak of April 28–29, 1950 =

Weather event in the United States

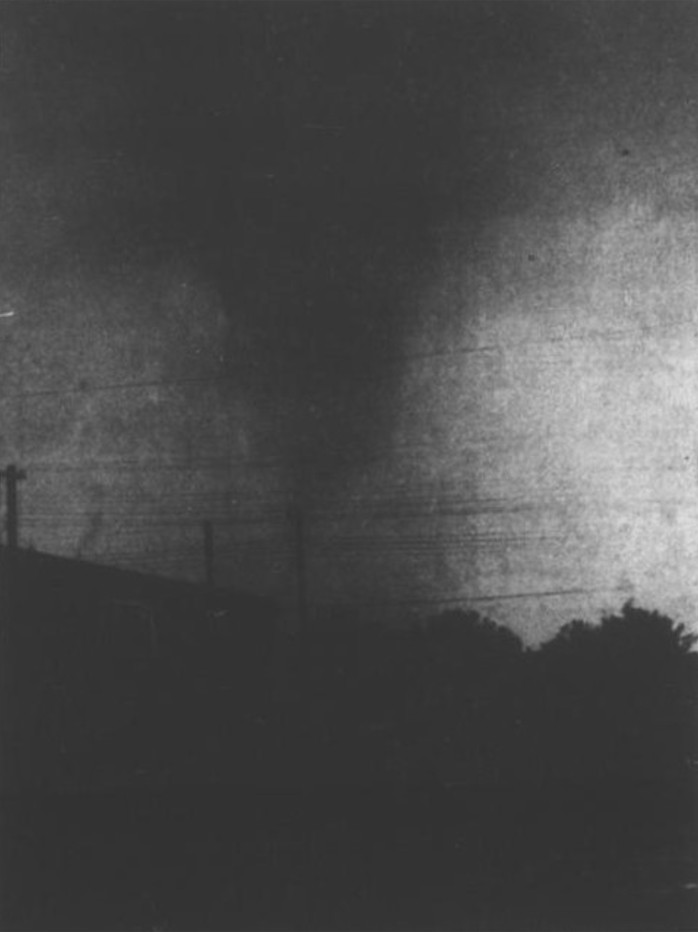
- An F4 tornado near Clyde, Texas.

Meteorological history
- Formed: April 28, 1950
- Dissipated: April 29, 1950

Tornado outbreak
- Tornadoes: 7 confirmed
- Max. rating: F4 tornado
- Duration: 1 day, 1 hour, 13 minutes
- Max. snowfall: >24 in (61 cm)

Overall effects
- Fatalities: 11
- Injuries: 38
- Damage: $1.575 million (1950 USD) $21.1 million (2025 USD)
- Areas affected: Oklahoma, Kansas, Texas, Mississippi
- Part of the tornado outbreaks of 1950

An outbreak of seven tornadoes struck the Central Plains and Mississippi in Late-April 1950. Five of the seven tornadoes were significant (F2+), including two violent F4 tornadoes in Texas and Oklahoma, both of which killed five. Overall, the outbreak killed 11, injured 38, and caused $1.575 million in damage. A lightning strike at Lake Texoma in Oklahoma caused an additional fatality and injury as well.

== Meteorological synopsis ==
A surge of deep tropical moisture streamed northward out of the Gulf of Mexico and into the Southern Plains on April 28. A warm front extended southeastward out of the Rockies before curling northeastward over the Southern Texas Panhandle and transitioning into a cold front over North Central Oklahoma. A dryline extended outward from the southern part of the warm front to a low pressure system over Northern Mexico just south of the Texas border. Although wind shear was modest a best, favorable turning of height was noted. All these ingredients led to the development of severe thunderstorms and tornadoes.

== Confirmed tornadoes ==
Confirmed tornadoes by Fujita rating
FU	F0	F1	F2	F3	F4	F5	Total
0	0	2	2	1	2	0	7

=== April 28 event ===
List of confirmed tornadoes – Friday, April 28, 1950 (Note: All dates are based on the local time zone where the tornado touched down; however, all times are in Coordinated Universal Time and dates are split at midnight CST/CDT for consistency.) (Note: Prior to 1994, only the average widths of tornado paths were officially listed.)
F#	Location	County / Parish	State	Start coord.	Time (UTC)	Path length	Max. width	Summary
F3	Lugert to Cambridge to WNW of Sentinel	Kiowa, Washita	OK	34.88°N 99.28°W	20:17–20:51	20.8 miles (33.5 km)	400 yards (370 m)	1 death – This intense, multi-vortex tornado touched down at Lake Lugert and moved northeastward, before first turning north-northeastward and then north, passing east of Lone Wolf and through Cambridge while moving at 30 to 35 miles per hour (48 to 56 km/h). Five homes were destroyed, three others suffered major damage, and three more had minor damage and 17 families affected. The tornado struck 17 farmsteads in its path. There was one injury and $750,000 in damages. As many as three tornado columns were observed at one time and a CAA airways observer reported that the column turning counter-clockwise. Heavy rain accompanied by hail fell after the tornado had dissipated.
F1	NE of Gridley to Sharpe to SSW of Waverly	Coffey	KS	38.12°N 95.85°W	23:00–?	19.8 miles (31.9 km)	33 yards (30 m)	This was likely a tornado family as several funnel clouds and tornadoes were reported along the track of this tornado. It passed west of Burlington—where two small funnel clouds were seen—east of New Strawn, and through Sharpe while causing scattered damage along its path. Barns and other small buildings were damaged or destroyed and numerous trees were twisted out of the ground. There was $25,000 in damages.
F4	Northern Clyde	Callahan	TX	32.42°N 99.5°W	00:00–?	1.3 miles (2.1 km)	233 yards (213 m)	5 deaths – This short-lived but violent tornado moved north-northeastward through the north side of Clyde, obliterating everything in its path. 21 homes were destroyed or damaged. Nothing remained of two homes but debris scattered for more than 1 mi (1.6 km). A refrigerator lodged atop a telephone pole 1/2 mi (0.80 km) distant as well. Five people were injured and losses totaled $250,000. Hail that accompanied the storm damaged crops as well.
F4	Holdenville	Hughes	OK	35.08°N 96.4°W	01:05–?	4.5 miles (7.2 km)	200 yards (180 m)	5 deaths – This violent tornado began 2 mi (3.2 km) southwest of Holdenville at 7:05 pm CST and moved northeastward directly through the city. It cut a swath of destruction six blocks wide and 18 blocks long in the northwest section of Holdenville. A total of 38 homes were destroyed while 188 other homes were damaged. After exiting Holdenville, the tornado turned to the north and dissipated 1 mi (1.6 km) north of town. There were 32 injuries and $250,000 in damage. The NWS Norman puts the property losses in Holdenville at $500,000. Two of the dead were found 150 yd (140 m) from their homesite.
F2	NE of Coalgate to Cottonwood	Coal	OK	34.55°N 96.2°W	01:30–?	0.8 miles (1.3 km)	100 yards (91 m)	A short-lived but strong tornado struck Cottonwood 1.5 miles (2.4 km) northeast of Coalgate, destroying two homes, five barns, and a car. Damage was estimated at $25,000.

=== April 29 event ===
List of confirmed tornadoes – Saturday, April 29, 1950
F#	Location	County / Parish	State	Start coord.	Time (UTC)	Path length	Max. width	Summary
F2	Columbia to N of Improve	Marion	MS	31.27°N 89.83°W	18:00–20:00	11.3 miles (18.2 km)	100 yards (91 m)	A strong and very destructive tornado impacted Columbia and areas to the northeast, destroying six buildings and damaging 225 others. Losses totaled $250,000.
F1	Comanche to WSW of Newburg	Comanche	TX	31.9°N 98.6°W	21:30–?	11.5 miles (18.5 km)	200 yards (180 m)	This tornado, which was accompanied by large hail, moved southward through Comanche and into rural farmland, damaging ranches, dairy farms, some crops, and livestock. Although losses were estimated $25,000, the CDNS report states that the storm as a whole caused $62,400 in damage with hail doing about $600 of that.

== Non-tornadic events ==
Scattered severe thunderstorms affected areas from the Central Plains to the Southeast on April 28. In North Carolina, large hail covered an area of 4 square miles in Central Pasquotank County, 50 square miles of Eastern Perquimans County, and 2 square miles in Central Nash County. In St. Louis, Missouri, lightning struck and damaged several streetcars while strong winds caused some additional minor damage along with knocking down telephone poles. Right before the Clyde, Texas F4 tornado further to the east, a storm produced large hail the dented cars and house roofs and destroyed neon signs. April 29 saw more severe weather across Mississippi, Texas, Oklahoma and Louisiana. In Mississippi, strong winds damaged or destroyed timber and power and communications lines in Lincoln County as well as swath from Woodville to Liberty, Mississippi. Large hail in Copiah County damaged tomato plants and buds and destroyed cabbage crops. There was also some hail damage in Claiborne Parish, Louisiana. At Lake Texoma, in Bryan County, Oklahoma, a lightning strike hit near a boat containing two men on the water, killing one of them and injuring the other.

The system that produced the severe weather also generated a large snow storm across most of Montana between April 27-29 with many areas receiving over 24 in (61 cm). Over 1,000 lambs were lost in one community and heavy drifting blocked many roads. Heavy snow also impacted South Dakota on April 29 with average depths of 6 inches (15 cm) with locally higher amounts of 12–17 inches (30–43 cm). Some young livestock was lost.

== See also ==
- List of North American tornadoes and tornado outbreaks
  - List of F4 and EF4 tornadoes
- Tornado outbreak of April 28–30, 1960
