= Tornadoes of 1950 =

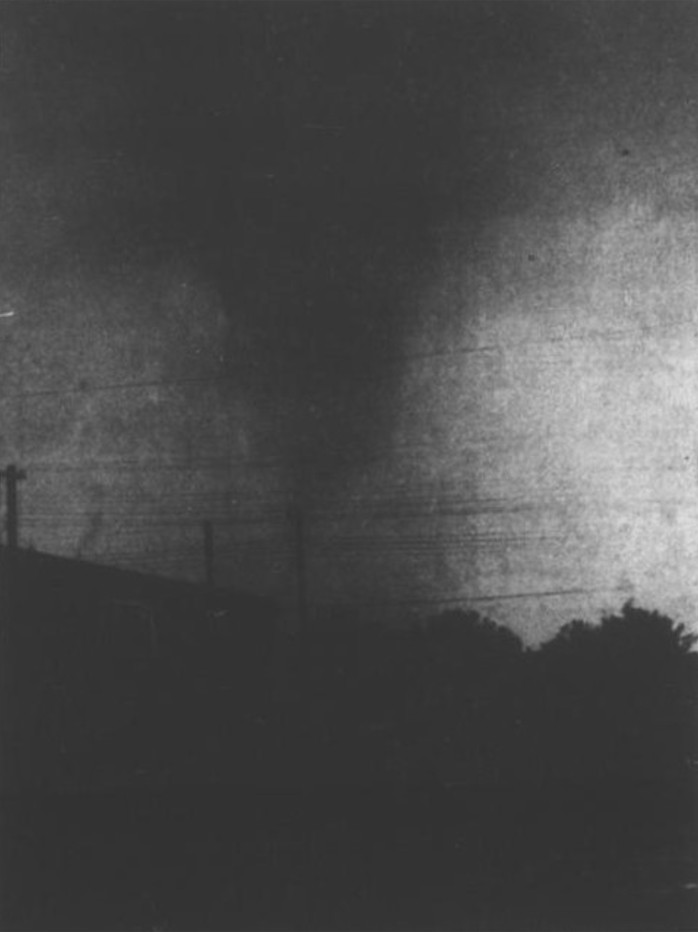
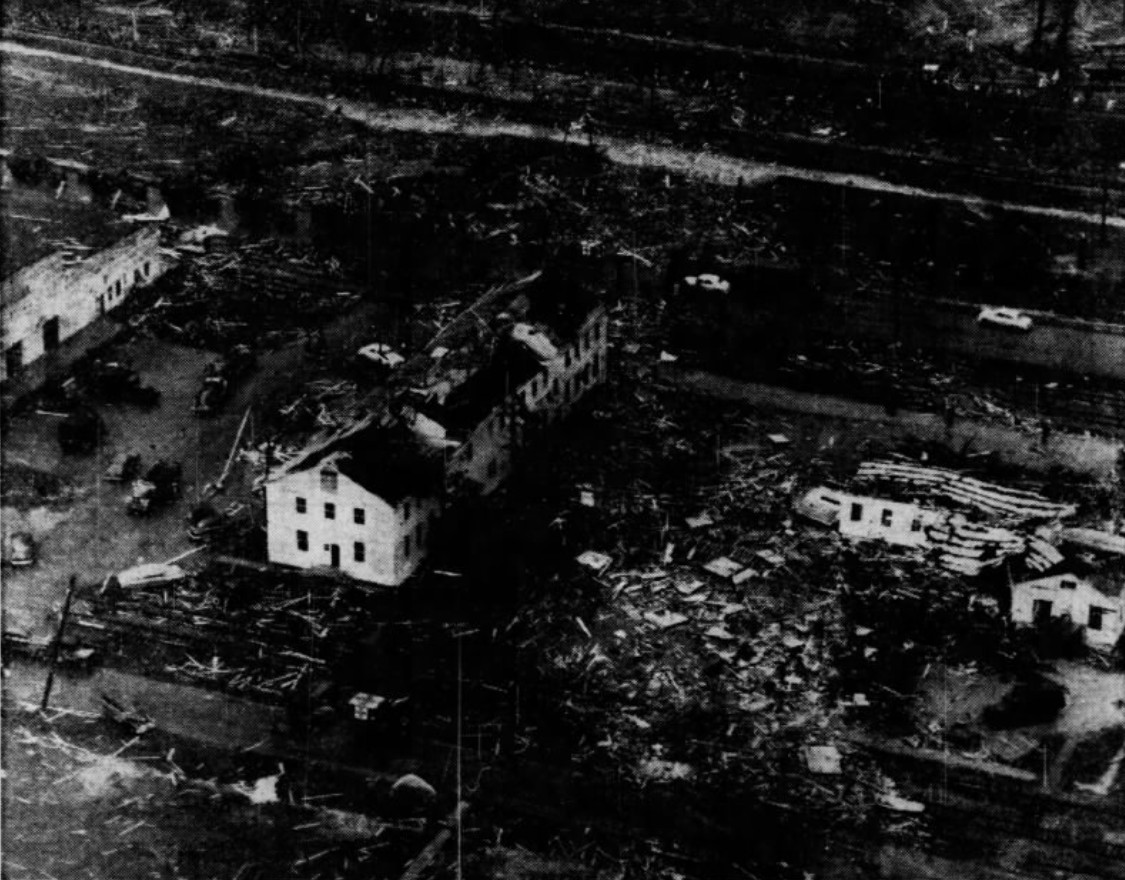
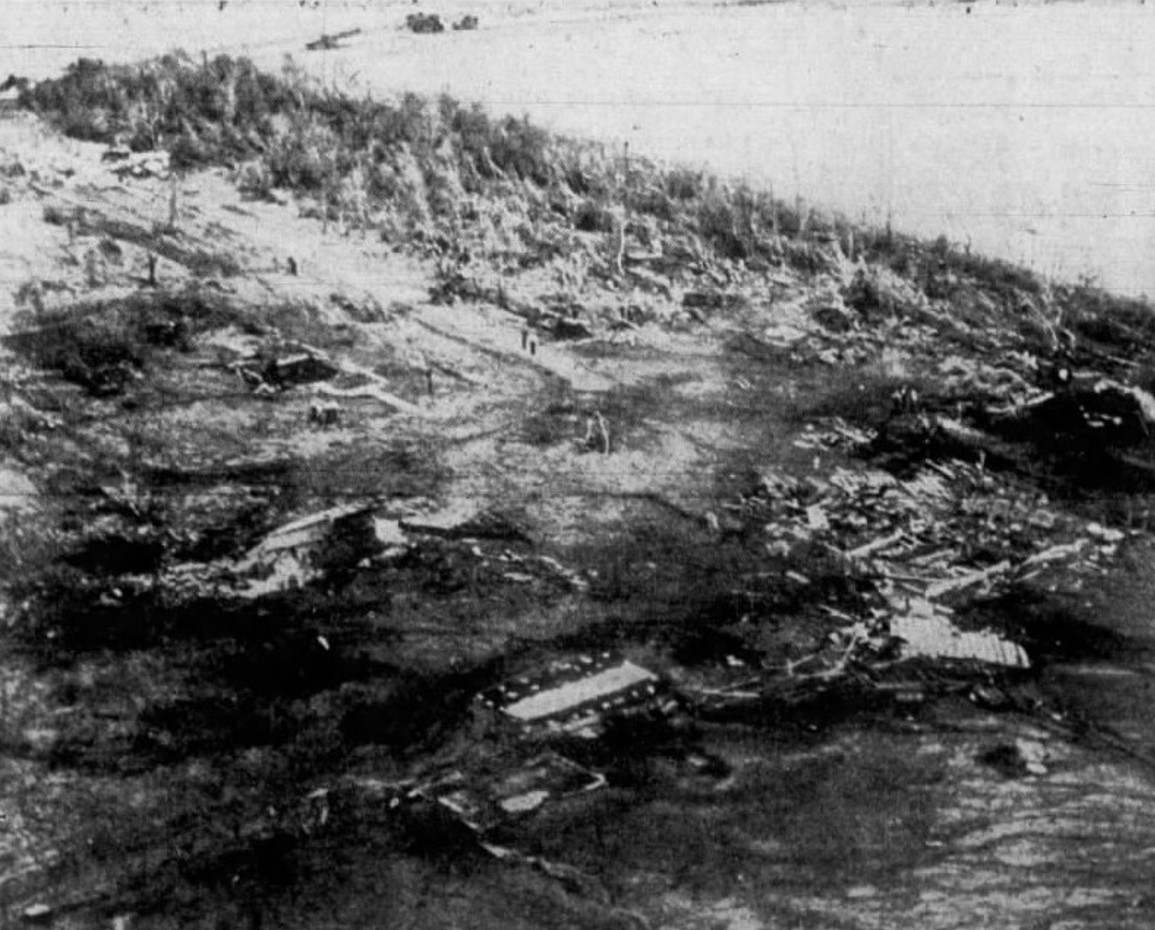
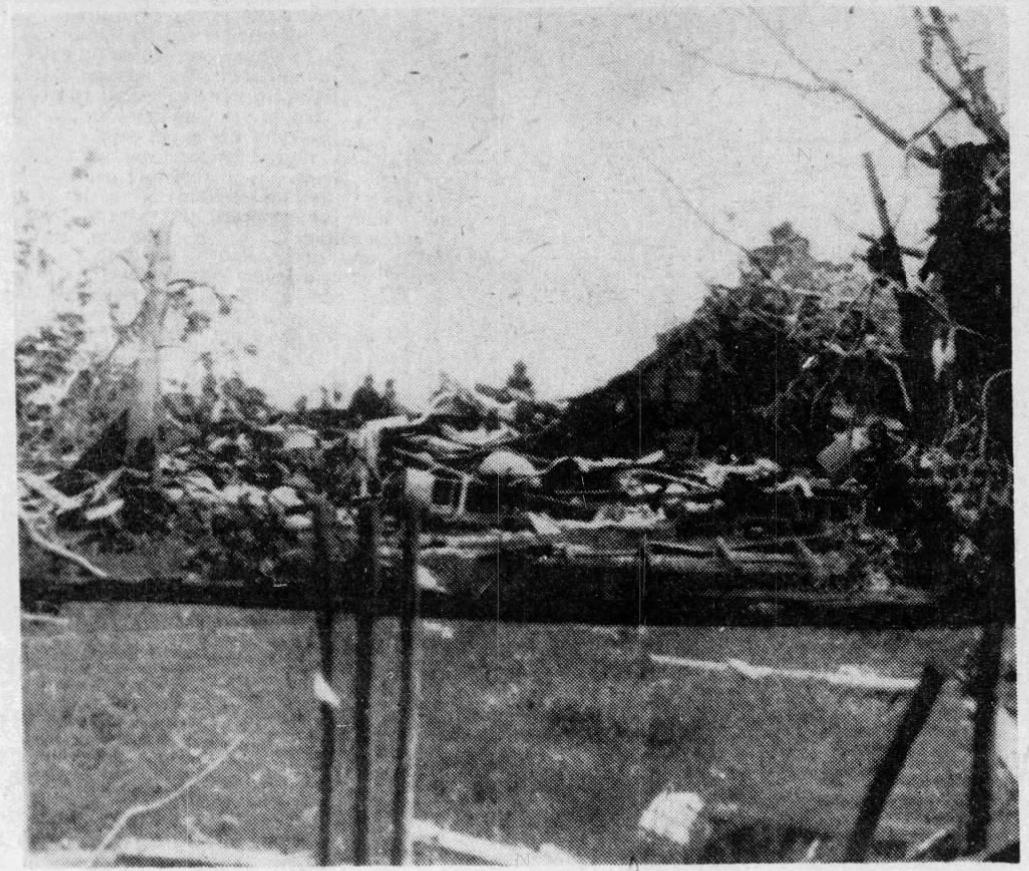
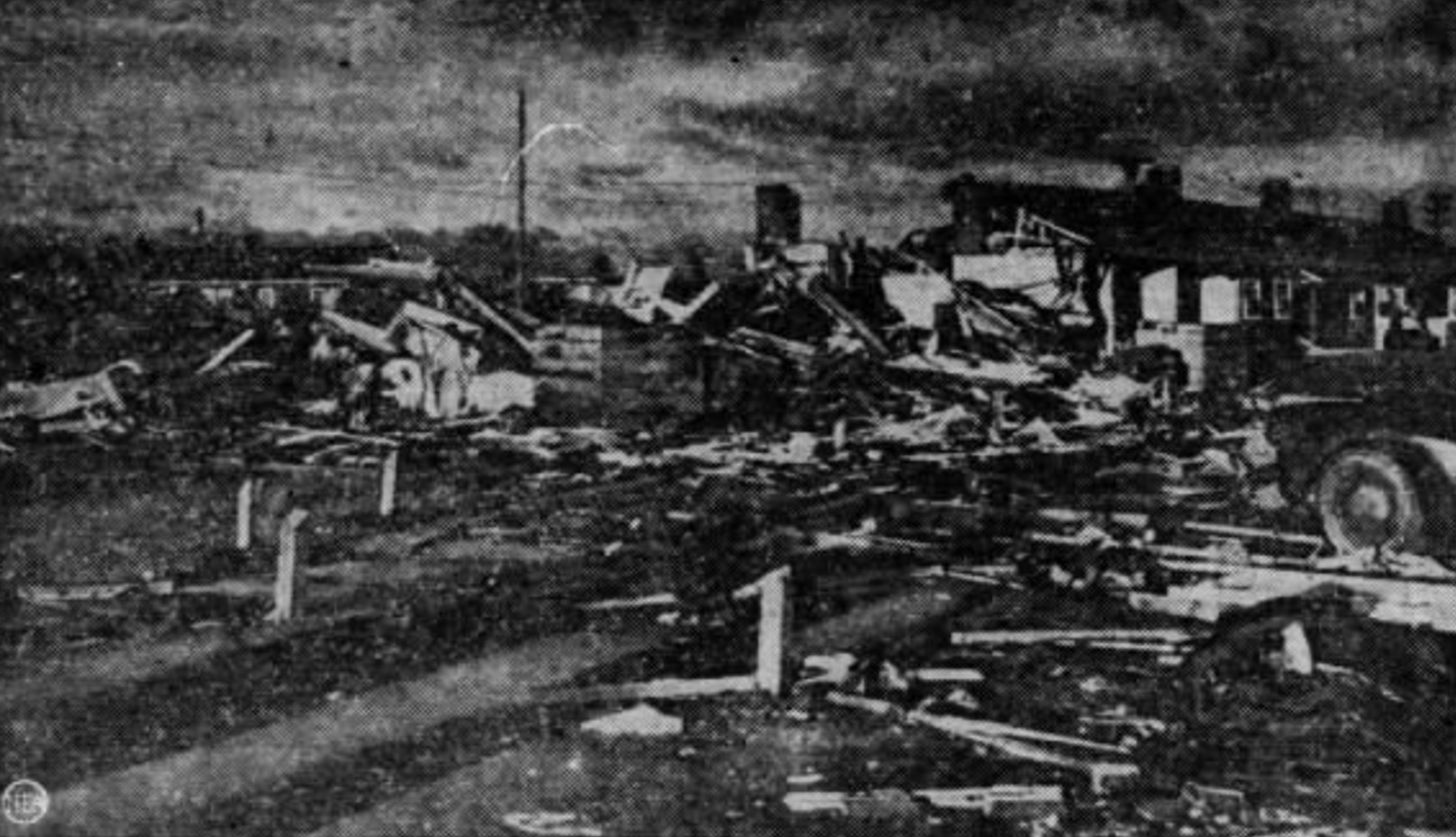
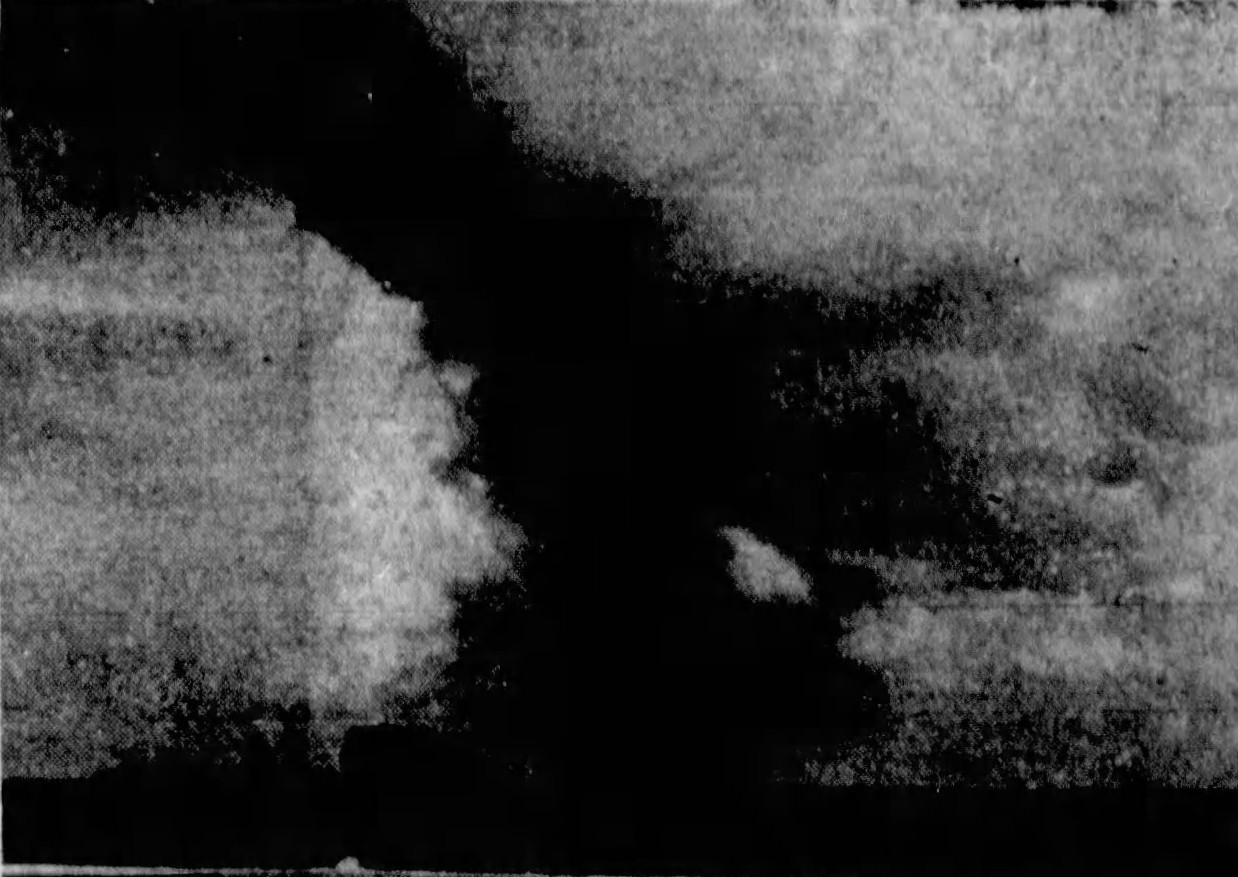
- Clockwise from top: A violent F4 tornado near Clyde, Texas on April 28; a farm in Burt County, Nebraska after an F4 tornado on July 15; damage in Great Bend, Kansas after an F4 tornado on May 4, 1950; a dusty F2 tornado northwest of Bloomfield, Nebraska on June 13; a home near Rhinelander, Wisconsin after an F4 tornado on June 25; Slack Air Force Base after an F4 tornado on February 12.
- Timespan: January 3 — December 2
Maximum rated tornado
F4 tornado
- List
  – Shreveport, Louisiana
  on February 13
  – Clyde, Texas
  on April 28
  – Holdenville, Oklahoma
  on April 28
  – Zook-Great Bend, Kansas
  on May 4
  – McPherson, Kansas
  on June 8
  – Rhinelander, Wisconsin
  on June 25
  – Uehling, Nebraska
  on July 15
- Tornadoes in U.S.: 201
- Damage (U.S.): $34.428 million (1950 USD) $461 million (2025 USD)
- Fatalities (U.S.): 70
- Fatalities (worldwide): >70

This page documents the tornadoes and tornado outbreaks of 1950, primarily in the United States. Most tornadoes form in the U.S. and Canada, although they can occur worldwide.

This was the first year where tornadoes were officially documented by the U.S. Weather Bureau, which would later become the National Weather Service. Tornado statistics for early years like this often appear significantly lower than modern years due to underreporting of confirmed tornadoes; as a result, 1950 is the least active tornado season ever recorded. In subsequent years, documentation of tornadoes became much more widespread and efficient, with the average annual tornado count being around 1,253.

The total count of tornadoes and ratings differs from various agencies accordingly. This article therefore documents information from the most contemporary official sources alongside retroactive assessments made by tornado historian Thomas P. Grazulis.

== Events ==
Fatal United States tornadoes in 1950
- Approximate touchdown location of killer tornadoes in 1950 Summary of tornadoes: January 13 – Arkansas (1 death); February 11 – Texas (1 death); February 12 – Texas (1 death); February 12 – Mississippi (3 deaths); February 12 – Texas (3 deaths); February 12 – Louisiana (8 deaths); February 12 – Louisiana (7+ deaths); February 12 – Louisiana (9 deaths); February 13 – Tennessee (9 deaths); March 27 – Mississippi (1 death); April 2 – Arkansas (1 death); April 28 – Oklahoma (1 death); April 28 – Texas (5 deaths); April 28 – Oklahoma (5 deaths); May 2 – Louisiana (1 death); May 4 – Texas (1 death); June 3 – Mississippi (2 deaths); June 8 – Kansas (1 death); June 25 – Wisconsin (1 death); June 25 – Wisconsin (2 deaths); December 2 – Illinois (1 death); December 2 – Illinois (2 deaths); Total fatalities: 70

A major milestone in weather history, 1950 marks the first public tornado warning and the first use of radar technology to track storms. With this, tornado records began to be kept and a database was started. However, tornadoes were not assigned ratings until the Fujita scale came into effect in 1973, at which point every confirmed tornado back to 1950 was officially rated.

1950 had an early and violent start to the year, with the first tornadoes touching down on January 3, when two F3 tornadoes and one F1 tornado touched down. One of the F3 tornadoes struck the northern suburbs of St. Louis, Missouri and caused almost $3 million in damage. The first killer tornado of 1950 was a lone F3 tornado on January 13 which struck Polk County, Arkansas, killing one and injuring another. A rare F2 tornado also touched down in Northeastern Illinois on January 26. This is one of only two tornadoes to hit that area in the month of January with the other being an EF3 tornado on January 7, 2008. A deadly tornado outbreak occurred between February 11–13 across the Southern United States. A total of 19 tornadoes touched down, including an F4 tornado which left at least 18 people dead along an 82.6-mile-long (132.9 km) track in Louisiana on February 12. There were eight killer tornadoes, six of which were on February 12, which left at least 45 people dead. Two other long-track tornadoes touched down in Louisiana, including an F3 tornado which tracked 74.5 miles (119.9 km) and left five dead, and an F2 tornado which traveled 58.4 miles (94.0 km) and left another five dead.

Deadly outbreaks also occurred during the next two months of the year. The end of March saw 16 tornadoes in the Mississippi Valley with one fatality and 52 injuries. Little Rock, Arkansas was hit by an F2 tornado during the outbreak while back-to-back F2 tornadoes also hit Jackson, Mississippi. April began with a small outbreak that generated a fatal F3 tornado that killed one and injured eight in Tuckerman, Arkansas before a bigger outbreak took place at the end of the month. Seven tornadoes touched down in the Central Plains and Mississippi, including violent F4 tornadoes in both Texas and Oklahoma, killing 11 and injuring 38.

The beginning of May, the most active month of the year on average in the United States, produced another tornado outbreak across the Central Plains, killing one and injuring 26. An F4 tornado in the outbreak produced near-F5 damage in Zook, Kansas. The end of the month saw four tornadoes strike the United Kingdom, killing four people. June had at least four killer tornadoes in the United States. At the beginning of the month, an F3 tornado killed two and injured one north of Kosciusko, Mississippi. Several days later, a violent F4 tornado hit Southern McPherson, Kansas, killing one and injuring five. A couple of weeks later, a tornado outbreak in Wisconsin produced killer F2 and F4 tornadoes in Colby and Rhinelander, respectively, killing three and injuring 12. An additional outbreak sequence that took place during the middle of the month before that one injured 110 people with 101 of those injuries coming from an F2 tornado in Center, Nebraska. Tornado activity began to decrease in July, but an F4 tornado did injure 33 north of Uehling, Nebraska during the middle of the month. Four days later, 30 more people were injured when an F3 tornado hit southeastern Lima, Ohio as well as Beaverdam.

Several tornadic events took place internationally as the springtime activity in the United States approached dormancy during the summer. Several damaging tornadic events struck Europe in July and September, while another tornado injured seven people in Serangoon, Singapore at the beginning of November. The final major tornado event of the year took place in the United States when four tornadoes struck Illinois and Arkansas, killing three and injuring 28.

=== United States yearly total ===
Confirmed tornadoes by Fujita rating
FU	F0	F1	F2	F3	F4	F5	Total
6	13	84	75	33	12	0	223

== January ==
There were seven tornadoes confirmed in the US in January.

=== January 3 ===
FU	F0	F1	F2	F3	F4	F5
0	0	1	0	2	0	0

Three damaging tornadoes touched down in Missouri, Illinois, and Ohio, injuring seven people. The most damaging tornado struck the northern suburbs of St. Louis, Missouri and was rated F3. It destroyed 16 homes, severely damaged 30 others, and damaged vehicles, trees, power lines, an oil refinery, and other structures and goods. It caused $2.75 million in damage and injured three people. The same storm dropped another intense F3 tornado in that obliterated four homes and numerous barns, and damaged at least four other homes, injuring three more. (the CDNS report did not list any injuries) The F1 tornado briefly touched down in northern Van Wert, Ohio, uprooting trees, leveling small buildings, and ripping roofs off of large buildings, injuring one person. (the CDNS report does not list an injury) These were the first tornadoes to be put in the database.

=== January 13 ===
The first killer tornado in the database struck north of Vandervoort in Polk County, Arkansas. The brief, but strong F3 tornado destroyed a house and it's furnishings, killing one person and injuring another.

== February ==
There were 20 tornadoes confirmed in the US in February.

=== February 11–13 ===
FU	F0	F1	F2	F3	F4	F5
0	0	5	10	3	1	0

The first tornado outbreak to be documented in the new tornado database, this deadly series of intense tornadoes struck areas from the Gulf Coast into the Ohio Valley. The strongest event was an F4 tornado that tore an 82.6-mile-path (132.9 km) near Shreveport, Louisiana, although further analysis concluded that this was likely a tornado family. Regardless, at least 18 people were killed, while 77 others were injured. Overall, at least 19 tornadoes touched down, killing at least 45 and injuring at least 201 others.

== March ==
There were 21 tornadoes confirmed in the US in March.

=== March 26–27 ===
FU	F0	F1	F2	F3	F4	F5
0	0	4	10	2	0	0

An outbreak of 16 tornadoes struck the Mississippi Valley. On March 26, an F3 tornado in Izard County, Arkansas injured one. Later, a large F2 tornado moved directly through Downtown Little Rock, injuring seven. After that, a massive, mile wide F3 tornado moved through Prairie County, Arkansas, injuring 20. The next day, a brief, but fatal F2 tornado struck areas south-southwest of Belzoni, Mississippi, killing one and injuring two. Later, back-to-back F2 tornadoes moved directly through Jackson, Mississippi, injuring seven and six respectively. Overall, the tornadoes injured 52 and killed one.

== April ==
There were 15 tornadoes confirmed in the US in April.

=== April 2–3 ===
FU	F0	F1	F2	F3	F4	F5
0	0	2	1	1	0	0

An F3 tornado struck northwest of Tuckerman, Arkansas. One home was completely destroyed, another one was unroofed, and five barns, a hay shed, two garages, and 10 tons of hay were destroyed. One person was killed and eight others were injured. Three additional tornadoes touched down in Arkansas and Oklahoma with no additional casualties.

=== April 18 ===
FU	F0	F1	F2	F3	F4	F5
0	0	0	1	1	0	0

An F3 tornado moved through the northwestern suburbs of Mobile, Alabama, damaging or destroying several homes and other buildings and injuring 15. An additional F2 tornado struck near Spanish Fort and Blakeley, Alabama, damaging trees, buildings, and homes with no casualties.

=== April 28–29 ===
FU	F0	F1	F2	F3	F4	F5
0	0	2	2	1	2	0

An intense outbreak of seven tornadoes struck Oklahoma, Kansas, Texas, and Mississippi. The three strongest tornadoes all occurred on April 28 and caused all the casualties. A long-tracked F3 tornado touched down in the Quartz Mountain National Park on the shore of Lake Altus-Lugert in Oklahoma. It then moved north-northeast through Lugert and the east side of Lone Wolf, before turning due-north and striking Cambridge and the west side Sentinel, causing major damage, injuring one and killing another. Later, a short-lived, but violent F4 tornado hit the north side of Clyde, Texas, killing five and injuring another five. The worst event was another violent F4 tornado that touched down southwest of Holdenville, Oklahoma before moving directly through it. Five people were killed and 32 others were injured. Overall, the outbreak killed 11 and injured 38.

== May ==
There were 61 tornadoes confirmed in the US in May.

=== May 1–2 ===
FU	F0	F1	F2	F3	F4	F5
0	1	6	2	0	0	0

An outbreak of nine tornadoes hit Louisiana and Mississippi. On May 1, an F2 tornado moved through Cloutierville, Louisiana in Natchitoches Parish, demolishing a school and destroying other buildings, trees, and crops. Seven students were injured inside the school. On May 2, another F2 tornado near Archie, Louisiana in Catahoula Parish damaged or destroyed 71 homes and 32 other buildings, killing one person and injuring five others. Overall, the tornadoes killed one and injured 15.

=== May 4–5 ===
FU	F0	F1	F2	F3	F4	F5
0	0	3	3	1	1	0

An outbreak of eight tornadoes impacted Kansas, Texas, Iowa, and Oklahoma. On May 4, a fatal F2 tornado tore directly through Downtown Perryton, Texas, destroying several homes and a warehouse, killing one and injuring 13. That night, a long-tracked, violent F4 tornado struck Zook, Kansas before tracking over open country and hitting Dundee and the Great Bend Municipal Airport outside of Great Bend. It destroyed 11 homes in Zook with near-F5 damage recorded at two homes while also striking another housing development northwest of Great Bend. One person was injured by this tornado. Overnight, a large, .25 miles (0.40 km) wide F3 tornado moved through rural Jackson and Brown counties before striking Hiawatha. It destroyed two homes and 123 barns while also damaging nine homes and eight barns north of Whiting near the beginning of its path, injuring 12. Overall, the eight hour outbreak killed one and injured 26.

=== May 21 (United Kingdom) ===
FU	F0	F1	F2	F3	F4	F5
0	0	3	1	0	0	0

An outbreak of four tornadoes struck the United Kingdom.

== June ==
There were 28 tornadoes confirmed in the US in June.

=== June 3 ===
An isolated, but strong F3 tornado struck rural areas northwest of Kosciusko, Mississippi, destroying a home and six other buildings and damaging five other buildings. Two people were killed and one other person was injured.

=== June 8–9 ===
FU	F0	F1	F2	F3	F4	F5
0	0	2	0	0	1	0

On June 8, an isolated, but large, violent F4 tornado formed within a squall line and hit the south side of McPherson, Kansas, destroying buildings, trees, and power lines, killing one, and injuring five. Two F1 tornadoes touched down in Missouri and Oklahoma the next day, causing no additional casualties.

=== June 13–16 ===
FU	F0	F1	F2	F3	F4	F5
0	0	4	2	3	0	0

Over the course of four days, nine tornadoes struck eight states. On June 13, an F2 tornado near Center, Nebraska killing livestock and injuring 101 people (the CDNS report only list one injury). Overall, 110 people were injured during this period, although there were no fatalities.

=== June 25 ===
FU	F0	F1	F2	F3	F4	F5
0	2	1	2	1	1	0

An outbreak of five tornadoes struck Wisconsin. An F2 tornado struck Colby, destroying three barns and killing one person. At the same time, a violent, .5-mile-wide (0.80 km) F4 tornado leveled vacation homes near Crescent Lake before moving directly through Rhinelander, damaging or destroying 12 homes. Two people drowned when the tornado overturned their boat and 12 others were injured. Two additional non-fatal F0 tornadoes also touched down in Kansas. Overall, the tornadoes killed three and injured 12.

== July ==
There were 23 tornadoes confirmed in the US in July.

=== July 15–16 ===
FU	F0	F1	F2	F3	F4	F5
0	0	1	0	0	1	0

On July 15, an isolated, but large, violent F4 tornado struck areas north of Uehling, Nebraska, destroying farm buildings, farm houses, a schoolhouse and killing hogs. 33 people were injured. The next day, an F1 tornado damaged two barns, blew down trees and a windmill, and unroofed a house in Dwight, Illinois, although no casualties occurred.

=== July 18–19 ===
FU	F0	F1	F2	F3	F4	F5
0	0	3	2	1	0	0

A cluster of six tornadoes struck areas from the Midwest to the Ohio Valley. The only tornado to cause casualties occurred on July 19, when an F3 tornado hit Southeastern Lima, Ohio as well as Beaverdam. It destroyed three homes and a drive-in theater and damaged hundreds of other homes and three industrial plants. A total of 30 people were injured.

=== July 23 (Germany) ===
A brief, but destructive F2 tornado passed near Borod, Rhineland-Palatinate, Germany. It ripped off the roofs, including rafters and boards, of some homes while removing all the tiles off of many others homes. Large trees were uprooted as well.

== August ==
There were 13 tornadoes confirmed in the US in August.

=== August 7 (Germany) ===
FU	F0	F1	F2	F3	F4	F5
1	0	1	0	0	0	0

A tornado, which was estimated to be of F3 or F4 intensity, struck Andernach, Rhineland-Palatinate, Germany, snapping large trees, knocking down utility poles, causing considerable damage to a chicken farm, and tore beets out of a field. An F1/T2 tornado was also observed in Denkiehausen, Lower Saxony, Germany.

=== August 23 (Netherlands) ===
FU	F0	F1	F2	F3	F4	F5
1	0	0	0	1	0	0

Two tornadoes were confirmed in the Netherlands. The first one, which was unrated, was observed in Kootwijk, Gelderland and tracked 14 km (8.7 mi). The second one, which was rated F3/T6, caused considerable damage near Haulerwijk, Friesland. At least one brick home had all its walls knocked down.

== September ==
There were three tornadoes confirmed in the US in September.

== October ==
There were two tornadoes confirmed in the US in October.

== November ==
There were four tornadoes confirmed in the US in November.

=== November 2 (Singapore) ===
A tornado struck Serangoon, Singapore, injuring seven people.

=== November 4 ===
An F3 tornado skipped from the Neighborville-Reamstown area to Adamstown, along with a brief reappearance near Tuckerton. While the tornado was in Adamstown, it caused major damage. The tornado threw a woman 30 feet (9.1 m) with part of a building. She escaped and lived, only with cuts and bruises. At least 14 buildings were damaged by the tornado, but one house and two barns were completely destroyed. Others had walls blown out and roofs torn off. Several corn fields were flattened. When the tornado arrived at Tuckerton, it shook a stone house, ripped part of a barn roof off, and blew over chicken houses and turkey pens. There was also damage to trees, and flying debris got tangled, and in some cases, cut phone and power lines. Two warehouses were shifted and almost collapsed, causing other buildings and electrical supplies to be damaged by water due to broken pipes. Despite the heavy damage, Grazulis rated the tornado F2.

== December ==
There were four tornadoes confirmed in the US in December.

=== December 2 ===
FU	F0	F1	F2	F3	F4	F5
0	0	1	1	2	0	0

All four December tornadoes touched down on this day in the form of a deadly tornado outbreak that struck Illinois and Arkansas. First, a long-tracked F2 tornado struck Dorsey, White City, and Mt. Olive, Illinois, killing one and injuring three when a car was tossed 600 ft (180 m) from a road. The second tornado was the deadliest; a long-tracked F3 tornado moved through Highland, Pocahontas, Stubblefield, and Greenville, Illinois, damaging or destroying 100 homes, damaging communication and power lines, killing two, and injuring 25. An additional F3 tornado that passed east of Franklin, Arkansas damaged or destroyed two houses, barns, and chicken houses. An F1 tornado also passed north of Sparta, Illinois near Tilden and heavily damaging several farms and buildings and equipment at an abandoned coal mine. Both of these tornadoes caused no additional casualties. Overall, the four tornadoes killed three people and injured 28 others.

== See also ==
- Tornado
  - Tornadoes by year
  - Tornado records
  - Tornado climatology
  - Tornado myths
- List of tornado outbreaks
  - List of F5 and EF5 tornadoes
  - List of North American tornadoes and tornado outbreaks
  - List of 21st-century Canadian tornadoes and tornado outbreaks
  - List of European tornadoes and tornado outbreaks
  - List of tornadoes and tornado outbreaks in Asia
  - List of Southern Hemisphere tornadoes and tornado outbreaks
  - List of tornadoes striking downtown areas
  - List of tornadoes with confirmed satellite tornadoes
- Tornado intensity
  - Fujita scale
  - Enhanced Fujita scale

== Bibliography ==
- Grazulis, Thomas (1993). Significant Tornadoes 1680-1991: A Chronology and Analysis of Events. St. Johnsbury, Vermont: Environmental Films. ISBN 1-879362-03-1.
