= Tornado outbreak of March 26–27, 1950 =

Weather event in the United States

Meteorological history
- Formed: March 26, 1950
- Dissipated: March 27, 1950

Tornado outbreak
- Tornadoes: 16
- Max. rating: F3 tornado
- Duration: 1 day and 21 hours
- Highest gusts: 85 mph (137 km/h)
- Lowest temp: ~0 °F (−18 °C)
- Largest hail: 1.25 in (3.2 cm)
- Max. snowfall: 20 in (51 cm)

Overall effects
- Fatalities: 1 (+4 non-tornadic)
- Injuries: 52 (+5 non-tornadic)
- Damage: $1.883 million (1950 USD) $25.2 million (2025 USD)
- Areas affected: Mississippi Valley
- Part of the tornado outbreaks of 1950

An intense outbreak produced 16 destructive tornadoes across the Mississippi Valley on March 26-27, 1950. A total of 12 significant (F2+) tornadoes touched down, including three that hit Little Rock, Arkansas and Jackson, Mississippi. Overall, there was one fatality, 52 injuries, and $1.883 million in damage from the outbreak. Two additional deaths occurred due to severe thunderstorm winds as well.

== Meteorological synopsis ==
A low-pressure that had formed in Colorado on March 25 moved eastward and then moved slowly northeastward into Great Lakes region. A cold front extending back through the already favorable conditions in the Mississippi Valley sparked multiple severe and tornadic thunderstorms that moved generally eastward.

== Confirmed tornadoes ==
Confirmed tornadoes by Fujita rating
FU	F0	F1	F2	F3	F4	F5	Total
0	0	4	10	2	0	0	16

- Note: The Climatological Data National Summary and/or Thomas P. Grazulis reported some additional tornadoes that were not counted toward the final total:

March 26

- A tornado moved directly through Ellsinore, Missouri, damaging homes in the town.

March 27

- An F2 tornado destroyed tenant homes and barns just north of Manila, Arkansas. A related tornado may have also injured two people at Joiner.

=== March 26 event ===
List of confirmed tornadoes – Sunday, March 26, 1950 (Note: All dates are based on the local time zone where the tornado touched down; however, all times are in Coordinated Universal Time and dates are split at midnight CST/CDT for consistency.) (Note: Prior to 1994, only the average widths of tornado paths were officially listed.)
F#	Location	County / Parish	State	Start Coord.	Time (UTC)	Path length	Max width	Summary
F2	Western Arkadelphia to Southern Midway to SE of Social Hill	Clark, Hot Spring	AR	34.12°N 93.07°W	01:30–?	17.4 mi (28.0 km)	150 yd (140 m)	This tornado touched down on the west side of Arkadelphia and moved northeastward along the Ouachita River, hitting the south side of Midway before dissipating. Three homes and 13 farm buildings were destroyed while six homes and 16 other buildings were damaged. Some livestock were killed as well. Damages were estimated at $50,000 and three people were injured.
F3	ESE of Violet Hill to S of Horseshoe Bend	Izard	AR	36.15°N 91.83°W	01:31–?	5.7 mi (9.2 km)	200 yd (180 m)	An intense tornado destroyed or damaged a church, a few stores, a large consolidated school building, 30 homes, and many barns. Two of the homes were unroofed as well. Damages were estimated at $250,000 and one person was injured. Tornado researcher Thomas P. Grazulis classified the tornado as an F2.
F2	Meadowcliff to Little Rock to W of Booker	Pulaski	AR	34.70°N 92.35°W	02:30–?	10.4 mi (16.7 km)	600 yd (550 m)	This strong tornado first touched down on the southwest side of Little Rock in Meadowcliff and passed through Geyer Springs. A drive-in theater screen was damaged and two cars in the theater lot were overturned, injuring five people. The tornado then progressed northeastward and struck the residential district, causing considerable damage to roofs before striking the business district of Downtown Little Rock. There was extensive damage to roofs, windows, plate glass, signs, and brick and masonry parapets. A large radio antenna mast toppled from roof of the Gazette Building. The tornado then crossed the Arkansas River into North Little Rock, where it did considerable damage to roofs, trees and signs, and injured two more people. The tornado weakened after that, causing slight crop damage before dissipating west of Booker. Seven people were injured and losses totaled $250,000. Considerable water damage by rain entering buildings through torn roofs and broken windows also occurred as a result of this tornado. Some small hail was also observed as well.
F3	S of Hickory Plains to E of Jasmine	Prairie, White	AR	34.98°N 91.73°W	03:15–?	14.9 mi (24.0 km)	1,760 yd (1,610 m)	This massive, mile-wide tornado accompanied by moderate hail likely came from the same storm that produced the Little Rock tornado. Timber, farm buildings, farm equipment, and 33 homes were heavily damaged or destroyed and livestock was injured. Minimal crop damage also occurred. Damages were estimated at $250,000 and 20 people were injured. The CDNS report list 15 injuries. Grazulis listed the tornado as an F2.
F2	McClelland/Kramer to Gregory	Woodruff	AR	35.10°N 91.40°W	05:30–?	5.4 mi (8.7 km)	833 yd (762 m)	A strong tornado, which likely came from the same storm that produced the Little Rock and Hickory Plains tornadoes, occurred southeast of Georgetown. A total of seven to 10 homes were heavily damaged or destroyed, of which a few shifted and collapsed on their foundations, and several barns were destroyed as well. Two people were injured, but no damage value was given.

=== March 27 event ===
List of confirmed tornadoes – Monday, March 27, 1950
F#	Location	County / Parish	State	Start Coord.	Time (UTC)	Path length	Max width	Summary
F2	S of McAlester	Pittsburg	OK	34.85°N 95.75°W	09:00–?	0.1 mi (0.16 km)	77 yd (70 m)	A broom handle factory was obliterated by this funnel-less but strong, southeastward-moving tornado. Local residents were able to identify the damage as tornadic due to the pattern of the debris. Damages were estimated at $2,500. Grazulis did not list the tornado as an F2 or stronger.
F2	W of Belzoni	Humphreys	MS	33.17°N 90.55°W	11:00–?	0.1 mi (0.16 km)	33 yd (30 m)	1 death – A couple of barns and six tenant homes were destroyed while one large home was shifted on its foundation. Two people were injured.
F1	W of Grimes, LA to Transylvania, LA to W of Fitler, MS	East Carroll (LA), Issaquena (MS)	LA, MS	32.63°N 91.28°W	12:00–?	15.3 mi (24.6 km)	17 yd (16 m)	A total of 30 tenant homes and an unspecified number of barns were destroyed. Damages were estimated at $25,000 and two people were injured. Grazulis classified the tornado as an F2. This may have been the same tornado that struck Belzoni, Mississippi.
F2	N of Kosciusko to S of French Camp	Attala	MS	33.13°N 89.57°W	13:30–?	11.9 mi (19.2 km)	33 yd (30 m)	Barns were destroyed and a home was unroofed, although no damage estimate was given.
F2	Forest Hill to Downtown Jackson to SW of Sallis	Hinds, Rankin, Madison, Attala	MS	32.28°N 90.27°W	13:45–?	59.3 mi (95.4 km)	50 yd (46 m)	This was the first of two strong tornadoes to hit Downtown Jackson along similar beginning paths before diverging. It also struck Forest Hill, Bradie, Wells, Meltonville, Cameron and Truitt. Damages were estimated at $500,000 and seven people were injured. Grazulis did not list the tornado as an F2 or stronger.
F2	Forest Hill to Downtown Jackson to Pisgah	Hinds, Rankin	MS	32.28°N 90.27°W	13:45–?	31.9 mi (51.3 km)	50 yd (46 m)	This was the second of two strong tornadoes to hit Downtown Jackson along similar beginning paths before diverging. It also struck Forest Hill, Bradie, Flowood, Northern Wells, Luckney, and Pisgah. Damages were estimated at $500,000 and six people were injured. Grazulis did not list the tornado as an F2 or stronger.
F1	Wilson	East Feliciana	LA	30.92°N 91.13°W	14:30–?	0.5 mi (0.80 km)	27 yd (25 m)	Damages were estimated at $25,000. The tornado was not listed in the CDNS report.
F2	Abbott	Clay	MS	33.67°N 88.78°W	14:45–?	4.7 mi (7.6 km)	33 yd (30 m)	No damage estimate was given. Grazulis did not list the tornado as an F2 or stronger.
F1	W of Midway	Tishomingo	MS	34.73°N 88.27°W	17:00–?	0.1 mi (0.16 km)	10 yd (9.1 m)	A Masonic lodge, two churches, and 24 homes were unroofed, damaged, or destroyed. Damages were estimated at $25,000 and two people were injured. Grazulis classified the tornado as an F2.
F1	W of McMinnville	Warren	TN	35.68°N 85.77°W	21:00–?	0.2 mi (0.32 km)	7 yd (6.4 m)	A small tornado moved northeastward, damaging buildings, trees, and power and telephone lines. Losses totaled $2,500.
F2	Colfax to NNW of Anchor	McLean	IL	40.57°N 88.60°W	22:30–?	3.0 mi (4.8 km)	50 yd (46 m)	This strong tornado, which was described as having a "whitish" colored, funnel, destroyed several outbuildings on one farm and knocked down power lines. Damages were estimated at $2,500. Grazulis did not list the tornado as an F2 or stronger.

== Non-tornadic impacts ==
Severe thunderstorms impacted Missouri, Indiana, Illinois, and Southern Wisconsin, causing widespread hail, wind, and lightning damage and killing livestock. Princeton, Indiana saw a peak hailstone of 1.25 inches (3.2 cm) on March 26. In Kansas City, Missouri, two boys were killed when they were crushed to death by a falling tree. On March 27, severe thunderstorms struck the Southeast and two people were injured in wind damage instances of Concordia Parish, Louisiana. In Iberia Parish, the winds downed power lines and injured two people. A fatality also occurred when a person was electrocuted by a high voltage wire.

High winds blew soil and light snow across north-central and eastern Colorado between March 25–26, damaging small buildings and grain. Transportation was slowed or halted due to reduced visibility, especially across mountain passes, and multiple car accidents led to the death of one person as well as injuries of three others. Blizzard conditions also impacted all of North Dakota in between March 25-28 with accumulations reaching as high as 20 inches (51 cm) in southwestern and south-central portions of the state, making it one of the worst blizzards to hit the area. Moderate temperatures of around 30 °F at the start of the event on March 25 also led to a cold rain falling in some areas and Fargo saw its heaviest 24-hour rainfall amount ever recorded in March. Many stations across state also recorded record snowfall accumulations for March as well. Transportation stalled and numerous cars stalled in the heavy, wet snow with people taking refuge in them or even on stranger's farms. Some cattle was lost and feed stocks were isolated on some farms. One person died near Devils Lake due to heart failure while another person died attempting to look for help after his car stalled near Streeter. Temperatures across the state eventually bottomed out near 0 °F on March 28 after the storm ended the day prior.

March 26 also saw strong winds and blowing dust across Kansas with gusts of 50 mph (80 km/h) on the west side and 70 to 80 mph (110 to 130 km/h) on the east side. Highways were closed in numerous areas and there was crop and minor roof and property damage. Reduced visibilities led to vehicle accidents that killed five and injure many others.

== See also ==
- List of North American tornadoes and tornado outbreaks
