= Gill, Texas =

Unincorporated community in Texas, US

Coordinates: 32°23′35″N 94°20′28″W

Gill is a rural unincorporated community in south central Harrison County, Texas, United States. The community is six miles south of the county seat, Marshall, on U.S. Route 59.
