= Pine, Texas =

- Unincorporated community
- Location within Texas Location within the United States
- Coordinates: 32°54′47″N 94°58′10″W
- Country: United States
- State: Texas
- County: Camp
- Elevation: 397 ft (121 m)
- Time zone: UTC-6 (Central (CST))
  - Summer (DST): UTC-5 (CDT)
- Area codes: 903 & 430
- GNIS feature ID: 1378863

Pine is an unincorporated community in Camp County, in the U.S. state of Texas. According to the Handbook of Texas, the community had a population of 78 in 2000.

== Education ==
Pine had two schools in 1935 that taught 141 students. Since 1955, Pine has been served by the Pittsburg Independent School District.
