= Cottonwood, Coal County, Oklahoma =

Unincorporated community in Oklahoma, US

Cottonwood, Oklahoma
- Unincorporated community
- Location within the state of Oklahoma Cottonwood (the United States)
- Coordinates: 34°33′14″N 96°12′14″W
- Country: United States
- State: Oklahoma
- County: Coal
- Elevation: 584 ft (178 m)
- Time zone: UTC-6 (Central (CST))
  - Summer (DST): UTC-5 (CDT)
- GNIS feature ID: 2805312

Cottonwood is an unincorporated community in Coal County, Oklahoma, United States. It is located two miles northeast of Coalgate. A post office operated in Cottonwood from April 1, 1914 to December 31, 1914.
