= Tuscaloosa tornado =

Tuscaloosa tornado may refer to:

- 1997 Tuscaloosa tornado
- 2000 Tuscaloosa tornado
- 2011 Tuscaloosa–Birmingham tornado
