= Murfreesboro tornado =

Murfreesboro tornado may refer to several significant tornadoes affecting the town of Murfreesboro, Tennessee:

- The April 1974 tornado, during the 1974 Super Outbreak
- The Tornado outbreak of January 23–24, 1997
- The Tornado outbreak of April 27–28, 2002
- The Tornado outbreak of April 9–11, 2009 in Murfreesboro, Tennessee
