= 1997 Central Texas tornado outbreak =

Tornado outbreak in Texas

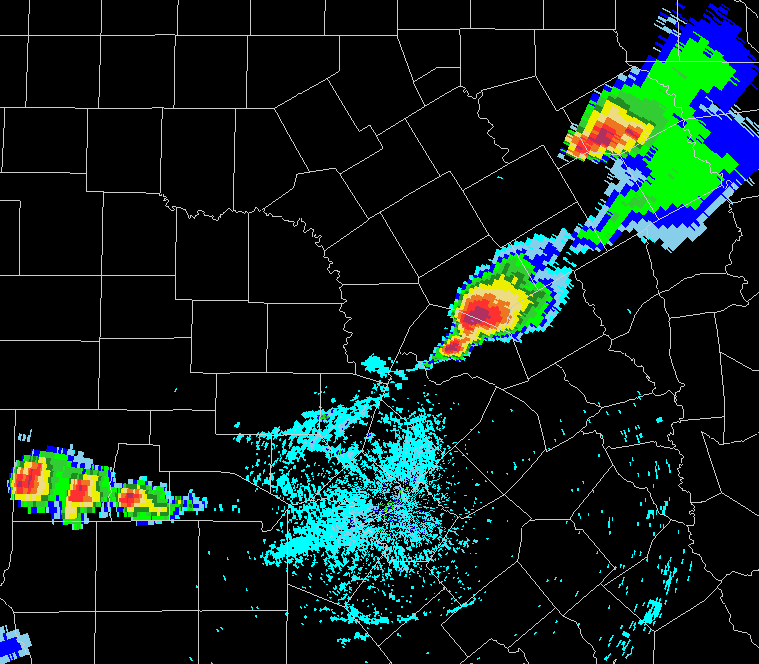
- Clockwise from top A traffic camera still of an F3 tornado near Moody as seen from I-35; An Albertsons grocery store in Cedar Park following an F3 tornado An aerial view of a home in Pedernales Valley after an F4 tornado Extreme tornado damage to trees and homes in the Double Creek Estates sub-division of Jarrell after an F5 tornado WSR-88D radar imagery of storms across Central Texas at 3:40 pm CDT (Note: All times in Central Daylight Time (UTC-5:00) unless otherwise noted.)

Meteorological history
- Date: May 27, 1997
- Duration: 7 hours, 2 minutes

Tornado outbreak
- Tornadoes: 20 confirmed
- Max. rating: F5 tornado
- Highest winds: Tornadic – >261 mph (420 km/h) (Jarrell F5 tornado); Non-tornadic – 122 mph (196 km/h) (Kelly Air Force Base, San Antonio, Texas, straight-line winds)
- Largest hail: 4.50 in (114 mm) (Bell and Falls counties)

Overall effects
- Fatalities: 28 (+2 indirect)
- Injuries: 33
- Damage: $126.6 million (1997 USD) (Note: All damage totals are in 1997 USD unless otherwise noted.)
- Areas affected: Central Texas
- Power outages: ≥ 81,000 electricity customers
- Part of the tornado outbreaks of 1997

A deadly tornado outbreak occurred in Central Texas during the afternoon and evening of May 27, 1997, in conjunction with a southwestward-moving cluster of supercell thunderstorms. These storms produced 20 tornadoes, mainly along the Interstate 35 corridor, from northeast of Waco to north of San Antonio. The strongest tornado was an F5 tornado that completely obliterated a residential subdivision along the northwestern outskirts of Jarrell, killing 27 people and injuring 12 others. Overall, 30 people were killed and 33 others were hospitalized due to the severe weather outbreak.

Although the atmospheric conditions enabling the event were forecast to be conducive for strong winds and large hail, forecasters did not initially anticipate as much of a risk of strong tornadoes due to the lack of substantial wind shear over the region. Instead, the coalescence of several weather features—including a cold front, a dry line, and a gravity wave—provided locally favorable conditions for rotating thunderstorms and the formation of tornadoes. This peculiar evolution led to the unusual southwestward motion of the storms and the tornadoes they produced.

A tornado watch was first issued at 12:54 p.m. on May 27 for portions of East Texas and western Louisiana; the first tornado touched down at 1:21 p.m. in McLennan County while the final tornado lifted at 8:23 p.m. later that day in Frio County. The 20 tornadoes collectively inflicted at least $126.6 million in damage. The F5 Jarrell tornado was the outbreak's most powerful and deadliest tornado. It destroyed most of the 38-home Double Creek Estates subdivision west of Jarrell where the most extreme damage occurred. Residences were completely dismantled, swept away, and reduced to concrete slabs, while trees in the area were completely shredded and debarked. Fields were scoured to a depth of 18 in (460 mm) and asphalt was torn from roads. Due to the tornado's intensity, the debris was often small in size and beyond recognition. There were four other tornadoes rated F3 or higher. One F3 tornado moved across Cedar Park, damaging parts of the business district and numerous homes in nearby neighborhoods. An F4 tornado struck areas near Lake Travis and caused one fatality. In addition to the tornadoes, the storms also produced large hail and strong straight-line winds; Kelly Air Force Base in San Antonio recorded a 122 mph (196 km/h) wind gust.

== Meteorological synopsis ==
=== Atmospheric setup ===
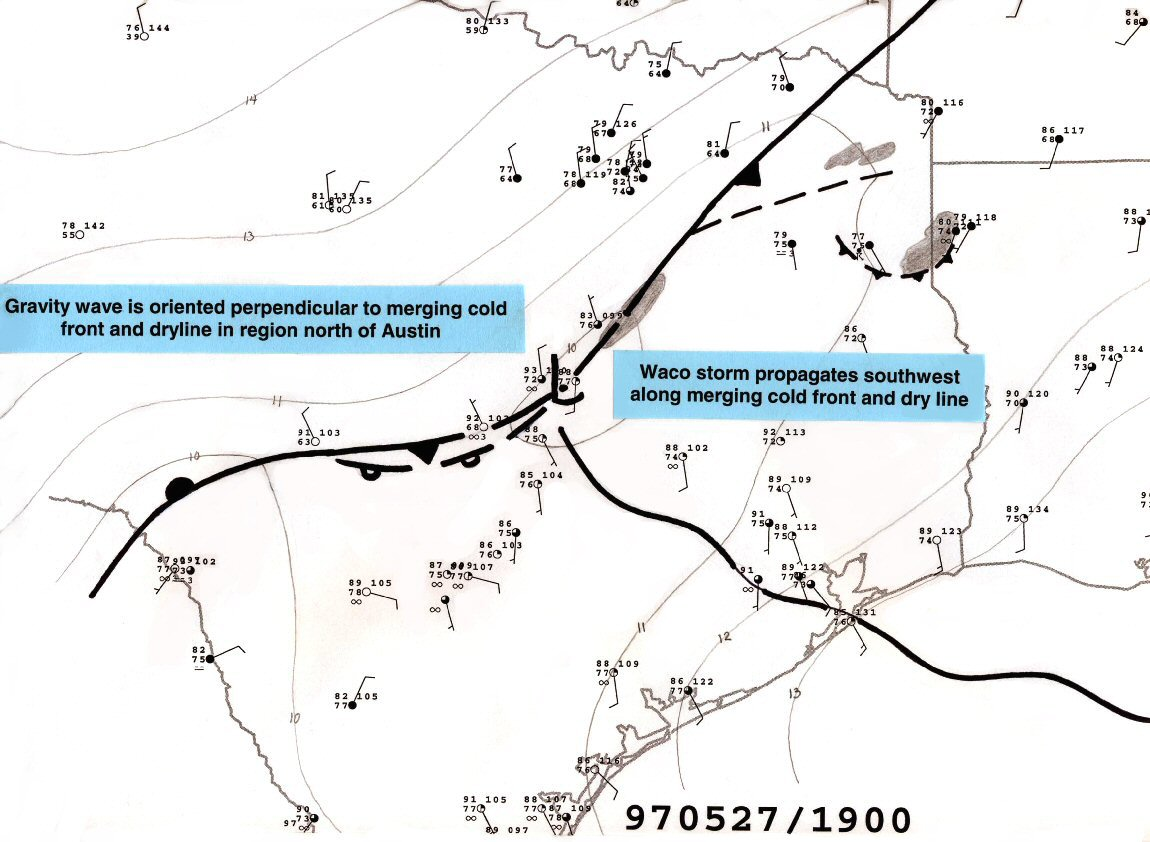
A surface weather analysis of Texas at 2:00 p.m. on May 27 showing the cold front (solid line with pennants), dry line (dashed line with semicircles), gravity wave (solid line), and low-pressure area (L symbol). The alignment of these features produced the local environmental conditions enabling the tornado outbreak.

The severity of the 1997 Central Texas tornado outbreak was predicated on an unusual spatial and temporal alignment of weather features at highly localized scales. The broader environment was not particularly anomalous for the late springtime over Central and East Texas. Unlike conventional tornado outbreaks in Texas, the 1997 outbreak was not associated with a strong trough of low pressure and strong density gradients in the lower troposphere. Instead, the most prominent weather system over the central U.S. at the time was a distant upper-level low centered over Nebraska imparting little influence on atmospheric conditions over Texas.

Consequently, winds in the mid-levels of the troposphere over Texas on May 27 were weak and westerly, ranging from 30 kn (35 mph; 56 km/h) over North Texas to below 15 kn (17 mph; 28 km/h) over Central and South Texas. Winds closer to the surface were also quiescent; the average storm-relative winds within the lowest 6 km (3.7 mi) of the atmosphere as measured in Del Rio, Texas, prior to the onset of storm development was only 6 kn (6.9 mph; 11 km/h). Further aloft at the level of the jet stream, there were two nearby wind speed maxima over northern Mexico and the central Mississippi Valley; this led to strong divergence of air over Texas. (Note: The divergence of air at the upper-levels of the troposphere promotes upward motion and aids thunderstorm development.) Wind shear was negligible within the lowest 6 km (3.7 mi) of the atmosphere contrary to typical tornado outbreaks. (Note: Wind shear—a change of wind velocities with height—is necessary to produce rotating thunderstorms, making it a key physical condition for the development of tornadoes.)

Despite generally meager winds, the atmosphere was nonetheless thermally energetic. The combination of several days of onshore wind flow from the Gulf of Mexico and the persistence of a capping inversion aloft led to an accumulation of moist air over the state. Dew points soon exceeded 70 °F (21 °C) within the boundary layer, representing ample moisture in the lower levels of the troposphere. Radiosondes launched from Corpus Christi and Fort Worth on the morning of May 27 detected the presence of a robust "elevated mixed layer" of air aloft characterized by steep lapse rates—the change of temperature with height—near the dry adiabatic lapse rate. This contributed to high convective available potential energy (CAPE) exceeding 5,500 J/kg across most of Central and East Texas, denoting a highly unstable atmosphere. (Note: Environments with thunderstorms often exhibit CAPE exceeding 1,000 J/kg, with extreme cases exhibiting CAPE greater than 5,000 J/kg.) In some cases CAPE was as high as 6,500 J/kg. The lack of fronts moving across Texas in the 36 hours before the tornado outbreak allowed this instability to remain and spread across much of the state.

Although these conditions were regionally conducive to the development of thunderstorms capable of producing large hail and strong winds, the potential for supercell and tornado development was not initially clear given the lack of wind shear. Other metrics and indices used to diagnose tornado potential, such as the Energy Helicity Index, storm-relative helicity, supercell composite parameter, and the significant tornado parameter, were also lower than historically observed environments featuring tornadoes. For instance, the amount of storm-relative helicity within the lowest 3 km (1.9 mi) of the atmosphere—a common measure quantifying the amount of wind shear—was measured as 70 m^{2}/s^{2} at Corpus Christi and reached 117 m^{2}/s^{2} according to data from the Rapid Update Cycle computer model; values below 300 m^{2}/s^{2} are correlated with weak tornadoes. A study published in Monthly Weather Review in 2007 described the environment as being "marginally favorable for supercells and unfavorable for significant, supercellular tornadoes."

Instead, the factors that enabled the eventual tornado outbreak may have transpired at a mesoscale involving several features becoming juxtaposed over Texas. The dry line delineating the boundary between the moist maritime air mass over East Texas and the drier continental air mass farther west remained nearly stationary in the region through the morning of May 27. On the preceding evening, a mesoscale convective system developing along this dry line over eastern Oklahoma and Arkansas generated a well-defined gravity wave that traveled southwest across East Texas on the morning of May 27. Its progression was evidenced on satellite imagery as an advancing band of mid-level cumuli. A weak low-pressure area also developed along the dry line near Dallas and tracked southwest along the boundary. In the two days before May 27, a cold front associated with the upper-level low over Nebraska had swept slowly southeast across the central U.S. Prior to dawn on May 27, the front progressed across West Texas; by 7:00 a.m. on May 27, the front spanned from southeastern Oklahoma through the northwestern portion of the Dallas–Fort Worth metroplex southwestwards to near the Big Bend of Texas. This placed the cold front parallel and just to the west of the dry line along a northeast to southwest orientation. A swath of clear skies emerged between the two boundaries, maximizing surface heating during the daytime and contributing to the weak low-pressure area's southwestward movement through Central Texas.

=== Development of storms ===
Animation of storms developing over Texas on May 27. The animation alternates between progressing forwards and backwards in time.

At around 12:30 p.m., the gravity wave, cold front, dry line, and low-pressure area overlapped near Waco, Texas, with the faster cold front overtaking and merging with the nearly stationary dry line. The cold front and dry line were brought together in a northeast to southwest fashion resembling a zipper. Thunderstorms formed near Waco in tandem with this juxtaposition of features and within a local maximum of surface heating and convergence of moist air. While some storms had spawned along the cold front, the gravity wave's passage in the early afternoon hours coincided with a rapid intensification of the first thunderstorms. The arrival of the gravity wave and its perpendicular alignment relative to the orientation of the cold front and dry line may have enhanced wind shear locally despite weak wind shear at a broader, synoptic scale. This allowed the thunderstorms to rotate and become supercells.

However, the degree to which the wave contributed to the formation of supercells and eventually tornadoes remains a subject of disagreement among meteorologists. The development of new discrete supercells followed the advancing intersection of the cold front and dry line and the gravity wave as they continued southwest, though each individual storm was nearly stationary. Due to the westerly winds in the mid-levels of the troposphere, the outflow from each developing storm was directed east, allowing each new thunderstorm to develop and rotate without interference from the initial storms. The direction of the storms' expansion towards the southwest deviated over 100 degrees away from these westerly winds, representing an extreme and highly unusual motion. The southwestward generation of storms brought them towards increasingly unstable air with higher CAPE, allowing the storms to acquire strong inflow and the requisite rotation to produce tornadoes.

There were at least three families of thunderstorms that developed as part of the initial southwestward-moving complex of storms, composed of at least 16 distinct supercells; six of the cells formed along the cold front, five formed along the dry line, and five formed along the gust front imparted by previous storms. The gust fronts pushed outwards by the downdrafts of the thunderstorms served as foci for tornadogenesis; boundaries like gust fronts can provide low-level vorticity and rising air necessary for the formation of tornadoes. Some of the day's tornadoes were spun up by the gust front itself while others spawned from thunderstorms with preexisting mesocyclones aloft enhanced by the gust front underneath.

The day's first thunderstorm near Waco in McLennan County strengthened quickly in response to the highly unstable atmosphere. A severe thunderstorm warning—the first of the day—was issued for the county at 12:50 p.m. Weather radars showed increasing rotation within the storm, prompting the issuance of a tornado warning at 1:21 p.m. This storm produced the outbreak's first tornado 5 mi (8.0 km) southwest of Hewitt near Lorena. The same storm produced a second brief tornado near Bruceville followed by a third, intense F3 tornado in southwestern McLennan County that lasted for 20 minutes. A new thunderstorm developed along the flanking line associated with the first storm. This second storm spawned several tornadoes as it expanded towards the southwest, including an F3 tornado near Lake Belton beginning at 2:25 p.m. and the F5 Jarrell tornado beginning at 3:25 p.m. The NEXRAD radar in Granger used to monitor this storm suffered a power failure and went out of commission at 3:38 p.m. A control switch left in an improper position on a prior maintenance visit prevented its emergency power supply from activating. Thunderstorms developing to the southwest later in the afternoon and evening produced additional tornadoes, including the F3 tornado that struck Cedar Park and the F4 tornado that struck Lakeway. The Lakeway tornado was the first instance of an F4 tornado striking Travis County on record. The final tornado of the day touched down in Frio County and lifted at 7:23 p.m.

Farther south away from the southwestward-moving storm cluster, the cold front and dry line curved west, making them parallel to the advancing gravity wave; this triggered the development of numerous and intense storms between Austin and the Big Bend after 3:00 p.m. when the gravity wave intersected the front. The parallel orientations of the wave and the other boundaries precluded these storms' rotation. They tracked east and eventually merged with the southwestward-propagating complex of tornadic storms along the Pedernales River. This coalescence produced a south- and southeastward-moving squall line and ended the strong tornado activity. Nonetheless, strong and damaging winds were produced by the squall line for several hours. Kelly Air Force Base in San Antonio documented a wind gust of 106 kn (122 mph; 196 km/h), marking a record high wind velocity for the site.

== Warnings and preparedness ==
The Storm Prediction Center (SPC) forecasted a moderate risk for severe thunderstorms over parts of East Texas in its severe weather outlook issued at 1:03 a.m. on May 27. The moderate risk region included Waco, the Killeen–Temple–Fort Hood metropolitan area, and extended east towards Shreveport, Louisiana, and Fort Polk, Louisiana. Austin was located at the boundary between the moderate risk region and the slight risk region that encompassed most of East and South Texas, including the Hill Country. The SPC predicted that the gravity wave would be a focal point for storms capable of producing large hail and damaging winds given the unstable atmosphere. A subsequent outlook issued by the SPC at 10:16 a.m. continued to indicate a moderate risk for severe weather and mentioned the possibility of isolated and brief tornadoes. A tornado watch was later issued by the SPC at 12:54 p.m. for parts of eastern Texas and western Louisiana, citing the unstable airmass in place over the region. The Dallas/Fort Worth and Austin/San Antonio National Weather Service forecast offices also issued bulletins on the morning of May 27 noting the potential for severe weather. However, these early outlooks focused more on the threat of wind and hail rather than tornadoes due to the low wind shear present over the region.

The Dallas/Fort Worth National Weather Service forecast office ultimately issued 10 tornado warnings and 5 severe thunderstorm warnings between 1 and 5 p.m. on May 27. The Austin/San Antonio office issued 8 tornado warnings, 24 severe thunderstorm warnings, and 10 flash flood warnings during the afternoon and evening of May 27, with 80 percent of their issued products occurring after 5 p.m. in connection with the widespread storms that developed later in the day separate from the initial tornadic storms. In one case, a media outlet's decision to manually activate the Emergency Alert System rather than allow weather warnings to automatically trigger it resulted in a 25–30 minute delay in the dissemination of a warning. Interviews conducted by a National Oceanic and Atmospheric Administration service assessment team found that many watched the approach of tornadoes prior to taking shelter due to their slow movement and high visibility. In the case of the F5 Jarrell tornado, some fled while others took shelter. Due to the strength of the tornado, some who stayed behind were killed despite taking appropriate safety measures.

== Confirmed tornadoes ==
Confirmed tornadoes by Fujita rating
FU	F0	F1	F2	F3	F4	F5	Total
0	6	6	3	3	1	1	20

List of confirmed tornadoes – Tuesday, May 27, 1997 (Note: All dates are based on Central Daylight Time (UTC-05:00); however, all times are in Coordinated Universal Time for consistency.)
F#	Location	County	Start Coord.	Time (UTC)	Path length	Max width	Damage	Summary
F2	W of Lorena	McLennan	31.38°N 97.32°W	18:21 – 18:33	2 mi (3.2 km)	75 yd (69 m)	$75,000	Several large trees were uprooted and a mobile home was destroyed.
F0	Eddy area	McLennan	31.30°N 97.25°W	18:44 – 18:47	0.2 mi (0.32 km)	40 yd (37 m)	—N/a	Tornado reported by a sheriff deputy caused no damage.
F3	E of Moody	McLennan, Bell	31.27°N 97.35°W	18:46 – 18:59	3.7 mi (6.0 km)	150 yd (140 m)	$150,000	Most of the tornado's path occurred in McLennan County. A home and a barn were destroyed on Dowell Road after the tornado initially touched down in open terrain near Farm to Market Road 107; these structures received F3 tornado damage. Another home nearby was also damaged and a pickup truck and car were displaced by several hundred feet. The tornado moved south-southwest, crossing the border between McLennan and Bell counties and traversing open country. There, numerous trees were uprooted. A local news station also captured this tornado and much of its life cycle as it passed within a few miles of their skycam and station.
F0	WNW of Belton	Bell	31.08°N 97.53°W	19:16 – 19:27	0.2 mi (0.32 km)	50 yd (46 m)	—N/a	Weak tornado remained stationary for much of its existence before dissipating.
F3	N of Belton	Bell	31.17°N 97.47°W	19:27 – 19:45	1.4 mi (2.3 km)	275 yd (251 m)	$900,000	The tornado began on the northern shores of Lake Belton at Morgan's Point Resort. A marina was destroyed on the lake's northern shores, leading to the capsizing of 100 boats. Ten homes along the same shore sustained severe damage and trees were destroyed. The tornado then crossed the lake and moved ashore northeast of the community of Woodland, downing many trees and causing heavy damage to at least six structures. The tornado was on the ground for a third of a mile after traversing the lake before lifting.
F1	SW of Belton	Bell	31.02°N 97.53°W	19:50 – 19:58	0.2 mi (0.32 km)	40 yd (37 m)	—N/a	Brief tornado with unknown damage.
F1	Blooming Grove area	Navarro	32.10°N 96.72°W	20:05 – 20:10	0.5 mi (0.80 km)	50 yd (46 m)	—N/a	Brief tornado uprooted several large trees.
F1	NW of Prairie Dell	Bell	30.90°N 97.58°W	20:07 – 20:25	2.4 mi (3.9 km)	100 yd (91 m)	$20,000	Initially stationary tornado that began to quickly track towards the south-southwest, destroying trees and damaging several structures.
F2	N of Jarrell	Williamson	30.8848°N 97.594°W	20:25 – 20:33	2 mi (3.2 km)	200 yd (180 m)	—N/a	First of two tornadoes that preceded the Jarrell F5 tornado.
F2	NW of Jarrell	Williamson	30.868°N 97.603°W	20:35 – 20:39	0.5 mi (0.80 km)	150 yd (140 m)	—N/a	Second of two tornadoes that preceded the Jarrell F5 tornado; classified as a multi-vortex tornado.
F1	S of Dawson	Navarro	31.87°N 96.72°W	20:36 – 20:40	0.5 mi (0.80 km)	50 yd (46 m)	—N/a	Brief tornado uprooted large trees.
F5	W of Jarrell	Williamson	30.84°N 97.618°W	20:40 – 20:53	5.1 mi (8.2 km)	1,320 yd (1,210 m)	$40.1 million	27 deaths – See article on this tornado – 12 others were injured.
F0	SW of Hubbard	Hill	31.82°N 96.83°W	20:50 – 20:53	0.2 mi (0.32 km)	40 yd (37 m)	—N/a	Brief tornado caused no damage.
F3	Cedar Park	Williamson, Travis	30.55°N 97.82°W	21:05 – 21:15	9.2 mi (14.8 km)	200 yd (180 m)	$70.11 million	See section on this tornado – 15 people were injured by this tornado.
F1	NW of Four Points	Travis	30.40°N 97.85°W	21:15 – 21:15	0.2 mi (0.32 km)	20 yd (18 m)	$5,000	Brief tornado with minimal damage.
F4	W of Lakeway	Travis	30.37°N 98.02°W	21:50 – ?	5.6 mi (9.0 km)	440 yd (400 m)	$15 million	1 death – See section on this tornado – 5 others were injured.
F1	N of Kyle	Hays	30.02°N 97.87°W	22:38 – 22:45	3.5 mi (5.6 km)	60 yd (55 m)	$5,000	Trees and power lines were knocked over.
F0	S of Utopia	Uvalde	29.52°N 99.53°W	00:00 – 00:03	0.2 mi (0.32 km)	20 yd (18 m)	—N/a	Tornado remained over open country.
F0	NW of Sisterdale	Kendall	29.98°N 98.75°W	00:30 – 00:32	0.7 mi (1.1 km)	30 yd (27 m)	—N/a	Tornado remained over open country.
F0	NE of Moore	Frio	29.07°N 99.00°W	01:20 – 01:23	1 mi (1.6 km)	40 yd (37 m)	—N/a	Tornado remained over open country.

=== Jarrell, Texas ===
Jarrell, Texas
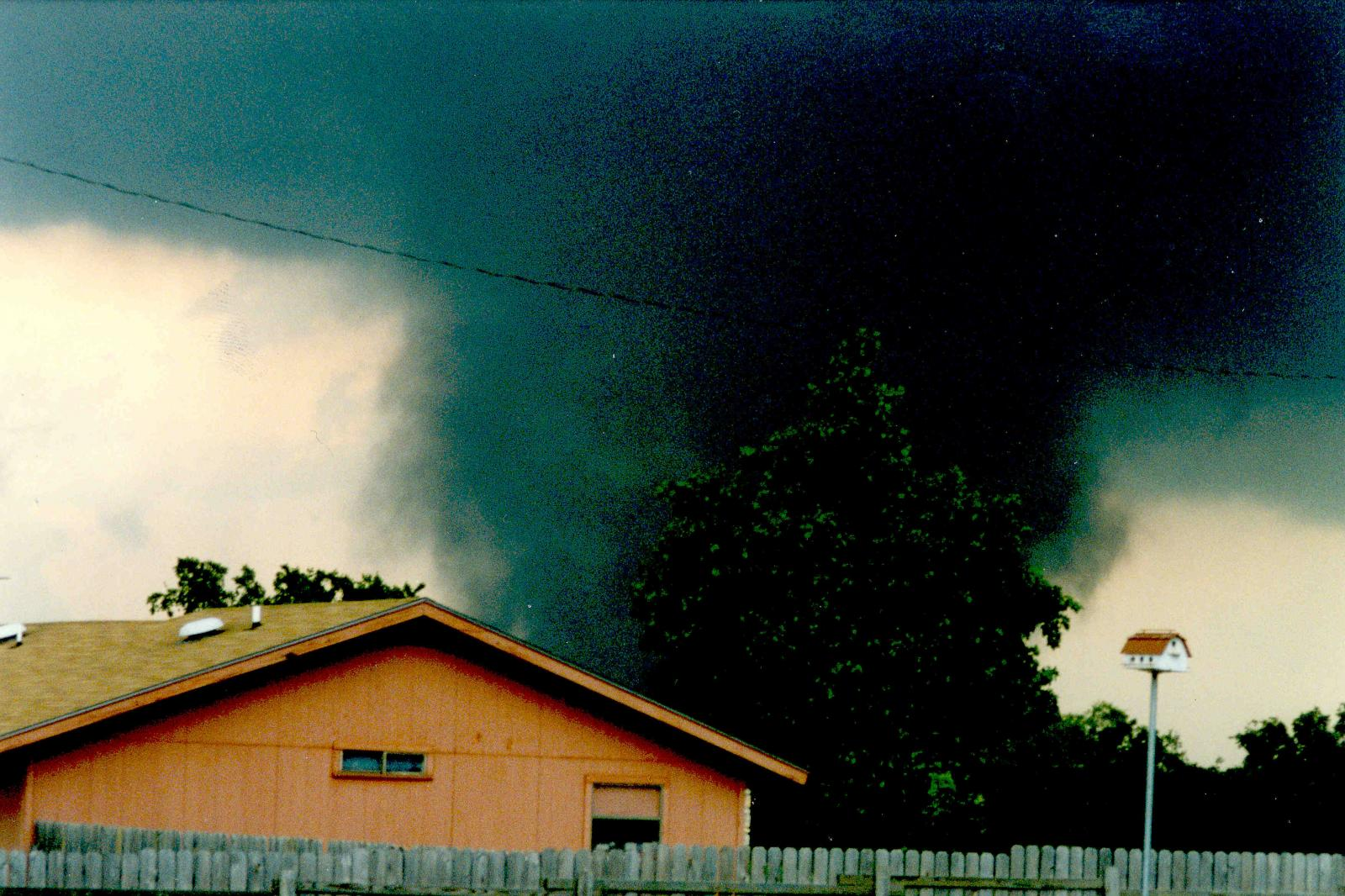
- A view of the tornado heading for the Double Creek Estates at F5 intensity.

Meteorological history
- Formed: May 27, 1997, 3:40 pm. CDT (UTC−05:00)
- Dissipated: May 27, 1997, 3:53 pm. CDT (UTC−05:00)
- Duration: 13 minutes

F5 tornado
- on the Fujita scale
- Highest winds: >261 mph (420 km/h)

Overall effects
- Fatalities: 27
- Injuries: 12
- Damage: $40.1 million (1997 USD)

This violent and slow moving tornado began within the Williamson County line 3 miles (4.8 km) north of Jarrell as a narrow and rope-shaped funnel swathed in large amounts of dust when it touched down at 3:40 p.m. Like the two F3 tornadoes earlier in the day, it developed along the gust front produced by its parent thunderstorm. This mechanism is typical of tornadogenesis not associated with supercell thunderstorms. Traffic along Interstate 35 came to a stop as the tornado descended nearby. The Texas Highway Patrol also stopped traffic on both sides of the interstate under the expectation that the tornado would cross the highway; it ultimately moved parallel to Interstate 35. Tracking south-southwest, the tornado quickly intensified and grew to a 1/2 mile (0.80 km) in width, changing from its initial thin and white appearance to a blue and black color. F5 tornado damage was identified early in the tornado's path. Its intense winds scoured the ground and stripped pavement from roads. The tornado tore 525 feet (160 m) of asphalt as it crossed County Roads 308, 305, and 307; the thickness of the asphalt pavement was roughly 0.8 inches (20 mm). A culvert plant at the corner of Country Roads 305 and 307 collapsed. Nearby, a similar plant and a mobile home sustained some damage, with the latter struck by a 2×4 piece of lumber. The occupants of a mobile home 500 feet (150 m) north-northwest of the culvert plant fled to a frame house that the tornado later struck; the evacuees were killed while the mobile home sustained only minor damage. Some of the most extreme damage at this location was inflicted to a small metal-framed recycling plant that was obliterated, with little left of the structure besides a few twisted structural beams.

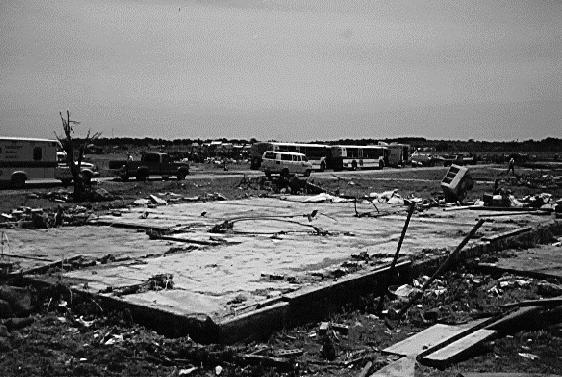
The Double Creek Estates subdivision was pulverized by the tornado, with many homes swept off their foundations and disintegrated. This photograph shows one remaining foundation with plumbing pulled out of the concrete.

The tornado then slowly entered the Double Creek Estates subdivision where it exacted its most catastrophic impacts. Concurrently, the tornado expanded further to its maximum width of 3/4 mile (1.2 km). Eyewitnesses indicated that the tornado's movement slowed to around 5–10 mph (8.0–16.1 km/h) as it entered the neighborhood; this may have contributed to the resulting extreme destruction. The tornado destroyed the first home it encountered at the northwestern corner of the subdivision; a clock recovered from the remaining debris was stopped at 3:48 p.m., presumably marking the time the tornado entered the community. Much of the neighborhood was completely swept away with little debris remaining, with what was left being reduced to small and unrecognizable fragments that were dispersed over a wide area. The lack of large items that were recovered, and the granularity of the debris was indicative of the sheer strength of the tornado. Due to the tornado's slow movement, homes near the center of its path experienced tornadic winds for approximately three minutes. The mostly wooden-framed residences, some well-built and anchored, were completely obliterated and swept away, leaving behind concrete slab foundations swept clean of all debris. All 27 fatalities associated with the Jarrell tornado occurred at Double Creek Estates, which at the time consisted of 131 residents living in 38 single-family homes and several mobile homes.

The tornado turned slightly towards the south-southwest after traversing Double Creek Estates. The damage in these outlying areas was somewhat scattershot; in one case, a mobile home suffered only minor damage while an adjacent house lost half of its roof. Metal buildings were unroofed along County Road 305 south of Jarrell. The road's guardrail was impaled by wooden planks thrown by the strong winds. The tornado then again crossed County Road 305 and entered a forest of cedar trees. Some of the damage to the trees suggested that the tornado may have been a multiple-vortex tornado, which was documented by Scott Beckwith, receiving a nickname as a “dead man walking”. Shortly after entering this forested area, the path of damage left behind by the tornado ended abruptly, with the National Centers for Environmental Information indicating that it lifted at 3:53 p.m. after remaining on the ground for 13 minutes and 5.1 miles (8.2 km).

=== Cedar Park, Texas ===
Cedar Park, Texas
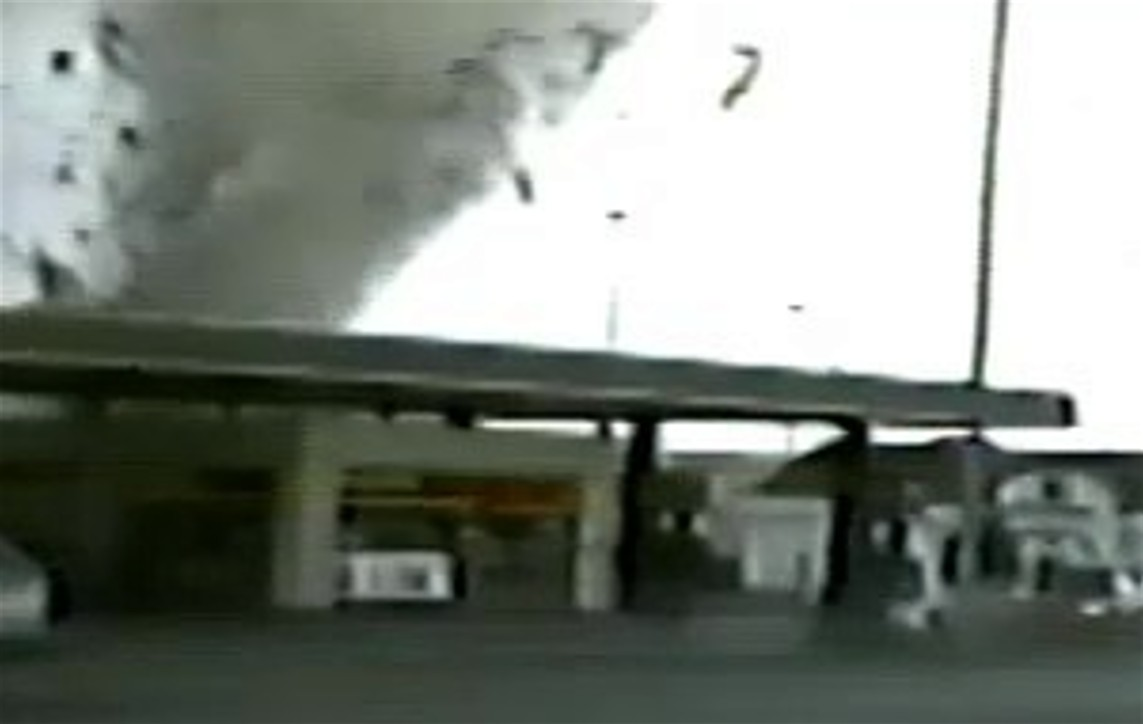
- A police dashboard camera still showing the tornado as it was destroying a grocery store.

Meteorological history
- Formed: May 27, 1997, 4:05 pm. CDT (UTC−05:00)
- Dissipated: May 27, 1997, 4:11 pm. CDT (UTC−05:00)
- Duration: 6 minutes

F3 tornado
- on the Fujita scale
- Highest winds: >158 mph (254 km/h)

Overall effects
- Fatalities: 0
- Injuries: 15
- Damage: $70 million (1997 USD)

This short lived tornado began 3.5 miles (5.6 km) north of Cedar Park just south of CR 178, 1 mile (1.6 km) east of an intersection on US 183 at 4:05 pm. The tornado mainly inflicted damage to trees as it tracked southwestward, going over a residential area and inflicting minor roof damage to a single home, stripping shingles away. The tornado then crossed CR 180 just east of US 183 at F2-F3 intensity, where it passed a railway track and struck a train's coal tender that weighed 65,000 pounds (29,000 kg), overturning and tossing it a short distance. As it continued across CR 180, it then struck an Albertsons store at peak F3 intensity, uplifting the weakly supported roof, violently forcing outward doors to push inward. The store's manager sheltered the residents that were shopping, via hiding in a large meat locker. The tornado began to weaken as damage to other businesses in the area was minor.

The tornado then crossed US 183 before continuing through Marquis Lane and North Park Circle, inflicting insignificant damage to homes near. Passing North Park Circle, the tornado entered the northeastern part of the subdivision Buttercup Creek at F0-F2 intensity, which had well-built homes. Damage in Buttercup Creek was reportedly inconsistent, with one home having a completely uplifted roof, while the one near only suffered minor shingle damage. Two homes were notably near total destruction, as a pickup truck was tossed by the tornado, crashing into the homes. In Buttercup Creek, 11 homes were destroyed, and over 100 were damaged in some way.

The tornado then began shifting southwesternward, tracking into a heavily forested area, where it eventually crossed the Travis County border, nearing Lake Travis. In the wooded areas, more inconsistent damage occurred, as a portion of trees was near total destruction, while other portions had only 10% of trees destroyed. After entering Lake Travis, the tornado began to weaken significantly, with it roping out and dissipating just 1.1 miles (1.8 km) from the reservoir.

In total, the tornado destroyed 11 permanent homes, caused $70M (1997 USD) in damages, injured 15, was tracked for 9.2 miles (14.8 km), and had a peak width 250 yards (230 m).

=== Pedernales Valley, Texas ===
Pedernales Valley, Texas
- View of the tornado over Lake Travis

Meteorological history
- Formed: May 27, 1997, 2:50 pm. CDT (UTC−05:00)
- Dissipated: May 27, 1997, 3:15 pm. CDT (UTC−05:00)
- Duration: 25 minutes

F4 tornado
- on the Fujita scale
- Highest winds: >207 mph (333 km/h)

Overall effects
- Fatalities: 1
- Injuries: 5
- Damage: $15 million (1997 USD)

This violent F4 tornado began just west on the shore of Lake Travis, tracking westward as it moved through the Pedernales Valley towards the lake, touching down at around 2:50 pm at F0 intensity. As the tornado continued through the rough terrain of Hill Country near the shore of Lake Travis, the tornado intensified to F3 intensity and began uprooting trees before striking a marina, where the boats were heavily damaged if not destroyed. The tornado maintained an F2-F3 intensity until it crossed Bee Creek Road, where it rapidly intensified and reached peak intensity as it struck a well-built Southern Bell telecommunications building, inflicting F4 damage to the structure and destroying equipment, and on the same road, a home, collapsing its walls at F3 intensity.

Shortly afterwards, the tornado, around 2.2 miles (3.5 km) away from the shores of Lake Travis, majorly shifted west-southwestward towards transmission towers, collapsing them as the tornado crossed into the Hazy Hills subdivision. As the tornado entered Hazy Hills, the tornado seriously damaged multiple mobile homes and well-built houses at F4 intensity, with some severely damaged and uninhabitable or completely swept away. A man was killed as the tornado struck his mobile home, completely demolishing it. His truck was also found in severe condition hundreds of feet away. It is unknown if he attempted to flee the storm via car or was struck by the storm within the mobile home.

The tornado continued west-southwest where it neared State Highway 71, beginning to deteriorate in strength. The tornado then entered the Lick Creek Valley subdivision, where it uplifted the roof of a stone-wall home along Pedernales Drive at F2 intensity. Various other homes sustained similar damage on their roofs. After exiting Lick Creek Valley and crossing SR 71, the tornado began to rope out and eventually dissipated 1 mile (1.6 km) northwest of Bee Cave, Texas.

In total, the tornado tracked 5.8 miles (9.3 km), had a peak width of 440 yards (0.25 mi; 0.40 km), killed 1, injured 5, and caused $15M (1997 USD) in damages.

== Non-tornadic effects ==
In addition to the tornadoes, there were 12 reports of large hail in Central Texas received by the National Weather Service during the late afternoon and evening. The largest hail—measuring nearly 4 in (100 mm) in diameter—was recorded in Cedar Park in conjunction with the F3 tornado that hit the city. Damaging hail was also reported in Georgetown beginning at 3:55 p.m. Severe thunderstorms also generated damaging straight-line winds across the Hill Country and South-Central Texas. Much of these winds were associated with the eventual, non-tornadic line of storms that resulted from the coalescence of the day's earlier storms. Wind gusts ranging between 58–71 mph (93–114 km/h) were recorded in Austin, with the peak 71 mph (114 km/h) wind gust occurring at Robert Mueller Municipal Airport at 4:20 p.m. There were also unofficial reports of winds reaching as high as 90 mph (140 km/h) to the west of Austin near Lake Travis. Kelly Air Force Base in San Antonio registered a gust of 122 mph (196 km/h) at 8:03 p.m. Gusts reached 61 mph (98 km/h) in Del Rio and overturned a plane at an airport near Seguin. The storms knocked out power to 60,000 electricity customers in Austin and as many as 21,000 electricity customers serviced by Texas Utilities. Telephone service for more than 3,000 residents in the Pedernales Valley was disrupted. The thunderstorms also produced heavy rain that triggered floods in Blanco, Gonzales, Karnes, and Travis counties. An official rainfall total of 1.44 in (37 mm) was documented in Austin, though 2.5 in (64 mm) of rain fell in nearby Round Rock. The rains caused Brushy Creek to flood beyond its banks as far east as Thorndale. One person drowned in floodwaters along Shoal Creek in Austin. Another person died in Cedar Park of cardiac arrest likely induced by storm-related stress. The Southwestern Insurance Information Service estimated that the totality of the storms' effects inflicted $25–40 million in insured losses; most insured claims originated from Cedar Park.

== Aftermath ==
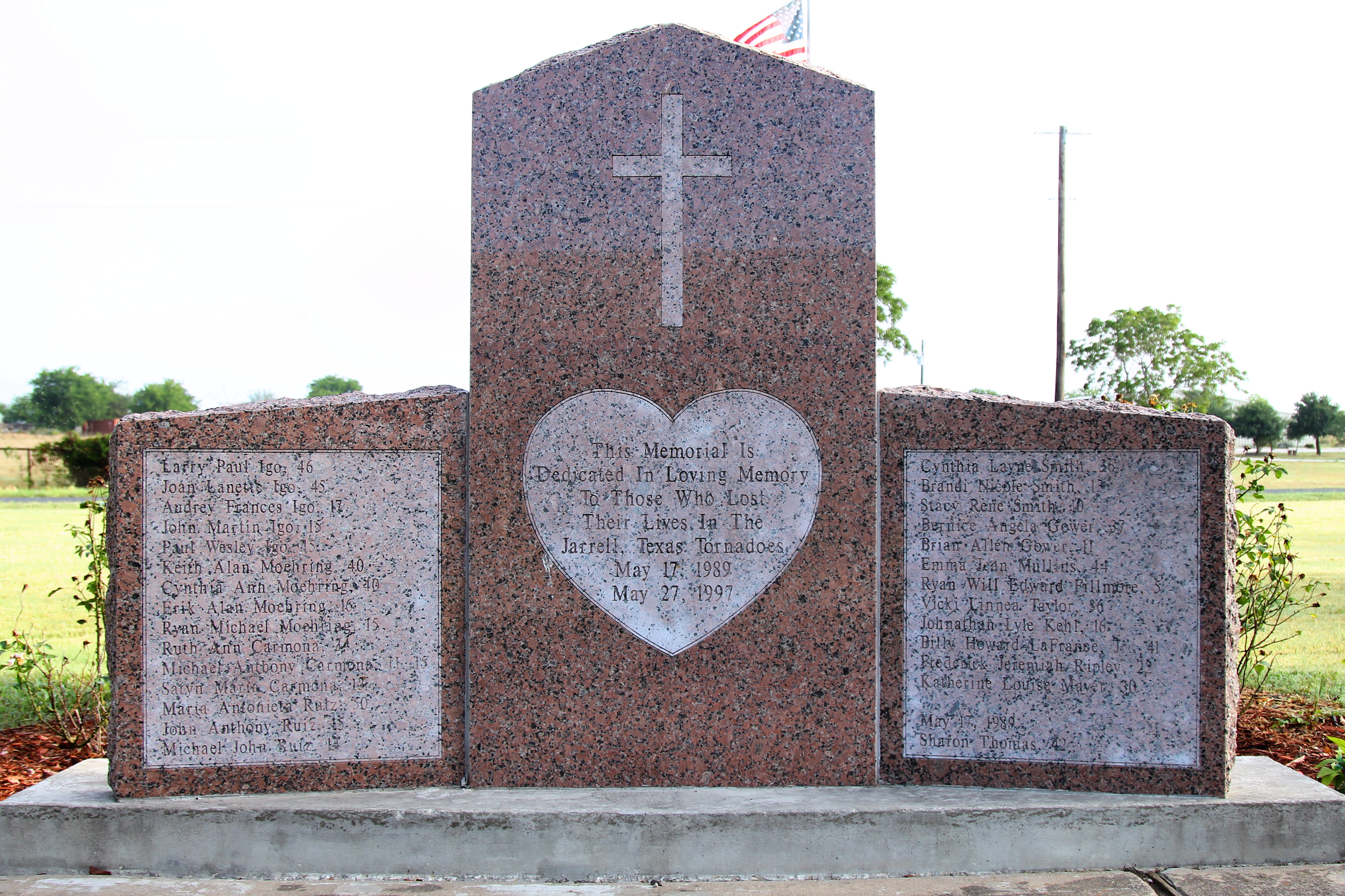
The memorial at Jarrell Memorial Park naming the victims of the 1989 and 1997 Jarrell tornadoes

Law enforcement officers from the Texas Department of Public Safety, four municipal police departments, and two county sheriff's offices aided search-and-rescue efforts in the aftermath of the Jarrell tornado. The Texas National Guard and other volunteers from around Central Texas joined in the search. The Scott & White Blood Center facilitated blood donations. A temporary shelter was established by the American Red Cross at Jarrell High School for those displaced by the tornado, providing food and accepting clothes donations. The agency's relief operations, covering residents of 211 homes, cost an estimated $250,000; community donations covered at least $200,000 of the expenses. The Jarrell Volunteer Fire Department organized a temporary morgue; the deceased were later brought to the Travis County Forensic Center for identification. Although a death toll of 30 people was initially reported, that figure was later revised to 27; the inflated count was attributed to the dispersion of remains that led some fatalities to be tallied twice. Carcasses of livestock were buried at Double Creek Estates.

Then-Texas Governor George W. Bush declared Williamson County a disaster area; Bush visited Jarrell on May 28 and described the tornadic damage as the worst he had ever witnessed. U.S. Senator Kay Bailey Hutchison also visited Jarrell and Cedar Park. Bush later requested federal aid for Williamson and Bell counties with support from Hutchinson. The Federal Emergency Management Agency elected not to provide federal aid, citing the contributions from private and state sources. Instead, the Small Business Administration and U.S. Department of Agriculture made available loans for the rebuilding of homes, farms, and ranches. The U.S. Congress approved a relief bill allocating $5.4 billion for 35 states affected by natural disasters, including Texas. However, the bill also included other provisions that led President Bill Clinton to veto the bill. A drive-through donation line was established at Auditorium Shores in Austin. Local musicians organized and performed at a benefit concert at Austin Music Hall, attracting an audience of 2,800 and raising about $94,000. Businesses also donated to the relief efforts.

First responders representing Cedar Park, Austin, Leander, Round Rock, and Williamson and Travis counties arrived in Cedar Park shortly after the city was hit by a tornado. Texas A&M University supplied equipment for search-and-rescue operations in the aftermath of the Cedar Park tornado. These operations were the first test of the 186-member Texas Urban Search and Rescue Team, which was created following the 1995 Oklahoma City bombing. Vouchers were distributed by the American Red Cross to storm victims in the Buttercup Creek subdivision for clothing, food, and other supplies. Texas State Troopers blocked areas of Buttercup Creek to prevent looting.

A memorial was erected in downtown Jarrell bearing the names of the 27 people killed by the Jarrell tornado. The Jarrell Memorial Park was established near Double Creek Estates on the land of the former Igo family, who perished in the tornado. The park contains 27 trees planted in honor of the victims. In 2019, the memorial was relocated to the park along with the city's historical marker. The events and survivor accounts of the tornado were profiled in television documentaries such as the 1999 episode of HBO's America Undercover series titled "Fatal Twisters: A Season of Fury", the 1999 BBC television series titled Twister Week (also known as Tornado Diary in the United States) in an episode titled "Tornado Alley", the seventh episode of the Discovery Channel program Storm Warning, produced by GRB Entertainment, and the 2006 documentary Ultimate Disaster (also known as Mega Disaster) on National Geographic Channel.

== See also ==
- List of North American tornadoes and tornado outbreaks
- 1922 Austin twin tornadoes – also featured southwestward-tracking tornadoes that struck the Austin, Texas, area
- Tornado outbreak of April 6–9, 1998 – produced the official first F5 tornado after the Jarrell tornado
- 1953 Waco tornado – the deadliest tornado in Texas history

== Bibliography ==
- Henderson, James H.; Hakkarinen, Ida M.; Lerner, William H.; McLaughlin, Melvin R.; Looney, James M.; McIntyre, E. L.; Peters, Brian E.; Trainor, Marilu; Paz, Enrique; Kolavic, Shellie Ann; Zane, David; Phan, Long T. (April 1998). The Central Texas Tornadoes of May 27, 1997 (PDF) (Service Assessment). Silver Spring, Maryland: National Oceanic and Atmospheric Administration.
- Houston, Adam L.; Wilhelmson, Robert B. (March 1, 2007). "Observational Analysis of the 27 May 1997 Central Texas Tornadic Event. Part I: Prestorm Environment and Storm Maintenance/Propagation". Monthly Weather Review. 135 (3). American Meteorological Society: 701–726. Bibcode:2007MWRv..135..701H. doi:10.1175/MWR3300.1.
- Houston, Adam L.; Wilhelmson, Robert B. (March 1, 2007). "Observational Analysis of the 27 May 1997 Central Texas Tornadic Event. Part II: Tornadoes". Monthly Weather Review. 135 (3). American Meteorological Society: 727–735. Bibcode:2007MWRv..135..727H. doi:10.1175/MWR3301.1.
- Morgan, Carl; Orrock, Jeff; Rydell, Nezette; Ward, Jimmy (July 1998). "A Meteorological and Radar Analysis of the Central Texas Tornado Outbreak on May 27, 1997" (PDF). New Braunfels, Texas: National Weather Service – via NOAA Institutional Repository.
- Phan, Long T.; Simiu, Emil (July 1998). The Fujita Tornado Intensity Scale: A Critique Based on Observations of the Jarrell Tornado of May 27, 1997 (PDF). Gaithersburg, Maryland: National Institute of Standards and Technology.
