= Tornadoes of 1997 =

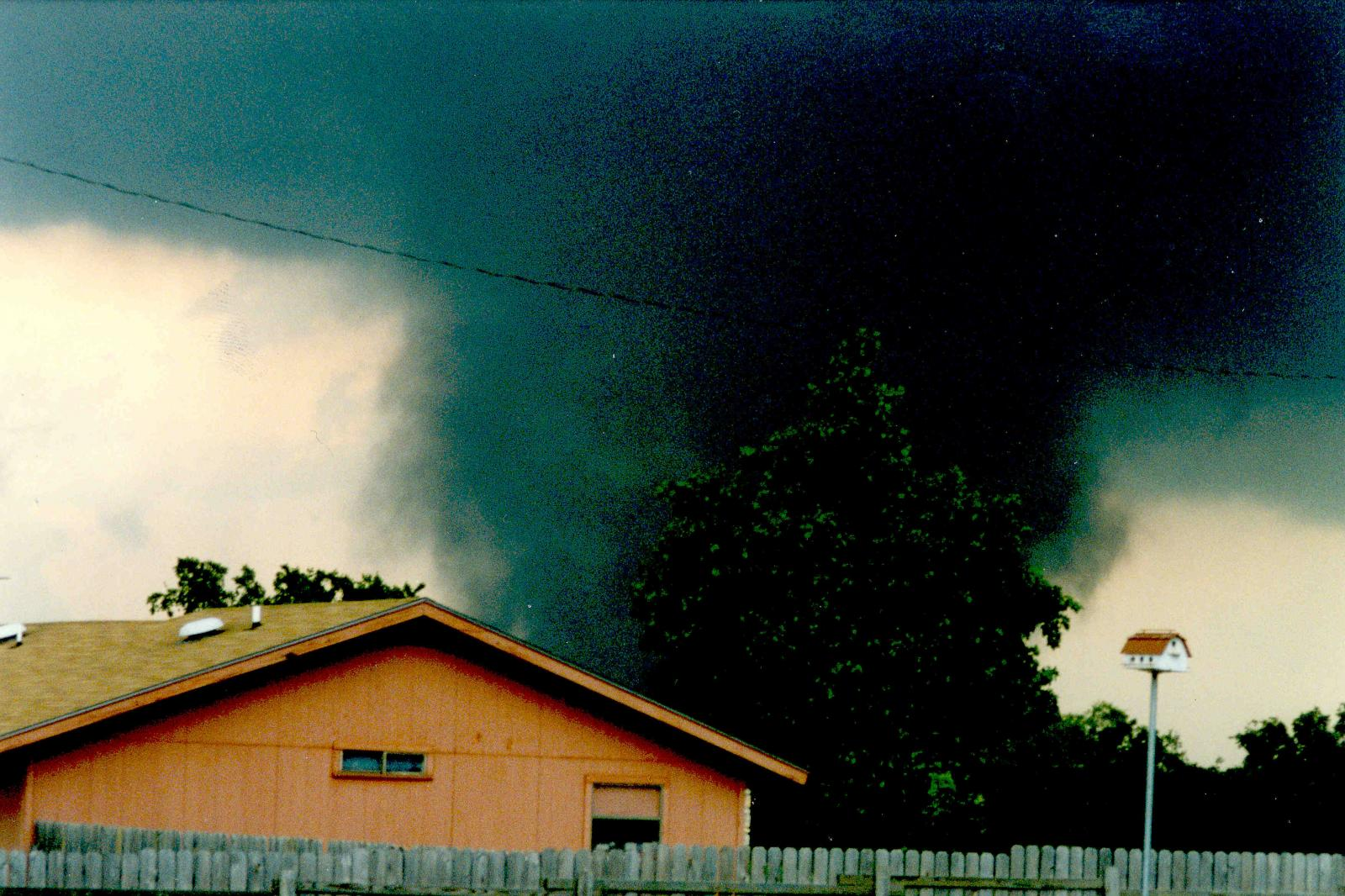
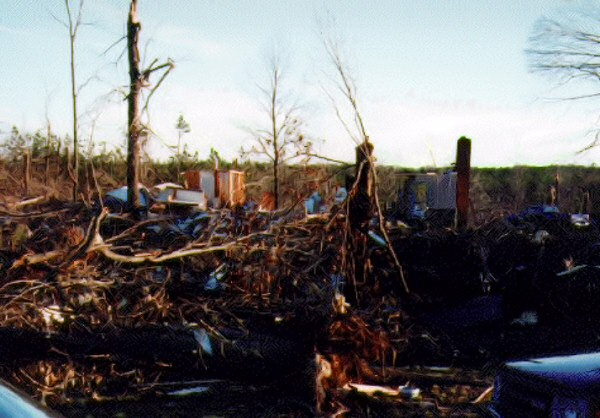
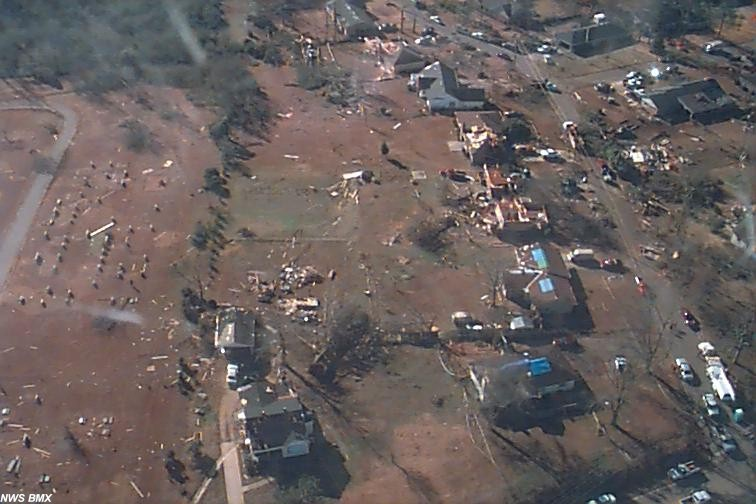
- Clockwise from top: An F5 tornado approaching a subdivision in Jarrell, Texas on May 27; F4 damage to a home in Vimy Ridge, Arkansas after a tornado on March 1; A wood plank lodged in a tree by a tornado on June 13; A traffic camera still of an F3 tornado near Moody, Texas on May 27; the aftermath of F2 damage in Tuscaloosa, Alabama on January 24, and radar reflectivity of the supercell that produced the F1 tornado that impacted Miami on May 12.
- Timespan: January - December 1997
- Maximum rated tornado: F5 tornado: Jarrell, Texas on May 27
- Tornadoes in U.S.: 1,148
- Damage (U.S.): $731 million
- Fatalities (U.S.): 68
- Fatalities (worldwide): >71

This page documents the tornadoes and tornado outbreaks of 1997, primarily in the United States. Most tornadoes form in the U.S., although some events may take place internationally. Tornado statistics for older years like this often appear significantly lower than modern years due to fewer reports or confirmed tornadoes, however by the 1990s tornado statistics were coming closer to the numbers we see today.

== Synopsis ==
Fatal United States tornadoes in 1997
- Approximate touchdown location of killer tornadoes in 1997
Summary of tornadoes
- January 4 – Kentucky (1 death)
- January 24 – Alabama (1 death)
- February 20 – Arkansas (1 death)
- March 1 – Mississippi (1 death)
- March 1 – Arkansas (6 deaths)
- March 1 – Arkansas (4 deaths)
- March 1 – Arkansas (15 deaths)
- March 1 – Tennessee (1 death)
- March 28 – Kentucky (1 death)
- March 28 – Kentucky (1 death)
- April 10 – Texas (1 death)
- May 2 – Georgia (1 death)
- May 27 – Texas (27 deaths)
- May 27 – Texas (1 death)
- July 2 – Michigan (1 death)
- July 2 – Michigan (1 death)
- July 23 – North Dakota (1 death)
- July 23 – South Carolina (1 death)
- August 16 – Pennsylvania (1 death)
- September 18 – Minnesota (1 death)
Total fatalities: 68

The 1997 tornado season was largely defined by two tornado events. The first was a major outbreak on March 1 that resulted in 27 fatalities, 25 of which were in Arkansas. The second was a brutal, slow-moving F5 tornado that struck the small town of Jarrell, Texas on May 27 killing 27 people and leaving behind some of the most extreme damage already caused by tornadoes.

== Events ==
Confirmed tornado total for the entire year 1997 in the United States.

Confirmed tornadoes by Fujita rating
FU	F0	F1	F2	F3	F4	F5	Total
0	743	281	85	29	9	1	1,148

== January ==
There were 70 tornadoes confirmed in the US in January.

=== January 23–24 ===
FU	F0	F1	F2	F3	F4	F5
0	2	4	9	0	1	0

A tornado outbreak in January produced 16 tornadoes in the Deep South. Damage from the tornadoes totaled around $16.771 million and 43 people were injured. An F2 tornado struck Tuscaloosa, Alabama on January 24, resulting in the second tornado fatality of the year. The tornado also injured 10 others and damaged up to 100 structures.

== February ==
There were 23 tornadoes confirmed in the US in February.

=== February 28 – March 1 ===
FU	F0	F1	F2	F3	F4	F5
0	12	11	8	5	3	0

A major tornado outbreak struck portions of the central and southern United States on March 1, with the initial activity beginning on February 28. Affecting areas mostly from Arkansas to Kentucky, the two-day outbreak produced 39 tornadoes and killed at least 27 people including 25 in Arkansas alone with one death in each Mississippi and Tennessee. This was Arkansas' deadliest tornado outbreak since May 15, 1968, where 34 were killed in Jonesboro. Over 400 others were injured during this event, which was about 45% of the yearly average of tornado-related injuries in the United States.

== March ==
There were 102 tornadoes confirmed in the US in March.

== April ==
There were 114 tornadoes confirmed in the US in April.

== May ==
There were 225 tornadoes confirmed in the US in May.

=== May 12 ===
FU	F0	F1	F2	F3	F4	F5
0	0	1	0	0	0	0

A highly visible F1 tornado moved directly through Downtown Miami, Florida. The tornado is remembered not so much for its minor damage, but for its haunting pictures, which made headlines around the world.

=== May 25–26 ===
A two-day tornado outbreak struck Oklahoma, Texas, and Kansas. F2 tornadoes struck Perth, Kansas, and Duncan, Oklahoma. A stovepipe tornado touched down near the Red River. On May 26, several intense tornadoes struck Oklahoma including a wedge tornado near Preston and another near Beggs.

=== May 27 ===
FU	F0	F1	F2	F3	F4	F5
0	6	6	3	3	1	1

An unusual and extremely violent tornado outbreak occurred in Central Texas. The F5 tornado that struck the town of Jarrell, Texas killed 27 of the 1,319 residents. The tornado was 3/4 of a mile (1.2 of a km) wide and tracked 7.6 miles (12.2 km). Double Creek Estates, a subdivision of Jarrell, was wiped off the map with all 38 homes and several mobile homes destroyed.

== June ==
There were 193 tornadoes confirmed in the US in June.

=== June 11 ===
FU	F0	F1	F2	F3	F4	F5
0	12	6	0	1	0	0

A tornado outbreak struck the Texas Panhandle. While most of the tornadoes were weak, rated F0 and F1, a large F3 tornado injured 13 people as it passed between McLean and Shamrock. Several other weak tornadoes touched down across parts of Kansas, Colorado, Nebraska, and South Dakota.

=== June 13 (Brazil) ===
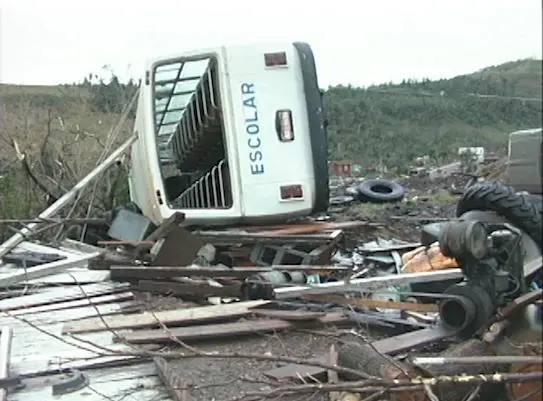
A bus toppled by the tornado near a pile of scattered debris.

An F4 tornado destroyed 80% of all structures within Nova Laranjeiras, Paraná, even ripping homes from their foundations, vehicles were thrown hundreds of metres away and a bus was toppled. Trees were debarked and debris were found lodged in trees. As a result of this tornado, 4 fatalities were confirmed and 79 were seriously injured.

=== June 24 (Canada) ===
FU	F0	F1	F2	F3	F4	F5
0	1	0	0	0	0	0

An extremely weak F0 tornado touched down in Lantz, Nova Scotia, Canada. This tornado was the fifth confirmed tornado in Nova Scotia, causing no damage.

== July ==
There were 188 tornadoes confirmed in the US in July.

=== July 1-3 ===
FU	F0	F1	F2	F3	F4	F5
0	13	26	9	4	0	0

A localized, but destructive tornado outbreak occurred in the built-up area of Detroit, Michigan. There were 13 tornadoes in total, three of which hit neighborhoods and downtown, striking Detroit’s West Side between I-96 and Eight Mile Road, Hamtramck and Highland Park. The storms killed seven, caused local flooding, and destroyed houses. Five of the fatalities were recorded in Groose Pointe Farms due to straight-line winds of up to 100 mph that blew a gazebo full of people into Lake St. Clair. One tornado formed east of the Detroit River, causing damage in Essex County, Ontario near Windsor. Four tornadoes were rated F3.

== August ==
There were 84 tornadoes confirmed in the US in August.

=== August 12 (Country of Georgia) ===
A tornado tracked north of Garga, Georgia during the early hours of August 12. Heavy rain and hail accompanied the storm. Three people were killed and serious damage was reported. It was rated F2 by the European Severe Storms Laboratory.

== September ==
There were 32 tornadoes confirmed in the US in September.

== October ==
There were 100 tornadoes confirmed in the US in October.

== November ==
There were 25 tornadoes confirmed in the US in November.

== December ==
There were 12 tornadoes confirmed in the US in December.

== See also ==
- Tornado
  - Tornadoes by year
  - Tornado records
  - Tornado climatology
  - Tornado myths
- List of tornado outbreaks
  - List of F5 and EF5 tornadoes
  - List of North American tornadoes and tornado outbreaks
  - List of 21st-century Canadian tornadoes and tornado outbreaks
  - List of European tornadoes and tornado outbreaks
  - List of tornadoes and tornado outbreaks in Asia
  - List of Southern Hemisphere tornadoes and tornado outbreaks
  - List of tornadoes striking downtown areas
- Tornado intensity
  - Fujita scale
  - Enhanced Fujita scale
