= 1997 Miami tornado =

F1 tornado which touched down in Miami, Florida

- Radar imagery of the storm that spawned the tornado

Meteorological history
- Formed: 1:53 p.m. EDT (UTC−04:00); May 12, 1997
- Dissipated: 2:08 p.m. EDT (UTC−04:00); May 12, 1997
- Duration: 15 minutes

F1 tornado
- on the Fujita scale
- Max width: 150 yd (140 m)
- Path length: 8 mi (13 km)
- Highest winds: 110 mph (175 km/h)

Overall effects
- Fatalities: 0
- Injuries: 12
- Damage: $525,000 (1997 USD)
- Areas affected: Miami, Florida, U.S.
- Power outages: 21,000 people
- Part of the tornadoes of 1997

On May 12, 1997, a rare and weak F1 tornado touched down in Miami, Florida. The tornado, also known as the 1997 Miami tornado, or the Great Miami tornado, was on the ground for 8 miles, causing $525,000 (1997 USD) in 15 minutes. It is remembered for media coverage of it pictured near the city's downtown skyline.

== Meteorological Synopsis ==
=== Synoptics ===
An upper air observation at 12:00 UTC highlighted CAPE values at up to 1418 J/kg, and PWAT at 1.75 inches (44.45 mm). A Weather front was forecast to move into central Florida, and a low pressure system was forecast to go northeast into Florida’s Big Bend region. A 90 knot jet stream went across southern Florida. At the 250 mb level, winds were found to be 81 knots. By 12:00 UTC, winds had shifted south. Wind shear had weakened to a 20 - 15 knot breeze between 2,000 and 10,000 feet above the surface. As the day moved on, speed shear increased. Helicity values were found to be 131 m2/s2.

=== Tornado watch and warning ===
A tornado watch was issued by the Storm Prediction Center at 11:29 A.M. EDT, it was effective until 5:00 P.M. EDT. “Storms will continue to increase across South Florida in a very moist and unstable atmosphere. The potential for supercell tornadoes will increase during the early afternoon as the shear profile strengthens.”At 1:55 P.M. EDT, a tornado warning was issued by NWS Miami. A funnel cloud was reported, and WSR-88D indicated rotation made the NWS issue the warning.

== Tornado summary ==
The tornado formed at 1:53 p.m. EDT, initially touching down in the Silver Bluff Estates area. The tornado crossed Interstate 95, then swept through Downtown Miami bypassing the city's skyscrapers. It crossed the MacArthur Causeway and the Venetian Causeway towards Miami Beach, sideswiping the cruise ship MS Sovereign of the Seas. The tornado lifted from the water halfway through Biscayne Bay and touched down briefly again in Collins Road, Miami Beach. It then flipped over a car and dissipated soon after.

== Aftermath ==
The tornado ultimately caused 12 injuries and $525,000 in damage, though no injuries were serious. The tornado's passage also cut power to 21,000 people. The tornado also uprooted trees, scattered debris, and shattered the glass facades of buildings.

== See also ==
- List of North American tornadoes and tornado outbreaks
- Tornadoes of 1997
