= March 1997 tornado outbreak =

Weather event in the United States

Meteorological history
- Duration: March 1–2, 1997

Tornado outbreak
- Tornadoes: 39 confirmed
- Max. rating: F4 tornado
- Duration: 32 hours

Overall effects
- Casualties: 27 deaths, 464 injuries
- Damage: $115 million-$120 million (1997 USD)
- Areas affected: Arkansas, Mississippi, Kentucky, and Tennessee
- Part of the tornadoes of 1997

The March 1997 tornado outbreak was a major tornado outbreak that struck portions of the central and southern United States on March 1–2, 1997. Affecting areas mostly from Arkansas to Kentucky, the outbreak produced 58 tornadoes, including three violent (F4) tornadoes, and killed at least 27 people, including 25 in Arkansas alone and one death each in Mississippi and Tennessee. This was Arkansas' deadliest tornado outbreak since May 15, 1968, when 34 were killed in Jonesboro. Severe flooding also occurred across the Ohio and Tennessee Valleys, resulting in 16 Ohio counties and 44 Kentucky counties being declared disaster areas. The flash floods and damaging wind elsewhere caused 34 deaths across six states including 19 in Kentucky, five in Ohio, five in Tennessee, two in Texas and three in West Virginia. Damage estimates were about $1 billion (1997 USD) while 75,000 homes were damaged.

== Meteorological synopsis ==
On March 1, 1997, very unstable air invaded much of the affected area while much warmer temperatures were recorded. Temperatures across most of Arkansas which normally at that time are below 60 °F (16 °C) reached the mid to upper 70s °F (24 °C). A cold front was approaching from the Midwestern Plains and was associated with a strong low further north. Strong temperature contrasts were observed on either side of the front. In addition, winds near the ground and aloft were very strong and significant shear was noted before given additional ingredients for extreme severe weather across the Mississippi and Tennessee Valleys on March 1, 1997. On February 28, 1997, the Storm Prediction Center (SPC) had issued a Day 2 moderate risk of severe weather for much of Arkansas and a tornado watch was issued for the western and central part of the state during the morning hours of March 1. Early on March 1, the SPC issued a tornado watch for portions of the Mississippi and Tennessee Valleys. Throughout the day, the National Weather Service office in Little Rock, Arkansas, issued 57 weather warnings, including 34 tornado warnings. Areas affected by the deadly tornadoes had tornado warnings with lead time estimated at between nine and 28 minutes.

Outbreak death toll
State	Total	County	County total
Arkansas	25	Clark	6
Arkansas	25	Greene	1
Arkansas	25	Jackson	3
Arkansas	25	Pulaski	5
Arkansas	25	Saline	10
Mississippi	1	Pontotoc	1
Tennessee	1	Dyer	1
Totals	27		
All deaths were tornado-related

== Confirmed tornadoes ==
Confirmed tornadoes by Fujita rating
FU	F0	F1	F2	F3	F4	F5	Total
0	12	11	8	5	3	0	39

=== February 28 event ===
F#	Location	County	Time (UTC)	Path length	Damage
Mississippi
F0	NE of Brownsville	Hinds	2230	1 miles (1.6 km)	Damage was limited to trees.
F0	SW of Flora	Madison	2240	2 miles (3.2 km)	Damage was limited to trees.
F0	N of Kearney Park	Madison	2255	1 miles (1.6 km)	One tree was blown down.
F0	NE of Myrleville	Yazoo	2315	2 miles (3.2 km)	Damage was limited to trees.
Source: Tornado History Project - February 28, 1997 Storm Data

=== March 1 event ===
F#	Location	County	Time (UTC)	Path length	Damage
Mississippi
F1	Shepard to NW of Sherman	Calhoun, Pontotoc	0647	25 miles (40 km)	1 death – One mobile home was destroyed, killing its 50-year-old occupant, who was thrown 75 yards (69 m). Pieces of the mobile home, including its metal frame, were scattered for some distance. 25 barns, two mobile homes, and two homes were destroyed. Nine homes were damaged. Two horses were killed as well.
F3	N of Banner to NW of Graham	Calhoun, Lafayette, Pontotoc, Union	0835	50 miles (80 km)	Long-track tornado. 91 homes were damaged along the path, 49 of them heavily. The worst damage occurred near Martintown.
Kentucky
F0	N of Bowling Green	Warren	1026	0.5 miles (0.8 km)	Damage was limited to trees.
F2	S of Gamaliel	Monroe	1036	4 miles (6.4 km)	Two homes and several barns were destroyed.
F0	S of Valley Hill	Washington	1759	5 miles (8 km)	Damage was limited to trees and a car.
F1	N of Stanton	Powell	1950	6 miles (9.6 km)	A hangar, a prop plane, and two other aircraft were destroyed. Some homes and barns were damaged as well.
F0	SW of Pomeroyton	Menifee	2015	0.1 miles (0.16 km)	Brief tornado with no damage.
F0	NW of Nuckols	McLean	0001	0.3 miles (0.5 km)	Brief tornado with no damage.
F1	W of Hardyville	Warren	0400	0.5 miles (0.8 km)	Two barns and a silo were destroyed while one home, one mobile home, and one barn were damaged.
F0	SW of Crailhope	Metcalfe	0525	0.1 miles (0.16 km)	Damage to trees and power lines.
F0	Stanton area	Powell	0620	1 miles (1.6 km)	Damage to two greenhouses, a barn, several houses, and several businesses.
F0	SW of Scranton	Menifee	0630	0.1 miles (0.16 km)	Damage was limited to trees.
Tennessee
F2	N of Napier	Lewis	0725	3.9 miles (6.2 km)	Five homes were damaged and one barn was destroyed.
F2	SE of Ashland	Wayne, Lawrence, Lewis	0732	7.8 miles (12.5 km)	Four homes were damaged and three trailers were destroyed.
F2	Selmer area	McNairy	1145	5 miles (8 km)	48 homes and two businesses were damaged or destroyed.
F2	SW of Alamo to McKenzie	Crockett, Gibson, Carroll	2202	30 miles (48 km)	Several businesses and 67 homes were damaged, and a storage shed was destroyed as well.
Arkansas
F3	Hope to NE of Prescott	Heampstead, Nevada	1955	18 miles (28.8 km)	Numerous homes, buildings, mobile homes, and vehicles were heavily damaged or destroyed.
F1	NW of Salesville to N of Jordan	Baxter	2010	5 miles (8.0 km)	This tornado struck south of Briarcliff. A storage building was destroyed and a mobile was overturned.
F4	W of Beirne to Arkadelphia to W of Fenter	Clark, Hot Spring	2020	51 miles (81.6 km)	6 deaths – Much of downtown Arkadelphia was completely destroyed, with 60 blocks severely damaged. 56 out of 57 mobile homes were destroyed in one trailer park. About 250 homes, 90 mobile homes, and 45 businesses were damaged or destroyed. More than 100 homes and businesses were destroyed in Clark County, including many in Arkadelphia, where 60 blocks were severely damaged. The Clark County courthouse lost its capstone and clockwork. Five of the fatalities were in Arkadelphia and the sixth on Interstate 30 southwest of the city. Homes and buildings were destroyed in Donaldson, which received F4 damage, and damage was also noted at the Malvern Airport.
F1	NW of Cabot	Lonoke	2037	3 miles (4.8 km)	Roofs of several buildings were damaged.
F3	NW of Ward to W of Searcy	White	2039	13 miles (21 km)	This tornado passed near Antioch. Utility towers, a frame home, and trailers were destroyed.
F1	NW of Belleville	Yell	2055	1 miles (1.6 km)	Damage was limited to trees.
F1	N of Chickalah	Yell	2105	1 miles (1.6 km)	Several chicken houses were destroyed.
F3	W of Velvet Ridge to E of Marmaduke	White, Jackson, Independence, Craighead, Lawrence, Greene	2123	68 miles (108.8 km)	4 deaths – This long-tracked tornado began in White County, where a mobile home was destroyed, injuring three people. In Jackson County, the worst damage occurred in Jacksonport; two people were killed by a falling tree, and a third death was in a destroyed mobile home. Several mobile and frame homes had their roofs partly torn off, and numerous trees were downed or sheared off along the path. In Independence County, the tornado also damaged many homes and downed trees. In Craighead County, one home was damaged, injuring two people inside. In Lawrence County, 13 homes and other structures, including a grain bin storing rice, were damaged. Two people were injured as their mobile home rolled over. In Greene County, one person was killed as the tornado damaged or destroyed 20 homes and other buildings. The worst damage in Greene County was in Marmaduke, which was later hit by an F3 tornado in 2006.
F4	S of Bauxite to SE of Mabelvale (SW Little Rock) to North Little Rock	Saline, Pulaski	2125	25 miles (40 km)	15 deaths – Developing near Benton, this tornado passed south of Bauxite and Bryant before striking Vimy Ridge, killing 10 people in Saline County. The Shannon Hills area was devastated, reporting F4 damage; 90 homes were destroyed and 175 homes were damaged. Nearby, a home improvement center was completely destroyed south of Little Rock. It then entered Pulaski County and struck the southern and eastern portions of the Little Rock suburbs, killing five people and injuring nearly 200 others before it lifted near Adams Field Airport in College Station. The storm traveled for about 27 miles and had a maximum width of .8 miles.
F1	N of Atkins to SW of Jerusalem to N of Cleveland	Pope, Conway, Van Buren	2130	17.5 miles (27.2 km)	In Pope County, a wood pallet plant, a tin shed, a hog farm, and a chicken farm were destroyed. A few homes also sustained roof damage. One trailer was overturned and destroyed, injuring a person. The tornado also destroyed a shed and a hog farm near Jerusalem. Extensive tree damage occurred in the Ozark National Forest.
F2	SE of Vimy Ridge	Saline	2135	2 miles (3.2 km)	Tornado formed just south of the Benton/Shannon Hills tornado and caused damage to homes in Vimy Ridge.
F2	S of College Station	Pulaski	2147	5 miles (8 km)	A second satellite tornado that formed south of the Benton/Shannon Hills tornado.
F2	N of Furlow	Lonoke	2202	2.3 miles (3.7 km)	One frame home was destroyed and a utility tower was blown down. Some homes sustained roof damage as well.
F1	SW of Shirley	Van Buren	2212	2.5 miles (4 km)	Tornado began northeast of Clinton. A couple of sheds were destroyed, and some homes sustained roof damage.
F0	E of Rushing	Stone	2222	0.5 miles (0.8 km)	Damage was limited to trees.
F1	E of Marcella	Stone, Independence	2250	4.5 miles (7.2 km)	Some trailers were damaged and trees were downed.
F3	NE of Patterson to NE of Hickory Ridge	Woodruff, Jackson, Cross, Poinsett	2254	19 miles (30.4 km)	In Woodruff County, a frame home and a hunting club were destroyed. There was heavy damage to several homes, grain bins, and a farm shop. In Jackson County, a house trailer was damaged and trees were downed. In Cross and Poinsett counties, the tornado damaged 67 homes and businesses, and a switching station was also destroyed. Numerous trees were downed as well.
F1	Cave City area	Sharp	2315	1 miles (1.6 km)	Damage was limited to trees.
F4	Lennie to SE of Rutherford, Tennessee	Mississippi, Dyer (TN), Gibson (TN)	0020	45 miles (72 km)	1 death – In Mississippi County, three mobile homes were destroyed or damaged. 190 homes and a high school were destroyed or damaged in Dyer County, where the fatality occurred. Worst damage occurred in the Lake Luanna community, near Dyersburg. Eight more homes were destroyed in Gibson County.
Source: Tornado History Project - March 1, 1997 Storm Data

== Notable tornadoes ==
The most significant and deadliest tornadoes recorded in the state were two F4s that were also the deadliest tornadoes of the outbreak. The tornadoes affected parts of Clark, Hot Spring, Saline and Pulaski counties, killing a total of 21 people. These tornadoes were accompanied by satellite tornadoes during portions of their lives, which caused additional damage in the Vimy Ridge and College Station areas, but they did not cause any additional fatalities. The two F4 tornadoes were produced by the same supercell thunderstorm that traveled through most of the state. The supercell alone killed 21 and injured several hundred others. Near the Tennessee border and across the Mississippi River, the same supercell produced three additional tornadoes, one of which killed a person near Dyersburg, Tennessee.

Another supercell north of the main storm produced several tornadoes north of Little Rock and Jonesboro. Among the towns affected was Marmaduke, which was also affected by an F3 tornado during the April 2, 2006 tornado outbreak.

== Aftermath ==
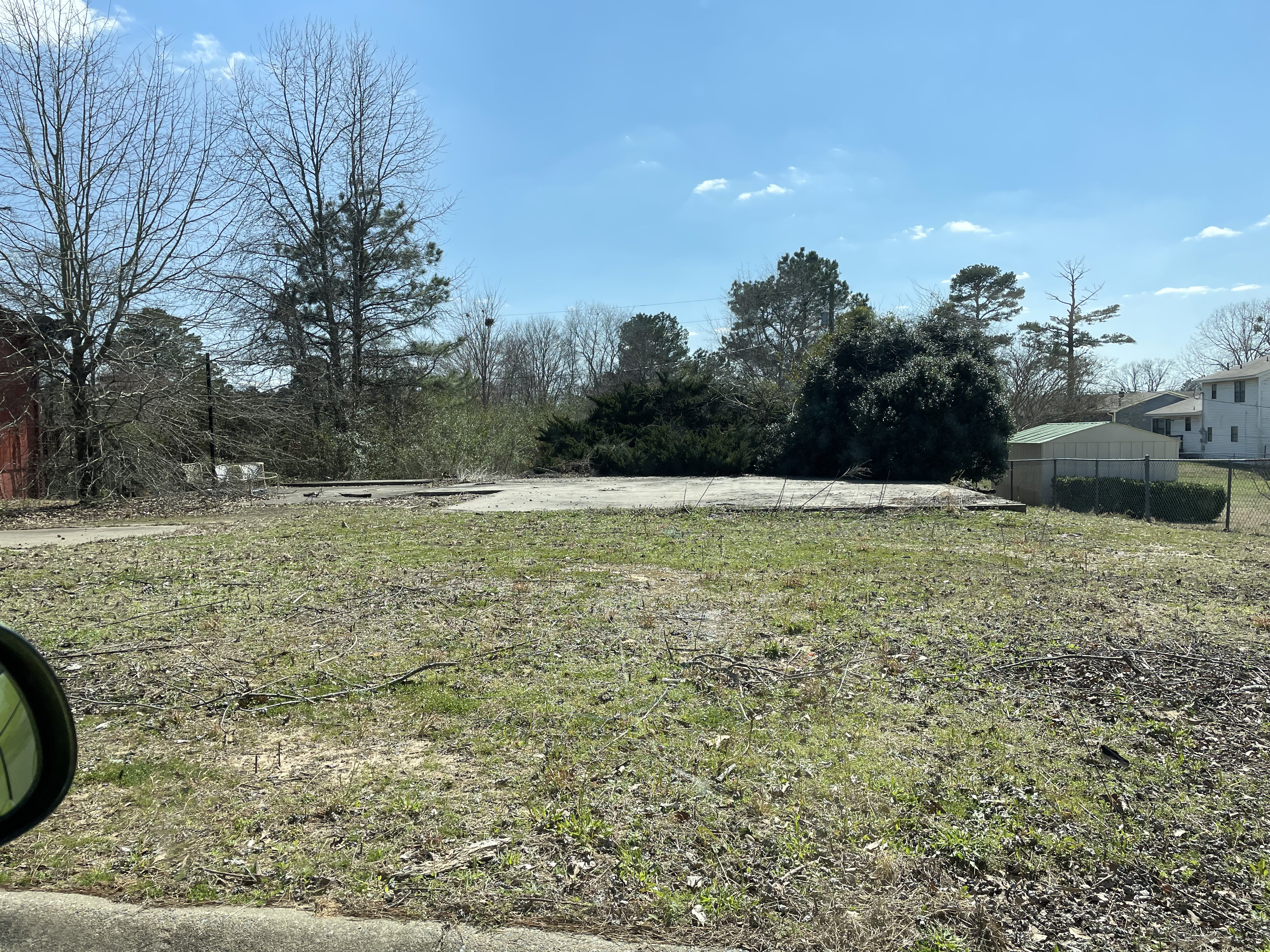
Multiple bare foundations can be found all over the Woodland Ridge subdivision of Little Rock, Arkansas. This foundation came from a house that was completely destroyed by the 1997 tornado, and still hasn't been rebuilt over 25 years later. (March 2022)

11 counties across Arkansas were declared federal disaster areas by then-US President Bill Clinton for tornadoes, with two others for flooding. Seven other counties in Tennessee were also declared disaster areas due to tornadoes. It was considered the worst tornado outbreak since the Palm Sunday tornado outbreak of 1994, which killed 42 across Alabama and Georgia. In Kentucky, then-governor Paul E. Patton had initially declared 120 counties a state of emergency and deployed about 1100 National Guard troops to the flood-stricken regions. In Indiana, the Ohio River overflow its banks due to record rains. All 13 counties along the river between Evansville and Cincinnati were also declared disaster areas. In West Virginia, then-Governor Cecil Underwood declared state of emergencies for 14 counties, and 16 were later declared disaster areas as over 4,000 homes and other structures were damaged by the flooding.

Overall, across the state of Arkansas 1,200 homes were damaged or destroyed, including close to 400 in Arkadelphia alone. Several areas that were hit by the tornadoes did not have any tornado sirens. After the outbreak several million dollars were invested to improve the siren system throughout the state for future tornado outbreaks, including the 2008 Super Tuesday tornado outbreak, a similar but much deadlier and more widespread outbreak. 14 people in Arkansas were killed by that outbreak on February 5, 2008, and nearly 60 in total were killed across the Mid-South regions of the US.

== See also ==
- List of North American tornadoes and tornado outbreaks
  - List of tornadoes with confirmed satellite tornadoes
- Tornado outbreak of March 13–16, 2025 - Another outbreak that would produce more than 1 (E)F4 tornadoes in Arkansas.
