= Jarrell tornado =

1997 F5 tornado

Coordinates: 30°50′13″N 97°37′18″W

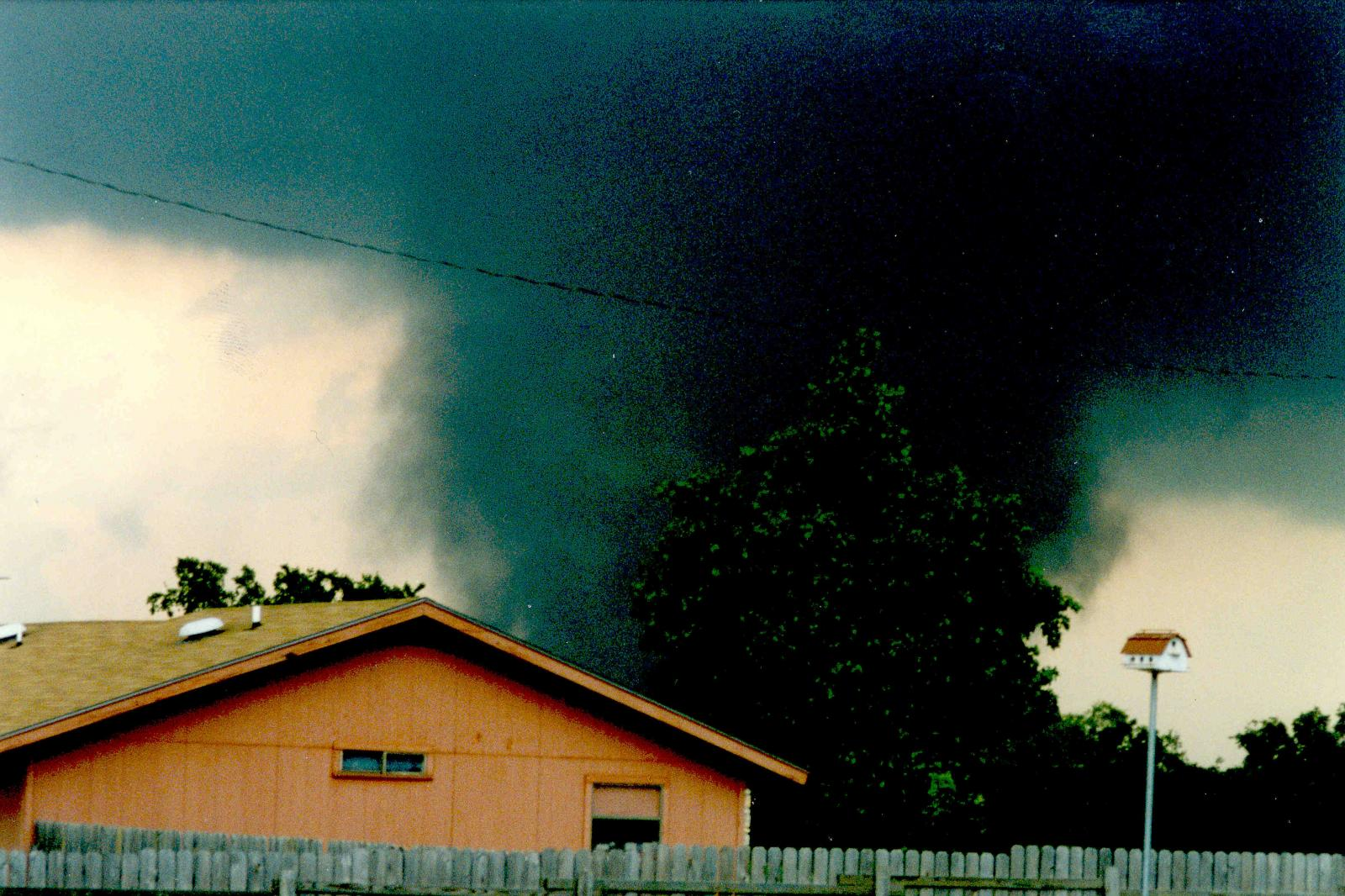
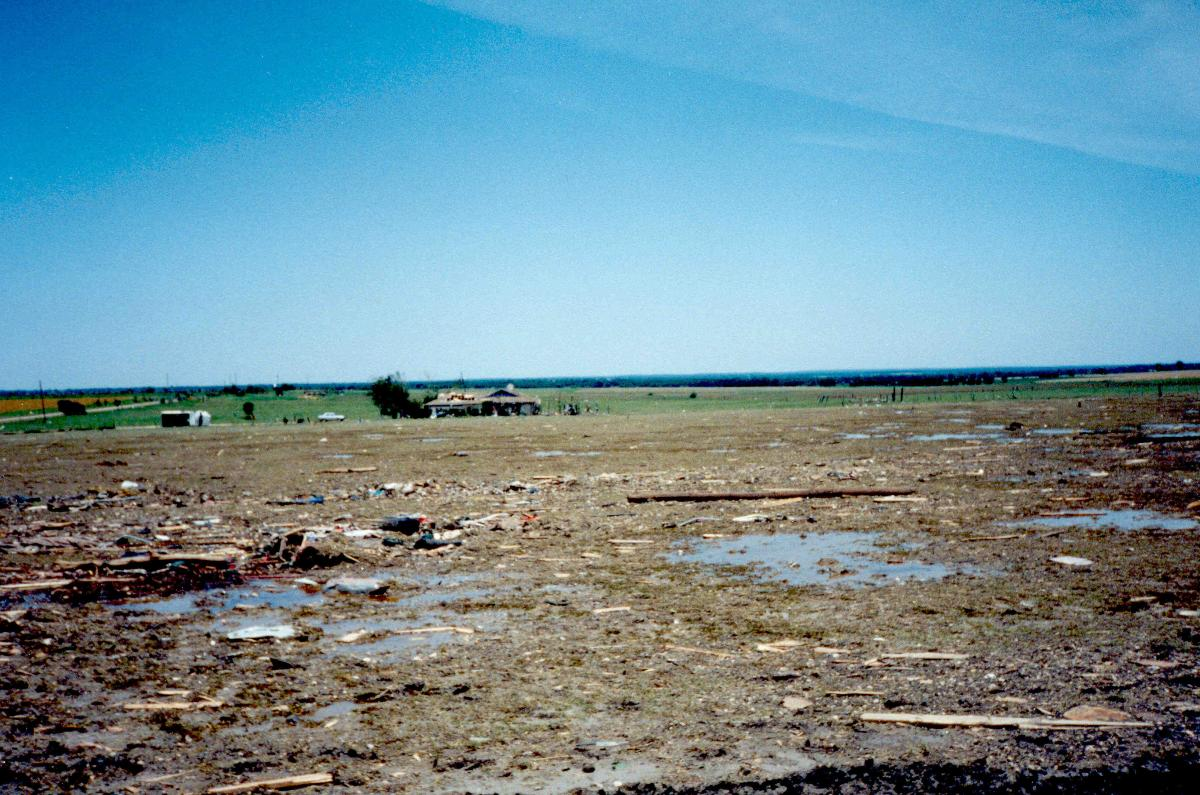
- Clockwise from top: View of the tornado as it moved near the Double Creek Estates area around 3:48 pm; F5 damage to the Double Creek Estates; a NEXRAD radar animation loop showing the southward progression of the supercell that produced the tornado

Meteorological history
- Formed: May 27, 1997, 3:40 pm. CDT (UTC−05:00)
- Dissipated: May 27, 1997, 3:53 pm. CDT (UTC−05:00)
- Duration: 13 minutes

F5 tornado
- on the Fujita scale
- Max width: 1,320 yd (0.75 mi; 1.21 km)
- Path length: 5.1 mi (8.2 km)
- Highest winds: >261 mph (420 km/h)

Overall effects
- Fatalities: 27
- Injuries: 13
- Damage: $40 million (1997 USD) $83 million (2026 USD)
- Areas affected: Jarrell, Texas and areas near Prairie Dell, Texas
- Part of the 1997 Central Texas tornado outbreak and tornadoes of 1997

In the afternoon hours of May 27, 1997, a large, slow-moving and violent F5 tornado caused extreme damage across portions of the Jarrell, Texas area. Known most frequently as the Jarrell tornado, it killed 27 residents in the Double Creek Estates, which at the time was a small subdivision located to the northwest of Jarrell, and inflicted approximately US$40 million in damages (equivalent to $80M in 2025) during its 13-minute, 5.1-mile (8.2 km) track. It occurred as part of a tornado outbreak across central Texas; it was produced by a supercell that had developed from an unstable airmass and favorable meteorological conditions at the time, including very high convective available potential energy (CAPE) values and warm dewpoints.

Several weaker tornadoes prior to the Jarrell tornado touched down and inflicted damage in nearby areas, particularly in Travis and Williamson counties. The National Weather Service office in Fort Worth issued several tornado warnings as a result, and later issued a tornado warning for the area encompassing Jarrell as the tornado-producing supercell approached the town. Shortly thereafter, within the Williamson County line, the tornado first touched down as a landspout before it transitioned into a larger multi-vortex tornado cloaked in dust. The landspout merged with the parent storm’s mesocyclone, becoming a violent mesocyclonic tornado, which then strengthened rapidly as its width grew. As the tornado moved through a neighborhood near Jarrell, it slowed down over the area while reaching its maximum width and producing violent F5-level winds. The tornado slowly moved over the neighborhood for approximately 3 minutes, producing some of the most extreme tornadic wind damage ever recorded. As the tornado left the subdivision, it began to weaken, before dissipating in a forested area. In total, 27 residents of Jarrell, as well as hundreds of cattle, were killed. The tornado left behind a path of devastation, including many houses and buildings that were swept clean from their foundations.

As of 2026, this tornado is Texas' most recent F5 or EF5 tornado. The tornado was the fourth-deadliest of the 1990s in the United States, only being surpassed by the 1990 Plainfield tornado that killed 29, the 1998 Oak Grove-Birmingham tornado that killed 32, and the 1999 Bridge Creek–Moore tornado that killed 36. It was the only F5 tornado of 1997.

== Meteorological synopsis ==
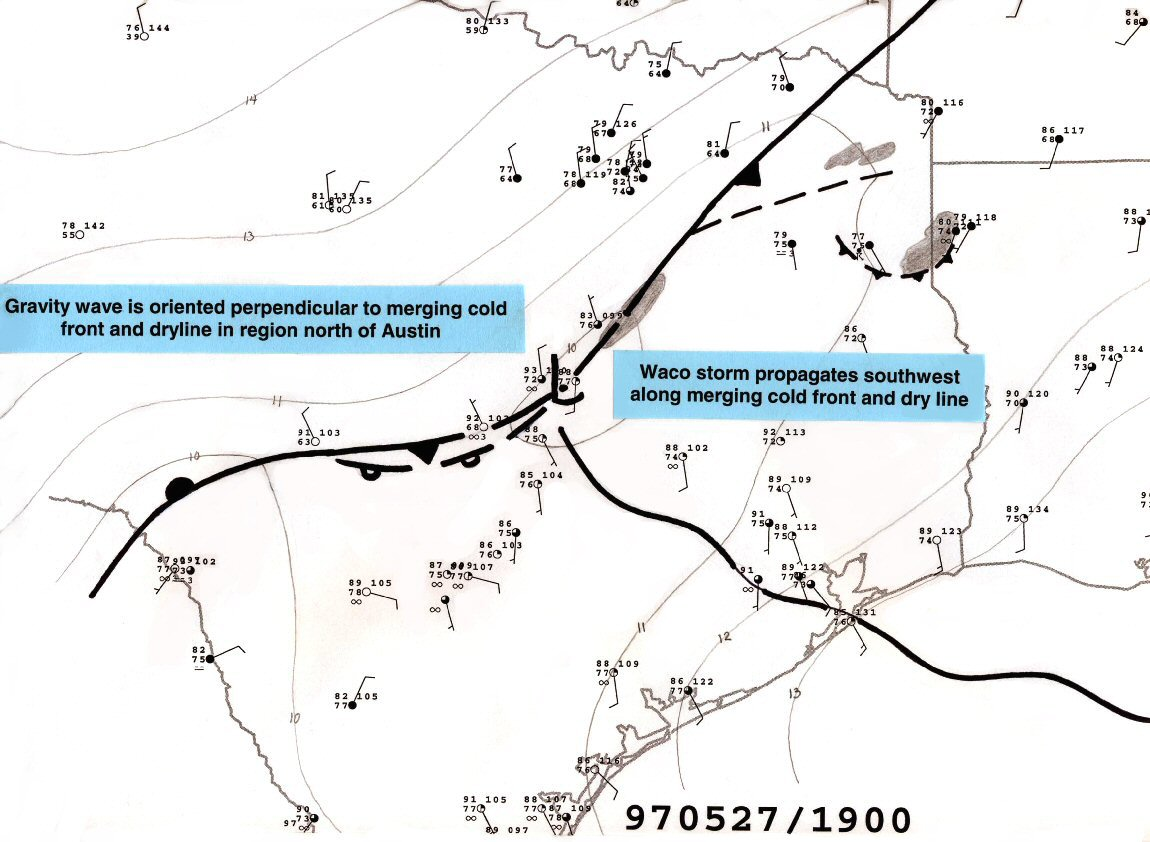
A surface weather analysis of Texas at 2:00 p.m. CDT on May 27 showing the cold front (solid line with pennants), dry line (dashed line with semicircles), gravity wave (solid line), and low-pressure area (L symbol). The alignment of these features produced the local environmental conditions enabling the tornado outbreak.

On the morning of May 27, 1997, an upper-level low-pressure area located over portions of South Dakota and Nebraska had moved northward which caused a weak, mid-level flow across Texas. While this occurred, a cold front extended southwest of a surface-based low-pressure area from Fayetteville, Arkansas to the Dallas–Fort Worth metroplex (DFW) to the Permian Basin, which also included two decaying outflow boundaries northeast of the DFW metroplex. A gravity wave was also noted from the cold front near Waco, Texas and southward, which would promote initiation of supercells, including the one which produced the Jarrell tornado. The latter two factors were caused by an overnight mesoscale convective system which had dissipated before the mesoscale setup of the Jarrell tornado.

An upper-air balloon sounding was conducted by the National Weather Service in Fort Worth while the cold front passed directly over the DFW metroplex, which showed favorable mid-level lapse rates, a dewpoint temperature of 73 °F (23 °C) on the surface, and some wind shear, though not towards the surface, which suggested non-tornadic supercell activity. However, a sounding launched from Calvert, Texas a few hours later revealed surface-based CAPE values above 6500 J/kg, up from 3000 J/kg shown by the sounding previously launched over the DFW metroplex. This, along with extremely high CAPE values shown near the surface from a sounding over Waco at 12:00 CDT (17:00 UTC), likely caused vorticity near and along the cold front and the production of the Jarrell tornado.

The supercell that produced the Jarrell tornado first developed in McLennan County before noon, initially moving slowly southwestward in the unstable airmass. Shortly thereafter, a tornado watch was issued by the Storm Prediction Center for eastern Texas and western Louisiana. As the thunderstorm cell moved parallel to Interstate 35, it rapidly intensified and prompted the issuance of a severe thunderstorm warning for portions of McLennan County at 12:50 CDT (17:50 UTC), later being upgraded to a tornado warning as the supercell then began to rapidly exhibit lower-levels of rotation. This would result in multiple tornadoes being produced before the Jarrell tornado occurred; most notably an F3 tornado which caused severe damage in portions of Falls County near Bruceville-Eddy and Lake Belton. Another tornado, rated an F0, touched down near Stillhouse Dam and was incorrectly claimed as the Jarrell tornado due to its close proximity from the F5 tornado's path.

Shortly thereafter, the supercell began to move slightly westward towards Jarrell and Salado while continuing to show signs of rapid, low-level rotation. This would result in another tornado warning being issued by the National Weather Service in Austin/San Antonio for Williamson County, including Jarrell, at 15:30 CDT (22:30 UTC), in response to the storm's approach to the town. The warning was in effect for a duration of one hour, and local warning sirens in the town went off an estimated 10–12 minutes before the impact. Multiple short-lived, small, and rope-like funnel clouds preceded the Jarrell tornado; and despite being theorized and commonly accepted as being separate tornadoes, there is a possibility that these were part of it. Additionally, some reports stated an F1 tornado near Prairie Dell as an earlier continuation of this tornado.

== Tornado summary ==
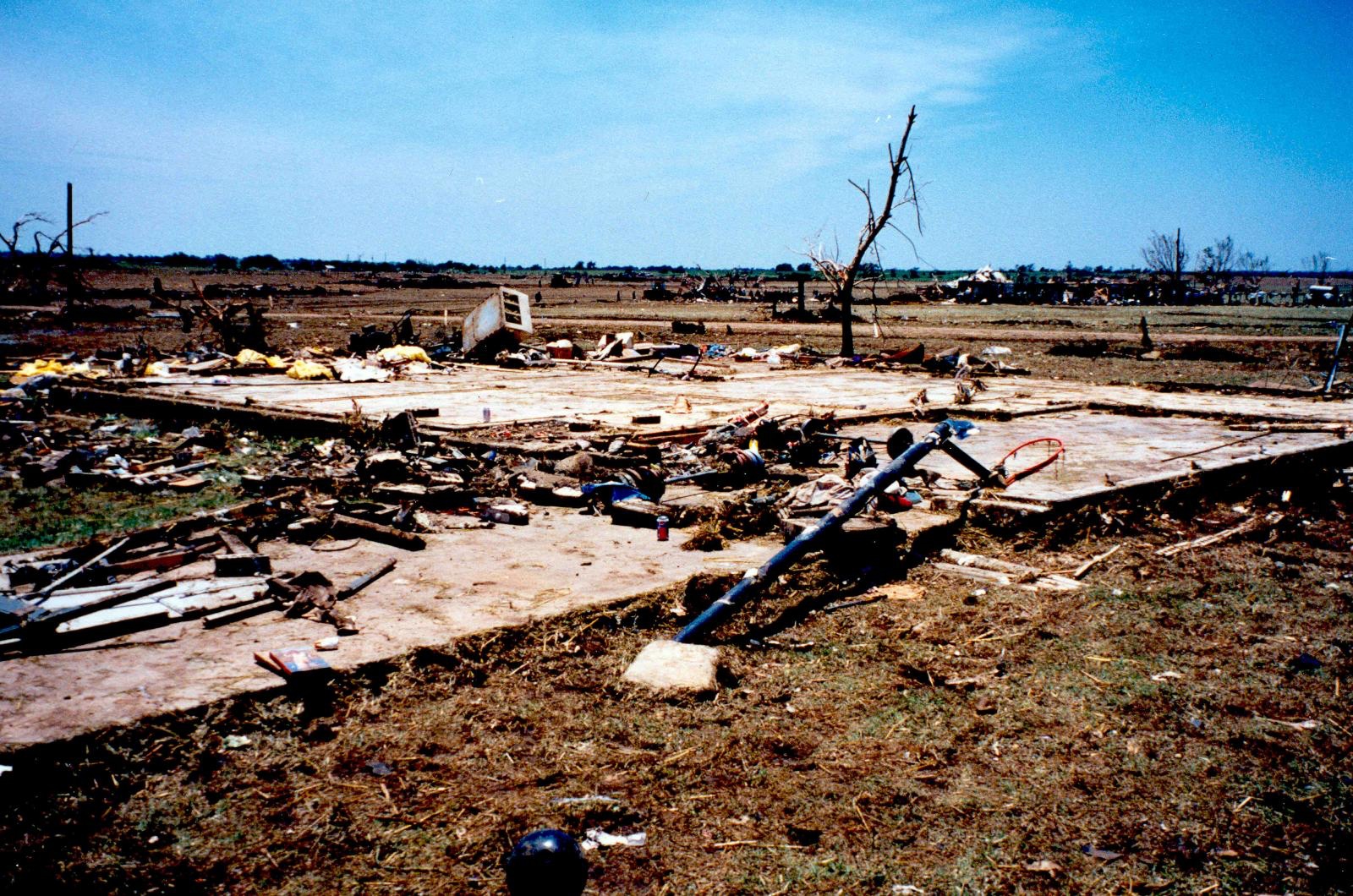
Slab foundation of a house that was swept away at Double Creek Estates, with anchor bolts visible and scoured grass nearby.

The tornado officially touched down within the Williamson County line 3 miles (4.8 km) north of Jarrell as a narrow rope landspout tornado at 3:40 pm CDT (20:40 UTC). The tornado began to undergo a rapid intensification as it attached itself to the mesocyclone within the parent supercell. It quickly transitioned from a landspout to a powerful mesocyclonic tornado, and began to morph and widen, taking on a large multi-vortex structure. Traffic along Interstate 35 came to a stop as the tornado came into view nearby; the Texas Highway Patrol also stopped traffic on both sides of the interstate under the expectation that the tornado would cross the highway. However, it instead moved parallel to Interstate 35 without impacting the roadway. Tracking south-southwest, the tornado quickly intensified and grew in width, becoming large and violent. The exact size of the tornado was difficult to determine during this portion of the tornado's life. Its intense winds scoured the ground, shredded vegetation, and stripped pavement from three county roads; the thickness of the asphalt pavement was estimated to be 3 inches (7.6 cm). A culvert plant near the intersection of two county roads collapsed. Nearby, a similar plant and a mobile home sustained some damage, with the latter struck by a 2×4'' piece of lumber. Some of the most extreme damage in this area was inflicted to a small metal-framed recycling plant that was directly hit and obliterated, with only the foundation and a few twisted and bent metal beams remaining. Multiple people were sheltering in a mobile home south of the recycling plant, but later decided to evacuate to a frame house to take cover. The frame house was directly hit and completely destroyed by the tornado moments later, killing everyone inside, while the mobile home was only sideswiped by the tornado and sustained minor damage.

The tornado turned slightly around 3:48 pm, entering the Double Creek Estates at violent F5 intensity. It grew to its maximum width, estimated to be 3/4 mile (1.2 km). Post-event surveys and eyewitness accounts reported that the tornado began to slow its forward movement. The tornado immediately began to destroy structures and homes as it hit multiple streets at the northeastern edge of the housing development. A recovered clock and synced videos marked the start of the tornado's impact on the subdivision at 3:48 pm. The entirety of Double Creek Estates was subject to extreme winds for three minutes due to the slow forward movement of the tornado. All homes on Double Creek Drive and in other parts of the subdivision, some well-built and properly bolted, were completely swept away, leaving only bare concrete foundation slabs behind, and the remaining foundations of several homes in the direct path of the tornado had their plumbing and sill plates ripped away. In the hardest hit areas of Double Creek Estates, homes were so thoroughly obliterated that there was virtually no recoverable debris left behind, and what debris was left had been finely granulated into small fragments and dispersed over a wide area. Grass was completely scoured from lawns throughout the neighborhood, and nearby grassy fields also sustained extreme ground scouring of up to 18 inches (46 cm) in depth, leaving behind a wide swath of mud and bare soil.

As a result of this, the tornado's damage path was heavily studied due to its visibility from the extensive ground scouring. Additionally, the tornado lifted and threw numerous vehicles at Double Creek Estates, which were either mangled beyond recognition or torn apart. At least six hardly recognizable cars were found over 300 yards (270 m) away, completely crushed and left caked in mud and scoured grass. Several other vehicles were never recovered, and are presumed to have been torn into numerous pieces inside the tornado. Trees of all sizes in the subdivision were completely debarked, with one small tree documented to have had an electrical cord pierced through its trunk. There were 38 structures in Double Creek Estates that were destroyed; three businesses adjacent to the neighborhood were also completely demolished. In total, the tornado dealt $10–20 million (1997 USD) in damage to Double Creek Estates.

After exiting the Double Creek Estates area, the tornado then crossed over a county road while paralleling Spears Ranch Road. The damage in these outlying areas was sporadic: in one case, a mobile home suffered only minor damage while a nearby house lost its roof and several exterior walls. The road's guardrail was impaled by wooden planks. After continuing into a cedar tree forest, it began to rapidly weaken, crossing over Appaloosa Cove Road before dissipating. The National Centers for Environmental Information (NCEI) concluded that it had lifted at 3:53 pm, remaining on the ground for 13 minutes and traversing 5.1 miles (8.2 km).

=== "Dead man walking" photograph ===
The "Dead Man Walking" photograph taken by Scott Beckwith outside of Jarrell Farm Supply as the tornado was mid-tornadogenesis.

The Jarrell tornado was the subject of a well-known photograph, now known as the "Dead Man Walking". It was taken by Scott Beckwith, a worker at Jarrell Farm Supply. The picture became known for its resemblance to the grim reaper, a figure that commonly represents death in several cultures.

The image consists of the tornado, shrouded in debris, with the main vortex and an adjacent subvortex making "leg" shapes near the bottom of the tornado, giving it the appearance of a giant silhouette walking across the ground. A third subvortex separate from the main funnel is also seen, taking the appearance of what looks like a scythe-like blade. The image, which is just one in a sequence of 8 photographs taken right as the tornado grew in size, has been widely called an example of pareidolia.

The photo has received international attention and the Jarrell tornado has popularized the "Dead Man Walking" nickname for similar multi-vortex tornadoes with "legs".

== Impact and casualties ==
The tornado overall resulted in the total destruction of numerous homes and structures, and destroyed an estimated 40 family residences. Of these estimated 40 homes, most of them were completely swept away. Many of the structures that were swept away were located in the Double Creek Estates. The damage from the tornado was classified as F5 severity throughout most of the tornado's path. Approximately $40 million in damage was inflicted upon property with another $100,000 (1997 USD) inflicted upon crops.

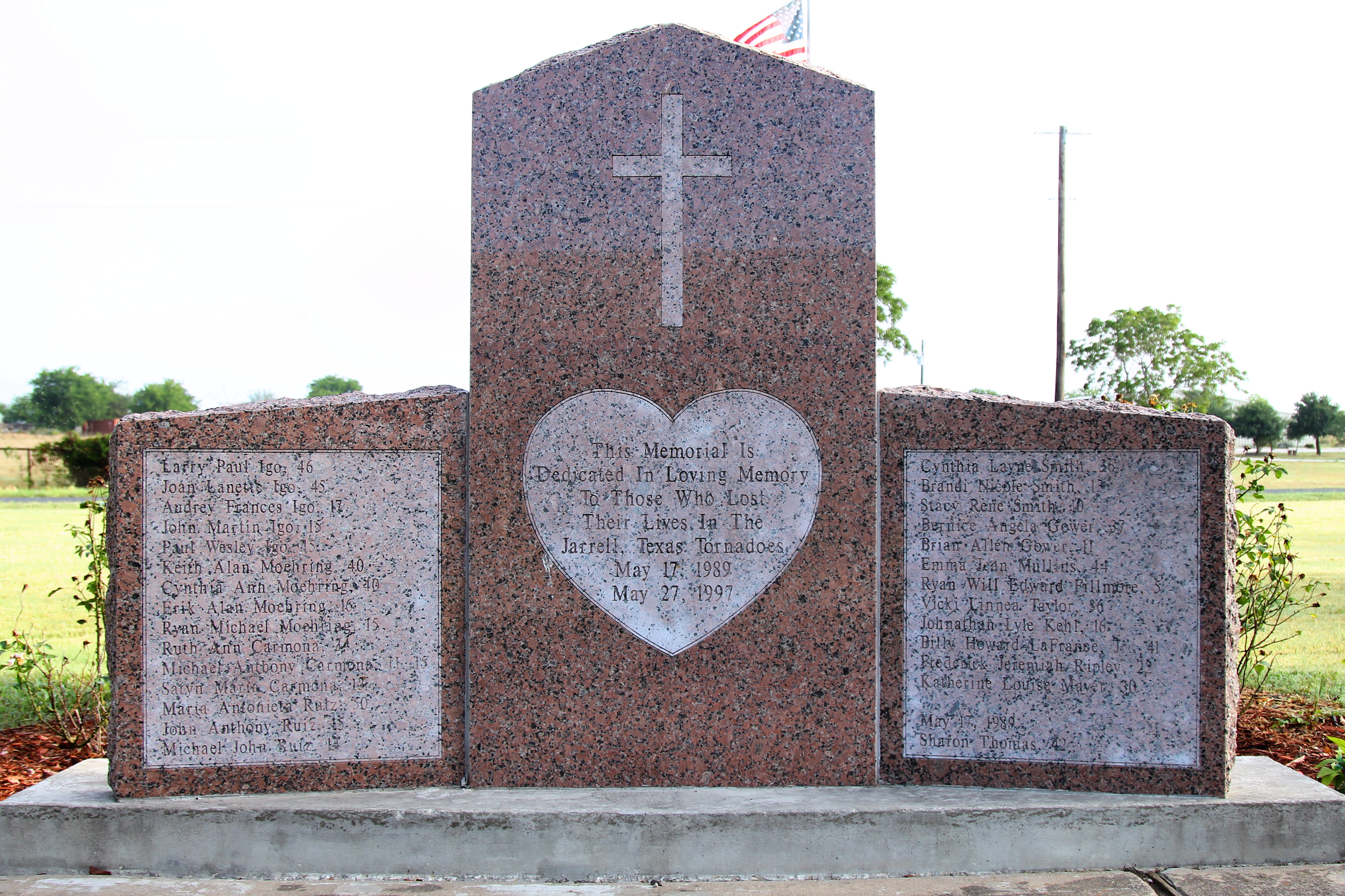
A memorial for the victims of the tornado, and another tornado that hit Jarrell in 1989.

Out of the 131 residents who lived in or near Double Creek Estates, 31 were initially believed to have been killed, but that number was lowered to 27. The remains of these people were found at over 30 locations, and the majority of the deaths were reported in the Morbidity and Mortality Weekly Report as being caused by bodily and head trauma and one fatality was reported to have been caused by asphyxia. Some of the bodies were identified through the use of dental records. The physical trauma inflicted on some of the tornado victims was so extreme that first responders reportedly had difficulty distinguishing human remains from the remains of animals at the sites, as the remains were reportedly torn apart and rendered unrecognizable in the winds of the tornado. In fact, many first responders and assistant personnel have reported to having PTSD-like symptoms after the search. The sheer strength and intensity of the tornado, as it was in Jarrell, gave the people in its direct path little time to get to safety. Most of the homes that were located in Double Creek Estates at the time were constructed on a slab foundation and lacked basements. Up to nineteen people had sought refuge in a single storm cellar.

Many residents of the Double Creek Estates had followed the recommended safety procedures, but were still killed because of the strength of the tornado. Some people had chosen to evacuate ahead of the tornado, which may have saved lives. Despite the near-complete destruction of houses on the edge of the tornado, some walls were left standing, protecting several residents. One survivor holed up in a bathtub and was flung several hundred feet from her house onto a road.

Three entire families were killed in the Double Creek Estates area: the Igo family (five members), the Smith family (three members) and the Moehring family (four members). An additional thirteen people were reportedly transported to a hospital after the event; most of the wounded had abrasions and lacerations due to debris from the tornado. Nine families in Jarrell had more than one member die in the tornado, and the youngest victim was five years old.

Around 300 cattle grazing in a nearby pasture were killed and some were found 0.25 miles (400 m) away. Hundreds of carcasses were found dismembered, lacking limbs, decapitated or skinned.

== Aftermath ==
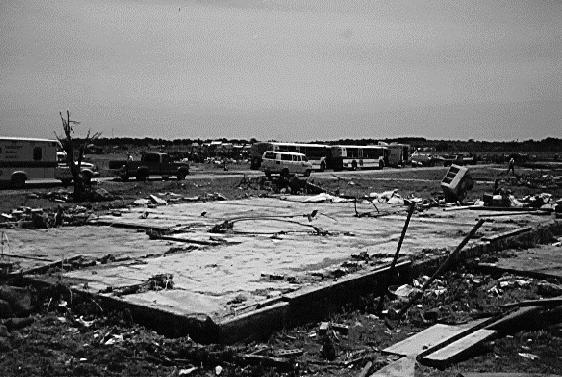
A house that was completely swept away by the tornado.

Within minutes after the tornado's impact, emergency management, police, and other volunteers began search-and-rescue operations in Jarrell. Numerous different agencies assisted in the search-and-rescue process, including the Texas Department of Public Safety Police, Texas National Guard, and other smaller agencies. Relief operations, which covered 211 homes and persons damaged or wounded in the tornado, cost an estimated $250,000 (1997 USD); community donations covered at least $200,000 (1997 USD) of the expenses. The tornado knocked out power in Jarrell, effectively stunting communications between emergency services and residents. Cell phones were not functional, and families of affected residents became increasingly concerned due to an inability to communicate. During the emergency response to the affected areas, emergency services almost drove past Double Creek Estates, unaware that houses had stood there. The Double Creek Estates subdivision quickly became the focal point of search-and-rescue and recovery efforts, which were aided by civilians and volunteer workers.

The Jarrell Volunteer Fire Department organized a temporary morgue. Although a death toll of 30 people was initially reported, that figure was later revised to a final tally of 27. A memorial park, which includes twenty-seven trees to commemorate the victims, was built in the Double Creek Estates area. Many impacted people in Double Creek Estates remained in the general area amid recovery efforts stemming from the tornado.

Then-governor of Texas George W. Bush declared Williamson County a disaster area, later stating during a visit to Jarrell on May 28 that it was "the worst tornado I've ever seen". U.S. Senator Kay Bailey Hutchison also visited Jarrell and Cedar Park. Bush later requested federal aid for Williamson and Bell counties with support from Hutchinson. The Federal Emergency Management Agency elected not to provide federal aid, citing the contributions from private and state sources. Instead, the Small Business Administration and U.S. Department of Agriculture made available loans for the rebuilding of homes, farms, and ranches. Between May 29 and June 1, the Office of the Federal Coordinator for Meteorological Services and Supporting Research carried out aerial and ground surveys of the tornadic damage in Texas in coordination with the Texas Wing Civil Air Patrol.

In the six days following the event, the Office of the Federal Coordinator for Meteorological Services and Supporting Research conducted multiple surveys from the air and on the ground to survey the track of the tornado and the damage caused by it. In coordination from the Civil Air Patrol in the state, the tornado received an F5 rating. As of 2025, it remains the southernmost F5/EF5 tornado confirmed in the United States.

=== Benefit Concert ===
On June 5, 1997, a benefit concert was arranged for the tornado victims by Austin radio station KLBJ/93.7 FM. The concert was held at the Austin Music Hall in Austin, Texas. The performance included bands such as Toadies, Tripping Daisy, and Jackopierce. It drew 3,000 attendees and raised $67,000.

== Case studies and documentation ==
There have been multiple in-depth case studies conducted on the tornado since May 1997, most of which covered the impacts to structures and victims as well as the conditions that produced it.

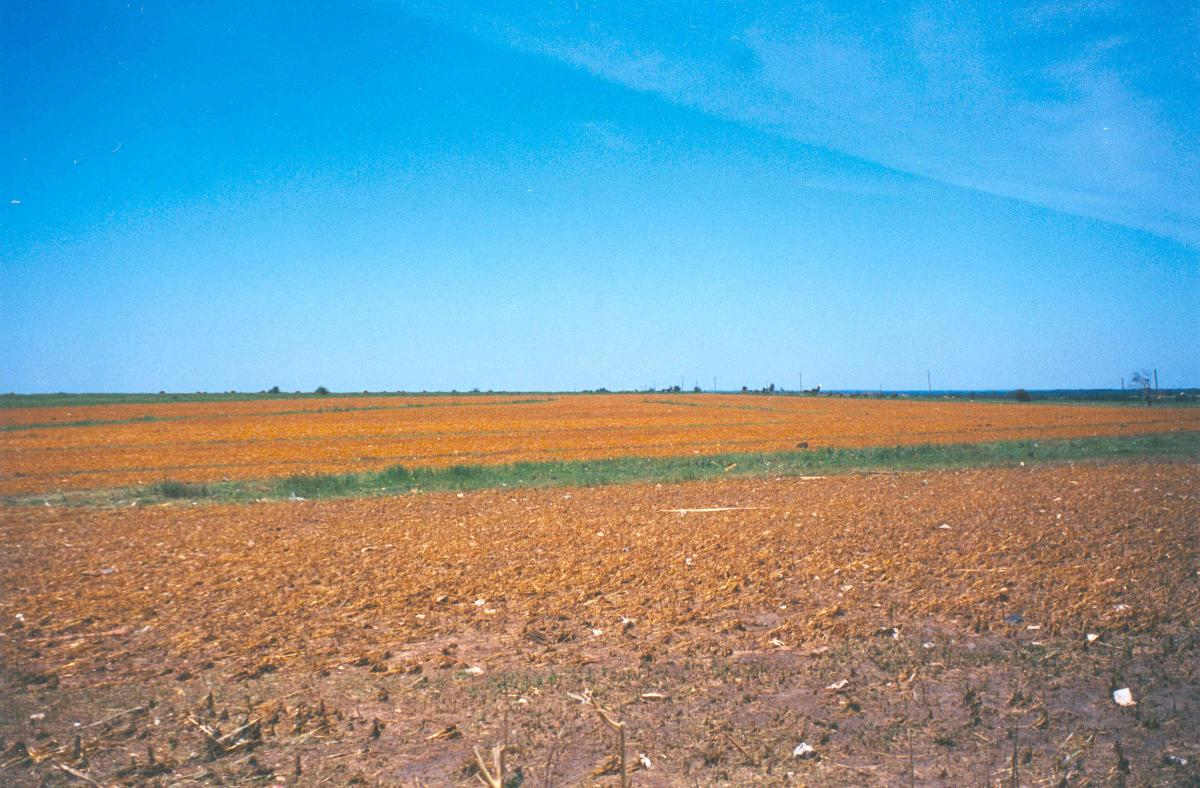
Ground scouring produced by the tornado outside of the Double Creek Estates.

=== National Institute of Standards and Technology (NIST) ===
A case study and critique was published by the National Institute of Standards and Technology, which covered the structural damage caused by the tornado and the track that it left. The NIST also published a detailed critique of the Fujita Scale as a direct result of the Jarrell tornado. The critique claimed that the Fujita scale failed to account for critical pointers in the assessment of the Jarrell tornado for two engineering factors: the structural construction quality and the specific winds speeds at the specific locations that were surveyed by the National Weather Service. The case study concluded that few randomly inspected homes at Double Creek Estates did have small structural integrity issues, which includes factors such as a lack of sufficient anchor bolts and steel straps in the house foundations.

=== University of Wisconsin-Madison ===
The University of Wisconsin-Madison also published a case study on the event, authored by Andrew Mankowski, which detailed the weather conditions that caused the tornado to form and how it became as violent as it was. The study said that several meteorological conditions were responsible for the tornado being produced, due in part of a cold front, frontogenesis, and a very unstable warm air mass that had convective available potential energy (CAPE) values topping 6000 J/kg. The latter factor, according to Mankowski, contributed to directional shear which formed the supercells. This caused the violent rotation that eventually produced the Jarrell tornado, and the subsequent strength of it.

=== Centers for Disease Control and Prevention (CDC) ===
The Centers for Disease Control and Prevention (CDC), a U.S. government-affiliated disease control group, produced a study on the casualties of the tornado, including in-depth explanations of the injuries sustained to the bodies of victims and lengths of hospital stays of them. The study and survey concluded that thirty-three people were transported to area hospitals with various injuries, with the most common ones lacerations, contusions, and abrasions. It also noted the lack of shelters that had caused some of the fatalities, and recommended that more storm shelters be installed in Jarrell.

=== Other studies ===
Numerous other groups and organizations conducted small case studies and surveys in the wake of the tornado, including the Federal Emergency Management Agency (FEMA) and the Regional and Mesocale Meteorology Branch (RaMMB). The American Meteorological Society (AMS) also conducted a case study on the event, discussing the meteorological conditions that caused the event and the significance of the Jarrell tornado. A small case study by the NOAA had concluded that the Emergency Alert System (EAS) was not activated in a timely manner to warn about the tornado. Many warning systems had also failed, and the study recommended that emergency alerts and tornado warnings be issued earlier.

=== Rating controversy ===
While the 1997 Jarrell tornado caused some of the worst damage ever recorded, studies have shown its F5 rating may have been too high. A 1998 study argues that damage could be explained by an F3 tornado. The quality of construction, defined as degree of conformity to applicable standards requirements, was found to be poor in quality:

We report damage observations and conclude on their basis that the worst damage can be explained by wind speeds 'corresponding' to an F3 rating on the Fujita tornado intensity scale (wind speeds of 71 m/s to 92 m/s). An F4 (93 m/s to 116 m/s) rating, or the F5 (117 m/s to 142 m/s) rating officially issed by the National Weather Service (NWS)

== See also ==
- List of disasters in the United States by death toll
- List of North American tornadoes and tornado outbreaks
- List of F5 and EF5 tornadoes

=== External links ===
- Media related to 1997 Jarrell tornado at Wikimedia Commons
