= Tornado outbreak of January 23–24, 1997 =

United States natural disaster

Meteorological history
- Duration: January 23–24, 1997

Tornado outbreak
- Tornadoes: 16 confirmed
- Max. rating: F4 tornado
- Duration: 2 days

Overall effects
- Casualties: 1 fatality, 43 injuries
- Damage: $16.771 million
- Areas affected: Tennessee, Alabama, Kentucky, Louisiana, Mississippi, Texas

The tornado outbreak of January 23–24, 1997 resulted in 16 tornadoes across the Deep South. Damage in excess of $16 million occurred across several states, with the worst damage in Tennessee and Alabama. Over 300 buildings, including homes, businesses, and public facilities were either damaged or completely destroyed. An F2 tornado killed one person in Tuscaloosa, Alabama. The strongest storm in the outbreak was an F4 tornado that destroyed dozens of homes in and near Murfreesboro, Tennessee.

== Meteorological synopsis ==
On January 23, an upper-level trough moved across the Great Plains with a front stalled over portions of Texas and Louisiana, prompting the Storm Prediction Center to forecast a slight risk of severe thunderstorms across the Gulf Coast states. Two tornadoes, rated F1 and F2 respectively, damaged homes in Texas and Louisiana.

On January 24, 1997, the trough continued across the Mississippi and Tennessee valleys. A warm and moist airmass covered much of central Alabama. Morning temperatures across most of the state were in the lower 60's with a dewpoint of approximately 60 °F (15-16 °C). Meanwhile, a warm front was moving from Louisiana and into central and southwest Alabama. By noon, the skies had begun to darken as a cold front trailed over areas of northeast Texas. These conditions prompted the Storm Prediction Center to issue a moderate risk outlook across portions of Louisiana, Mississippi, and Alabama with a slight risk outlook covering a region from Louisiana to Tennessee, North Carolina, and Florida.

The threat of severe weather across middle Tennessee was first identified by the early afternoon of January 23. A special weather statement was issued to highlight the severe weather threat for middle Tennessee for the afternoon of January 24. Another special weather statement was issued early on January 24 to continue to alert the public of the possibility of severe weather.

The tornado outbreak unfolded quickly across middle Tennessee during the early afternoon of January 24. Shortly after 330 PM, Doppler weather radar indicated a tornado as severe weather spotters reported a funnel cloud just east of Centerville, Tennessee. A tornado warning was issued at 333 PM for northern Maury and Williamson Counties as the tornado moved toward the more heavily populated area of Franklin. By 344 PM, another tornado warning was issued for Maury County as another tornado was indicated by Doppler weather radar in western Maury County, about 15 miles west of Columbia.

By 422 PM, a tornado warning was issued for Rutherford and extended for Williamson County until 515 PM. Three tornadoes were indicated by Doppler weather radar from about 10 miles northeast and 5 miles west of Franklin, Tennessee and also along the Maury-Williamson County line. Several weather spotters, amateur radio operators, and sheriffs' deputies were maintaining contact with NWSO Nashville and provided excellent updates of the tornadoes, which coincided with Doppler weather radar indications.

A very important severe weather statement was issued shortly after 430 PM highlighting the multiple tornadoes in Williamson County. This statement provided crucial information regarding areas within the Nashville metropolitan area which were in the paths of the tornadoes (including heavily populated areas such as Murfreesboro in Rutherford County).

At 440 PM, the northernmost tornado about 5 miles northeast of Franklin continued to maintain itself, prompting a tornado warning for Wilson county valid until 545 PM.

Another crucial severe weather statement was issued at 454 PM to indicate tornado locations and to pinpoint towns along the tornado paths. This particular statement mentioned that tornadoes would move to near Murfreesboro between 500 and 515 and to just southeast of Lebanon by 515 PM.

At around 500 PM, an F2 tornado touched down near Smyrna in Rutherford County causing damage to Smyrna Middle as it moved southeast of Lebanon in Wilson County to near Watertown in southeast Wilson County at the predicted 515 PM time. Rutherford County residents had a 48-minute tornado warning lead time and Wilson county a 20-minute lead time.

== Confirmed tornadoes ==
Confirmed tornadoes by Fujita rating
FU	F0	F1	F2	F3	F4	F5	Total
0	2	4	9	0	1	0	16

=== January 23 event ===
List of confirmed tornadoes – Thursday, January 23, 1997 (Note: All dates are based on the local time zone where the tornado touched down; however, all times are in Coordinated Universal Time for consistency.)
F#	Location	County / Parish	State	Start Coord.	Time (UTC)	Path length	Max width	Summary
F1	South of Elkhart	Anderson	TX	31.57°N 95.58°W	23:23–23:25	1 mi (1.6 km)	30 yd (27 m)	The tornado destroyed a mobile home where four people were injured and caused minor roof damage to another home. Trees were snapped and uprooted.
F2	Rambin	Desoto	LA	31.95°N 93.45°W	01:15–01:23	5 mi (8.0 km)	400 yd (370 m)	Four houses sustained major damage while others were damaged by falling trees. A mobile home was lifted and blown 100 yd (91 m). Numerous trees were twisted, snapped, and uprooted.

=== January 24 event ===
List of confirmed tornadoes – Friday, January 24, 1997
F#	Location	County / Parish	State	Start Coord.	Time (UTC)	Path length	Max width	Summary
F1	W of Jean Lafitte to Crown Point	Jefferson	LA	29.73°N 90.13°W	12:05–12:15	4 mi (6.4 km)	10 yd (9.1 m)	The tornado moved along an intermittent path. Two mobile homes suffered major damage and were pushed off their foundations while three others suffered minor damage. One house had roof damage while three others had damage to their porches, gutters, and siding. Part of the metal roof of the auditorium in Jean Lafitte was torn off.
F1	N of Elmore	Elmore	AL	32.55°N 86.32°W	13:37–13:40	1.5 mi (2.4 km)	50 yd (46 m)	A small tornado damaged several house roofs and two mobile homes, and destroyed at least one shed.
F1	S of Moulton	Lawrence	AL	34.33°N 87.28°W	20:50–20:55	3 mi (4.8 km)	75 yd (69 m)	The tornado touched down in the William B. Bankhead National Forest. Most of the damage was to trees, but buildings near a lookout tower were also damaged.
F2	Smyrna to NE of Alexandria	Rutherford, Wilson	TN	35.98°N 86.53°W	22:37–23:28	29.7 mi (47.8 km)	440 yd (400 m)	In Rutherford County the tornado tore roofs from homes in two subdivision. The middle school, four apartments, two mobile homes, and three houses were damaged in Smyrna. In Wilson County the tornado destroyed seven homes, seven mobile homes, and a dozen barns. The collapse of one barn killed 100 hogs. One woman was injured when the tornado turned her car around and blew out the windows.
F2	E of Lewisburg to NE of Wheel	Marshall, Wilson	TN	35.45°N 86.70°W	22:38–23:00	6.9 mi (11.1 km)	60 yd (55 m)	The tornado damaged mobile homes near Belfast. A home and a barn were damaged elsewhere in Marshall County. In the Wheel area, one home and two mobile homes were destroyed. Three homes, one mobile home, and a general store were destroyed. Three people suffered minor injuries.
F2	NE of Dellrose	Lincoln	TN	35.13°N 86.78°W	22:50–22:58	4.2 mi (6.8 km)	200 yd (180 m)	Three homes were completely destroyed and nine were damaged. Fourteen outbuildings and a house trailer were damaged.
F4	SW of Murfreesboro to NE of Barfield	Rutherford	TN	35.78°N 86.50°W	23:00–23:12	6.5 mi (10.5 km)	300 yd (270 m)	The tornado initially touched down at F1 intensity southwest of Murfreesboro, where it damaged a barn, snapped trees, and overturned a trailer. The tornado intensified as it approached Barfield, tearing the roof off one home and partially destroying several others. In all 44 homes were destroyed and 47 were damaged in the Barfield area. The tornado reached peak intensity in the Southridge subdivision, where about half a dozen homes were completely destroyed. It then struck an apartment building and weakened to F1 intensity. The tornado continued snapping trees and damaging homes and businesses on the south side of Murfreesboro before dissipating. Eighteen people were injured.
F2	Tuscaloosa	Tuscaloosa	AL	33.13°N 87.57°W	23:00–23:15	10 mi (16 km)	200 yd (180 m)	1 death – See section on this tornado.
F0	SW of Portland	Sumner	TN	36.58°N 86.55°W	23:05	0.3 mi (0.48 km)	10 yd (9.1 m)	The tornado was reported by a Skywarn spotter and did no damage.
F2	Brush Creek to Bloomington Springs	Smith, Putnam	TN	36.12°N 85.78°W	23:28–00:00	22.3 mi (35.9 km)	440 yd (400 m)	In Smith County most of the damage was in the Brush Creek area. The tornado destroyed twenty-two outbuildings, seven houses, seven mobile homes, eleven vehicles, and a cattle trailer. Forty-three other structures and seven vehicles were damaged in Smith County and numerous trees and power lines were downed. In Putnam County the tornado was rated F1, with damage to eight structures. The tornado moved from Buffalo Valley to Gentry to Bloomington Springs. Six people were injured in Smith County, none seriously.
F2	SE of Pleasant Ridge to NE of Smithville	Cannon, DeKalb	TN	35.92°N 86.00°W	23:33–23:54	18.3 mi (29.5 km)	440 yd (400 m)	In Cannon County the tornado destroyed one house and damaged ten other houses, two mobile homes, and numerous sheds and outbuildings. Two people were injured. Numerous trees were downed, blocking portions of Tennessee State Route 53. In DeKalb County the tornado damaged twelve homes, three barns, and many sheds and outbuildings.
F2	Mount Union	Jackson	TN	36.25°N 85.53°W	00:08–00:13	3.8 mi (6.1 km)	100 yd (91 m)	The tornado destroyed four houses, six mobile homes, and numerous barns and outbuildings. Another six houses and two mobile homes were damaged.
F0	NE of Banner	Calhoun	MS	34.13°N 89.37°W	00:20–00:22	0.1 mi (0.16 km)	10 yd (9.1 m)	The tornado briefly touched town and caused little damage.
F2	S of Glasgow to Wisdom	Barren, Metcalfe	KY	36.98°N 85.90°W	00:40–00:54	7 mi (11 km)	600 yd (550 m)	The tornado damaged forty homes and several mobile homes. The middle section of a $275,000 home was completely destroyed. Numerous large trees were downed in a convergent pattern. Two people were injured, one seriously.

=== Tuscaloosa, Alabama ===
Tuscaloosa, Alabama
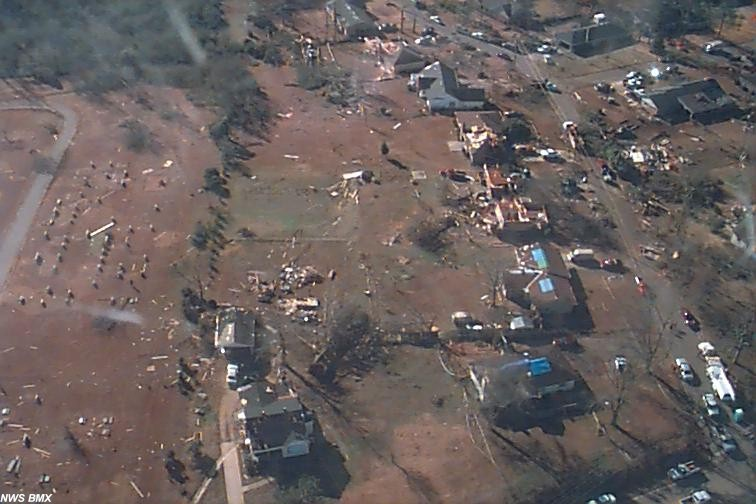
- Damage from the Tuscaloosa tornado.

Meteorological history
- Date: January 24, 1997
- Formed: January 24, 1997, 4:59 p.m. CST (UTC–06:00)
- Dissipated: January 24, 1997, 5:14 p.m. CST (UTC–06:00)
- Duration: 15 minutes

F2 tornado
- on the Fujita scale
- Highest winds: 113–157 mph (182–253 km/h)

Overall effects
- Fatalities: 1
- Injuries: 10
- Damage: $5.005 million

Just a minute before 5:00 PM on January 24, a tornado touched down on the east side of the Warrior River south of Interstate 59 and west of County Road 95. Initial damage included snapped tree branches and shingles torn off of the roof of an apartment complex. As it crossed U.S. Route 82 and Interstate 59, the tornado quickly became stronger, with two businesses, Books-A-Million and Gayfers suffering roof damage. Moving in a northeast direction, the tornado then entered the Woodland Hills area, destroying outbuildings and damaging several homes. A 71-year old retired physician was killed when a tree fell onto the windshield of his pickup truck. It was the first tornado-related fatality in the United States in 1997.

The tornado ultimately reached F2 intensity as it entered Five Points East. The manager of the Food World grocery store at that location saw the approaching tornado and ushered customers into the store. Many cars in the Food World parking lot were destroyed, including one that was tossed into the backyard of a neighboring house while another was tossed through the roof of the store. At least one other business, a Big-B location, also suffered damage.

After impacting the Food World and Big B stores, the tornado continued into the Lynn Haven residential area damaging ten to twelve homes. Damage to these homes ranged from partial to complete roof loss. The tornado then crossed the Tuscaloosa Memorial Gardens Cemetery and State Road 216, entering the Summerfield subdivision. Six to eight houses in the subdivision received minor damage while other structures including a few mobile homes and a small grocery store were destroyed. The tornado dissipated shortly afterwards in a wooded area just north of State Road 216.

A tornado warning was issued for Tuscaloosa County at 5:11 PM, shortly before the tornado dissipated. The warning would remain in effect for another 49 minutes.

The tornado was on the ground for approximately 15 minutes, with a path length of 10 miles long by 200 yards wide. The EMA of Tuscaloosa County concluded that up to 100 structures sustained some degree of damage, ranging from roof damage to complete destruction. The sole fatality that occurred during the tornado was the first tornado-related fatality to occur in 1997, and the first in Tuscaloosa since the 1932 Deep South tornado outbreak killed 37 people in the area.

The December 2000 Tuscaloosa tornado, which occurred almost three years later, would follow a similar path to the 1997 tornado. The 2000 tornado was rated at F4 intensity and killed 11 people.

== See also ==
- December 2000 Tuscaloosa tornado
- 2011 Tuscaloosa–Birmingham tornado
- Tornadoes of 1997
- Tornado intensity and damage
