= Tornadoes of 1952 =

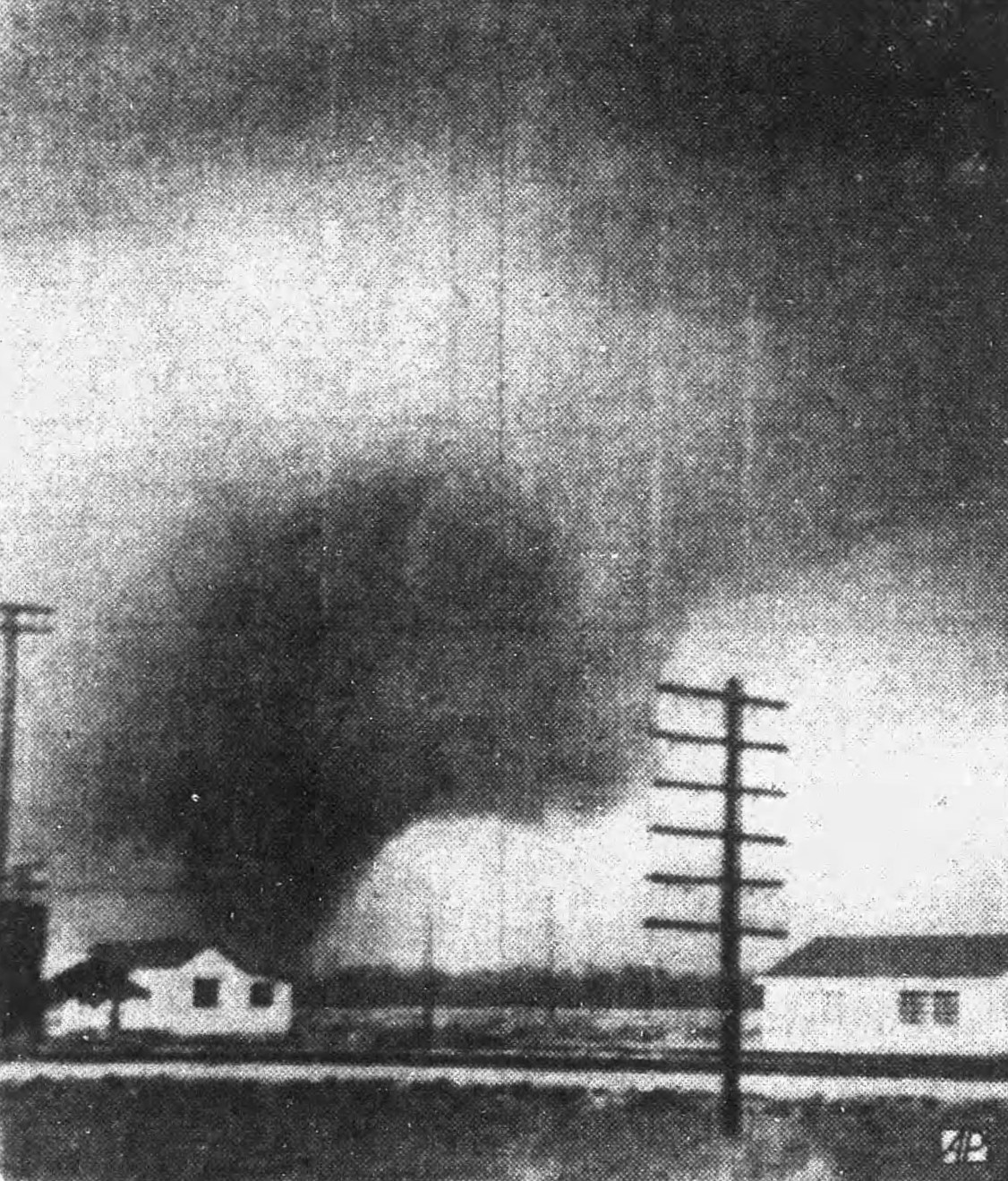
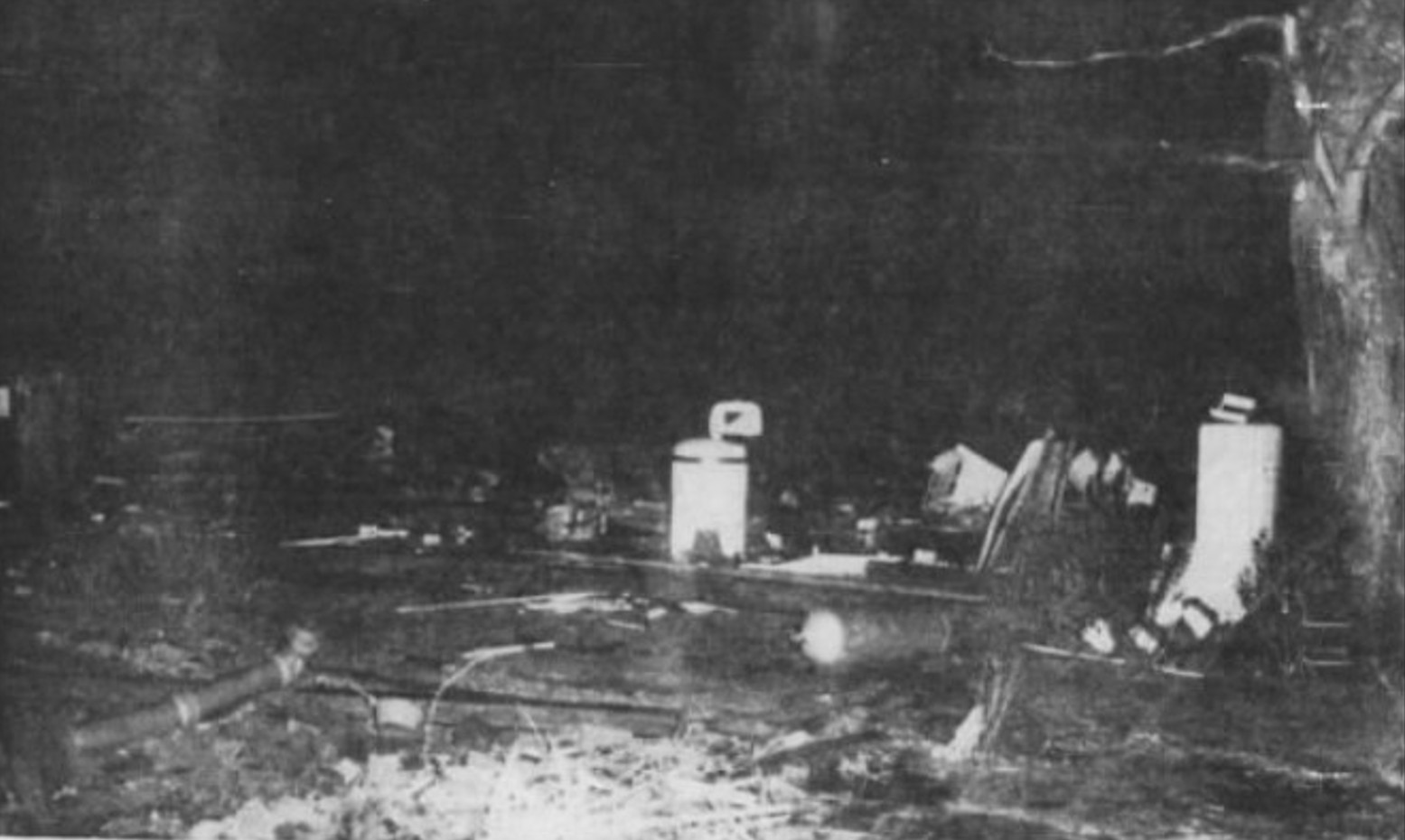
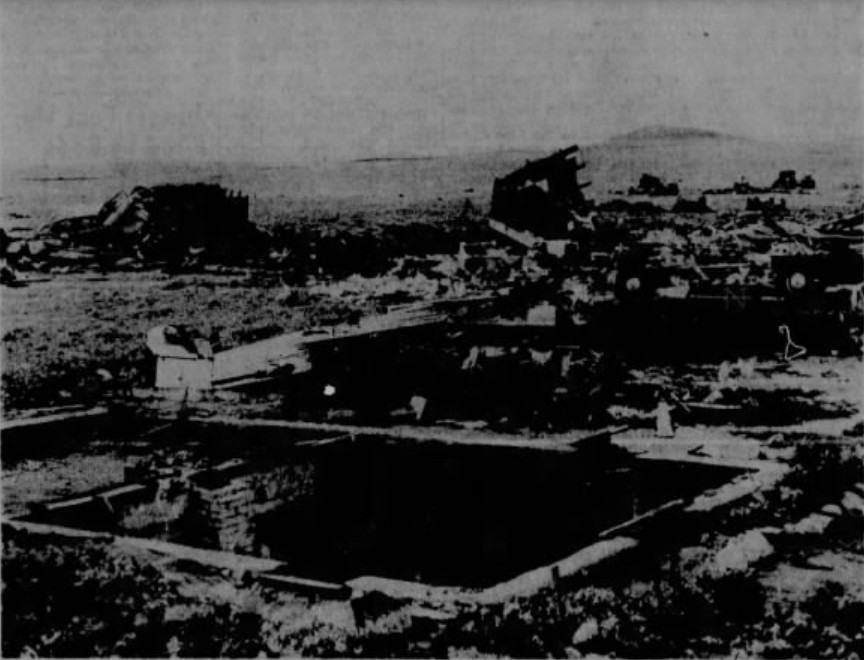
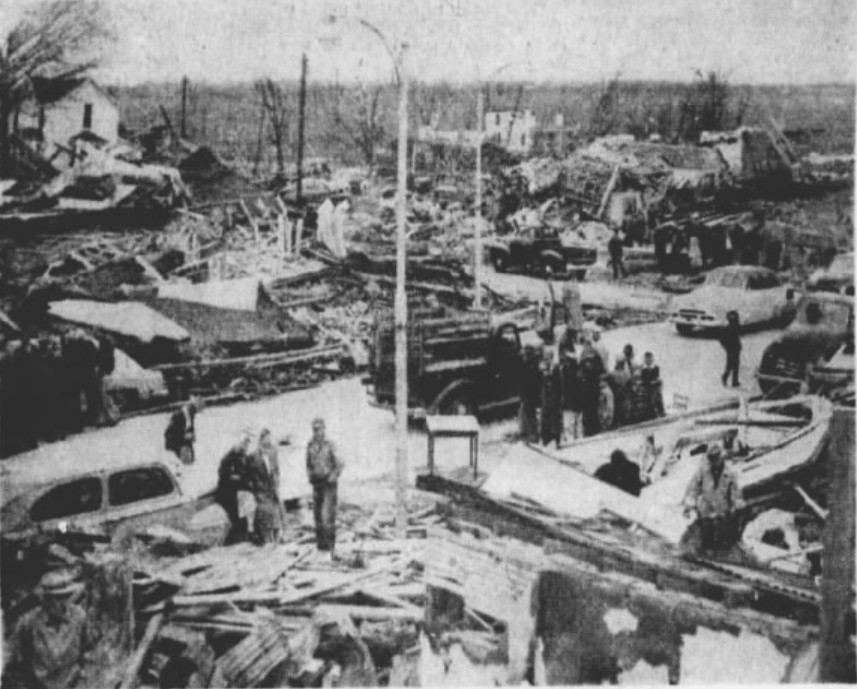
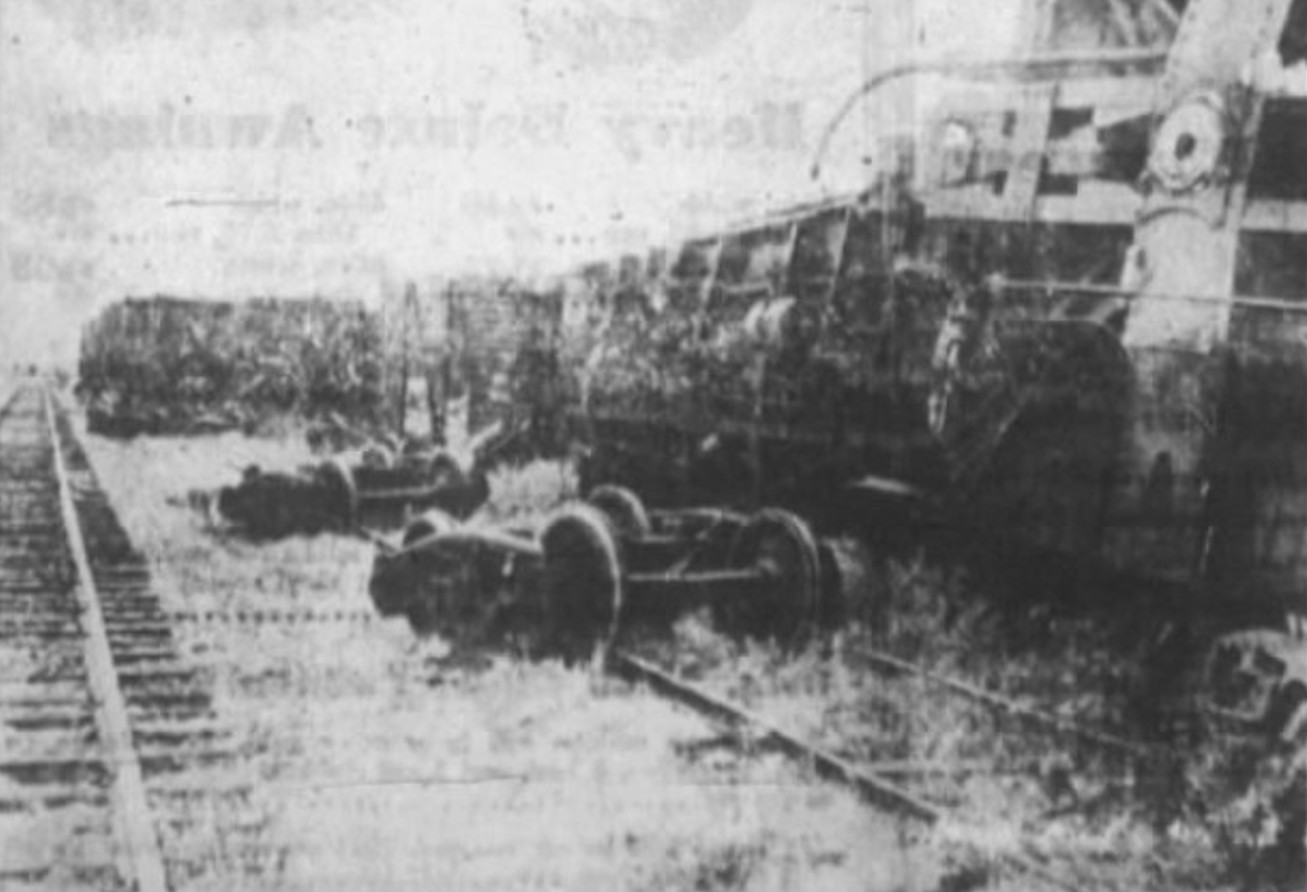
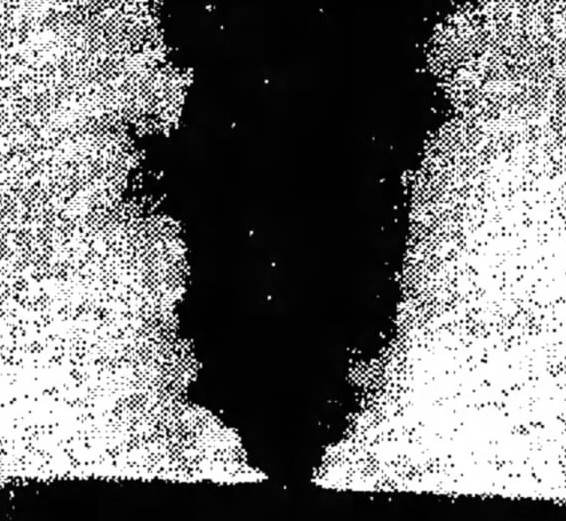
- Clockwise from top: A large F4 tornado near Hazen, Arkansas on March 22; A farmstead near Tuttle, North Dakota after an F4 tornado on July 1; Train box-cars derailed after being struck by an F4 tornado near Ashland, Nebraska on August 13; A tall F0 tornado near Forestburg, South Dakota on June 23; The business district of Judsonia, Arkansas after being struck by an F4 tornado on March 22; A home in Louisville, Kentucky after an F3 tornado on December 9.
- Timespan: January 17–December 20
Maximum rated tornado
F4 tornado
- List
  – Marble Hill-Beech Hill-Dercherd, Tennessee
  on February 13
  – Fayetteville, Tennessee
  on February 29
  – Dierks, Arkansas
  on March 21
  – Judsonia-Bald Knob, Arkansas
  on March 21
  – Lonoke, Arkansas
  on March 21
  – Cotton Plant, Arkansas
  on March 21
  – Hickory Plains-Georgetown-McCrory-Hickory Ridge, Arkansas
  on March 21
  – Tatumville, Tennessee
  on March 21
  – Cooter-Cottonwood Point, Missouri
  on March 21
  – Newbern, Tennessee
  on March 21
  – Byhalia, Mississippi-Moscow, Tennessee
  on March 21
  – Henderson, Tennessee
  on March 21
  – Massey-Plainview, Alabama
  on March 22
  – Crawford-McGregor, Texas
  on April 21
  – Lawrence-Kansas City, Kansas
  on May 22
  – Cherokee County, Iowa
  on June 23
  – Tuttle, North Dakota
  on July 1
  – Ashland, Nebraska
  on August 13
- Tornadoes in U.S.: 240
- Damage (U.S.): $94.302 million (1952 USD)
- Fatalities (U.S.): 233
- Fatalities (worldwide): >233

This page documents the tornadoes and tornado outbreaks of 1952, primarily in the United States. Most tornadoes form in the U.S., although some events may take place internationally. Tornado statistics for older years like this often appear significantly lower than modern years due to fewer reports or confirmed tornadoes.

The total count of tornadoes and ratings differs from various agencies accordingly. The article, therefore, documents information from the most contemporary official sources alongside assessments from tornado historian Thomas P. Grazulis.

== Events ==
Fatal United States tornadoes in 1952
- Approximate touchdown location of killer tornadoes in 1952
Summary of tornadoes
- February 13 – Alabama (1 death)
- February 13 – Alabama (1 death)
- February 13 – Tennessee (3 deaths)
- February 29 – Tennessee (3 deaths)
- February 29 – Tennessee (2 deaths)
- March 16 – California (3 deaths)
- March 21 – Arkansas (7 deaths)
- March 21 – Arkansas (50+ deaths)
- March 21 – Arkansas (40+ deaths)
- March 21 – Arkansas (8 deaths)
- March 21 – Tennessee (1+ deaths)
- March 21 – Arkansas (4 deaths)
- March 21 – Arkansas (1 death)
- March 21 – Arkansas, Missouri, Tennessee (25+ death)
- March 21 – Tennessee (9+ deaths)
- March 21 – Mississippi, Tennessee (17 deaths)
- March 21 – Tennessee (2+ deaths)
- March 21 – Tennessee (38 deaths)
- March 21 – Tennessee (3 deaths)
- March 22 – Alabama (4 deaths)
- April 4 – Louisiana (4 deaths)
- May 10 – South Carolina (2 deaths)
- June 23 – Wisconsin (2 deaths)
- July 1 – North Dakota (1 death)
- July 19 – Montana, North Dakota (1 death)
- August 21 – Missouri (1 death)
Total fatalities: ~233

Although fewer tornadoes were confirmed than the previous year, 1952 had an exceptionally high number of F4 tornadoes. There was 18 tornadoes that had this rating, mostly due to an unusually intense Mid-March outbreak that produced 11 of them along with 11 F3 tornadoes. This outbreak is also what drove the death toll to well over 200 that year. Despite this, no tornadoes were rated F5, leaving the US without an official F5 tornado until the next year.

=== United States yearly total ===
Confirmed tornadoes by Fujita rating
FU	F0	F1	F2	F3	F4	F5	Total
1	32	82	72	36	18	0	241

== January ==
There were 12 tornadoes confirmed in the US in January.

== February ==
There were 27 tornadoes confirmed in the US in February.

=== February 13 ===
FU	F0	F1	F2	F3	F4	F5
0	2	5	3	4	1	0

An intense outbreak of 15 tornadoes struck the Southeast. An F3 tornado moved through Northern New Lexington, Alabama as well as rural areas southwest of Berry, killing one and injuring 14. Another F3 tornado near Adamsville, Alabama killed one and injured 26. The worst event involved a violent F4 tornado in Tennessee that obliterated Beech Hill and heavily damaged Decherd, killing three and injuring 44. Overall, the outbreak killed five and injured 102.

=== February 19–20 ===
FU	F0	F1	F2	F3	F4	F5
0	0	0	2	0	0	0

F2 tornadoes caused injuries and destruction on back-to-back days. The one on February 19 occurred southwest of Shreveport, Louisiana; it destroyed two homes and damaged three others along with three outbuildings, resulting in five injuries. The one that occurred the next day struck Millville, Florida, destroying a home while damaging 12 others along with six other buildings, injuring four others.

=== February 29 ===
FU	F0	F1	F2	F3	F4	F5
0	0	1	5	1	1	0

A second February outbreak of tornadoes in the Southeast struck on Leap Day. Eight tornadoes touched down with seven of them being significant. However, the weakest tornado was actually the deadliest in this outbreak. The F1 tornado moved right through the tiny town of Belfast, Tennessee, killing three and injuring 166, the most injuries ever recorded in an F1/EF1 tornado. (although sources vary on the casualty count as the injuries may have been the F4 tornado listed below) The second worst tornado came next: a violent F4 tornado struck Downtown Fayetteville, Tennessee, killing two and injuring 150. A destructive F3 tornado also caused considerable damage on the north side of Fort Payne, Alabama while injuring 12 people. Overall, the outbreak killed five and injured 336.

== March ==
There were 43 confirmed tornadoes in the US in March.

=== March 16 ===
A tornado struck Santa Monica in Los Angeles County destroying beach buildings, and damaging boats in a boat yard as well as glass damage in town. Three people were killed and one builder was injured.

=== March 21–22 ===
FU	F0	F1	F2	F3	F4	F5
1	2	1	6	11	11	0

An extremely violent and deadly tornado outbreak struck the Mississippi and Ohio Valleys. Tennessee and Arkansas took the brunt of the outbreak, with two of the F4 tornadoes killing 50 and 29 people in Arkansas respectively while another F4 tornado in Tennessee killed 38. 27 of the 31 tornadoes, 202 of the 209 fatalities, and 1,133 of the 1,212 injuries occurred on March 21 alone. In all, the outbreak produced 11 F4 tornadoes, which remains the fourth-highest amount of violent tornadoes in one outbreak as of 2024.

== April ==
There were 37 tornadoes confirmed in the US in April.

=== April 3–5 ===
FU	F0	F1	F2	F3	F4	F5
0	2	7	6	2	0	0

An outbreak of 17 tornadoes hit areas from the Southern Plains to the Northeast. On April 4, a long-track F3 tornado struck Ardoin's Cove, Louisiana, destroying all but two of the 20 houses in the town. It also caused lesser damage in Roanoke and Church Point. There were 10 injuries from this tornado. Later, a fatal F2 tornado caused major damage Bristol, Arnaudville, and Bayou Portage, killing four and injuring 33. The next day, 10 tornadoes touched down in the Mid-Atlantic and the Northeast. The strongest was an F3 tornado, which was embedded within a much larger area of straight line winds, that damaged or destroyed numerous structures in York, Pennsylvania, injuring four. An F2 tornado touched down near Lititz, Pennsylvania causing roof and wall damage to a farm house north of the town. Other homes were damaged, including a 420-foot high tower that was blown down. The tornado carried a man 65 feet. Tons of trees were blown down, other buildings were damaged, and a garage was destroyed. In all, the outbreak killed four people and injured 69.

=== April 20–23 ===
FU	F0	F1	F2	F3	F4	F5
0	6	3	0	0	1	0

A minor outbreak of 10 tornadoes occurred across the Great Plains and the Lower Mississippi Valley. On April 21, an F4 tornado tracked east-southeastward between Crawford and McGregor, Texas, heavily damaging two automobiles, one of which was a pickup truck that was thrown 200 ft (61 m), and destroying several farm buildings, including small homes on four farms. The home on the first farm was swept clean off its foundation. The six occupants of the home ran out of the house and laid flat in the field, escaping the tornado without any injuries. As a result, there were no casualties from this tornado. All the other tornadoes were weak and none of them caused any casualties as well.

== May ==
There were 34 tornadoes confirmed in the US in May.

=== May 10–11 ===
FU	F0	F1	F2	F3	F4	F5
0	0	3	1	2	0	0

A series of six destructive tornadoes struck the Southeast. On May 10, a strong F3 tornado moved through Bertie County, North Carolina, destroying a home and 12 other buildings while damaging seven other building, injuring six people. Another F3 tornado moved through Woodruff, destroying a house and two other structures, killing two and injuring four. (the CDNS report says no casualties occurred with the storm, but rather the wind damage that occurred near or in Spartanburg) The next morning, a devastating F3 tornado moved directly through Alapaha, Georgia, destroying the town's water tank, 32 buildings including school buildings, 20 vehicles, and other structures. More than 1,000 large trees blown down, blocking streets and tearing down utility lines as well. There were 10 injuries. In the end, the outbreak killed two and injured 20.

=== May 21–24 ===
FU	F0	F1	F2	F3	F4	F5
0	3	7	5	0	1	0

An outbreak of 16 tornadoes affected areas from the Great Plains to the Southeast. On May 22, a long-tracked, .25 mi-wide (0.40 km) F4 tornado tore through areas just northeast of Lawrence, Kansas to the western suburbs of Kansas City, Kansas. The towns of Linwood and Edwardsville were particularly hard hit, as dozens of homes were destroyed, including the home of a bank president that was leveled. Tornado researcher Thomas P. Grazulis indicated that the tornado, which injured three people, may have reached F5 intensity as well. Three people were injured and damages were estimated at $250,000. (The CDNS report lists 13 injuries form this tornado) An F2 tornado then struck Lake Lotawana near Lee's Summit southeast of Kansas City, Missouri, injuring another person. Overall, although there were no fatalities, eight people were injured by the tornadoes.

== June ==
There were 34 tornadoes confirmed in the US in June.

=== June 23–24 ===
FU	F0	F1	F2	F3	F4	F5
0	2	0	3	1	1	0

Several intense tornadoes touched down across the Great Plains. On June 23, an F4 tornado passed between Cleghorn and Meriden, Iowa before striking Larrabee, injuring four. Later, an extremely long-tracked F2 tornado traveled 104.8 miles (168.7 km) through mostly rural areas before ending in the southwestern suburbs of Minneapolis, Minnesota, injuring 10. Next, a fatal F3 tornado struck Centuria, Wisconsin, killing two and injuring six. The next day, another long-tracked F2 tornado moved directly through Downtown Minneapolis during its 70.9-mile-path (114.1 km), injuring 15 people. Overall, the outbreak produced seven tornadoes that killed two and injured 35.

== July ==
There were 27 tornadoes confirmed in the US in July.

=== July 1–2 ===
FU	F0	F1	F2	F3	F4	F5
0	0	2	1	1	1	0

Three significant tornadoes struck North Dakota on July 1. The strongest, as well as the only one to cause casualties, was a long-tracked F4 tornado that moved through Arena and Tuttle, with the latter area taking the brunt of the damage. Entire farms were demolished and Tuttle sustained considerable damage. Described as worst storm to hit that area, the tornado destroyed eight homes and more than 175 other buildings while 200 other homes and over 600 other buildings were damaged along its path. A man was killed before he could take refuge in the basement of his home which was carried away, while 26 others were injured. (the CDNS report only lists two injuries) Two additional F1 tornadoes touched down the next day in Minnesota and Iowa as well. In all, six tornadoes touched down.

=== July 19 ===
FU	F0	F1	F2	F3	F4	F5
0	0	0	1	2	0	0

Three strong tornadoes touched down across the northern section of the United States. The first one was an early morning F2 tornado that hit Beaverdam and Corry, Pennsylvania. It struck a church, tearing off its belfry, removing half of its metal roof, and twisting it off its foundation. It also damaged the corner of a factory building after it pulled out six large windows. Later, in the evening, a long-tracked F3 tornado that moved through Baker, Montana, blowing off roofs and throwing debris into vehicles, damaging them in the process. It then moved through rural sections of Slope County, North Dakota before dissipating. The final tornado was a shorter-tracked, but fatal F3 tornado that hit Wibaux, Montana, completely destroying a large farm establishment. It then moved into rural Golden Valley County, North Dakota, where it killed a baby and injured its parents. (another child was injured according to the CDNS report, but this was not officially counted) It also neatly sawed off a windmill about 3 inches (7.6 cm) above its cement block foundation before dissipating. This was the only tornado of the three to cause casualties.

== August ==
There were 16 tornadoes confirmed in the US in August.

=== August 12–16 ===
FU	F0	F1	F2	F3	F4	F5
0	0	3	2	1	1	0

A slowly progressing, but destructive series of seven tornadoes moved across the country. The worst and strongest tornadoes occurred on August 13 in Nebraska. A large F3 tornado passed near Richland and David City, heavily damaging or destroying seven sets of farm buildings. Six hay stacks were also scattered and lost and one person was injured. (the CDNS report does not list an injury) At around the same time, an even stronger F4 tornado moved passed near Wahoo, Memphis, and Ashland, destroying building on 15 farms, including two where all the buildings, along with the homes, were leveled, and injuring 20. The 21 injuries were the only casualties from the period.

=== August 21 ===
An isolated, but strong F2 tornado struck the Missouri State Fair in Sedalia, Missouri. Tents, buildings, trucks, house trailers, amusement installments, and many valuable exhibits were heavily damaged or destroyed. One man was killed in a destroyed house trailer and 13 others were injured.

== September ==
There was one tornado confirmed in the US in September.

=== September 17 ===
An F3 tornado touched down as a waterspout over Roanoke Sound, crossing over Nags Head Beach, North Carolina, before moving into the Atlantic Ocean and dissipating. A fully equipped beach cottage was obliterated while two others were badly damaged and roofs of other buildings and telephone lines were damaged. There were no casualties. It would be the only tornado to touch down during the month of September.

== October ==
There were no tornadoes confirmed in the US in October, the first time that no tornadoes were recorded during a month since official records began in 1950.

== November ==
There were six tornadoes confirmed in the US in November.

== December ==
There were three tornadoes confirmed in the US in December.

=== December 3 ===
An F2 tornado struck Kittrell, Texas as it moved through Walker and Trinity counties. It destroyed 13 homes and 20 other buildings while damaging 10 other homes. Four people were injured.

=== December 9 ===
A large, destructive, long-tracked F3 tornado touched down near West Louisville, Kentucky and moved northeastward. It then tore directly through Ownesboro before moving through rural areas northeast of there. Along this portion of the path, three homes, numerous barns, and smaller structures were destroyed, several buildings were unroofed, trees were uprooted, and communication and power lines were blown down. The storm was also accompanied by hail the size of "guinea eggs." Three people were injured. The tornado then crossed the Ohio River into Indiana and struck Tell City, still accompanied by hail that was at this point being described as baseball size. The tornado leveled many buildings, which were mostly outbuildings, unroofed many residences and business establishments, twisted TV antennas, and caused additional damage elsewhere. Hail also battered cars, broke many windows, and damaged roofs and other structures. The tornado then continued northeast of there a short distance before dissipating.

== See also ==
- Tornado
  - Tornadoes by year
  - Tornado records
  - Tornado climatology
  - Tornado myths
- List of tornado outbreaks
  - List of F5 and EF5 tornadoes
  - List of North American tornadoes and tornado outbreaks
  - List of 21st-century Canadian tornadoes and tornado outbreaks
  - List of European tornadoes and tornado outbreaks
  - List of tornadoes and tornado outbreaks in Asia
  - List of Southern Hemisphere tornadoes and tornado outbreaks
  - List of tornadoes striking downtown areas
  - List of tornadoes with confirmed satellite tornadoes
- Tornado intensity
  - Fujita scale
  - Enhanced Fujita scale
