= Leap Day tornado outbreak =

Leap Day tornado outbreak can refer to:

- Tornado outbreak of Leap Day 1952 - Struck the Southeastern United States, killing 5
- 2012 Leap Day tornado outbreak - Early season tornado outbreak in the Midwestern United States, killing 15
