= Tornado outbreak of February 13, 1952 =

Severe weather event in the United States

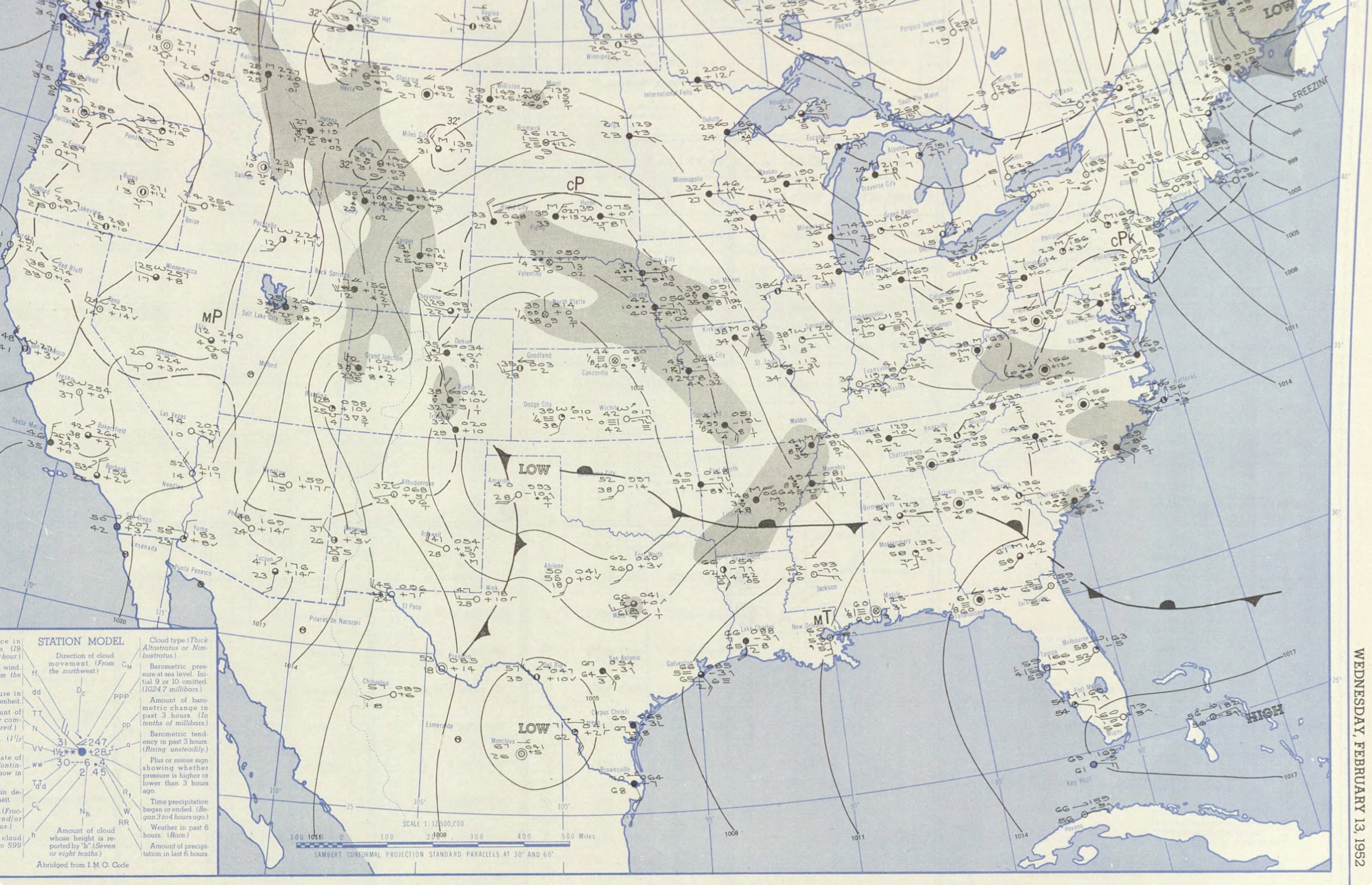
- Weather map on February 13, showing the low pressure system over Texas that produced the tornado outbreak across the Southeast United States

Tornado outbreak
- Tornadoes: 15
- Max. rating: F4 tornado
- Duration: February 13, 1952

Overall effects
- Fatalities: 5
- Injuries: 102
- Damage: $1,167,500 ($14,150,000 in 2025 USD)
- Areas affected: Southeastern United States
- Part of the tornadoes and tornado outbreaks of 1952

Several destructive tornadoes struck the Southeastern United States, primarily along and east of the Lower Mississippi Valley, on February 13, 1952. Multiple intense tornadoes touched down throughout the day, three of which were killers. The deadliest and most destructive tornado of the outbreak was a violent F4 that touched down in south-central Tennessee, killing three people and injuring 44 others. A similarly destructive tornado—albeit of weaker, F2 intensity—formed from the same storm as the preceding F4 and became the second costliest of the outbreak. Another intense tornado affected the Mississippi embayment near Manila, Arkansas, injuring five people, and a pair of deadly F3s in Alabama claimed a combined two lives. In all, the outbreak killed five people and injured 102 others. (Note: An outbreak is generally defined as a group of at least six tornadoes (the number sometimes varies slightly according to local climatology) with no more than a six-hour gap between individual tornadoes. An outbreak sequence, prior to (after) the start of modern records in 1950, is defined as a period of no more than two (one) consecutive days without at least one significant (F2 or stronger) tornado.)

== Meteorological synopsis ==
A fast-moving low-pressure system formed over Northern California on February 11. As it moved quickly eastward another low formed over northeastern New Mexico on February 12. These lows moved in tandem into Oklahoma on February 13 and triggered a severe weather outbreak in the Southeastern United States starting that morning.

== Confirmed tornadoes ==
Confirmed tornadoes by Fujita rating
FU	F0	F1	F2	F3	F4	F5	Total
0	2	3	6	3	1	0	15

Prior to 1990, there is a likely undercount of tornadoes, particularly E/F0–1, with reports of weaker tornadoes becoming more common as population increased. A sharp increase in the annual average E/F0–1 count by approximately 200 tornadoes was noted upon the implementation of NEXRAD Doppler weather radar in 1990–1991. (Note: Historically, the number of tornadoes globally and in the United States was and is likely underrepresented: research by Grazulis on annual tornado activity suggests that, as of 2001, only 53% of yearly U.S. tornadoes were officially recorded. Documentation of tornadoes outside the United States was historically less exhaustive, owing to the lack of monitors in many nations and, in some cases, to internal political controls on public information. Most countries only recorded tornadoes that produced severe damage or loss of life. Significant low biases in U.S. tornado counts likely occurred through the early 1990s, when advanced NEXRAD was first installed and the National Weather Service began comprehensively verifying tornado occurrences.) 1974 marked the first year where significant tornado (E/F2+) counts became homogenous with contemporary values, attributed to the consistent implementation of Fujita scale assessments. (Note: The Fujita scale was devised under the aegis of scientist T. Theodore Fujita in the early 1970s. Prior to the advent of the scale in 1971, tornadoes in the United States were officially unrated. Tornado ratings were retroactively applied to events prior to the formal adoption of the F-scale by the National Weather Service. While the Fujita scale has been superseded by the Enhanced Fujita scale in the U.S. since February 1, 2007, Canada used the old scale until April 1, 2013; nations elsewhere, like the United Kingdom, apply other classifications such as the TORRO scale.) Numerous discrepancies on the details of tornadoes in this outbreak exist between sources. The total count of tornadoes and ratings differs from various agencies accordingly. The list below documents information from the most contemporary official sources alongside assessments from tornado historian Thomas P. Grazulis.

Color/symbol key
Color / symbol	Description
†	Data from Grazulis 1990/1993/2001b
¶	Data from a local National Weather Service office
※	Data from the 1952 Climatological Data National Summary publication
‡	Data from the NCEI database
♯	Maximum width of tornado
±	Tornado was rated below F2 intensity by Grazulis but a specific rating is unavailable.

List of confirmed tornadoes in the tornado outbreak of February 13, 1952
F#	Location	County / Parish	State	Start Coord. (Note: All starting coordinates are based on the NCEI database and may not reflect contemporary analyses)	Time (UTC) (Note: All dates are based on the local time zone where the tornado touched down; however, all times are in Coordinated Universal Time and dates are split at midnight CST/CDT for consistency.)	Path length	Width (Note: The listed width values are primarily the average/mean width of the tornadoes, with those having known maximum widths denoted by ♯. From 1952 to 1994, reports largely list mean width whereas contemporary years list maximum width. Values provided by Grazulis are the average width, with estimates being rounded down (i.e. 0.5 mi (0.80 km) is rounded down from 880 yards to 800 yards.)	Damage
F0	Northern Rodessa	Caddo	Louisiana	32.98°N 94.00°W	10:00–?	1 mi (1.6 km)‡	133 yd (122 m)‡	$25,000
F0	This tornado may have started in McLeod, Texas. A barn was shifted off its foundation, a garage lost a wall, and a trio of oil rigs were toppled. Lightning from the storm also burned down a home.							
F3†	N of Buckeye†	Mississippi	Arkansas	35.95°N 90.15°W	22:53–?†	0.3 mi (0.48 km)‡	33 yd (30 m)‡	Unknown
F3†	This short-lived, intense tornado obliterated a five-room home, debris of which was found 3 mi (4.8 km) away. The tornado also unroofed a home nearby and wrecked many outbuildings. All five injuries, two of which were serious, came from one family, but no damage estimate was given. The funnel cloud from this storm was seen in Manila and passed east-northeast of Leachville.							
F2	S of Camden	Benton	Tennessee	36.00°N 88.12°W	23:00–?†	1 mi (1.6 km)†	300 yd (270 m)	$20,000†
F2	This small-but-strong tornado damaged or destroyed nine homes and half a dozen other structures, affecting a total of nine families.							
F2	NW of Holland to Denton to E of Braggadocio	Pemiscot	Missouri	36.07°N 89.93°W	23:10–?	6 mi (9.7 km)†	100 yd (91 m)	$3,000※
F2	This tornado wrecked a few spacious barns and a small home while damaging several other barns and houses west of Steele. The funnel reportedly touched down a few times, producing intermittent damage. Large, 1-inch-diameter (2.5 cm) hail accompanying the storm caused additional damage.							
F0	NNE of House※	Neshoba	Mississippi	32.77°N 89.10°W	01:30–?	0.1 mi (0.16 km)‡	33 yd (30 m)‡	$15,000※
F0	A brief tornado formed southeast of Philadelphia, mangling a windmill. Windows and vehicles nearby were smashed or otherwise damaged by hail. Lightning damaged radio towers as well. Oats and gardens were also damaged.							
F2†	Between Linton and Newsom	Davidson	Tennessee	36.05°N 87.03°W	01:45–?	1 mi (1.6 km)†	200 yd (180 m)	$15,000※
F2†	A "'baby twister'" traversing a narrow valley struck the Poplar Farm, severely damaging a corn crib, a pair of farmhouses, and a shed laden with agricultural implements.							
F3	New Lexington to S of Berry†	Fayette, Tuscaloosa	Alabama	33.57°N 87.67°W	02:30–?†	5 mi (8.0 km)†	100 yd (91 m)	$17,500※
F3	1 death – A destructive tornado moved northeastward, paralleling the Fayette–Tuscaloosa County line. In Tuscaloosa County, nine homes were destroyed or damaged, and a dozen additional were likewise affected in Fayette County. The sole fatality was due to a collapsed chimney. 14 injuries were reported.							
F2†	NE of Garden City to N of Chamblees Mill‡	Cullman, Blount	Alabama	34.02°N 86.75°W	02:30–?	≥ 7 mi (11 km)†	100 yd (91 m)	$40,000※
F2†	A tornado touched down near Garden City and moved northeastward. At least 62 homes were damaged or destroyed, and six injuries were confirmed. The tornado may have tracked all the way to Snead.							
F1	NE of Speiden	Giles※, Lincoln	Tennessee	35.23°N 86.82°W	03:00–?	0.2 mi (0.32 km)‡	400 yd (370 m)‡	Unknown
F1	This, the first member of a 30-mile-long (48 km) tornado family, successively passed through or near the small, rural communities of McBurg, Swan Creek, and Boonshill. A house in Giles County was negligibly damaged.							
F3	Shady Grove to Adamsville to Graysville to Pinson¶	Jefferson	Alabama	33.60°N 86.93°W	03:30–?	15 mi (24 km)†	200 yd (180 m)	$65,000†
F3	1 death – An intense tornado moved through the northern suburbs of Birmingham, dispersing debris for several hundred yards. In all 131 homes and other structures were destroyed or damaged. 26 injuries were recorded.							
F2†	Howell to Mulberry※	Lincoln	Tennessee	35.22°N 86.60°W	04:00–?	7.4 mi (11.9 km)‡	350 yd (320 m)‡	$300,000†
F2†	This, the second member of the Speiden tornado family, destroyed or damaged 136 homes and various other structures. A few people were injured and 45 families affected.							
F1	N of Athens	Monroe	Mississippi	33.85°N 88.47°W	04:00–?	0.1 mi (0.16 km)‡	33 yd (30 m)‡	$20,000※
F1	A tornado was confirmed, but without details. One person was injured.							
F4	Lois to Decherd†	Moore, Franklin	Tennessee	35.20°N 86.30°W	04:30–?	12 mi (19 km)†	100 yd (91 m)‡	$435,000†
F4	3 deaths – See section on this tornado – 44 people were injured.							
F1	WNW of Kiln	Hancock	Mississippi	30.42°N 89.48°W	04:30–?	12.7 mi (20.4 km)‡	100 yd (91 m)‡	$12,000※
F1	A tornado was confirmed, but no other data were provided. A few people were injured.							
F2†	Monteagle to Tracy City	Grundy	Tennessee	35.27°N 85.75°W	04:30†–04:45※	6 mi (9.7 km)†	400 yd (370 m)	$200,000※
F2†	This was the final member of the Speiden–Decherd tornado family. About 150 homes and other buildings were damaged along the path, and widespread, F2-level damage was reported. Two people were injured.							

=== Lois–Marble Hill–Beech Hill–Marble Plains–Decherd, Tennessee ===
Lois–Marble Hill–Beech Hill–Marble Plains–Decherd, Tennessee
Meteorological history
- Formed: February 13, 1952, 10:30 p.m. CST (UTC−06:00)

F4 tornado
- on the Fujita scale

Overall effects
- Fatalities: 3
- Injuries: 44
- Damage: $435,000 ($5,270,000 in 2025 USD)

This violent tornado developed from the same supercell that produced two prior tornadoes in Giles and Lincoln counties. It touched down just west of the Moore–Franklin county line near Lois and moved eastward. It first struck areas along SR 50 in Marble Hill causing catastrophic damage. It destroyed 23 homes and outbuildings and damaged 27 others, affecting 20 families. Hundreds of trees were also prostrated in Moore County, principally between Marble Hill and Lois. The tornado then moved into Franklin County and obliterated parts of Beech Hill where a church, school, store, and dwelling were all destroyed. After moving over rural, low-lying farmland, the tornado demolished portions of Marble Plains. One home in this area was swept away, killing the two occupants. The tornado then moved into Roark Creek, where several homes and two barns were leveled. After passing through another rural, forested area, the tornado roared into the north side of Decherd, where more heavy destruction and another fatality occurred. There were 15 homes destroyed and 50 others damaged while 85 other buildings were damaged or destroyed. Five freight cars on the Nashville, Chattanooga and St. Louis Railway were derailed and scattered along the right of way in the town as well. The tornado dissipated shortly afterwards. In all, 109 farms along the entire path reported damage, and more than 100 houses were destroyed or damaged in Franklin County. However, only a single homesite incurred F4 damage, just west of Decherd.

== Non-tornadic impacts ==
Most of the damage during this event was either by tornadoes or the storm that produced it. However, one isolated report of large hail was recorded in Warren, Mississippi. Windows were broken, automobiles were dented, and gardens and winter grains were damaged.

== See also ==
- List of North American tornadoes and tornado outbreaks
  - List of F4 and EF4 tornadoes

== Sources ==
- Agee, Ernest M.; Childs, Samuel (June 1, 2014). "Adjustments in Tornado Counts, F-Scale Intensity, and Path Width for Assessing Significant Tornado Destruction". Journal of Applied Meteorology and Climatology. 53 (6). American Meteorological Society: 1494–1505. doi:10.1175/JAMC-D-13-0235.1.
- Brooks, Harold E. (April 2004). "On the Relationship of Tornado Path Length and Width to Intensity". Weather and Forecasting. 19 (2): 310–19. Bibcode:2004WtFor..19..310B. doi:10.1175/1520-0434(2004)019<0310:OTROTP>2.0.CO;2.
- Cook, A. R.; Schaefer, J. T. (August 2008). "The Relation of El Niño–Southern Oscillation (ENSO) to Winter Tornado Outbreaks". Monthly Weather Review. 136 (8): 3121–3137. Bibcode:2008MWRv..136.3121C. doi:10.1175/2007MWR2171.1.
- Edwards, Roger; LaDue, James G.; Ferree, John T.; Scharfenberg, Kevin; Maier, Chris; Coulbourne, William L. (May 1, 2013). "Tornado Intensity Estimation: Past, Present, and Future". Bulletin of the American Meteorological Society. 94 (5). American Meteorological Society: 641–653. doi:10.1175/BAMS-D-11-00006.1.
- Grazulis, Thomas P. (May 1984). Violent Tornado Climatography, 1880–1982. OSTI (Technical report). NUREG. Washington, D.C.: Nuclear Regulatory Commission. OSTI 7099491. CR-3670.
  - — (November 1990). Significant Tornadoes 1880–1989. Vol. 2. St. Johnsbury, Vermont: The Tornado Project of Environmental Films. ISBN 1-879362-02-3.
  - — (July 1993). Significant Tornadoes 1680–1991: A Chronology and Analysis of Events. St. Johnsbury, Vermont: The Tornado Project of Environmental Films. ISBN 1-879362-03-1.
  - — (2001a). The Tornado: Nature's Ultimate Windstorm. Norman: University of Oklahoma Press. ISBN 978-0-8061-3538-0.
  - — (2001b). F5-F6 Tornadoes. St. Johnsbury, Vermont: The Tornado Project of Environmental Films.
- National Weather Service (February 1952). Storm Data Publication (Report). National Centers for Environmental Information – via Storm Events Database.
- U.S. Weather Bureau (February 1952). "Storm data and unusual weather phenomena". Climatological Data National Summary. 3 (2). Asheville, North Carolina: National Climatic Data Center: 39–40.
