= Tornado outbreak of April 29 – May 1, 1909 =

Tornado outbreak in the United States

Tornado outbreak of April 29–May 1, 1909
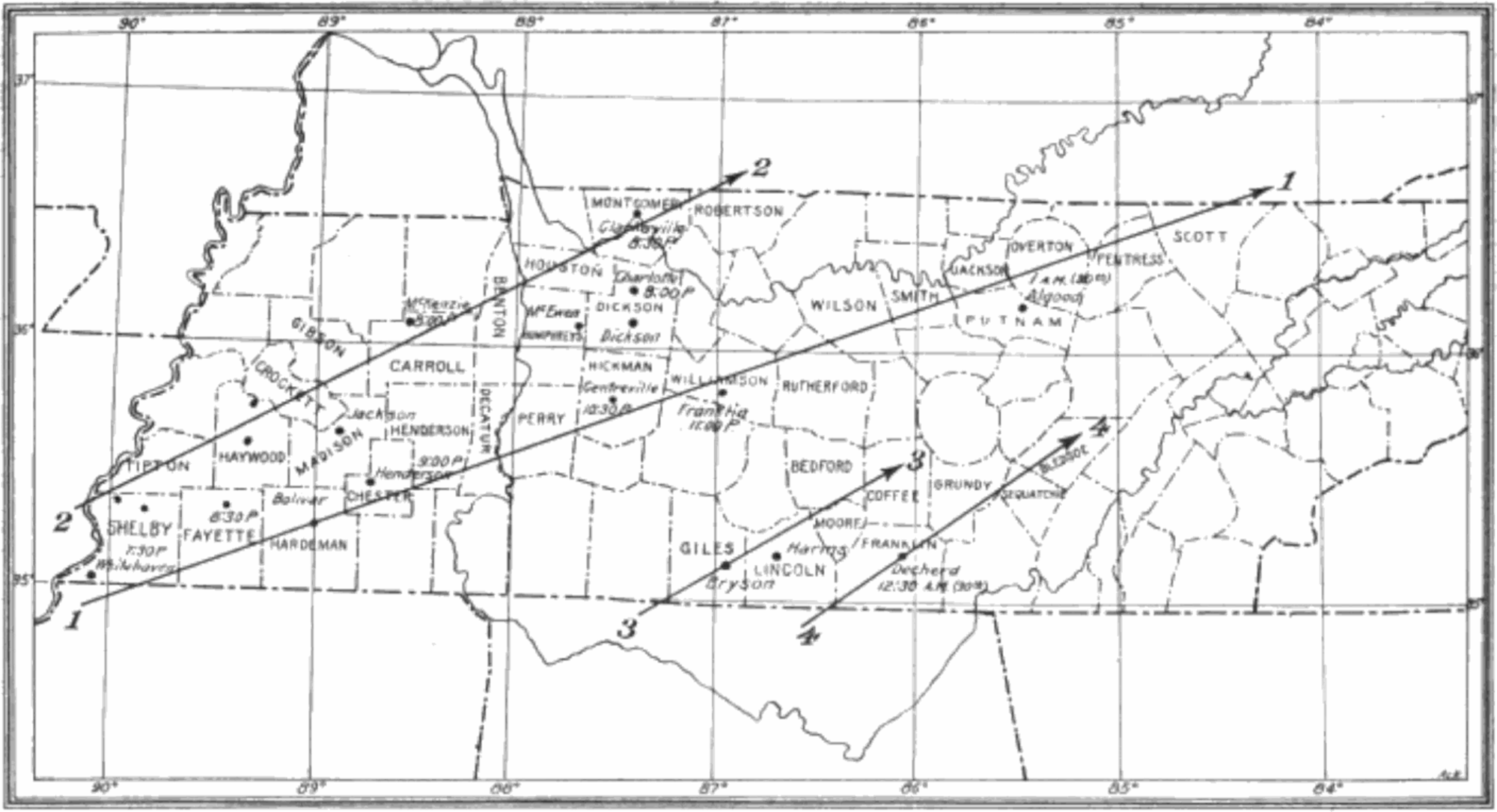
- The paths taken by tornadoes across Tennessee on April 29

Meteorological history
- Date: April 29–May 1, 1909

Tornado outbreak
- Tornadoes: ≥43
- Max. rating: F4 tornado
- Duration: 1 day, 21 hours, 55 minutes

Overall effects
- Fatalities: ≥181 fatalities, ≥770 injuries
- Areas affected: Midwestern and Southern United States

A deadly tornado outbreak affected much of the central and Southern United States from April 29 – May 1, 1909. Affecting particularly the Mississippi and Tennessee Valleys, it killed over 180 people, more than 90 of them in the U.S. state of Tennessee alone. The deadliest and longest-tracked tornado of the outbreak was a violent F4 tornado family that tracked across portions of northern Mississippi and western Tennessee on April 29, claiming at least 29 lives. Another deadly F4 tornado struck portions of southern Tennessee early the next day, killing 31. Other F4s in southern Missouri and southern Illinois on April 29 killed a combined 16 people. Deadly F3s in Georgia and Tennessee from April 30–May 1 killed a total of at least 53 people as well. (Note: An outbreak is generally defined as a group of at least six tornadoes (the number sometimes varies slightly according to local climatology) with no more than a six-hour gap between individual tornadoes. An outbreak sequence, prior to (after) the start of modern records in 1950, is defined as a period of no more than two (one) consecutive days without at least one significant (F2 or stronger) tornado.) (Note: The Fujita scale was devised under the aegis of scientist T. Theodore Fujita in the early 1970s. Prior to the advent of the scale in 1971, tornadoes in the United States were officially unrated. While the Fujita scale has been superseded by the Enhanced Fujita scale in the U.S. since February 1, 2007, Canada used the old scale until April 1, 2013; nations elsewhere, like the United Kingdom, apply other classifications such as the TORRO scale.) (Note: Historically, the number of tornadoes globally and in the United States was and is likely underrepresented: research by Grazulis on annual tornado activity suggests that, as of 2001, only 53% of yearly U.S. tornadoes were officially recorded. Documentation of tornadoes outside the United States was historically less exhaustive, owing to the lack of monitors in many nations and, in some cases, to internal political controls on public information. Most countries only recorded tornadoes that produced severe damage or loss of life. Significant low biases in U.S. tornado counts likely occurred through the early 1990s, when advanced NEXRAD was first installed and the National Weather Service began comprehensively verifying tornado occurrences.)

== Background and impact ==
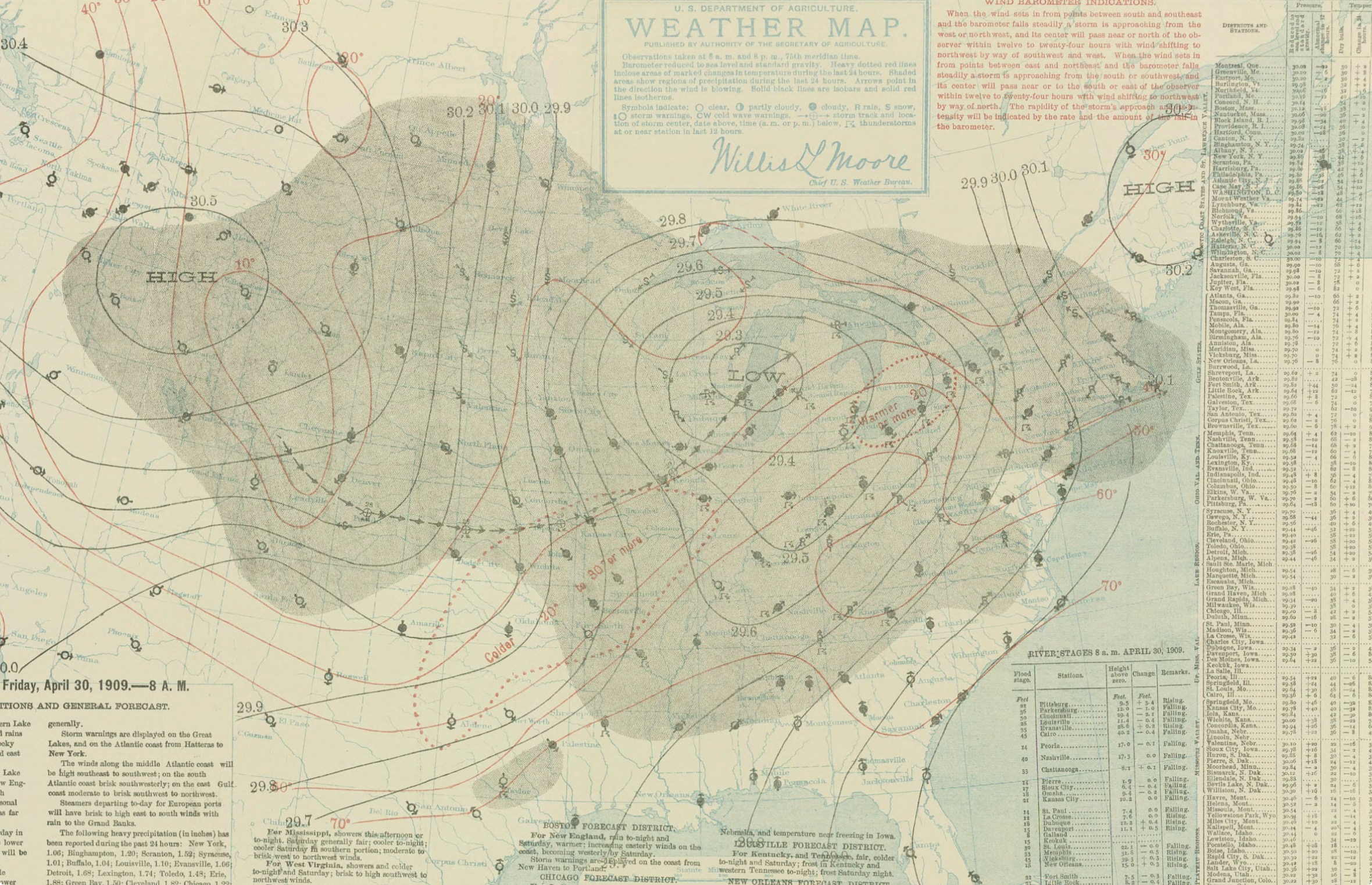
Map on April 30, 1909, showing the low pressure system that produced the tornado outbreak

During the late afternoon and the overnight hours of April 29, 1909, numerous strong to violent tornadoes affected the areas of northern Alabama, eastern Arkansas, southern Illinois, northern Mississippi, southeastern Missouri, and western Tennessee (the NWS Memphis, Tennessee, coverage area). In that general area, at least 72 were killed by tornadoes.

The deadliest tornado touched down just south of the Tennessee-Mississippi state line in Desoto County and tracked east-northeast for about 145 miles (233 km) across Shelby, Fayette, Hardeman, Chester, Henderson and Decatur Counties. While it was estimated to be an F4, some reports indicate that there was more than one tornado. Among the towns affected were Horn Lake, Mississippi, where about half of the fatalities were recorded, and Whitehaven, Tennessee, where the tornado damaged 30 homes. The parent supercell continued on to produce additional tornadoes in Scott County.

North of Memphis, Tennessee, two F3 tornadoes killed a total of 22 from Crittenden County, Arkansas, to Carroll County, Tennessee. Homes were destroyed in Marion, Arkansas, resulting in five deaths in Arkansas. In Tennessee, the town of Locke was mostly destroyed by the first F3 tornado. The second F3 tornado flattened structures near Covington and Medina. Several of the injured people who later died were plantation workers. A family of tornadoes also affected Hickman and Williamson Counties southwest of Nashville and later moved into the city of Cookeville and Putnam County. Three other tornadoes killed four people in the Memphis coverage area, including in St. Francis and Lee Counties in Arkansas and Haywood County in Tennessee.

Other F4 tornadoes were reported in Missouri near Golden, in Illinois near Texas City, and in south-central Tennessee near Bee Spring, just north of the Alabama state line. 11 deaths were recorded in the Missouri storm, five near Texas City and 31 just north of the Alabama–Tennessee state line. The Bee Spring tornado affected parts of Lincoln and Giles Counties in Tennessee. Hardest-hit areas were in and around Pulaski, Bryson and Fayetteville. Another strong tornado struck Franklin County near Decherd.

== Confirmed tornadoes ==
Confirmed tornadoes by Fujita rating
FU	F0	F1	F2	F3	F4	F5	Total
?	?	1	30	8	4	0	≥ 43

- A tornado may have unroofed barns and homes at Monterey, Putnam County, Tennessee.

=== April 29 event ===
Confirmed tornadoes – Thursday, April 29, 1909 (Note: All dates are based on the local time zone where the tornado touched down; however, all times are in Coordinated Universal Time and dates are split at midnight CST/CDT for consistency.) (Note: Prior to 1994, only the average widths of tornado paths were officially listed.)
F#	Location	County / Parish	State	Time (UTC)	Path length	Max. width	Summary
F2	Northern Caddo Gap	Montgomery	Arkansas	19:00–?	Unknown	Unknown	4 deaths — A strong tornado destroyed 10 homes. Four large trees fell onto a home, killing a family of four. 25 injuries were reported.
F2	Shibley to S of Alma	Crawford	Arkansas	22:40–?	4 mi (6.4 km)	Unknown	1 death — 12 or more homes were severely damaged or destroyed. Nine people were injured. The tornado passed near Kibler.
F2	NW of Brinkley to N of Palestine	Monroe, St. Francis	Arkansas	23:00–?	20 mi (32 km)	200 yd (180 m)	1 death — 30 injuries were reported along the path, 21 of which were distributed among 14 homes.
F2	Charleston to Hector	Franklin, Logan, Johnson, Pope	Arkansas	23:00–?	60 mi (97 km)	Unknown	A probable tornado family skipped along, wrecking barns at more than 12 sites. 14 people were injured: eight near Piney and half a dozen near Prairie View.
F4	SW of Golden to S of Viola	Barry, Stone	Missouri	23:00–?	15 mi (24 km)	200 yd (180 m)	11 deaths — Numerous small homes were leveled, some of which were obliterated. 18 people were injured.
F2	Moreland	Pope	Arkansas	23:30–?	Unknown	Unknown	This strong tornado formed from the same storm as the Charleston tornado family and wrecked six homes. Four people were injured.
F2	N of Round Pond	St. Francis	Arkansas	00:00–?	Unknown	Unknown	This tornado wrecked several small homes. Losses totaled at least $11,000. Tornado-related damage may have continued as far as Crawfordsville, which reported an additional loss of $5,000.
F2	E of Formosa to Bee Branch	Van Buren	Arkansas	00:15–?	5 mi (8.0 km)	200 yd (180 m)	1+ death — This strong tornado destroyed Bee Branch, causing numerous fires in its wake. Four other deaths may have occurred but went unreported. 18 people were injured and losses exceeded $50,000.
F2	WNW of Marianna	Lee	Arkansas	00:15–?	10 mi (16 km)	Unknown	1 death — This tornado destroyed or damaged roughly 40 tenant homes, along with six farms. 25 people were injured.
F3	N of Marion (AR) to E of Quito (TN)	Crittenden (AR), Shelby (TN), Tipton (TN)	Arkansas, Tennessee	00:30–?	20 mi (32 km)	100 yd (91 m)	8+ deaths — This intense tornado destroyed 12 or more small homes in Arkansas and later destroyed Locke, Tennessee. 40 people were injured along the path. Five additional deaths may have occurred.
F3	SE of Covington to Medina	Tipton, Haywood, Crockett, Madison, Gibson, Carroll	Tennessee	00:45–?	60 mi (97 km)	200 yd (180 m)	14+ deaths — This intense tornado family probably formed from the same storm as the Brinkley, Marianna, and Marion tornadoes. Small homes and barns were destroyed. The most significant damage began near Bells and ended past Medina. 50 people were injured, many severely; some of these may have died later.
F4	N of Eldorado to Texas City	Saline, Gallatin	Illinois	01:00–?	8 mi (13 km)	200 yd (180 m)	5 deaths — This violent tornado leveled a farmhouse, leaving bodies 1/4 mi (0.40 km) from the homesite. All the deaths were in a single family. Six people were injured.
F3	W of Yukon	Texas	Missouri	01:10–?	15 mi (24 km)	200 yd (180 m)	2 deaths — This intense tornado destroyed much timberland, along with four homes. Five people were injured.
F4	SSW of Horn Lake (MS) to NE of Linden (TN)	DeSoto (MS), Shelby (TN), Fayette (TN), Hardeman (TN), Chester (TN), Henderson (TN), Decatur (TN), Perry (TN)	Mississippi, Tennessee	01:30–?	145 mi (233 km)	600 yd (550 m)	29+ deaths — See section on this tornado
F2	W of Dickson to White Oak Flat	Dickson	Tennessee	02:00–?	20 mi (32 km)	300 yd (270 m)	This strong tornado struck Charlotte, destroying or damaging 25 structures there. Elsewhere eight or nine farmsteads were wrecked. Five people were injured along the path. The tornado may have ended near Bellsburg.
F3	SE of Clarksville (TN) to N of Sango (TN) to NNW of Keysburg (KY)	Montgomery (TN), Robertson (TN), Logan (KY)	Tennessee, Kentucky	02:00–?	20 mi (32 km)	400 yd (370 m)	4 deaths — This intense tornado wrecked homes on three farmsteads. A school was found intact 2 mi (3.2 km) from its original location, having left intermittent gashes in the earth, each at 200-to-300-yard (600 to 900 ft) intervals. 50 people were injured and losses totaled $25,000.
F3	E of Alton	Oregon	Missouri	02:00–?	8 mi (13 km)	200 yd (180 m)	6+ deaths — This intense tornado destroyed five homes, injuring 14 people. As many as eight deaths may have occurred.
F2	W of Heber Springs to N of Floral	Cleburne, Independence	Arkansas	02:30–?	25 mi (40 km)	Unknown	4 deaths — Most of the casualties occurred just northwest of Heber Springs. 25 people were injured.
F3	W of Shipp Bend to N of Clovercroft	Hickman, Maury, Williamson	Tennessee	04:15–?	45 mi (72 km)	300 yd (270 m)	17+ deaths — This deadly, long-tracked, intense tornado tracked through or near Shipp Bend, Centerville, Littlelot, and Leiper's Fork; its path continued just south of Franklin. Losses at Centerville alone reached $100,000, with approximately 75 homes destroyed or damaged. Four deaths occurred in a home at Leiper's Fork, and additional deaths may have occurred nearby. Damage in and near Leiper's Fork may have reached F4 intensity. 43 injuries occurred along the path. The Nolensville F2 formed in the same storm as this.
F2	Near Bold Spring	Humphreys	Tennessee	04:30–?	Unknown	Unknown	At least one home was destroyed. A few injuries were reported, one of them possibly fatal.
F2	Sidney	Shelby	Ohio	04:45–?	Unknown	70 yd (64 m)	An apparently strong tornado caused $60,000 in damage.
F2	S of Bakersfield (MO)	Baxter	Arkansas	Unknown	Unknown	Unknown	At least a few homes were destroyed.
F2	E of Hot Springs	Garland	Arkansas	Unknown	Unknown	Unknown	This tornado destroyed a small home, injuring four family members, and unroofed and destroyed others. A 1,300-pound (21,000 oz) tank was found 1/4 mile (1,300 ft) distant.
F2	Near Brownsville	Haywood	Tennessee	Unknown	Unknown	Unknown	2 deaths — Approximately 20 homes were destroyed or damaged at Hanley. 10 injuries were reported.

=== April 30 event ===
Confirmed tornadoes – Friday, April 30, 1909
F#	Location	County / Parish	State	Time (UTC)	Path length	Max. width	Summary
F4	SW of Aspen Hill to Bee Spring to S of Mulberry	Giles, Lincoln	Tennessee	05:00–?	35 mi (56 km)	1,760 yd (1,610 m)	31+ deaths — This extremely large and violent tornado, Middle Tennessee's third deadliest on record, annihilated many homes at Bee Spring and Millville, some of which were large and well constructed, before wrecking Harms. The communities of Cyruston and Clardyville were affected as well. 70 injuries occurred along the path. A few additional deaths may have been unrecorded. Grazulis indicated that the tornado formed over Limestone County in northernmost Alabama, but reanalysis by the National Weather Service in 2017 only located damage in Tennessee.
F2	ESE of Franklin to S of Nolensville to SW of Statesville (1st tornado)	Williamson, Rutherford, Wilson	Tennessee	05:15–?	35 mi (56 km)	800 yd (730 m)	2 deaths — This large, strong tornado passed near Smyrna and Walterhill, destroying 10 homes before ending as a downburst at Statesville, with numerous trees blown down and much cattle killed at the latter place. Barns, a few churches, a mill, and utility poles were wrecked along the path as well, and large tracts of forest were leveled. 20 people were injured along the path. Other possible but unconfirmed tornadoes occurred along a 100-mile-long (160 km) track through six counties northeast of this.
F2	SW of Statesville (2nd tornado) to E of Alexandria	Wilson, DeKalb	Tennessee	06:00–?	15 mi (24 km)	Unknown	Most of Statesville was badly damaged. Three churches and a schoolhouse were destroyed. Several barns and businesses lost their roofs as well. Two people were injured. The tornado may have been F3 or stronger.
F2	WNW of Broadview to Decherd to ENE of Piedmont	Franklin, Grundy	Tennessee	06:15–?	22 mi (35 km)	1,760 yd (1,610 m)	6+ deaths – This tornado, which likely formed in the same storm as the Bee Spring F4, wrecked 23 homes. A depot and a hotel lost their roofs as well. 30 people were injured and losses totaled $150,000. Additional fatalities may have taken place. The tornado may have been F3 or stronger.
F2	Northwestern Cookeville to Algood	Putnam	Tennessee	07:00–?	6 mi (9.7 km)	Unknown	Several homes were blown off their foundations, a church was wrecked, and a number of barns were flipped or destroyed. A two-story residence was flattened as well. Trees were splintered and lofted for considerable distances. Two people were injured. The tornado may have been F3 or stronger.
F1	Wilder	Fentress	Tennessee	07:30–?	Unknown	100 yd (91 m)	A spacious, two-story building was wrecked, and a home or two were moved off their foundations. Timber was destroyed as well, some of which fell onto and damaged houses. Two people were injured.
F2	NE of Tinch to N of New River	Fentress, Morgan, Scott	Tennessee	08:00–?	20 mi (32 km)	800 yd (730 m)	1 death – A few homes, a sawmill, and much timberland were destroyed. Four people were injured.
F3	SW of Felton to Stilesboro	Haralson, Polk, Paulding, Bartow	Georgia	10:30–?	30 mi (48 km)	150 yd (140 m)	13+ deaths — Seven fatalities occurred in Felton and five more near Rockmart. A final death took place near Cartersville. In all, 40 people were injured. Four additional deaths may have occurred elsewhere.
F2	Victory to Clem	Carroll	Georgia	11:30–?	7 mi (11 km)	Unknown	2 deaths — A number of homes were destroyed. 10 people were injured.
F2	SW of Moulton to N of Danville	Lawrence, Morgan	Alabama	18:00–?	18 mi (29 km)	200 yd (180 m)	4 deaths — This strong tornado wrecked seven homes and killed approximately 100 livestock. 18 people were injured and losses totaled at least $15,000.
F2	Red Bank	Hamilton	Tennessee	19:00–?	Unknown	Unknown	Six homes were unroofed and destroyed. Eight people were injured.
F2	Quillians to Concord	Hall	Georgia	22:30–?	5 mi (8.0 km)	500 yd (460 m)	1 death — At least 12 homes were destroyed. 20 people were injured, one of whom was carried 1/2 mi (0.80 km).
F2	Piedmont	Calhoun	Alabama	22:45–?	Unknown	100 yd (91 m)	A tornado destroyed a church and three homes.
F2	W of Pyriton	Clay	Alabama	02:00–?	15 mi (24 km)	Unknown	A tornado destroyed three homes near Delta, injuring six people.
F2	Cunningham Landing	Clarke	Alabama	Unknown	Unknown	Unknown	1 death — A tornado wrecked a mill, ramp, church, and three homes. Debris was strewn for many miles. One person was injured.
F2	Hartwell	Hart	Georgia	Unknown	Unknown	Unknown	Several homes were reportedly damaged or destroyed.

=== May 1 event ===
Confirmed tornadoes – Saturday, May 1, 1909
F#	Location	County / Parish	State	Time (UTC)	Path length	Max. width	Summary
F3	S of Milford to SE of Albany	Baker, Dougherty	Georgia	08:30–?	30 mi (48 km)	300 yd (270 m)	6 deaths – This intense tornado affected 11 plantations, obliterating tenant homes on some of them. 25 people were injured.
F2	Meigs	Thomas, Mitchell	Georgia	09:00–?	5 mi (8.0 km)	150 yd (140 m)	1 death — A fertilizer factory and several small homes were wrecked. One person was injured and losses totaled $40,000.
F2	Southwestern Savannah	Chatham	Georgia	16:55–?	0.5 mi (0.80 km)	50 yd (46 m)	1 death — The uppermost level of a four-story building was torn off, and a small home was wrecked. A 300-pound (140 kg) slab of concrete was moved 3,000 ft (0.57 mi; 0.91 km). One person was injured.

=== Horn Lake, Mississippi/Bolivar–Scotts Hill, Tennessee ===
Horn Lake, Mississippi/Bolivar–Scotts Hill, Tennessee
F4 tornado
- on the Fujita scale

Overall effects
- Casualties: ≥29 fatalities, ≥100 injuries

This violent, long-tracked tornado family killed at least 14—and possibly as many as 20—people in Mississippi. Twin tornadoes may have been responsible for these deaths, which occurred around and in the southern and northern outskirts, respectively, of Horn Lake. Crossing into Tennessee, the tornado struck and damaged 30 homes near Whitehaven. Five fatalities occurred in Fayette County: a few on a farmstead and three at a poorhouse. Farther along, 20 homes were damaged on the outskirts of Newcastle; one of the homes was leveled despite having been well constructed, indicating F4-intensity damage. Farmsteads, including numerous barns and six farmhouses, were wrecked near Bolivar, with 13 injuries and a death. Eight or more people were injured near Toome, along with four more near Whiteville. At Montezuma many stores and homes were destroyed, with a dozen people injured. Three deaths may have occurred near Lula. Near Scotts Hill many small homes were wrecked, with nine fatalities. Meat from smokehouses was carried a few miles distant. Two injuries occurred at Perryville, and a final death and four injuries in Perry County.

== Aftermath, recovery, and records ==
Prior to 2017, the outbreak, with 60 confirmed deaths, was the deadliest known tornado outbreak to affect Tennessee until March 21, 1952, when 66 people died statewide. However, reanalysis subsequently confirmed more than 90 fatalities in the state, once again making this outbreak the deadliest—even the April 3–4, 1974, Super Outbreak and the February 5–6, 2008, Super Tuesday outbreak produced just 45 and 31 deaths each in the state, respectively.

== See also ==
- List of North American tornadoes and tornado outbreaks

== Sources ==
- Abbe, Cleveland; Abbey Jr., Cleveland, eds. (April 1909). "Tornadoes in Tennessee" (PDF). Monthly Weather Review. 37 (4). Washington, D.C.: 152–3. Bibcode:1909MWRv...37..152.. doi:10.1175/1520-0493(1909)37[152:TIT]2.0.CO;2. Archived from the original (PDF) on February 25, 2017.
- Belden, W. S. (April 1909). Abbe, Cleveland; Abbey Jr., Cleveland (eds.). "Tornadoes in Mississippi" (PDF). Monthly Weather Review. 37 (4). Washington, D.C.: 153. Bibcode:1909MWRv...37..153B. doi:10.1175/1520-0493(1909)37[153a:TIM]2.0.CO;2. Archived from the original (PDF) on March 3, 2017.
- Brooks, Harold E. (April 2004). "On the Relationship of Tornado Path Length and Width to Intensity". Weather and Forecasting. 19 (2): 310–19. Bibcode:2004WtFor..19..310B. doi:10.1175/1520-0434(2004)019<0310:OTROTP>2.0.CO;2.
- Cook, A. R.; Schaefer, J. T. (August 2008). "The Relation of El Niño–Southern Oscillation (ENSO) to Winter Tornado Outbreaks". Monthly Weather Review. 136 (8): 3121–3137. Bibcode:2008MWRv..136.3121C. doi:10.1175/2007MWR2171.1.
- Grazulis, Thomas P. (May 1984). Violent Tornado Climatography, 1880–1982. OSTI (Technical report). NUREG. Washington, D.C.: Nuclear Regulatory Commission. OSTI 7099491. CR-3670.
  - — (November 1990). Significant Tornadoes 1880–1989. Vol. 2. St. Johnsbury, Vermont: The Tornado Project of Environmental Films. ISBN 1-879362-02-3.
  - — (July 1993). Significant Tornadoes 1680–1991: A Chronology and Analysis of Events. St. Johnsbury, Vermont: The Tornado Project of Environmental Films. ISBN 1-879362-03-1.
  - — (2001a). The Tornado: Nature's Ultimate Windstorm. Norman: University of Oklahoma Press. ISBN 978-0-8061-3538-0.
  - — (2001b). F5-F6 Tornadoes. St. Johnsbury, Vermont: The Tornado Project of Environmental Films.
- Horton, E. C. (April 1909). Abbe, Cleveland; Abbey Jr., Cleveland (eds.). "Tornado in Alabama" (PDF). Monthly Weather Review. 37 (4). Washington, D.C.: 154. Bibcode:1909MWRv...37..154H. doi:10.1175/1520-0493(1909)37[154a:TIA]2.0.CO;2. Archived from the original (PDF) on February 25, 2017.
- Rose, M. A. (2004). "A tornado climatology of middle Tennessee (1830-2003)" (PDF). NWAS Electronic Journal of Operational Meteorology. 5 (4). National Weather Association: 1–12. Archived from the original (PDF) on February 17, 2012.
