= Tornado outbreak of June 23–24, 1952 =

Weather event in the United States

Tornado outbreak
- Tornadoes: 7
- Max. rating: F4 tornado
- Duration: 1 day, 4 hours, 30 minutes
- Highest winds: 63 mph (101 km/h)

Overall effects
- Fatalities: 2 (+3 non-tornadic)
- Injuries: 35 (+3 non-tornadic)
- Damage: $22.500 million (1952 USD) $273 million (2025 USD)
- Areas affected: Great Plains, Midwestern United States
- Part of the tornado outbreaks of 1952

A destructive tornado outbreak impacted the Great Plains and Midwestern United States on June 23–24, 1952, generating several significant (F2+) tornadoes. Most of the tornadoes and casualties occurred in June 23, when an F4 tornado injured four an Iowa and an F3 tornado killed two and injured six in Wisconsin. Minneapolis, Minnesota was struck by long-tracked F2 tornadoes on both outbreak days, causing a combined 25 injuries alone. Overall, at least seven tornadoes were confirmed, killing two, injuring 35, and causing $22.5 million in damage.

== Meteorological synopsis ==
The outbreak was caused by two low-pressure systems in the region. The first one formed late on June 21 in Eastern Colorado. This low eventually moved slowly northeastward into Southern Nebraska on June 23 before accelerating and dissipating later that day over the Buffalo Ridge in Southwestern Minnesota's portion of Coteau des Prairies. As that low dissipated another low formed over Extreme Northwestern Kansas in the High Plains and tracked northeastward through the central part of Nebraska through June 24. Environmental conditions were favorable the development of localized severe thunderstorms, some of which became tornadic.

== Confirmed tornadoes ==
Confirmed tornadoes by Fujita rating
FU	F0	F1	F2	F3	F4	F5	Total
0	2	0	3	1	1	0	7

=== June 23 event ===
- Tornado researcher Thomas P. Grazulis listed an additional tornado:
  - An F3-level event destroyed an entire farmstead near Danube in Renville County, Minnesota. The tornado was also in the CDNS report. It is officially unrecorded.

List of confirmed tornadoes – Monday, June 23, 1952 (Note: All dates are based on the local time zone where the tornado touched down; however, all times are in Coordinated Universal Time and dates are split at midnight CST/CDT for consistency.) (Note: Prior to 1994, only the average widths of tornado paths were officially listed.)
F#	Location	County / Parish	State	Start coord.	Time (UTC)	Path length	Max. width	Summary
F2	ESE of Benson to W of Sunburg	Swift	MN	45.3°N 95.5°W	22:30–?	8.4 miles (13.5 km)	220 yards (200 m)	This tornado was likely one of several, embedded within a 150-square-mile (390 km^{2}) series of downbursts, and caused "great destruction" along its path through farmland. Several tornadoes were probably responsible for the damage but were officially unrecorded. A number of barns were destroyed near Benson. Losses totaled $2.5 million. The tornado was rated F3 by Grazulis.
F4	SSW of Marcus to Southern Cleghorn to Southern Larrabee to SSW of Peterson	Cherokee	IA	42.75°N 95.85°W	00:30–?	24.1 miles (38.8 km)	400 yards (370 m)	This large, violent tornado first touched down south-southwest of Marcus. It moved east-northeastward, passing 4 miles (6.4 km) south of the town while causing major damage to farms in the region. It then clipped the south side of Cleghorn as it continued to damage or destroy farms across the region. It then continued to be strong to violent as it moved through areas northeast of town. Afterwards, it passed 2 miles (3.2 km) south and east of Larrabee while continuing to damage or destroy farms. The tornado then weakened and dissipated south-southwest of Peterson. In all, 53 farmsteads were hit, with 13 of them being completely demolished and 34 suffered major damage. There were four injuries and $2.5 million in damage.
F0	Forestburg	Sanborn	SD	42.75°N 95.85°W	00:55–?	2 miles (3.2 km)	43 yards (39 m)	A tornado was photographed as it occasionally touched down near Forestburg over a 20-minute period. Fences, haystacks, and corn plants were destroyed. Damage was only estimated to be $30.
F2	Jeffers to Lafayette to Chaska to Eden Prairie	Cottonwood, Brown, Nicollet, Sibley, Carver, Hennepen	MN	44.00°N 95.28°W	02:30–?	104.8 miles (168.7 km)	220 yards (200 m)	A long-tracked tornado, which was probably a tornado family due to the path being non-continuous, moved through several counties southwest of Minneapolis, dissipating in the southwestern suburbs of the city. About 70 barns, silos, steel granaries, windmills, farm machinery, and automobiles were destroyed. Many homes, buildings, and barns were damaged and poultry and livestock were killed. Plate-glass windows were blown in, hundreds of trees were uprooted, power poles and wires were down and growing crops were damaged. Major damage occurred south of Lake Minnetonka as well. 10 people were injured and damage was estimated to be $10 million. The tornado was not listed as significant by Grazulis.
F3	St. Croix Falls to Centuria to Bone Lake	Polk	WI	45.42°N 92.63°W	03:30–?	18.2 miles (29.3 km)	100 yards (91 m)	2 deaths – This possible tornado was later confirmed. Severe damage occurred along its path, especially in Centuria, with a dozen homes being unroofed by the tornado. Witnesses did not see the funnel cloud, but said that the wind was of explosive force. A man was killed by flying debris as he sought shelter while a woman was killed in the basement of a small home that was obliterated. Six people were injured and damage was estimated at $2.5 million.

=== June 24 event ===
List of confirmed tornadoes – Tuesday, June 24, 1952
F#	Location	County / Parish	State	Start coord.	Time (UTC)	Path length	Max. width	Summary
F0	NE of Philip	Haakon	SD	44.18°N 101.45°W	16:00–?	0.1 miles (0.16 km)	23 yards (21 m)	An airline pilot reported a funnel cloud that touched down about 15 miles (24 km) northeast of Philip. A damage estimate of $30 was given for this tornado.
F2	NW of Cleveland to Downtown Minneapolis to Lino Lakes	Le Sueur, Scott, Hennepin, Ramsey, Anoka	MN	44.33°N 93.85°W	00:30–?	70.9 miles (114.1 km)	267 yards (244 m)	A long-tracked tornado, which was probably a tornado family, first touched down near Cleveland and moved northeastward, causing severe damage along its path. It moved through the southwestern part of the Minneapolis suburbs before entering Downtown Minneapolis. After moving through it, it continued northeastward, going through the northeastern suburbs of Minneapolis before dissipating near Lino Lakes. About 35 houses, barns, outbuildings, garages, large canvas tent, silos, windmills, steel granaries, farm machinery, and automobiles were destroyed while many other homes, buildings, barns, an automobile racing speedway, hangars, and several airplanes were damaged. Poultry and some livestock were killed, hundreds of trees uprooted, many poles, wires, radio and television antennae down, plate-glass windows were blown in and growing crops damaged. A number of reports of funnel-shaped clouds were observed and a large trailer truck heavily loaded with tombstones was lifted off the road in extreme southern Anoka County and wrecked. In all, 15 people were injured and losses total $5 million. Grazulis rated the tornado F3 and described the event as a complex of tornadoes and downbursts.

== Non-tornadic impacts ==
Severe storms struck a large portion of the Central Plains, Great Lakes, and the Southeastern and Northeastern United States.There were 3 fatalities and 3 injuries.

== See also ==
- List of North American tornadoes and tornado outbreaks
  - List of tornadoes striking downtown areas
