= Tornado outbreak of May 21–24, 1952 =

Weather event in the United States

Meteorological history
- Formed: May 21, 1952
- Dissipated: May 24, 1952

Tornado outbreak
- Tornadoes: 16
- Max. rating: F4 tornado
- Duration: 2 days, 23 hours

Overall effects
- Fatalities: 11 non-tornadic
- Injuries: 8 (+15 non-tornadic)
- Damage: $1.588 million (1952 USD)
- Areas affected: Central Plains, Great Lakes, Southeastern United States
- Part of the tornado outbreaks of 1952

A destructive severe weather and tornado outbreak struck the Central Plains, Great Lakes, Southeastern United States over a four day period. Multiple strong tornadoes were confirmed as well as widespread severe hail and wind, lightning, and heavy rain. One violent F4 tornado, which may have reached F5 intensity, caused severe damage between Lawrence and Kansas City, Kansas, injuring three people. Although the tornadoes themselves only caused eight injuries, scores of fatalities and additional injuries came from the non-tornadic effects as well.

== Meteorological synopsis ==
Two low-pressure systems formed over the Central Plains; the first one formed over Southeast Colorado on May 21 and moved eastward before moving northeastward in front of a second, slower moving low-pressure center that formed over south central South Dakota and moved into northeastern Nebraska. Both these lows moved eastward before the first one dissipated over Eastern Iowa while the other followed generally the same path as its predecessor. It moved through the Great Lakes region through May 25, before acceleration northeastward into Ontario, Canada. In the meantime, the complex setup led to a large area of severe thunderstorms, some of which became tornadic.

== Confirmed tornadoes ==
Confirmed tornadoes by Fujita rating
FU	F0	F1	F2	F3	F4	F5	Total
0	3	7	5	0	1	0	16

=== May 21 event ===
- The CDNS listed an additional tornado:
  - A tornado occurred in Arvada, Colorado. The condensation funnel did not reach the ground and damage was light. Some birds were killed when they were drawn into the funnel.

List of confirmed tornadoes – Wednesday, May 21, 1952 (Note: All dates are based on the local time zone where the tornado touched down; however, all times are in Coordinated Universal Time and dates are split at midnight CST/CDT for consistency.) (Note: Prior to 1994, only the average widths of tornado paths were officially listed.)
F#	Location	County / Parish	State	Start coord.	Time (UTC)	Path length	Max. width	Summary
F0	NNW of Alton	Osborne	KS	39.52°N 99.00°W	00:00–?	0.1 miles (0.16 km)	33 yards (30 m)	The NCEI officially records a brief tornado that touched in expansive area of severe storms that affected nine counties. No damage estimate was given.
F2	Kackley	Republic	KS	39.68°N 97.87°W	01:30–?	0.2 miles (0.32 km)	100 yards (91 m)	A small, but destructive tornado destroyed every building on a farm except the house and killed 50 chickens and six small pigs. Small hail and rain accompanied the tornado, which caused $25,000 in damage. The tornado may have started in Jewel County, where a barn was destroyed.

=== May 22 event ===
List of confirmed tornadoes – Thursday, May 22, 1952
F#	Location	County / Parish	State	Start coord.	Time (UTC)	Path length	Max. width	Summary
F4	Lawrence to E of Wilder	Douglas, Leavenworth, Wyandotte, Johnson	KS	38.98°N 95.22°W	23:00–?	26.9 miles (43.3 km)	440 yards (400 m)	A violent tornado accompanied by hail touched down on the northeastern side of Lawrence and destroyed an alfalfa dehydrator and caused minor damage elsewhere. It skipped east-northeastward before touching down solidly again on the north side of the Kansas River and moving into the south side of Kansas City at rate of about 70 miles per hour (110 km/h). 12 homes and 67 other buildings were destroyed, including a bank president's home that was leveled, 14 other homes and 13 other building were damaged, and 20 cows, 1,200 chickens, 15 hogs, and 5 sheep were killed. 11 miles (18 km) of power lines and thousands of trees were blown down as well. Tornado expert Thomas P. Grazulis indicated that the tornado may have possibly reached F5 intensity. Three people were injured and damages were estimated at $250,000. The CDNS report lists 13 injuries form this tornado.
F2	Lake Lotawana	Johnson	MO	38.93°N 94.23°W	01:00–01:10	1.3 miles (2.1 km)	440 yards (400 m)	A tornado accompanied by strong winds damaged a few houses, barns, and outbuildings. One person was injured and damages were estimated at $250,000. The CDNS report does not list any injuries. A funnel cloud was spotted north of nearby Lee's Summit about two hours later, but it did not touch down.
F1	SSE of Rush Springs	Grady	OK	34.75°N 97.92°W	05:30–?	0.1 miles (0.16 km)	33 yards (30 m)	A barn was damaged and moved about 25 feet (7.6 m) with damages estimated at $250.

=== May 23 event ===
List of confirmed tornadoes – Friday, May 23, 1952
F#	Location	County / Parish	State	Start coord.	Time (UTC)	Path length	Max. width	Summary
F1	NW of Cushing	Payne	OK	36.02°N 96.82°W	10:00–?	0.1 miles (0.16 km)	33 yards (30 m)	A farmstead was destroyed, with losses totaling $2,500. A gasoline plant in Cushing suffered $20,000 in damage from straight-line winds and six cows were killed when lightning struck a tree they were huddled under.
F1	E of Snyder to NW of Meers	Kiowa, Comanche	OK	34.67°N 98.87°W	10:30–?	16.9 miles (27.2 km)	100 yards (91 m)	A skipping tornado touched down twice, destroying two barns and causing $2,500 in damage.
F2	Lawton	Comanche	OK	34.62°N 98.42°W	10:45–?	0.3 miles (0.48 km)	150 yards (140 m)	A tornado damaged several buildings as it moved eastward about three blocks. One person was injured and losses totaled $250,000.
F2	Fort Sill	Comanche	OK	34.65°N 98.43°W	11:00–?	0.1 miles (0.16 km)	200 yards (180 m)	This tornado touched down northwest of the previous one. It destroyed four warehouses and one smaller building with losses totaling $250,000.
F0	Brownsboro	Henderson	TX	32.22°N 95.62°W	17:40–?	0.5 miles (0.80 km)	33 yards (30 m)	Buildings were unroofed and plate glass windows were pulled out of buildings. Losses totaled $2,500. It is possible that this tornado was the last of the day rather than fifth according to the CDNS report.
F2	Dumont	Butler	IA	42.75°N 92.97°W	19:00–?	0.1 miles (0.16 km)	17 yards (16 m)	"Long tapering funnel moved northward." A town garage was unroofed and telephone poles were knocked down, interrupting electric service. No damage estimate was given.
F0	Brooksville	Hernando	FL	28.55°N 82.38°W	19:30–?	0.1 miles (0.16 km)	33 yards (30 m)	A tornado wrecked a chicken house and damaged others, killing a number of chickens. A physician was injured when his car was struck by the tornado on the highway, spinning it around several times and before ejecting him. Loses totaled $2,500. Heavy rain and hail preceded the tornado.
F1	San Angelo	Tom Green	TX	31.45°N 100.48°W	20:30–?	7.1 miles (11.4 km)	50 yards (46 m)	A few chicken houses and a house was damaged, injuring one person and causing $2,500 in damage.
F1	Grafton	Worth	IA	43.33°N 93.08°W	21:00–?	0.1 miles (0.16 km)	33 yards (30 m)	A funnel cloud was observed moving northeastward at 20–25 miles per hour (32–40 km/h). A barn was demolished while only minor damage occurred nearby. A few chickens were also killed. No damage estimate was given.

=== May 24 event ===
List of confirmed tornadoes – Saturday, May 24, 1952
F#	Location	County / Parish	State	Start coord.	Time (UTC)	Path length	Max. width	Summary
F1	Bedford	Cuyahoga	OH	41.42°N 81.50°W	21:05–?	0.1 miles (0.16 km)	200 yards (180 m)	Several observers reported the passage of a "dark, funnel cloud without an attendant thunderstorm, hail, or rain, although rain had preceded the storm." It moved northeastward through the business district in the downtown area before striking a residential area. Roofs were damaged, signs and utility lines were destroyed, trees were leveled, windows were broken, and several garages were demolished. A large plate-glass window on the front of a business was blown outward while other windows in path of storm were blown inward. Losses totaled $25,000.
F1	Belleville	St.Clair	IL	39.50°N 90.02°W	23:50–?	0.1 miles (0.16 km)	33 yards (30 m)	A tornado moved down a runway at Scott Air Force Base, damaging 14 aircraft. A small building was also partially demolished. Losses totaled $25,000. Hail and strong winds also caused additional damage to crops in the area.

== Non-tornadic impacts ==
=== May 21 ===
Severe hail, lightning, damaging winds, heavy rain affected parts of Kansas and Oklahoma on March 21. In Sedgwick County, Kansas, a church was struck by lightning, tearing a hole into it. A house was also struck by lightning, damaging the roof and injuring two people who were sleeping. Northwest of Harmon, Oklahoma a farmer driving a tractor was struck by lightning and killed.

=== May 22 ===
1/2 inch (1.3 cm) hail caused spotted damage to wheat crops in the south central Marshall County, Kansas with individual losses amounting to 60 to 75 percent of crops with more extensive damage to wheat crops in Frankfort and Bigelow. Another hailstorm caused damage in Pawnee County, Nebraska while irregular shaped hail up to tennis ball size caused major damage in Caney, Kansas. Hail caused severe damage to 51 roofs in Cleveland and Pawnee Counties in Oklahoma with scattered damage to wheat in Tillman County, especially near Grandfield. Hail up to 3 inches (7.6 cm) in diameter caused major damage in Beckham and Washita Counties, especially in the town of Port, where 50 to 100 percent of wheat was destroyed, damaged roofs, cars were dented, and hail drifts were knee deep. There was wind damage to multiple buildings and lightning burned down a barn. Six picnickers in Kansas City were injured when the tree they were huddling under was struck by lightning, with one of them being hospitalized for severe burns.

=== May 23 ===
A large area of severe weather struck an area from Texas to the west, Michigan to the north, Louisiana to the south and Mississippi to the east. A swath of damaging winds struck an area from near Okarche to Cashion, Oklahoma. About 100,000 acres of wheat and other small cropland were affected by these winds. Severe hail also occurred between Okarche and Seward. Total hail loss to crops, including near ripe wheat, was estimated at $2 million. Almost every structure in Okarche had hail damage to their roofs, with total damage estimated at $25,000. A woman in Cashion was also injured by flying glass. In Oklahoma City, a house was struck by lightning with two occupants left injured when it caught fire. Another house suffered minor damage when it was also struck by lightning. Another home was engulfed in flames in Tahlequah when it was struck by lightning, resulting in the deaths of nine children as well as three other injuries. Strong straight-line winds damaged an industrial plant on the north side of Magnolia, Arkansas, injuring one person. A lightning fatality also occurred in Jackson, Mississippi when a child was struck and killed while riding a bicycle.

=== May 24 ===
Lightning from the previous day's storms struck a radio shop in Selina, Kansas, starting a fire which resulted in $330 in damage to the building as well as $1,000 in damage to its contents. The only other severe weather reported on this day occurred near Palmyra, Missouri, where hail destroyed crops and damaged roofs, windows, and vehicles. The same storm also produced lightning that killed three cows and destroyed a farm outbuilding while damaging another one.

== See also ==
- List of North American tornadoes and tornado outbreaks
  - List of F4 and EF4 tornadoes
  - List of F5 and EF5 tornadoes
