= Tornado outbreak of March 21–22, 1952 =

Severe weather event in the United States

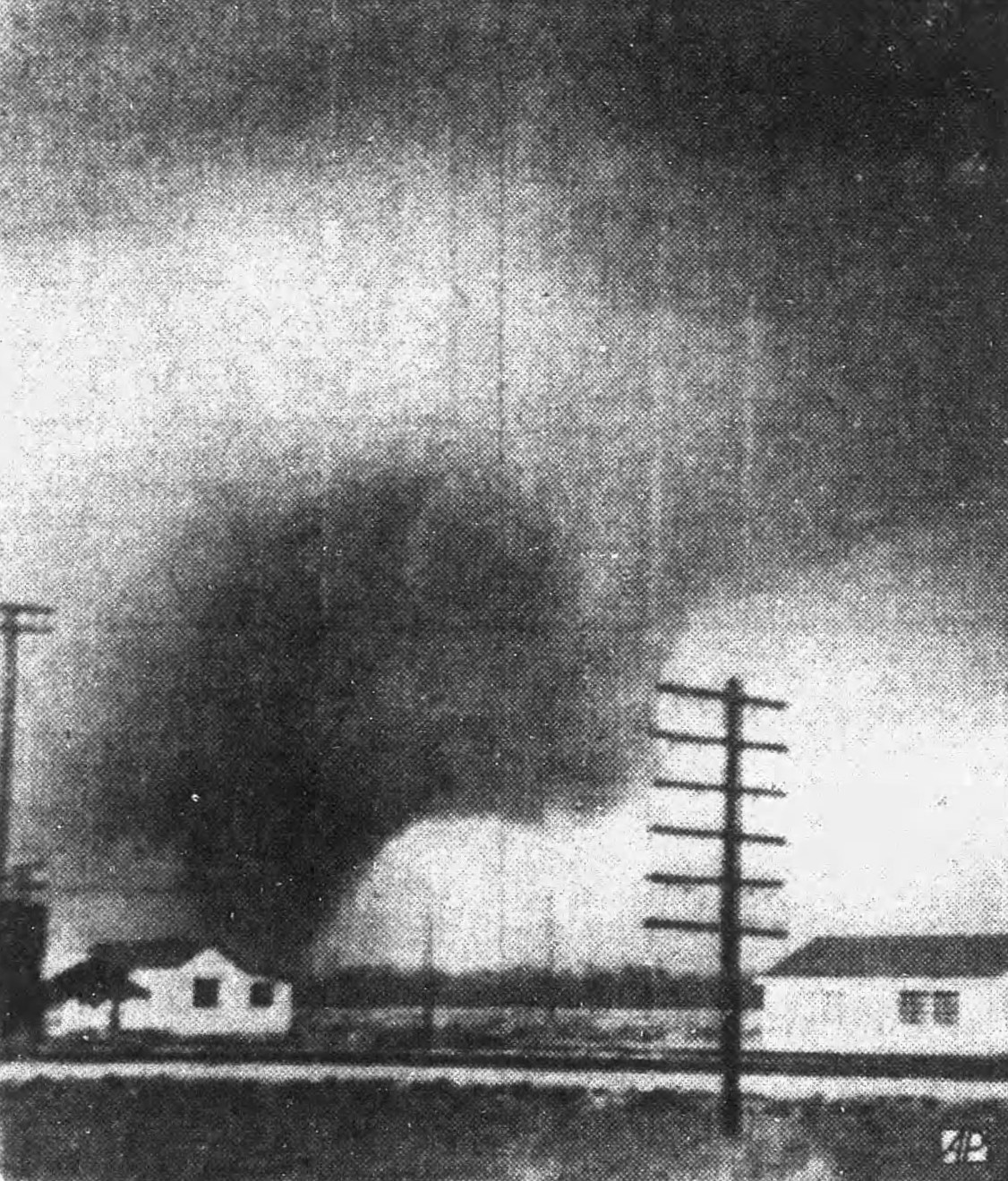
- A photo of a large F4 tornado near Hazen, Arkansas on March 22.

Tornado outbreak
- Tornadoes: 21
- Max. rating: F4 tornado
- Duration: March 21–22, 1952

Overall effects
- Fatalities: 209+
- Injuries: ≥ 1,304
- Damage: $13,151,000 ($159,440,000 in 2025 USD) (Note: All losses are in 1952 United States dollars unless otherwise noted.)
- Areas affected: Southern United States (primarily the Mississippi Alluvial Plain), especially Arkansas, Tennessee, and Missouri
- Part of the tornadoes and tornado outbreaks of 1952

On March 21–22, 1952, a destructive and deadly tornado outbreak generated eight violent tornadoes across the Southern United States, causing 209 fatalities—50 of which occurred in a single tornado in Arkansas. In addition, this tornado outbreak is the second deadliest on record to ever affect the state of Tennessee, with 66 of the fatalities associated with this outbreak occurring in the state; this is only surpassed by the 90 fatalities from a tornado outbreak in 1909, and in terms of fatalities is well ahead of both the 1974 Super Outbreak and the Super Tuesday tornado outbreak, each of which resulted in 45 and 31 fatalities, respectively. The severe weather event also resulted in the fourth-largest number of tornado fatalities within a 24-hour period since 1950. To date this was considered the most destructive tornado outbreak in Arkansas on record. (Note: An outbreak is generally defined as a group of at least six tornadoes (the number sometimes varies slightly according to local climatology) with no more than a six-hour gap between individual tornadoes. An outbreak sequence, prior to (after) the start of modern records in 1950, is defined as a period of no more than two (one) consecutive days without at least one significant (F2 or stronger) tornado.)

== Background ==
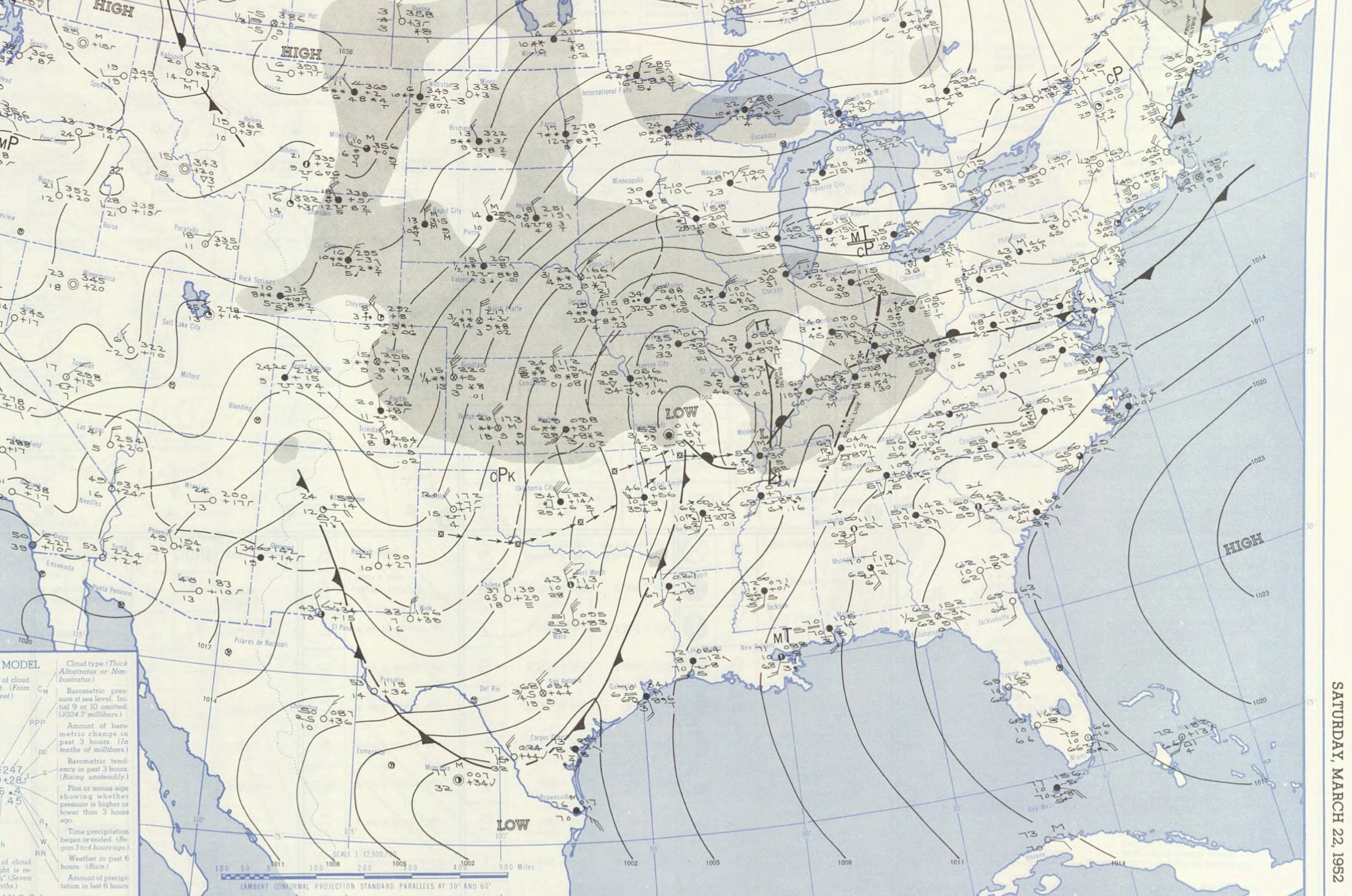
Surface weather analysis on March 22, showing the low pressure area that would produce the tornado outbreak across the Southern United States

A large low pressure system raced across the Northern Pacific before reaching the coast of the Southern Alaska Panhandle on March 17. A new low formed from the original one and moved quickly southeastward through Canada and the Great Plains before turning eastward over Northern Oklahoma during the afternoon of March 19. It subsequently moved into Southwestern Missouri near Joplin and shot northeastward as another low that had formed in Nevada on March 19 surged into the region on March 21 and made a gradual northeastward turn through North Texas, Southeastern Oklahoma, and Northwestern Arkansas before turning northward on March 22 after it entered Illinois. Favorable conditions in the atmosphere led to a massive area of strong and severe thunderstorms that produced damaging winds, large hail, heavy rain, flooding, lightning, and tornadoes.

== Outbreak statistics ==
Daily statistics of tornadoes during the tornado outbreak of March 21–22, 1952
Date (Note: All dates are based on the local time zone where the tornado touched down; however, all times are in Coordinated Universal Time and dates are split at midnight CST/CDT for consistency.)	Total	F-scale rating (Note: The Fujita scale was devised under the aegis of scientist T. Theodore Fujita in the early 1970s. Prior to the advent of the scale in 1971, tornadoes in the United States were officially unrated. Tornado ratings were retroactively applied to events prior to the formal adoption of the F-scale by the National Weather Service. While the Fujita scale has been superseded by the Enhanced Fujita scale in the U.S. since February 1, 2007, Canada used the old scale until April 1, 2013; nations elsewhere, like the United Kingdom, apply other classifications such as the TORRO scale.)							Deaths	Injuries	Damage (Note: The National Oceanic and Atmospheric Administration's Storm Data publication does not list exact damage totals for every event, instead giving damage categories. As such, damage for individual tornadoes is not comprehensive.)
Date	Total	FU	F0	F1	F2	F3	F4	F5	Deaths	Injuries	Damage
March 21	16	0	1	0	5	3	7	0	202+	≥ 1,225	$12,642,000
March 22	5	0	0	0	3	1	1	0	7	79	$509,000
Total	21	0	1	0	8	4	8	0	209+	≥ 1,304	$13,151,000

== Confirmed tornadoes ==
Confirmed tornadoes by Fujita rating
FU	F0	F1	F2	F3	F4	F5	Total
0	1	0	8	4	8	0	21

Prior to 1990, there is a likely undercount of tornadoes, particularly E/F0–1, with reports of weaker tornadoes becoming more common as population increased. A sharp increase in the annual average E/F0–1 count by approximately 200 tornadoes was noted upon the implementation of NEXRAD Doppler weather radar in 1990–1991. (Note: Historically, the number of tornadoes globally and in the United States was and is likely underrepresented: research by Grazulis on annual tornado activity suggests that, as of 2001, only 53% of yearly U.S. tornadoes were officially recorded. Documentation of tornadoes outside the United States was historically less exhaustive, owing to the lack of monitors in many nations and, in some cases, to internal political controls on public information. Most countries only recorded tornadoes that produced severe damage or loss of life. Significant low biases in U.S. tornado counts likely occurred through the early 1990s, when advanced NEXRAD was first installed and the National Weather Service began comprehensively verifying tornado occurrences.) 1974 marked the first year where significant tornado (E/F2+) counts became homogenous with contemporary values, attributed to the consistent implementation of Fujita scale assessments. Numerous discrepancies on the details of tornadoes in this outbreak exist between sources. The total count of tornadoes and ratings differs from various agencies accordingly. The list below documents information from the most contemporary official sources alongside assessments from tornado historian Thomas P. Grazulis.

Symbol key
Symbol	Description
†	Data from Grazulis 1984/1990/1993/2001b
¶	Data from a local National Weather Service office
※	Data from the 1952 Climatological Data publications
‡	Data from the NCEI database
♯	Maximum width of tornado
±	Tornado was rated below F2 intensity by Grazulis but a specific rating is unavailable.

=== March 21 event ===
List of confirmed tornadoes – Friday, March 21, 1952
F#	Location	County / Parish	State	Start Coord. (Note: All starting coordinates are based on the NCEI database and may not reflect contemporary analyses)	Time (UTC)	Path length	Width (Note: The listed width values are primarily the average/mean width of the tornadoes, with those having known maximum widths denoted by ♯. From 1952 to 1994, reports largely list mean width whereas contemporary years list maximum width. Values provided by Grazulis are the average width, with estimates being rounded down (i.e. 0.5 mi (0.80 km) is rounded down from 880 yards to 800 yards.)	Damage
F4	N of Provo to northwestern Dierks to WSW of Newhope†	Howard	AR	34.02°N 94.02°W	21:00–21:15※	13 mi (21 km)	800 yd (730 m)†	$151,500※
F4	7 deaths – This violent tornado, the first member of a long-lived tornado family, destroyed 22 homes on the outskirts of Dierks, most of which were frail, and killed livestock and poultry. Many homes southwest of town were flattened, sustaining F4 damage, and trees were stripped of their bark. Nine people were injured.							
F2†	In and near Paron※	Saline※	AR	34.72°N 92.82°W	22:00–22:15※	15 mi (24 km)†	400 yd (370 m)†	$39,000※
F2†	This tornado originated in the same supercell as the Dierks event. Near Paron, it destroyed one home and unroofed several others. Barns and a church were wrecked as well. A number of livestock died or sustained injuries. The NCEI list the path as extending east-northeastward, from southwest of Paron to east of Ferndale, but available descriptions indicate that the tornado headed northeastward, striking Paron.							
F2	W of Mayflower to S of Saltillo†	Faulkner	AR	34.95°N 92.42°W	22:30–?†	8 mi (13 km)†	Unknown	$15,000※
F2	A strong tornado wrecked many small homes near Mayflower and destroyed or damaged six other homes near Saltillo. A few people were injured.							
F4	SSW of Searcy to Judsonia※ to western Russell†	White	AR	35.22°N 91.70°W	22:50–?‡	22 mi (35 km)†	2,640 yd (2,410 m)♯※	$3,500,000※
F4	50+ deaths – This large, intense tornado was 1 1/2 mi (2.4 km) wide at times. After impacting northwestern Kensett, it passed through the business district of Judsonia and damaged or destroyed 945 structures in town. In all, at least 30 deaths were confirmed in Judsonia alone, and the town itself was virtually destroyed. 20 more deaths occurred between Bald Knob and Russell. Damage also occurred near Midway, and 500-pound (230 kg) concrete blocks were tossed 80 yd (240 ft). 325 injuries occurred along the path. The tornado became the fourth deadliest in the U.S. state of Arkansas on record.							
F4†	SW of England to northwestern Cotton Plant† to Hillemann※	Lonoke, Prairie, Woodruff	AR	34.53°N 91.80°W	23:00–?	70 mi (110 km)†	800 yd (730 m)†	$700,000†
F4†	40+ deaths – This violent, long-tracked tornado first wrecked 40 homes on the northwestern outskirts of England, the majority of which were poorly built, killing nine people. South of Hazen, near Tollville, the tornado destroyed 42 more homes and claimed a few additional lives in the vicinity. The tornado then ravaged the northwestern part of Cotton Plant, where 29 people lost their lives. The tornado also caused extensive damage in Hillemann before apparently dissipating. In all the tornado injured 274 people and was the sixth deadliest in Arkansas on record. Some additional deaths may have occurred in rural areas, and the tornado may have continued as far as Vanndale, just north of Wynne.							
F4†	SW of Wattensaw to Georgetown to NE of Hickory Ridge†	Lonoke, Prairie, White†, Woodruff, Jackson†, Cross※	AR	34.90°N 91.85°W	23:17–?※	65 mi (105 km)†	600 yd (550 m)†	$700,000†
F4†	8 deaths – This tornado, closely paralleling the preceding event, killed two people and injured six others as it struck the rural community of Wattensaw. Afterward, it successively impacted and devastated all or part of Hickory Plains, Georgetown, McCrory, and Hickory Ridge. In this swath many brick homes were flattened, along with those of lesser construction. Two of the eight fatalities, along with 15 injuries, occurred at Hickory Plains and four more at Hickory Ridge. The villages of McCrory and Georgetown were virtually leveled, and 116 homes were destroyed or damaged at Hickory Ridge. In all, 50 people were injured.							
F3†	Bruceville to E of RoEllen† to Churchton※	Lauderdale†, Dyer, Gibson†	TN	36.02°N 89.20°W	23:35–?※	20 mi (32 km)†	200 yd (180 m)	Unknown
F3†	1+ death – This intense tornado passed through or near Bruceville, Bonicord, Tatumville, Edgewood, and Lapata. In all 17 homes were wrecked, and 20 injuries occurred. Grazulis assessed this tornado as an F4 in 1984, but reduced its ranking nine years later. Other estimates of the death toll range from two to four.							
F2†	SE of Blackville to E of Balch† to near Lake City	Jackson, Poinsett†, Craighead※	AR	35.47°N 91.20°W	23:40–?	40 mi (64 km)†	440 yd (400 m)‡	$21,000※
F2†	This tornado, which generated only sporadic damage, formed from the same storm as the Judsonia–Bald Knob F4. It damaged or destroyed 15 homes in Jackson County, many of which were small. Intermittent damage began near Weldon and occurred as far as Cash. In all, six people sustained injuries.							
F3	Fisher† to N of Harrisburg to NE of Blytheville※	Poinsett, Craighead†, Mississippi※	AR	35.60°N 90.72°W	~00:45–01:45※	70 mi (110 km)†	600 yd (550 m)†	$1,500,000†
F3	4 deaths – This intense tornado family destroyed or damaged at least 45 structures between Fisher and Trumann. Between Milligan Ridge and Blytheville, the tornado destroyed or damaged 300 homes. In all, the tornado, which also affected areas in and near Caraway, destroyed or damaged about 650 homes. At least 57 injuries were reported along the path.							
F2†	SW of Marked Tree※ to ENE of Lepanto	Poinsett※	AR	35.53°N 90.42°W	01:45–01:50※	10 mi (16 km)†	200 yd (180 m)	Unknown
F2†	1 death – This strong tornado developed in the same storm as the England–Cotton Plant F4. It destroyed or damaged 23 homes, one or more of which were small. It also just barely missed the town of Alto. Seven injuries occurred.							
F4	Near Yarbro (AR) to near Cooter (MO) to between Elbridge (TN) and Ridgely (TN)†	Mississippi (AR)†, Pemiscot (MO), Dyer (TN)†, Lake (TN)†, Obion (TN)†	AR†, MO, TN†	36.05°N 89.82°W	02:00–?	30 mi (48 km)†	2,500 yd (2,300 m)♯※	$1,500,000†
F4	25+ deaths – This large, violent tornado, attended by hail, was up to 2,500 yd (7,500 ft; 1.4 mi; 2.3 km) wide at times and damaged or destroyed up to 200 homes, many of which were small, frail tenant homes, along with many farmsteads. After passing just north of Cottonwood Point, Missouri, the tornado then traversed the Mississippi River into Tennessee, and passed just south of Owl Hoot. A vehicle was reportedly thrown 1 mi (1.6 km). In all, 150 people were injured. The tornado formed from the same storm as the Fisher–Blythevile F3.							
F3	SW of Unionville to eastern Dyersburg to NW of Kenton†	Dyer, Gibson†, Obion†	TN	35.95°N 89.43°W	02:10†–?	30 mi (48 km)†	Unknown	Unknown
F3	9+ deaths – This intense tornado first destroyed more than 12 homes and caused two deaths in the community of Unionville. After barely missing the town of Fowlkes, the tornado ravaged part of Dyersburg. At the Dyersburg Regional Airport, the tornado destroyed a hangar, numerous airplanes, and a new administration building. Along the path, the tornado destroyed 15 farmsteads. 50 people were injured, and a tenth death may have occurred.							
F0	Madison	Madison	MS	32.47°N 90.12°W	02:30–?	1 mi (1.6 km)※	20 yd (18 m)	$1,000※
F0	A brief tornado was observed. One person was injured.							
F4	SW of Byhalia (MS) to Cayce (MS)※ to SSE of Williston (TN)†	Marshall (MS), Fayette (TN)	MS, TN	34.87°N 89.68°W	03:45–?※	35 mi (56 km)†	300 yd (270 m)†	$200,000†
F4	17 deaths – This extremely violent tornado may have been a family, merging with a second, undocumented tornado upon formation. Along its path, it destroyed 38 homes, causing particularly severe damage near Byhalia and Moscow, Tennessee. It was once classified as an F5, based on the destruction of a concrete block structure; however, as the building was not steel-reinforced, the Storm Prediction Center later reduced the intensity to F4. In all, 94 people were injured.							
F2†	SW of Medina to Bruceton† to NNW of Lipe‡	Madison†, Gibson, Carroll, Benton‡	TN	35.80°N 88.78°W	04:30†–05:17※	40 mi (64 km)†	400 yd (370 m)†	$1,000,000†
F2†	2+ deaths – This strong, long-lived tornado passed through the Milan Arsenal, southeast of Milan, destroying or damaging 30 buildings, including barracks, and 65 vehicles. Losses at the arsenal totaled $500,000 and three injuries occurred there. After passing near Lavinia, the tornado then destroyed 12 homes near Leach. The tornado then wrecked three homes and demolished the business district in Bruceton. In all, 23 people sustained injuries. A few additional fatalities may have occurred.							
F4	SW of Bolivar to northern Henderson† to Chesterfield※ to near Bible Hill†	Hardeman, Chester, Henderson※, Decatur†	TN	35.27°N 88.98°W	04:45†–05:30※	65 mi (105 km)†	1,200 yd (1,100 m)†	$3,315,000※
F4	38 deaths – This devastating tornado damaged or destroyed 609 homes, impacting Henderson—a large swath of which incurred borderline-F5 damage—killing 23 people there, and claimed 11 more lives between Darden and Jacks Creek. It developed in the same storm as the Byhalia–Moscow F4 and may have been the same tornado. 157 people were injured along the path. The areas between Silerton and south-southwest of Lexington would be hit again by an F2 tornado just under one year later.							

=== March 22 event ===
List of confirmed tornadoes – Saturday, March 22, 1952
F#	Location	County / Parish	State	Start Coord.	Time (UTC)	Path length	Width	Damage
F2†	Downtown† Carthage※	Smith	TN	36.25°N 85.93°W	05:15†–?	0.3 mi (0.48 km)‡	100 yd (91 m)※	$24,000※
F2†	This brief tornado unroofed and destroyed a large building. A few other structures incurred damage nearby and one person was injured.							
F2	SW of Buffalo※	Humphreys	TN	35.85°N 87.68°W	05:55–?	1 mi (1.6 km)†	500 yd (460 m)	$50,000※
F2	This brief, strong tornado formed from the same storm as the Bolivar–Henderson F4. It destroyed several barns, damaged outbuildings, and unroofed three homes on farmsteads in and near Squeeze Bottom.							
F3	Southern Hodgenville※	LaRue	KY	37.53°N 85.72°W	06:05–06:10※	3 mi (4.8 km)※	100 yd (91 m)†	$250,000
F3	This intense tornado passed near the Abraham Lincoln Birthplace National Historical Park. It damaged or destroyed 61 homes, nine of which were cottages, and the county fairgrounds. The tornado also unroofed a warehouse and flattened several barns. A total of 18 injuries occurred. The NCEI incorrectly list the path as extending from northwest of Buffalo to east-southeast of White City.							
F2±	SSE of Spot	Hickman	TN	35.87°N 87.58°W	06:20–?	0.5 mi (0.80 km)‡	40 yd (37 m)	$35,000※
F2±	3 deaths – In a rural area this tornado damaged or destroyed nine homes and injured 10 people. Grazulis did not list this tornado at all, implying that it was a downburst, microburst, or other strong, convectively generated wind. The tornado passed east of the Bucksnort–Only area.							
F4	Massey to Winton to southern Redstone Arsenal†	Morgan, Madison※	AL	34.60°N 87.00°W	20:45†–?	25 mi (40 km)†	100 yd (91 m)	$150,000※
F4	4 deaths – This violent tornado moved through areas near Hartselle and ended south of Decatur. It damaged or destroyed 84 structures, including 35 homes, many of which sustained F4 damage, though due to poor quality of construction the rating is somewhat questionable. 50 injuries were confirmed. The NCEI incorrectly places the track as going from northeast of Moulton Heights to south-southwest of Huntsville via Decatur and Mooresville.							

== Other effects ==
The weather system associated with the outbreak also produced several inches of snow across the central and northern Great Plains and the upper Midwest. Blizzard conditions affected Kansas, Nebraska, and South Dakota. A significant blizzard affected the Great Plains. In Kansas, 15 in (38 cm) of snow were recorded. On March 22, Charles City, Iowa, documented 11.6 in (29 cm), which was the town's greatest 24-hour snowfall record at the time. Minnesota reported 17 in (43 cm), while Bergland, Michigan, reported 2 ft (0.61 m) of snowfall. Heavy snow and strong winds disrupted highways and road traffic. Flash floods also affected Sumner and Clay counties, Tennessee.

== See also ==
- List of tornadoes and tornado outbreaks
  - List of North American tornadoes and tornado outbreaks
    - List of F4 and EF4 tornadoes
- Tornado records
- 1932 Deep South tornado outbreak – Produced 10 violent tornadoes exactly 20 years earlier
- 1965 Palm Sunday tornado outbreak – Generated 17 F4 or F5 tornadoes
- March 1997 tornado outbreak – Deadliest tornado outbreak in Arkansas since May 15, 1968
- 2008 Super Tuesday tornado outbreak – Affected some of the same regions as the 1952 outbreak
- 1974 Super Outbreak – The most violent outbreak on record and the largest to date
- 2011 Super Outbreak – The largest outbreak on record

== Sources ==
- Agee, Ernest M.; Childs, Samuel (June 1, 2014). "Adjustments in Tornado Counts, F-Scale Intensity, and Path Width for Assessing Significant Tornado Destruction". Journal of Applied Meteorology and Climatology. 53 (6). American Meteorological Society: 1494–1505. Bibcode:2014JApMC..53.1494A. doi:10.1175/JAMC-D-13-0235.1.
- Barto, E. M. (March 1952). Written at Nashville, Tennessee. "Tennessee – March 1952". Special Weather Summary. Climatological Data. 57 (3). Asheville, North Carolina: National Climatic Data Center: 26.
- Brooks, Harold E. (April 2004). "On the Relationship of Tornado Path Length and Width to Intensity". Weather and Forecasting. 19 (2): 310–19. Bibcode:2004WtFor..19..310B. doi:10.1175/1520-0434(2004)019<0310:OTROTP>2.0.CO;2.
- Carr, J. A. (March 1952). "A Preliminary Report on the Tornadoes of March 21–22, 1952". Monthly Weather Review. 80 (3): 50–8. Bibcode:1952MWRv...80...50C. doi:10.1175/1520-0493(1952)080<0050:APROTT>2.0.CO;2.
- Cook, A. R.; Schaefer, J. T. (August 2008). "The Relation of El Niño–Southern Oscillation (ENSO) to Winter Tornado Outbreaks". Monthly Weather Review. 136 (8): 3121–3137. Bibcode:2008MWRv..136.3121C. doi:10.1175/2007MWR2171.1.
- Edwards, Roger; LaDue, James G.; Ferree, John T.; Scharfenberg, Kevin; Maier, Chris; Coulbourne, William L. (May 1, 2013). "Tornado Intensity Estimation: Past, Present, and Future". Bulletin of the American Meteorological Society. 94 (5). American Meteorological Society: 641–653. Bibcode:2013BAMS...94..641E. doi:10.1175/BAMS-D-11-00006.1.
- Gordon, John D.; Boyd, Bobby; Rose, Mark; Wright, Jason B. (2000). "The Forgotten F5: The Lawrence County Supercell During the Middle Tennessee Tornado Outbreak of 16 April 1998" (PDF). National Weather Digest. 24 (4). Norman, Oklahoma: National Weather Association: 3–10. Archived from the original (PDF) on December 18, 2012. "The authors sent a detailed letter to the SPC recommending the two tornadoes from 1974, and the 1952 tornado mentioned above, be downgraded to F4. The SPC agreed to all three of these changes. The SPC database now reflects the conclusions of Professor Fujita's map of 1974, and Grazulis 1952 tornado report (1993). ... The authors suggested that the three former F5 tornadoes in Tennessee should be reclassified as F4. These changes have been adopted, making the 16 April 1998 Lawrence County tornado the only documented F5 in the history of Tennessee."
- Grazulis, Thomas P. (May 1984). Violent Tornado Climatography, 1880–1982. OSTI (Technical report). NUREG. Washington, D.C.: Nuclear Regulatory Commission. OSTI 7099491. CR-3670.
  - — (November 1990). Significant Tornadoes 1880–1989. Vol. 2. St. Johnsbury, Vermont: The Tornado Project of Environmental Films. ISBN 1-879362-02-3.
  - — (July 1993). Significant Tornadoes 1680–1991: A Chronology and Analysis of Events. St. Johnsbury, Vermont: The Tornado Project of Environmental Films. ISBN 1-879362-03-1.
  - — (2001a). The Tornado: Nature's Ultimate Windstorm. Norman: University of Oklahoma Press. ISBN 978-0-8061-3538-0.
  - — (2001b). F5-F6 Tornadoes. St. Johnsbury, Vermont: The Tornado Project of Environmental Films.
- Hickmon, Walter C. (March 1952). Written at Little Rock, Arkansas. "Arkansas – March 1952". Special Weather Summary. Climatological Data. 57 (3). Asheville, North Carolina: National Climatic Data Center: 26, 30.
- National Weather Service (March 1952). Storm Data Publication (Report). National Centers for Environmental Information – via Storm Events Database.
- U.S. Weather Bureau (March 1952). "Storm data and unusual weather phenomena". Climatological Data National Summary. 3 (3). Asheville, North Carolina: National Climatic Data Center: 71–4.
