= Beech Hill, Franklin County, Tennessee =

Unincorporated community in Tennessee, U.S.

Coordinates: 35°13′20″N 86°17′38″W

Beech Hill is an unincorporated community in Franklin County, in the U.S. state of Tennessee.

== History ==
The community was likely named from the presence of beech trees near the town site. A violent F4 tornado destroyed the town on February 13, 1952.
