= New Lexington, Alabama =

- Unincorporated community
- Location within Alabama Location within the United States
- Coordinates: 33°33′44″N 87°39′27″W
- Country: United States
- State: Alabama
- County: Tuscaloosa
- Elevation: 430 ft (130 m)
- Time zone: UTC-6 (Central (CST))
  - Summer (DST): UTC-5 (CDT)
- Area codes: 205, 659
- GNIS feature ID: 152656

New Lexington, also known as Halberts, is an unincorporated community in Tuscaloosa County, Alabama, United States. New Lexington is located along U.S. Route 43, 10.5 miles (16.9 km) north of Samantha.

== History ==
The community was originally known as Halberts, and was named for Joshua Halbert. Halbert was one of the earliest settlers of Tuscaloosa County, and established the first hotel in Tuscaloosa. The community name was later changed to New Lexington, likely in honor of Lexington, South Carolina. A post office operated under the name Halberts from 1826 to 1836, and under the name New Lexington from 1836 to 1915.
