= Decherd, Tennessee =

- City
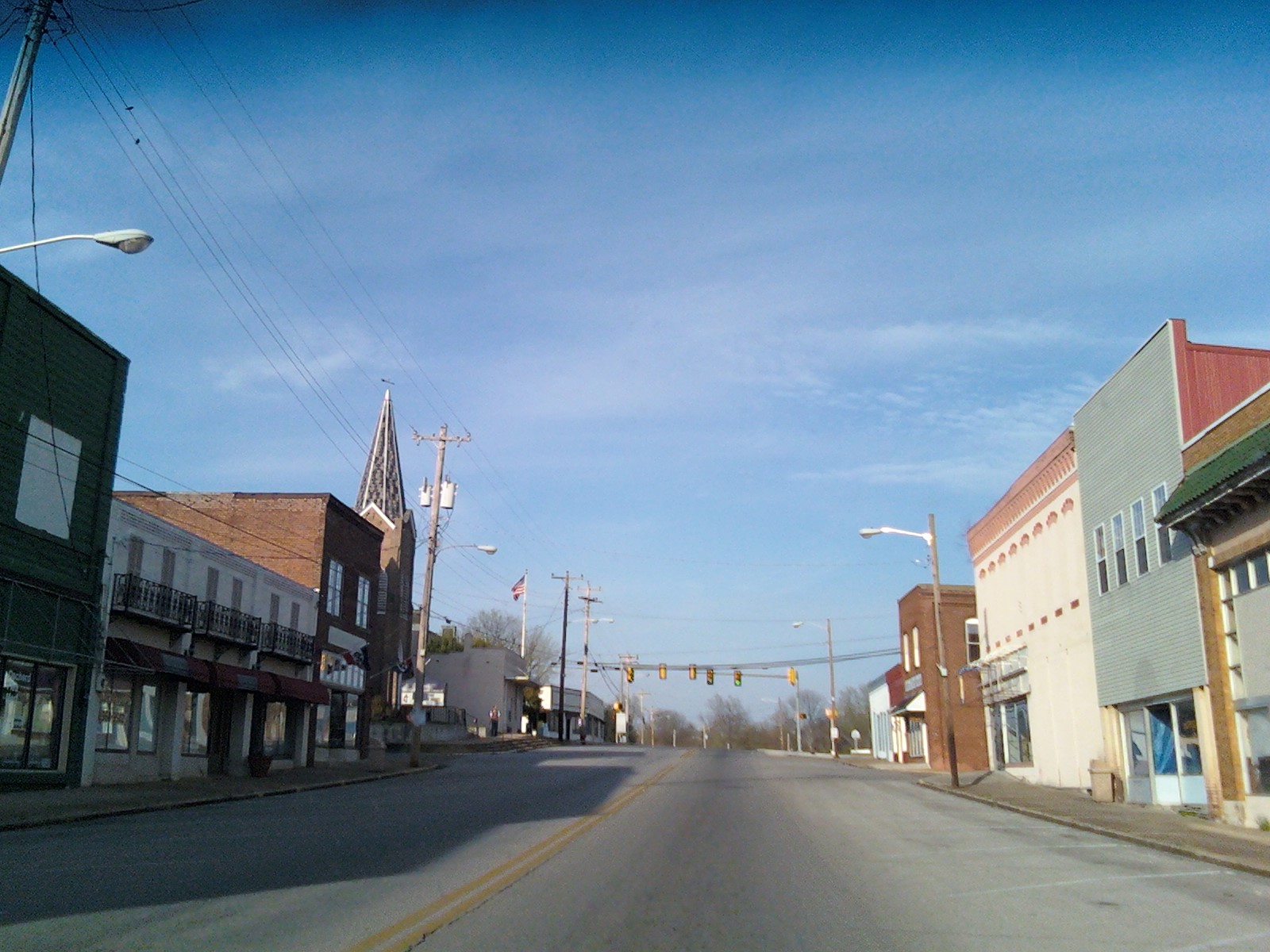
- Old Decherd, on State Route 50

- Location of Decherd in Franklin County, Tennessee.
- Coordinates: 35°12′57″N 86°4′45″W
- Country: United States
- State: Tennessee
- County: Franklin

Area
  - Total: 4.80 sq mi (12.44 km^{2})
  - Land: 4.80 sq mi (12.42 km^{2})
  - Water: 0.0077 sq mi (0.02 km^{2})
- Elevation: 961 ft (293 m)

Population (2020)
  - Total: 2,379
  - Density: 496.1/sq mi (191.55/km^{2})
- Time zone: UTC-6 (Central (CST))
  - Summer (DST): UTC-5 (CDT)
- ZIP code: 37324
- Area code: 931
- FIPS code: 47-19920
- GNIS feature ID: 1282276
- Website: www.decherdtn.gov

Decherd is a city in Franklin County, Tennessee, United States. The population was 2,379 at the 2020 census and 2,361 at the 2010 census.

== History ==
Peter Decherd came to the area in 1831 from Franklin County, Virginia and set up a plantation in Winchester TN that came to be known as Hundred Oaks. In the 1850s he granted right-of-way to the Nashville and Chattanooga Railroad from property he owned.

On February 14, 1856, the thirty-first General Assembly of the state of Tennessee incorporated the town of Decherd with all the rights and privileges as the town of Cookeville, which was also incorporated at that time.

After the Civil War, Decherd was again incorporated as a town on January 30, 1868. It was unincorporated in 1885 to avoid application of the "Four Mile Law", which permitted liquor sales within four miles of schools located in incorporated communities. The town was chartered once again by the General Assembly on April 22, 1901. The Haynes House in Decherd is listed on the National Register of Historic Places.

A violent F4 tornado heavily damaged the northern part of the town on February 13, 1952.

The historic Asia School is located in Decherd.

== Geography ==
Decherd is located at 35°12′57″N 86°4′45″W (35.215767, -86.079183).

According to the United States Census Bureau, the city has a total area of 4.7 square miles (12 km^{2}), of which 4.7 square miles (12 km^{2}) is land and 0.21% is water which is part of Tims Ford Lake.

Decherd is immediately adjacent to the county seat of Winchester.

== Demographics ==
Historical population
Census	Pop.	Note	%±
1880	1,008		—
1890	725		−28.1%
1910	1,022		—
1920	815		−20.3%
1930	876		7.5%
1940	868		−0.9%
1950	1,435		65.3%
1960	1,704		18.7%
1970	2,148		26.1%
1980	2,233		4.0%
1990	2,196		−1.7%
2000	2,246		2.3%
2010	2,361		5.1%
2020	2,379		0.8%

=== 2020 census ===
As of the 2020 census, Decherd had a population of 2,379. The median age was 40.9 years; 22.2% of residents were under the age of 18 and 18.1% of residents were 65 years of age or older. For every 100 females there were 90.8 males, and for every 100 females age 18 and over there were 85.6 males age 18 and over.

Racial composition as of the 2020 census
Race	Number	Percent
White	1,804	75.8%
Black or African American	236	9.9%
American Indian and Alaska Native	19	0.8%
Asian	41	1.7%
Native Hawaiian and Other Pacific Islander	0	0.0%
Some other race	62	2.6%
Two or more races	217	9.1%
Hispanic or Latino (of any race)	148	6.2%

93.8% of residents lived in urban areas, while 6.2% lived in rural areas.

There were 1,026 households in Decherd, of which 28.8% had children under the age of 18 living in them. Of all households, 35.8% were married-couple households, 20.9% were households with a male householder and no spouse or partner present, and 34.7% were households with a female householder and no spouse or partner present. About 34.1% of all households were made up of individuals and 14.5% had someone living alone who was 65 years of age or older.

There were 1,142 housing units, of which 10.2% were vacant. The homeowner vacancy rate was 1.9% and the rental vacancy rate was 6.7%.

=== 2000 census ===
As of the census of 2000, there was a population of 2,246, with 960 households and 640 families residing in the city. The population density was 481.4 inhabitants per square mile (185.9/km^{2}). There were 1,048 housing units at an average density of 224.6 per square mile (86.7/km^{2}). The racial makeup of the city was 82.72% White, 14.47% African American, 0.40% Native American, 0.22% Asian, 0.04% Pacific Islander, 0.76% from other races, and 1.38% from two or more races. Hispanic or Latino of any race were 1.74% of the population.

There were 960 households, out of which 28.0% had children under the age of 18 living with them, 44.1% were married couples living together, 18.1% had a female householder with no husband present, and 33.3% were non-families. 29.3% of all households were made up of individuals, and 13.5% had someone living alone who was 65 years of age or older. The average household size was 2.34 and the average family size was 2.85.

In the city, the population was spread out, with 23.2% under the age of 18, 9.6% from 18 to 24, 27.1% from 25 to 44, 23.0% from 45 to 64, and 17.2% who were 65 years of age or older. The median age was 38 years. For every 100 females, there were 86.9 males. For every 100 females aged 18 and over, there were 80.7 males.

The median income for a household in the city was $27,750, and the median income for a family was $35,817. Males had a median income of $27,094 versus $19,088 for females. The per capita income for the city was $14,969. About 14.4% of families and 18.3% of the population were below the poverty line, including 24.9% of those under age 18 and 16.1% of those age 65 or over.

== Economy ==
Decherd is home to a large automobile engine assembly plant owned by Nissan. The Nissan Powertrain Assembly Plant at Decherd launched in 1997 and now produces 1.4 million engines a year for many Nissan cars, SUVs, and trucks, alongside powertrains for the all-electric Nissan Leaf. The Nissan Powertrain Plant employs over 1,600 employees. In 2014 a second plant on the same property was launched to produce engines for Infiniti and Daimler.

== Notable people ==
- Benjamin Baker Moeur, governor of Arizona from 1933–1937.
- Ed Murray, speaker of the Tennessee House of Representatives.
