= List of United States tornadoes in 1951 =

Documented List of Confirmed Tornadoes in the United States, 1951

This page documents all U.S. tornadoes confirmed in 1951. Due to lack of modern radar and storm spotters, tornado counts from this period are much lower than what we see today.

== Confirmed tornadoes ==
Confirmed tornadoes by Fujita rating
FU	F0	F1	F2	F3	F4	F5	Total
0	49	100	83	23	5	0	260

== January ==
Confirmed tornadoes by Fujita rating
FU	F0	F1	F2	F3	F4	F5	Total
0	0	0	1	1	0	0	2

=== January 6 event ===
List of confirmed tornadoes – Saturday, January 6, 1951 (Note: All dates are based on the local time zone where the tornado touched down; however, all times are in Coordinated Universal Time for consistency.)
F#	Location	County / Parish	State	Start Coord.	Time (UTC)	Path length	Max width	Summary	Refs
F3	Alexandria to Tioga to Simms to Pollock	Rapides, Grant	LA	31.30°N 92.47°W	20:30-20:40	16.8 mi (27.0 km)	317 yd (290 m)	Tornado developed within a squall line and moved north-northward through the Alexandria metropolitan area with damaging winds extending several miles from the circulation. The towns of Sieps, Tioga, Simms, and Pollock were all severely damaged as well. In the end, two houses and four stores were destroyed while another 42 homes and 11 building damaged. Damages are estimated at $500,000 and 11 people were injured.	

=== January 11 event ===
List of confirmed tornadoes – Thursday, January 11, 1951
F#	Location	County / Parish	State	Start Coord.	Time (UTC)	Path length	Max width	Summary	Refs
F2	Los Gatos to Sunnyvale	Santa Clara	CA	37.34°N 122.0°W	16:25-16:30	5.30 mi (8.53 km)	880 yd (800 m)	A powerful tornado developed within a severe cold front and a squall line that produced straight line winds in Northern California. This tornado began in Los Gatos, destroying a railroad station near Sunnyvale, lifting a 32-ton crane and hurling it into a parking lot. The tornado then traveled to Sunnyvale, causing severe damage to over 250 homes, with 24 losing there roofs and shifted from there foundations; nine families were left homeless; other structures collapsed. A power plant had extensive roof damage, with some portions of it being removed entirely, more then 2000 workers were sent home, the turbine shop also collapsed. The tornado caused $1,500,000 in damage and 30 people were injured. This was the most destructive and intense tornado in California, and it was considered to be "the third most damaging tornado of the year."	

== February ==
Confirmed tornadoes by Fujita rating
FU	F0	F1	F2	F3	F4	F5	Total
0	1	4	4	1	0	0	7

=== February 1 event ===
List of confirmed tornadoes – Thursday, February 1, 1951
F#	Location	County / Parish	State	Start Coord.	Time (UTC)	Path length	Max width	Summary	Refs
F1	NE of Appomattox	Appomattox	VA	37.37°N 78.78°W	19:00	0.1 mi (0.16 km)	50 yd (46 m)	Brief tornado damaged a barn and a number of other outbuildings. Trees were also uprooted along the path. Damages are estimated at $2.5 thousand.	

=== February 6 event ===
List of confirmed tornadoes – Tuesday, February 6, 1951
F#	Location	County / Parish	State	Start Coord.	Time (UTC)	Path length	Max width	Summary	Refs
F1	NW of Leonville	St. Landry	LA	30.50°N 92.00°W	21:50	0.5 mi (0.80 km)	33 yd (30 m)	Damages are estimated at $25 thousand.	
F1	E of Hammond	Tangipahoa	LA	30.48°N 90.42°W	23:00	4.9 mi (7.9 km)	33 yd (30 m)	Small rain wrapped tornado damaged a few houses and signboards. Damages are estimated at $25 thousand.	

=== February 19 event ===
List of confirmed tornadoes – Monday, February 19, 1951
F#	Location	County / Parish	State	Start Coord.	Time (UTC)	Path length	Max width	Summary	Refs
F2	W of El Reno	Caddo, Canadian, Kingfisher	OK	35.27°N 98.18°W	00:30–02:00	43.9 mi (70.7 km)	20 yd (18 m)	Several tornadoes were possibly counted along the 45-mile path. When the tornado first touched down in Caddo County, five people were injured when two houses and one store had their roofs torn off. As the tornado entered southern Canadian County, several farms were damaged. In El Reno, two buildings were damaged, with the cooperative weather station being demolished. The tornado continued into Kingfisher County where it dissipated. Damages are estimated at $50,000 and five people were injured.	
F0	S of Norman	McClain	OK	35.15°N 97.45°W	04:00–04:15	0.1 mi (0.16 km)	100 yd (91 m)	One farm building was hit by this brief tornado. Damages are estimated at $0.25 thousand.	

=== February 20 event ===
List of confirmed tornadoes – Tuesday, February 20, 1951
F#	Location	County / Parish	State	Start Coord.	Time (UTC)	Path length	Max width	Summary	Refs
F2	Keo to Marked Tree	Lonoke, Prairie, Woodruff, Cross, St. Francis, Poinsett	AR	34.60°N 92.02°W	15:15	112.8 mi (181.5 km)	333 yd (304 m)	The second longest tracked tornado in the state of Arkansas started near the town of Keo. The twister continued northeast damaging and destroying several houses and farm buildings. The tornado lifted to the northeast of Marked Tree. Damages are estimated at $50,000 and three people were injured.	
F1	SW of Columbus	Lowndes	MS	33.47°N 88.48°W	21:00	0.1 mi (0.16 km)	33 yd (30 m)	Damages are estimated at $2,500.	
F3	WSW of Starkville	Oktibbeha	MS	33.45°N 88.87°W	21:00	0.1 mi (0.16 km)	33 yd (30 m)	1 death – A farm house and several outbuilding were destroyed. Damages are estimated at $2,500 and one person was injured.	
F2	W of Bankston	Fayette	AL	33.67°N 87.70°W	22:00	0.1 mi (0.16 km)	123 yd (112 m)	One building was completely demolished, while 15 others were damaged. Telephone and power lines also damaged. Damages are estimated at $25,000 and two injuries.	
F2	Bagdad	Shelby	KY	38.27°N 85.05°W	00:00	0.1 mi (0.16 km)	73 yd (67 m)	Several buildings, crops, and livestock damaged or destroyed as the tornado moved through Bagdad. Damages are estimated at $25,000.	

== March ==
Confirmed tornadoes by Fujita rating
FU	F0	F1	F2	F3	F4	F5	Total
0	1	2	2	1	0	0	6

=== March 2 event ===
List of confirmed tornadoes – Friday, March 2, 1951
F#	Location	County / Parish	State	Start Coord.	Time (UTC)	Path length	Max width	Summary	Refs
F3	E of Osborne to Jamestown	Osborne, Mitchell, Jewell, Cloud	KS	39.43°N 98.55°W	22:00-23:00	38.1 mi (61.3 km)	33 yd (30 m)	Long lasting tornado did damage to buildings, uprooted trees, and cut through wheat fields. Damages are estimated at $25,000.	
F0	S of Fairview	Brown	KS	39.83°N 95.72°W	02:30	0.1 mi (0.16 km)	33 yd (30 m)	One barn was destroyed. A roaring noise was heard in the town of Hiawatha. Damages are estimated at $25,000.	

=== March 12 event ===
List of confirmed tornadoes – Monday, March 12, 1951
F#	Location	County / Parish	State	Start Coord.	Time (UTC)	Path length	Max width	Summary	Refs
F2	Nokomis	Sarasota	FL	27.10°N 82.48°W	23:00	2 mi (3.2 km)	77 yd (70 m)	A waterspout moved ashore from the Gulf of Mexico causing damage to 20 buildings. Several of those buildings had roofs blown off and one was moved off its foundation. Power lines were also downed. Damages are estimated at $25 thousand.	

=== March 28 event ===
List of confirmed tornadoes – Wednesday, March 28, 1951
F#	Location	County / Parish	State	Start Coord.	Time (UTC)	Path length	Max width	Summary	Refs
F1	NW of Crockett	Houston	TX	31.37°N 95.60°W	11:10	0.5 mi (0.80 km)	17 yd (16 m)	Damages are estimated at $2.5 thousand.	

=== March 29 event ===
List of confirmed tornadoes – Thursday, March 29, 1951
F#	Location	County / Parish	State	Start Coord.	Time (UTC)	Path length	Max width	Summary	Refs
F2	Greenfield	Hancock	IN	39.78°N 85.77°W	00:30-01:00	3 mi (4.8 km)	400 yd (370 m)	2 injuries - Many farm buildings were destroyed, trees downed, and a few heads of livestock killed. One farmer was injured when they were blown into a field. Damages are estimated at $250 thousand.	

=== March 30 event ===
List of confirmed tornadoes – Friday, March 30, 1951
F#	Location	County / Parish	State	Start Coord.	Time (UTC)	Path length	Max width	Summary	Refs
F1	Gettysburg	Adams	PA	39.83°N 77.23°W	21:00	0.1 mi (0.16 km)	20 yd (18 m)	One house had its roof torn off west of Gettysburg. Damages are estimated at $2.5 thousand.	

== April ==
Confirmed tornadoes by Fujita rating
FU	F0	F1	F2	F3	F4	F5	Total
0	3	1	4	1	0	0	9

=== April 5 event ===
List of confirmed tornadoes – Thursday, April 5, 1951
F#	Location	County / Parish	State	Start Coord.	Time (UTC)	Path length	Max width	Summary	Refs
F2	Moore	Cleveland	OK	35.32°N 97.55°W	19:20-19:40	5.7 mi (9.2 km)	127 yd (116 m)	Damage to a school near Newcastle and to a farm house in Moore. Damages are estimated at $25 thousand.	
F2	W of Newcastle	Grady	OK	35.23°N 97.72°W	19:22-19:30	0.2 mi (0.32 km)	100 yd (91 m)	2 injuries - Damage to the Bridge Creek School. Damages are estimated at $250 thousand.	
F2	S of Waynoka	Woods	OK	36.53°N 98.92°W	22:45	3.6 mi (5.8 km)	33 yd (30 m)	2 injuries - A house and vehicle destroyed. Damages are estimated at $2.5 thousand.	

=== April 20 event ===
List of confirmed tornadoes – Friday, April 20, 1951
F#	Location	County / Parish	State	Start Coord.	Time (UTC)	Path length	Max width	Summary	Refs
F2	E Wichita Falls	Wichita	TX	33.92°N 98.45°W	21:10	1.5 mi (2.4 km)	17 yd (16 m)	Damages are estimated at $25 thousand.	
F0	W of Rolla	Morton	KS	37.12°N 101.77°W	21:30	0.1 mi (0.16 km)	33 yd (30 m)	Small tornado stayed over open country without causing damage.	

=== April 21 event ===
List of confirmed tornadoes – Saturday, April 21, 1951
F#	Location	County / Parish	State	Start Coord.	Time (UTC)	Path length	Max width	Summary	Refs
F1	N of Raleigh	Smith	MS	32.07°N 89.52°W	18:00	0.1 mi (0.16 km)	33 yd (30 m)	Damages are estimated at $25,000.	
F0	ENE of Chatham	Ouachita	LA	32.33°N 92.32°W	20:00	1 mi (1.6 km)	33 yd (30 m)	Damages are estimated at $25,000 and one person was injured.	
F0	SE of Georgetown	La Salle	LA	31.72°N 92.25°W	20:00	1 mi (1.6 km)	33 yd (30 m)	Damages are estimated at $25,000 and two people were injured.	
F3	W of Laurel to NE of Montrose	Jones, Jasper	MS	31.68°N 89.25°W	00:25-00:40	33.5 mi (53.9 km)	33 yd (30 m)	2 death – Damages are estimated at $50,000 and 16 people were injured.	

== May ==
There were 57 tornadoes confirmed in the US in May.

== June ==
There were 76 tornadoes confirmed in the US in June.

=== June 25 event ===
List of confirmed tornadoes – Monday, June 25, 1951 (Note: All dates are based on the local time zone where the tornado touched down; however, all times are in Coordinated Universal Time and dates are split at midnight CST/CDT for consistency.) (Note: Prior to 1994, only the average widths of tornado paths were officially listed.)
F#	Location	County / Parish	State	Start coord.	Time (UTC)	Path length	Max. width	Summary
F2	Dunnell to SSW of Fairmont	Martin	MN		21:00–?	14.2 miles (22.9 km)	10 yards (9.1 m)	Barns and outbuildings on 10 farms were demolished by this narrow, but strong northeastward-moving tornado. Homes and barns were damaged or moved from their foundations, granaries, silos, windmills, farm machinery, and automobiles were damaged or wrecked, poultry and livestock were killed, haystacks were scattered, trees were uprooted, power poles and wires were downed, and crops were damaged. Losses totaled $250,000. Very large hail to the size of tennis balls accompanied this tornado, causing additional damage to homes and property.
F2	Sidney	Cheyenne	NE		21:30–?	10.4 miles (16.7 km)	57 yards (52 m)	This narrow, but strong tornado struck the Sidney Municipal Airport, badly damaging a hangar, house trailer, and one plane, although a damage estimate was not given. One person was injured. The CDNS report list the start time as 20:50 UTC. The tornado was not rated as significant (F2+) by Grazulis.
F2	Duncan to Crystal Lake	Hancock	IA		23:07–?	.8 miles (1.3 km)	500 yards (460 m)	This destructive tornado, which was embedded within a much larger area of damaging winds and hail, caused catastrophic damage in and between Duncan and Crystal Lake. In Duncan, the tornado destroyed the largest buildings in town. A large church and community center as well as all 21 homes in town were damaged or destroyed. Four people were injured in the town. The tornado then demolished four rural farmsteads, killed livestock, and overturned a freight train before striking Crystal Lake. Four homes were demolished, many more were damaged and four people were injured. In all, eight people were injured. The storm as a whole caused $4.5 million in damage in Franklin and Hancock Counties, but the damage estimate from the tornado itself was not given. The CDNS report listed that the tornado caused a fatality in Duncan, but that was not included in the NCEI database. The NCEI track of the tornado only shows it striking Crystal Lake as well. Grazulis rated the tornado F3.
F1	S of Sedgwick to W of Holyoke	Sedgwick, Phillips	CO		23:45–?	20.2 miles (32.5 km)	33 yards (30 m)	Weak tornado damaged mostly crops, windows, and small buildings. One person was injured.

=== June 26 event ===
List of confirmed tornadoes – Tuesday, June 26, 1951 (Note: Prior to 1994, only the average widths of tornado paths were officially listed.)
F#	Location	County / Parish	State	Start coord.	Time (UTC)	Path length	Max. width	Summary
F1	Belleville	Wood	WV		20:00–?	.1 miles (0.16 km)	250 yards (230 m)	A waterspout developed over the Ohio River on the Ohio-West Virginia border and moved inland. One person was injured, although no damage estimate was given. The tornado was accompanied by strong straight-line winds that caused additional damage to farm buildings and trees.
F1	NW of Midland	Midland	MI		00:00–?	.1 miles (0.16 km)	33 yards (30 m)	Several trees, barns and a house were blown down. Damage was estimated at $25,000. Grazulis rated the tornado F2.

=== June 27 event ===
List of confirmed tornadoes – Wednesday, June 27, 1951 (Note: Prior to 1994, only the average widths of tornado paths were officially listed.)
F#	Location	County / Parish	State	Start coord.	Time (UTC)	Path length	Max. width	Summary
F4	WaKeeney	Trego	KS		06:10–?	.8 miles (1.3 km)	300 yards (270 m)	5 deaths – The roar of this short-lived, but violent tornado was heard just prior to it moving directly through WaKeeney shortly after midnight, causing catastrophic damage. A total of 45 homes were destroyed while 60 others were damaged. 100 people were injured and damage was estimated at $2.5 million. The tornado was accompanied by high winds and hail that caused additional damage.
F1	W of Hays	Ellis	KS		07:00–?	.1 miles (0.16 km)	33 yards (30 m)	This tornado came from the same storm that produced the Wakeeney tornado. A farm was damaged with losses totaling $2,500. The tornado was also accompanied by high winds and hail that caused additional damage.
F1	N of Seven Mile to Jacksonburg	Butler	OH		12:00–?	4.7 miles (7.6 km)	33 yards (30 m)	This tornado accompanied by heavy rain and strong winds caused severe damage along its path with losses totaling $2.5 million. The CDNS report says the tornado hit Carlisle as well.
F3	S of Latham to Heman to NW of Forsyth	Logan, Macon	IL		01:30–?	9.6 miles (15.4 km)	300 yards (270 m)	This tornado accompanied by heavy rain and severe activity completely destroyed two farms near Heman with Grazulis noting that this was "probable F4 damage". 35 people were injured and losses totaled $2.5 million.
F3	S of Emden to Northern Atlanta to N of Waynesville	Logan, De Witt	IL		01:30–?	18.2 miles (29.3 km)	200 yards (180 m)	1 death – This tornado accompanied by heavy rain and severe activity completely destroyed several farms along its path. 15 people were injured and losses totaled $2.5 million. Grazulis rated the tornado F2, although he noted that near-F3 damage occurred at one of the farms.
F2	Dayton to Smicksburg	Armstrong, Indiana	PA		01:30–?	19.7 miles (31.7 km)	33 yards (30 m)	This tornado touched down near Dayton and moved southeastward to Smicksburg. Two barns were unroofed, two silos demolished, trees were uprooted with some falling onto homes and across highways, and power and phone services disrupted. Losses totaled $2,500. The NCEI track has a path moving northeastward from north of Aultman through Beyer to Smicksburg. The tornado was not rated as significant by Grazulis.

== July ==
There were 23 tornadoes confirmed in the US in July.

== August ==
There were 27 tornadoes confirmed in the US in August.

== September ==
There were 9 tornadoes confirmed in the US in September.

=== September 26 event ===
Confirmed tornadoes – Wednesday, September 26, 1951 (Note: Prior to 1994, only the average widths of tornado paths were officially listed.)
F#	Location	County / Parish	State	Start coord.	Time (UTC)	Path length	Max. width	Damage
F4	NE of Blaine to Cobb Town to E of Manawa	Portage, Waupaca	WI	44.33°N 89.3°W	15:45–?	26.4 miles (42.5 km)	100 yards (91 m)	$500,000 (1951 USD)
F4	6 deaths – Several farm buildings were heavily damaged or destroyed with the greatest damage occurring just past Cobb Town about 3 miles (4.8 km) north of Waupaca. There, three farms were obliterated and swept away at near-F5 intensity. Five of the six people killed came from one family, who were killed as they were cleaning chickens on their porch on the opposite side of the house from the approaching tornado. The other fatality occurred in the Lebanon Township near Sugar Bush where a 40-year-old woman was killed in a flattened home. Three other people were injured.							
F4	N of Rio to SE of Cambria	Columbia	WI	43.47°N 89.25°W	16:30–?	9 miles (14 km)	100 yards (91 m)	$250,000 (1951 USD)
F4	1 death – A violent tornado struck a farm. There, a large house and every farm building was obliterated, including the house of the hired hand who was killed with debris from the home being left in a pile 300 feet (91 m) from the foundation. Hundreds of trees were stripped and/or uprooted, including some that were 18 inches (46 cm) in diameter, and chickens were defeathered. Officially, nine people were injured, although the CDNS report list 10 injuries. The tornado was rated F3 by tornado researcher Thomas P. Grazulis.							
F2	Lilley	Newaygo	MI	43.78°N 85.87°W	21:00–?	2.3 miles (3.7 km)	440 yards (400 m)	—N/a
F2	1 death – A strong tornado blew down the west and south concrete walls of a tavern before ripping off its roof. An I-beam was thrown 100 yards (91 m) while steel beams were thrown 70 yards (64 m). Three people were injured.							

== October ==
There were 2 tornadoes confirmed in the US in October.

== November ==
There were 12 tornadoes confirmed in the US in November.

== December ==
There were 10 tornadoes confirmed in the US in December.

== See also ==
- Tornadoes of 1951
- List of North American tornadoes and tornado outbreaks
