= Tornadoes of 1951 =

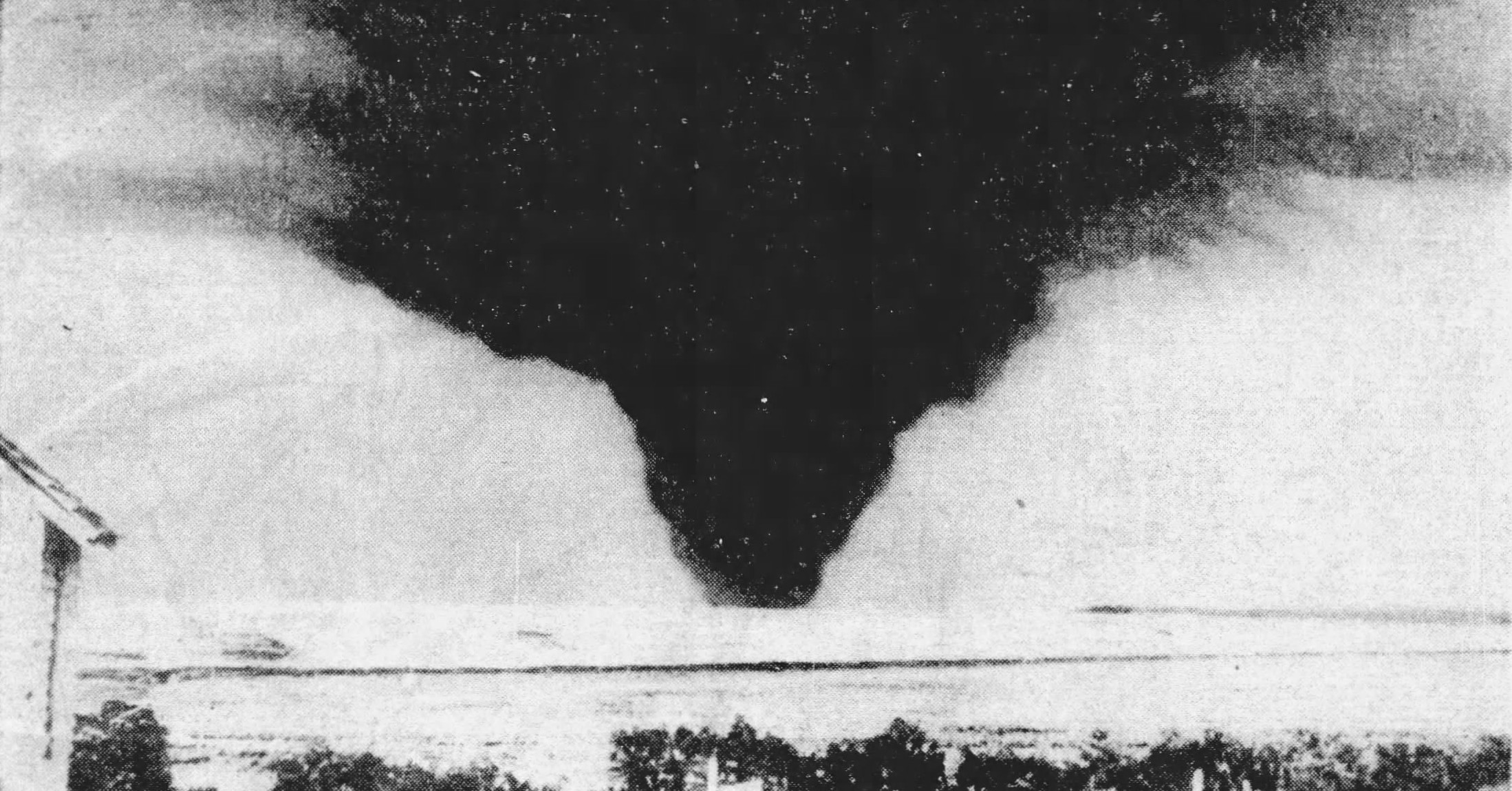
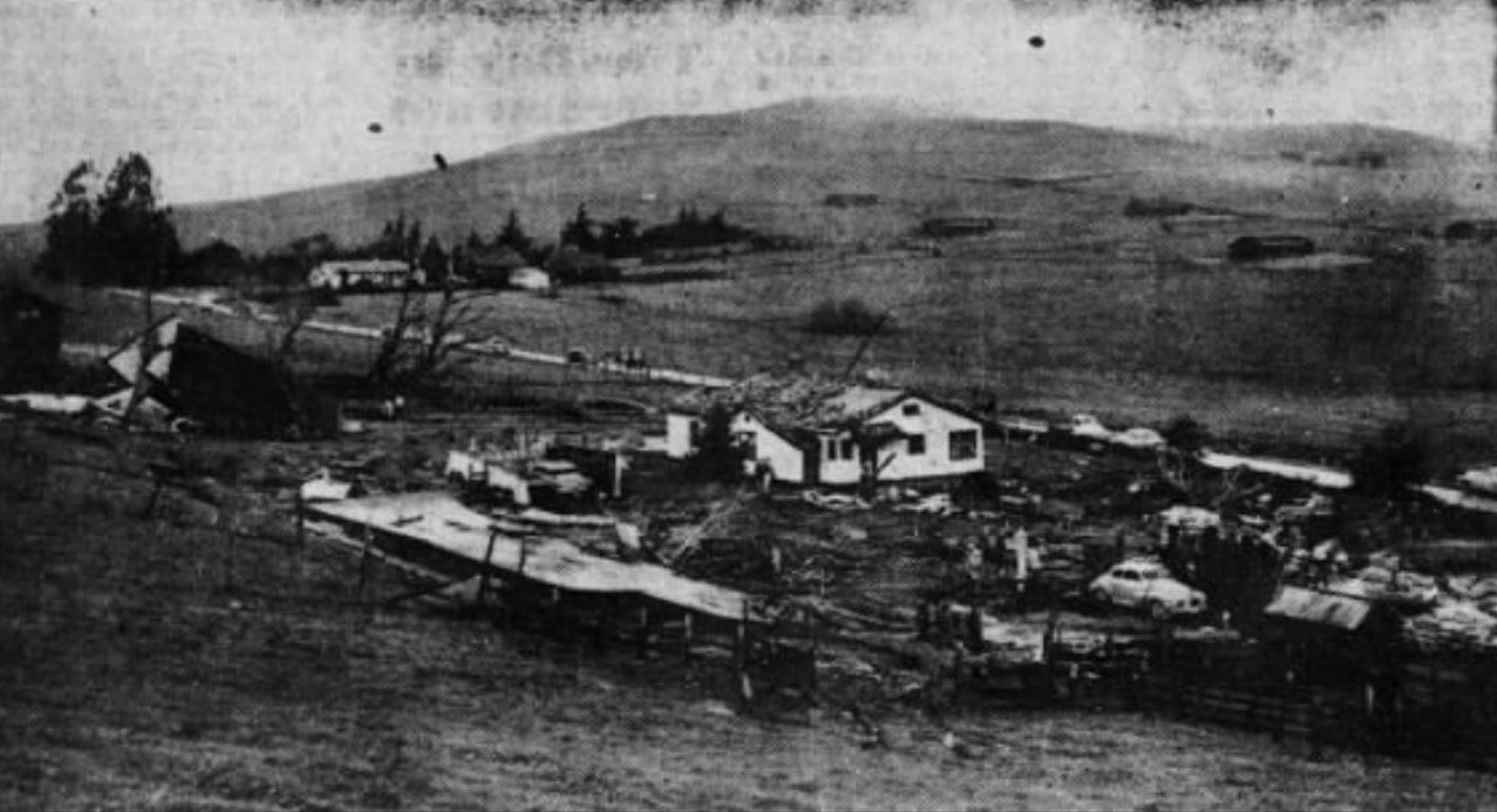
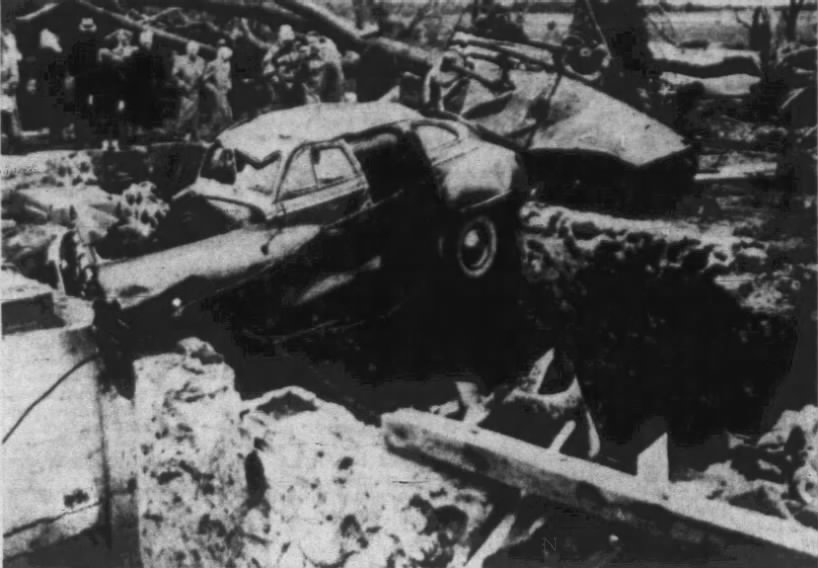
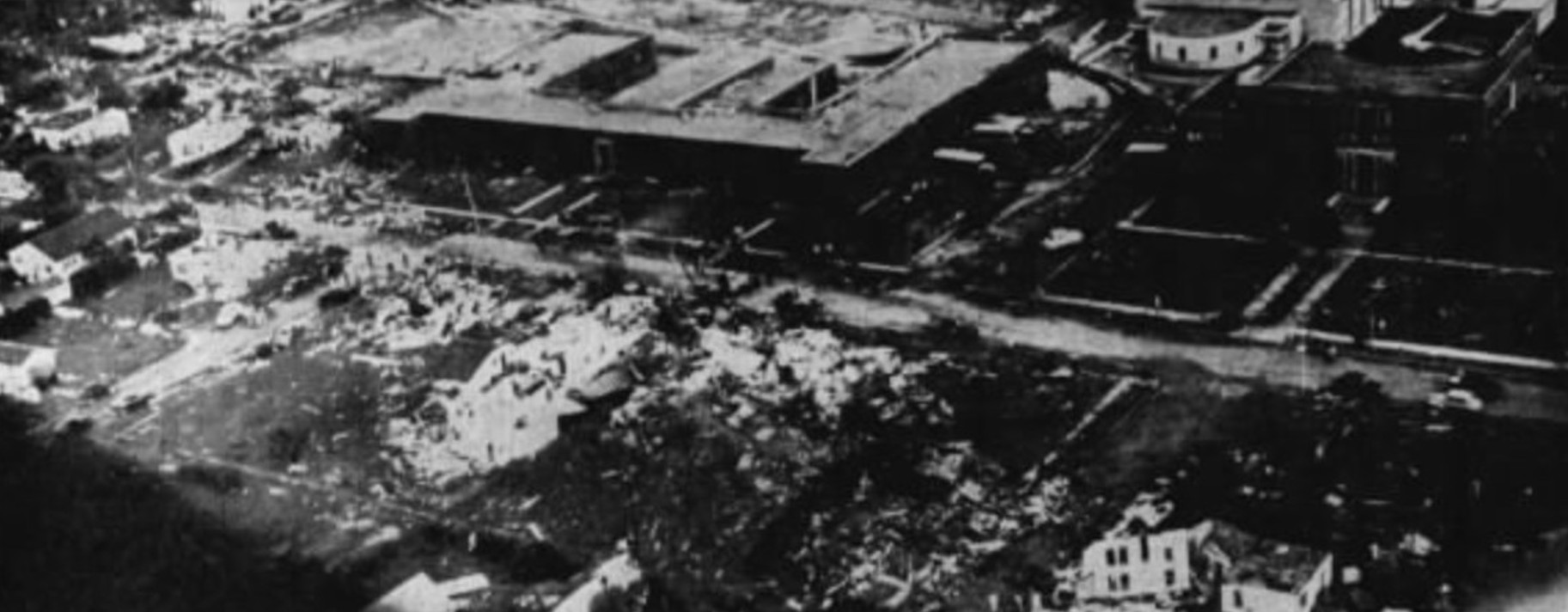
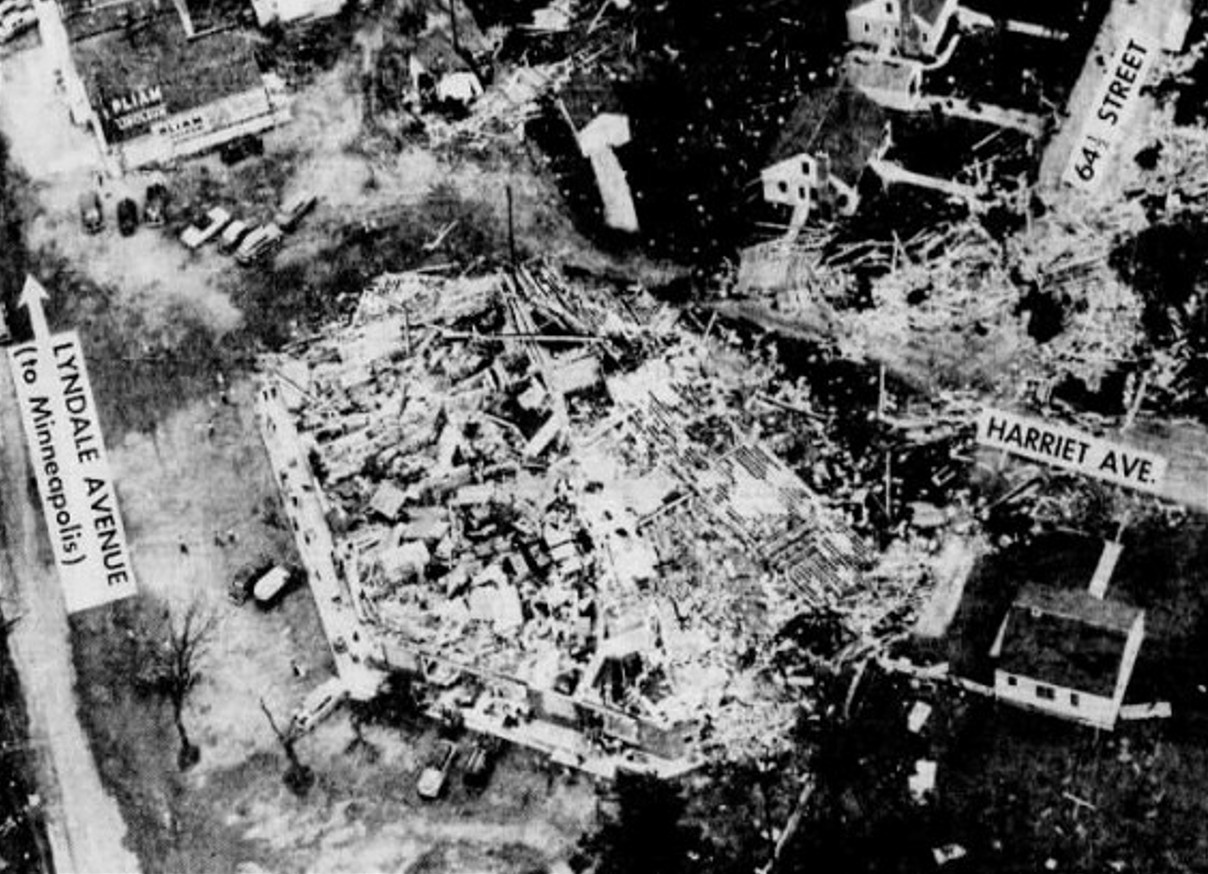
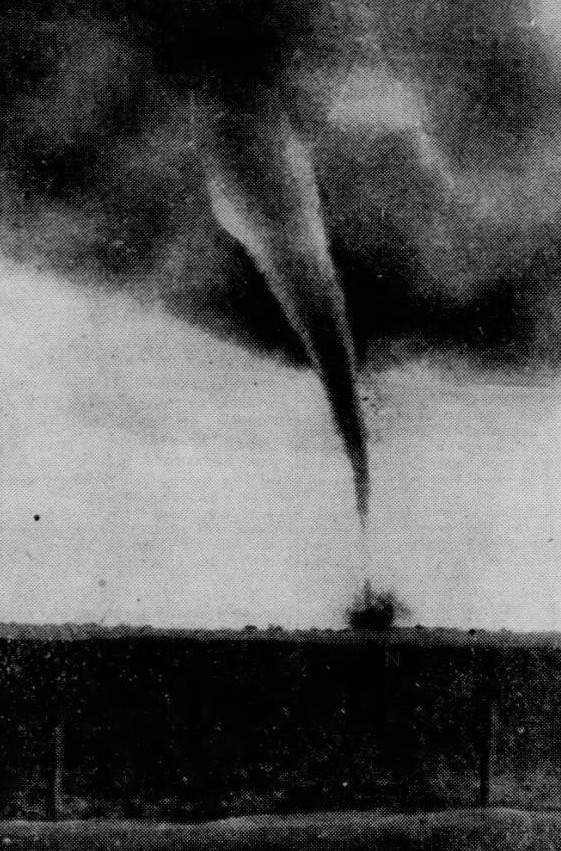
- Clockwise from top: An F3 tornado near Corn, Oklahoma on June 8; A barn after an F4 tornado near Waupaca, Wisconsin on September 26; Damage to stores in Minneapolis, Minnesota after an F3 tornado on July 20; A tall F2 tornado near Danvers, Illinois on November 13; Damage to downtown Olney, Texas after an F4 tornado on May 18; A ranch near Two Rock, California after an F2 tornado on January 11.
- Timespan: January 6 – December 20
- Maximum rated tornado: F4 tornado: Olney, Texas on May 18; Minneapolis, Minnesota on June 19; WaKeeney, Kansas on June 27; Cobb Town, Wisconsin on September 26; Cambria, Wisconsin on September 26
- Tornadoes in U.S.: 260
- Damage (U.S.): $65.506 million (1951 USD)
- Fatalities (U.S.): 34
- Fatalities (worldwide): >34

Fatal United States tornadoes in 1951
- Approximate touchdown location of killer tornadoes in 1951 Summary of tornadoes: February 20 – Mississippi (1 death); April 21 – Mississippi (2 deaths); May 18 – Texas (2 deaths); May 24 – Texas (1 death); May 25 – Kansas (1 death); May 26 – Florida (3 deaths); June 19 – Minnesota (1 death); June 23 – Kansas (1 death); June 23 – Kansas (1 death); June 27 – Kansas (5 deaths); June 27 – Illinois (1 death); July 20 – Minnesota (5 deaths); September 26 – Wisconsin (6 deaths); September 26 – Wisconsin (1 death); September 26 – Michigan (1 death); November 13 – Kentucky (1 death); December 6 – Illinois (1 death); Total fatalities: 34

This page documents the tornadoes and tornado outbreaks of 1951, primarily in the United States. Most tornadoes form in the U.S., although some events may take place internationally. Tornado statistics for older years like this often appear significantly lower than modern years due to fewer reports or confirmed tornadoes.

The total count of tornadoes and ratings differs from various agencies accordingly. The article, therefore, documents information from the most contemporary official sources alongside assessments from tornado historian Thomas P. Grazulis.

== Events ==
1951 was the second year where tornadoes were officially documented in the United States. The year saw 59 more tornadoes than the previous year, although they were more spread out time wise and more weak tornadoes were confirmed. The most active and deadliest month of the year was June with 76 tornadoes and nine fatalities.

=== United States yearly total ===
Confirmed tornadoes by Fujita rating
| FU | F0 | F1 | F2 | F3 | F4 | F5 | Total |
|---|---|---|---|---|---|---|---|
| 0 | 49 | 100 | 83 | 23 | 5 | 0 | 260 |

== January ==
There were 2 confirmed tornadoes in January.

=== January 6 ===
| FU | F0 | F1 | F2 | F3 | F4 | F5 |
|---|---|---|---|---|---|---|
| 0 | 0 | 0 | 0 | 1 | 0 | 0 |

An F3 tornado developed within a squall line and moved northward through the Alexandria, Louisiana metropolitan area causing severe damage in the towns of Sieps, Tioga, Simms, and Pollock, damaging stores, homes, and other buildings. Losses were estimated at $500,000 and 11 people were injured.

=== January 11 ===
| FU | F0 | F1 | F2 | F3 | F4 | F5 |
|---|---|---|---|---|---|---|
| 0 | 0 | 1 | 3 | 0 | 0 | 0 |

An outbreak of four tornadoes hit Northern California. The first was a waterspout that came ashore on Dillion Beach in Marin County becoming a tornado; it traveled to Two Rock in Sonoma County, the tornado severely damaged a ranch injuring 2 people and killing live stock, causing $18,000 in damage. The second was waterspout that was spotted by eyewitnesses as it came ashore on Richmond Annex hitting a lumber yard caring pieces of planks for a mile; 50 homes had minor damage; trees were damaged and glass was damaged from buildings and cars. The third tornado was an F2 that struck Los Gatos and Sunnyvale, carving a 880 yd (800 m) and severely damaged dozens of buildings. At least 250 homes were damaged, including 24 that lost their roofs or were torn from their foundations. 30 people were injured, and the tornado caused at least $1,500,000 in damage. This was the most destructive and intense tornado in California, and it was considered to be the "third most damaging tornado of the year". The final tornado was an F2 that struck San Jose which unroofed 25 homes, and damaged 100 more buildings downtown as well as some trees, a warehouse was completely destroyed and a man was injured. The tornado caused at least $50,000 in damage.

== February ==
There were 10 confirmed tornadoes in February.

=== February 19–20 ===
| FU | F0 | F1 | F2 | F3 | F4 | F5 |
|---|---|---|---|---|---|---|
| 0 | 1 | 1 | 4 | 1 | 0 | 0 |

A tornado outbreak struck areas from the Southern Plains to the Ohio Valley. On February 19, a long-track F2 tornado, or tornado family, tracked through parts of El Reno, Oklahoma, damaging or destroying a weather station, homes, stores, and other buildings, injuring five people. The next day, another F2 tornado tracked 112.8 mi (181.5 km) through Arkansas from Keo and Marked Tree, destroying several homes and farm buildings and injuring three. Meanwhile, a brief, but strong F3 tornado destroyed a farm home and outbuildings, killed one person and injured another near Westland Heights, Mississippi west of Starkville. Near Bankston, Alabama, an F2 tornado destroyed one building, and damaged 14 others, and caused considerable damage to telephone and power lines, injuring two. Overall, seven tornadoes touched down, injuring 11 and killing one.

== March ==
There were 6 confirmed tornadoes in March.

== April ==
There were 26 confirmed tornadoes in April.

=== April 20–21 ===
| FU | F0 | F1 | F2 | F3 | F4 | F5 |
|---|---|---|---|---|---|---|
| 0 | 3 | 1 | 1 | 1 | 0 | 0 |

An outbreak of six tornadoes struck the Great Plains and the Lower Mississippi Valley. Although most of the tornadoes were weak, a couple of strong tornadoes did touchdown and there were numerous casualties. On April 21, back-to-back F0 tornadoes in Louisiana injured two and one in rural La Salle and Ouchita Parishes respectively. The worst tornado was a long-tracked F3 tornado that touched down in Jones County, Mississippi, and moved north-northeastward, causing major damage in Lebanon halfway between Soso and Laurel. It then moved through rural areas into Jasper County before dissipating. Two people were killed and 16 others were injured. Overall, this outbreak killed two and injured 19.

=== April 30 ===
| FU | F0 | F1 | F2 | F3 | F4 | F5 |
|---|---|---|---|---|---|---|
| 0 | 1 | 2 | 1 | 2 | 0 | 0 |

Six destructive tornadoes hit Kansas, Nebraska, and Oklahoma. The first tornado of the outbreak was an early morning F3 tornado that hit Pratt, Kansas and areas west of Preston, tearing roofs off of homes, blowing out plate glass windows, and blowing down trees, light and telephone poles, and wires. That afternoon, another F3 tornado moved northeastward directly through Downtown Oklahoma City. It damaged over 1000 structures over path of about 100 blocks long, including extensive damage to commercial buildings and homes. However, despite the extensive damage, no casualties were reported from any of the tornadoes.

== May ==
There were 57 tornadoes confirmed in the US in May.

=== May 18–19 ===
| FU | F0 | F1 | F2 | F3 | F4 | F5 |
|---|---|---|---|---|---|---|
| 0 | 1 | 4 | 1 | 0 | 1 | 0 |

A small, but destructive outbreak of seven tornadoes struck Oklahoma and Texas. On May 18, a violent F4 tornado hit areas north of Olney, Texas. Many homes in town were destroyed, some of which were swept away with very little debris left. Tornado researcher Thomas P. Grazulis noted that the tornado may have reached F5 intensity as well. Two people were killed and 100 others were injured. All the other tornadoes struck Oklahoma, with no additional casualties.

=== May 24–26 ===
| FU | F0 | F1 | F2 | F3 | F4 | F5 |
|---|---|---|---|---|---|---|
| 0 | 0 | 5 | 1 | 1 | 0 | 0 |

Another series of deadly tornadoes struck areas from the Great Plains to the Southeast. On May 24, an F1 tornado destroyed a small house west of O'Brien, Texas. One person was killed, although this may have been due to lightning and not the tornado. The next day, an F3 tornado south of Clay Center, Kansas, destroyed farm buildings, damaged cars, and killed chickens on at least four farms. One person was killed, although they had a heart ailment, possibly making it only indirect. The deadliest tornado came on May 26, when an F1 tornado struck Carrabelle, Florida damaging buildings, boats, and commercial fishing equipment. Three fishermen drowned. Overall, the outbreak produced seven tornadoes and five fatalities.

== June ==
There were 76 tornadoes confirmed in the US in June.

=== June 8 ===
| FU | F0 | F1 | F2 | F3 | F4 | F5 |
|---|---|---|---|---|---|---|
| 0 | 0 | 4 | 2 | 1 | 0 | 0 |

One of the oldest videos of a tornado in the world, showing an F3 tornado near Corn, Oklahoma.

Several tornadoes touched down in Alabama, Kansas, Missouri, and Oklahoma. An F2 tornado near Plevna, Alabama north of New Market leveled a home resulting in two minor injuries while also destroying a granary and damaging other buildings. Another F2 tornado near Clinton Lake southwest of Lawrence in Douglas County, Kansas, removed the roof and destroyed the front and sides of a barn on a farm. The most notable event was a slow-moving, but large, destructive F3 tornado that struck Corn and Colony, Oklahoma, doing extensive damage to both towns. It destroyed 25 homes and 22 farm buildings, damaged 80 additional homes and buildings, and killed 26 heads of hogs and cattle and 1,650 chickens. Objects picked up by the tornado was carried as far as 90 miles (140 km) away. Ample warning prior to the storm striking the towns resulted in no casualties from this tornado. This tornado was the first in the United States to be caught on film and was also one of the most photographed tornadoes in Oklahoma at the time. Photographs showed that two tornadoes touched down, but only one is officially documented. Grazulis rated one of the tornadoes as an F4 while rating the other one F2, while noting that the latter may have been anticyclonic. Overall, seven tornadoes were confirmed.

=== June 13 ===
| FU | F0 | F1 | F2 | F3 | F4 | F5 |
|---|---|---|---|---|---|---|
| 0 | 0 | 1 | 1 | 0 | 0 | 0 |

An F2 tornado tore through the northwest side of Richmond, Virginia. It destroyed eight homes, a church, and 26 minor outbuildings; 120 other buildings had major damage while 264 other buildings suffered minor damage. 600 families were affected, trees were severely damaged and 12 people were injured. A destructive, but non-fatal F1 tornado also hit Surf City, North Carolina damaging buildings and vehicles.

=== June 19 ===
| FU | F0 | F1 | F2 | F3 | F4 | F5 |
|---|---|---|---|---|---|---|
| 0 | 1 | 2 | 1 | 0 | 1 | 0 |

An outbreak of five tornadoes struck the Midwest and Great Plains. The only tornado to cause casualties was a large, long-tracked F4 tornado family in Minnesota that caused major destruction in the western and northwestern Minneapolis suburbs, especially in the towns of Hutchinson, Medicine Lake, Brooklyn Center, and Anoka. It killed one and injured 20 on its 52.6-mile-path (84.7 km).

=== June 23 ===
| FU | F0 | F1 | F2 | F3 | F4 | F5 |
|---|---|---|---|---|---|---|
| 0 | 0 | 1 | 1 | 0 | 0 | 0 |

Two fatal tornadoes struck Kansas on June 23. The first tornado was an F1 tornado that hit areas just east of Rolla. It broke all the windows on north side of two churches, destroying the roof of a home, large grain bin, and small houses, fatally injuring an occupant. At the same time, an even stronger F2 tornado moved over the Hugoton Municipal Airport, destroying three hangars. It reportedly killed one person and injured five others, although the CDNS report does not list the fatality and one of the injuries may have been due to hail in Rolla. Overall, the two tornadoes killed two and injured five.

=== June 25–27 ===
| FU | F0 | F1 | F2 | F3 | F4 | F5 |
|---|---|---|---|---|---|---|
| 0 | 0 | 6 | 4 | 2 | 1 | 0 |

A deadly and destructive three-day outbreak sequence affected areas from Colorado to Pennsylvania. The worst day of the outbreak came on June 27, which is when most of the injuries and all of the fatalities occurred. The first, and deadliest, of the seven tornadoes that touched down that day was the only violent tornado of the outbreak. The F4 tornado ripped through a residential areas on the north side of WaKeeney, Kansas, killing five and injuring 100. With a path length of less than a mile, it was one of the shortest-lived F4 tornadoes on record. Later, the two F3 tornadoes of the outbreak struck Illinois. The first F3 tornado struck Heman, injuring 35. The second one moved through rural Logan County before striking the north side of Atlanta, killing one and injuring 15. Overall, 13 tornadoes touched down, killing six and injuring 161.

== July ==
There were 23 tornadoes confirmed in the US in July.

=== July 20 ===
| FU | F0 | F1 | F2 | F3 | F4 | F5 |
|---|---|---|---|---|---|---|
| 0 | 0 | 0 | 1 | 1 | 0 | 0 |

Two strong, destructive tornadoes caused casualties on July 20. The first tornado, which was rated F2 and was accompanied by damaging straight-line winds and heavy rain, struck the southeast side of Watertown, South Dakota while also passing near Kranzburg and Goodwin, South Dakota, damaging four trailers, destroying a small home and several barns, and injuring four. (The NCEI point is incorrectly placed in Minnesota, and the CDNS report only lists this tornado in their annual report and does not include any casualties.) Later, an F3 tornado caused major damage in the southwestern Minneapolis, Minnesota suburbs of Minnetonka, Edina, and Richfield. At the Wold–Chamberlain Field, it destroyed about 63 airplanes and damaged about 37 others. Several W.M.L. hangars, military barracks, and other buildings were destroyed or severely damaged. Several homes were completely destroyed, other properties were extensively damaged, and power and communication lines were severely affected. Hundreds of trees were blown down, with some landing on roofs and vehicles. Deemed the most damaging tornado on record in Minnesota, it killed five people and injured 40 others. Tornado researcher Thomas P. Grazulis stated that this event was probably a “complex combination of tornadoes and microbursts”, that deaths may not have been directly due to tornadoes, and that most of the damage was due to microburst. Overall, the two tornadoes caused five deaths and 44 injuries.

== August ==
There were 27 tornadoes confirmed in the US in August.

=== August 17 (Soviet Union) ===
A strong, multi-vortex tornado accompanied by heavy rain and hail swept through the Khimki district of the Soviet Union. The worst damage was in the village of Skhodnya, where a wooden railway platform was overturned.

=== August 20–21 ===
| FU | F0 | F1 | F2 | F3 | F4 | F5 |
|---|---|---|---|---|---|---|
| 0 | 0 | 0 | 4 | 1 | 0 | 0 |

A series of strong tornadoes struck New England. On August 21, a long-tracked F2 tornado family (which may have been a group of tornadoes from separate storms) moved through several towns west and near Hartford, Connecticut, injuring nine people. (the CDNS report indicates only one injury) The strongest tornado was an F3 tornado in East Hampton, Connecticut that injured eight when it tore the roof off a fishnet factory. Overall, the five tornadoes injured 17.

== September ==
There were 9 tornadoes confirmed in the US in September.

=== September 26 ===
| FU | F0 | F1 | F2 | F3 | F4 | F5 |
|---|---|---|---|---|---|---|
| 0 | 0 | 0 | 1 | 0 | 2 | 0 |

Two violent and deadly F4 tornadoes struck Wisconsin. The first one hit Cobb Town and Southern Manawa, killing six and injuring three. The second one moved through rural Columbia County before striking areas south of Cambria, killing one and injuring nine. Additionally, a fatal F2 tornado moved through the Huron–Manistee National Forests north of Bitely, Michigan, killing one and injuring three. Overall, the three tornadoes caused eight deaths and 15 injuries.

== October ==
There were 2 tornadoes confirmed in the US in October.

== November ==
There were 12 tornadoes confirmed in the US in November.

=== November 13–16 ===
| FU | F0 | F1 | F2 | F3 | F4 | F5 |
|---|---|---|---|---|---|---|
| 0 | 0 | 1 | 7 | 2 | 0 | 0 |

An outbreak of mostly strong tornadoes struck areas from the Upper Mississippi Valley to the Southeast. On November 13, an F3 tornado struck Como, Missouri, completely destroying a home and a barn while ripping the roof of another home. One man was injured when his leg was broken in the leveled home. An F2 tornado then struck Campbell Hill, Illinois, destroying 10 homes and the city hall, causing additional damage in the business district, and injuring seven. (the CDNS report lists six injuries) This was followed by a short-lived, but strong F2 tornado that caused considerable damage to buildings, trees and other structures in the Gary, Indiana suburb of Glen Park. The worst tornado then occurred in Kentucky, where an F3 tornado struck Gilbertsville, destroying 12 buildings, killing horses and cows, and ruining tobacco in barns. One person was killed when a tree fell on their home and 11 others were injured. Between November 15–16, three F2 tornadoes caused injuries in Alabama. On November 15, the first of these three tornadoes struck Walter, destroying two homes and a barn while damaging another home, injuring two. The second tornado struck near Oakland, destroying several barns, a ballpark, and a home–which was blown 175 ft (53 m)–while also damaging other smaller buildings. Six people were injured. Early on November 16, the third tornado heavily damaged or destroyed three homes near Blountsville, injuring one person. Overall, 10 tornadoes touched down, killing one and injuring 28.

== December ==
There were 10 tornadoes confirmed in the US in December.

=== December 6 ===
| FU | F0 | F1 | F2 | F3 | F4 | F5 |
|---|---|---|---|---|---|---|
| 0 | 0 | 1 | 0 | 1 | 0 | 0 |

A brief, weak F1 tornado touched down south-southwest of Junction City, Oregon near Eugene. It lifted and destroyed a 30 by 32 feet (9.1 by 9.8 m) machine shed, spreading debris along its path. There were no casualties from this tornado. Hundreds of miles away in Illinois, an F3 tornado moved through Spring Valley, demolishing a railroad depot. One man was killed by falling debris while one other person was injured. The tornado then tracked through mostly rural areas before dissipating.

== See also ==
- Tornado
  - Tornadoes by year
  - Tornado records
  - Tornado climatology
  - Tornado myths
- List of tornado outbreaks
  - List of F5 and EF5 tornadoes
  - List of North American tornadoes and tornado outbreaks
  - List of 21st-century Canadian tornadoes and tornado outbreaks
  - List of European tornadoes and tornado outbreaks
  - List of tornadoes and tornado outbreaks in Asia
  - List of Southern Hemisphere tornadoes and tornado outbreaks
  - List of tornadoes striking downtown areas
  - List of tornadoes with confirmed satellite tornadoes
- Tornado intensity
  - Fujita scale
  - Enhanced Fujita scale
