= List of F4 tornadoes (1950–1959) =

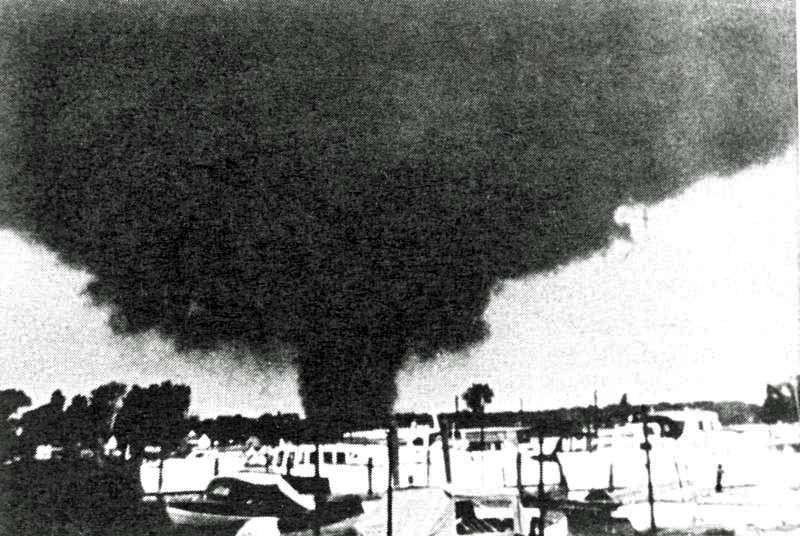
An F4 tornado near Erie, Michigan on June 8, 1953. Photo courtesy of NOAA.

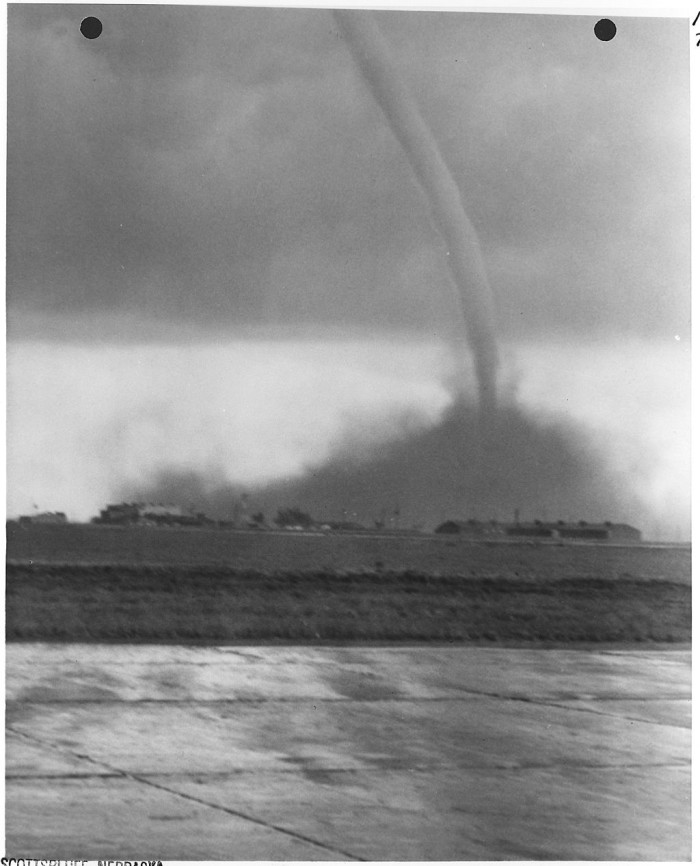
The F4 Scottsbluff, Nebraska tornado passing the Scottsbluff airport on June 27, 1955.

This is a list of tornadoes which have been officially or unofficially labeled as F4, EF4, IF4, or an equivalent rating in the 1950s. These scales – the Fujita scale, the Enhanced Fujita scale, the International Fujita scale, and the TORRO tornado intensity scale – attempt to estimate the intensity of a tornado by classifying the damage caused to natural features and man-made structures in the tornado's path.

Tornadoes are among the most violent known meteorological phenomena. Each year, more than 2,000 tornadoes are recorded worldwide, with the vast majority occurring in North America and Europe. To assess the intensity of these events, meteorologist Ted Fujita devised a method to estimate maximum wind speeds within tornadic storms based on the damage caused; this became known as the Fujita scale. The scale ranks tornadoes from F0 to F5, with F0 being the least intense and F5 being the most intense. F4 tornadoes were estimated to have had maximum winds between 207 mph (333 km/h) and 260 mph (420 km/h). (Note: The winds estimated by the Fujita Scale are estimated values and have not been verified scientifically.)

Following two particularly devastating tornadoes in 1997 and 1999, engineers questioned the reliability of the Fujita scale. Ultimately, a new scale was devised that took into account 28 different damage indicators; this became known as the Enhanced Fujita scale. With building design and structural integrity taken more into account, winds in an EF4 tornado were estimated to between 166 mph (267 km/h) and 200 mph (320 km/h). The Enhanced Fujita scale is used predominantly in North America. Most of Europe, on the other hand, uses the TORRO tornado intensity scale (or T-Scale), which ranks tornado intensity between T0 and T11; F4/EF4 tornadoes are approximately equivalent to T8 to T9 on the T-Scale. Tornadoes rated IF4 on the International Fujita scale are also included on this list.

== List ==
Tornadoes officially rated F4/EF4 or equivalent
Day	Year	Country	Subdivision	Location	Fatalities	Notes	Rated by
February 12	1950	United States	Louisiana	Shreveport, Barksdale Air Force Base	8 (20 Injuries)	Tornado outbreak of February 11–13, 1950 – This long-tracked tornado damaged, destroyed, or leveled numerous homes along a path of 20 or so miles and 100 yards wide.	NWS
April 28	1950	United States	Texas	Clyde	5 (5 Injuries)	Tornado outbreak of April 28–29, 1950 – This tornado moved on the north side of Clyde, obliterating everything in its path despite being short-lived. A total of 21 homes was destroyed or damaged, including 2 homes where nothing remained with debris scattered for more of a mile. A refrigerator was thrown 1/2 mi before lodging itself atop a telephone pole.	NWS
April 28	1950	United States	Oklahoma	Holdenville	5 (32 Injuries)	Tornado outbreak of April 28–29, 1950 – This tornado began 2 mi (3.2 km) southwest of Holdenville at 7:05 pm CST and moved northeastward directly through the city. It cut a swath of destruction six blocks wide and 18 blocks long in the northwest section of Holdenville. A total of 38 homes were destroyed while 188 other homes were damaged. After exiting Holdenville, the tornado turned to the north and dissipated 1 mi (1.6 km) north of town. There were 32 injuries and $250,000 in damage. The NWS Norman puts the property losses in Holdenville at $500,000. Two of the dead were found 150 yd (140 m) from their homesite.	NWS
May 4	1950	United States	Kansas	Zook, Dundee	0 (1 Injuries)	A long-tracked tornado struck Zook, Kansas before tracking over open country and hitting Dundee and the Great Bend Municipal Airport outside of Great Bend, Kansas. This tornado destroyed 11 homes in Zook with near-F5 damage recorded at two homes while also striking another housing development northwest of Great Bend. One person was injured by this tornado.	NWS
June 8	1950	United States	Kansas	McPherson	1 (5 Injuries)	This large tornado formed within a squall line and hit the south side of McPherson, Kansas, destroying buildings, trees, and power lines.	NWS
June 25	1950	United States	Wisconsin	Colby, Crescent Lake, Rhinelander	3 (12 Injuries)	This half-mile wide tornado leveled vacation homes in Crescent Lake before moving in to Rhinelander damaging 12 more homes. Two people drowned when the tornado overturned their boat 12 others was injured.	NWS
July 15	1950	United States	Nebraska	Uehling	0 (33 Injuries)	The tornado struck areas north of Uehling, Nebraska, destroying farm buildings, farm houses, and a schoolhouse.	NWS
May 18	1951	United States	Texas	Olney	2 (100 Injuries)	The tornado struck areas north of Olney. Many homes in town were destroyed, some of which were swept away with very little debris left. Tornado researcher Thomas P. Grazulis noted that the tornado may have reached F5 intensity as well.	NWS
June 19	1951	United States	Minnesota	Hamel, Northern Minneapolis, Minnesota	1 (20 Injuries)	Tornado outbreak of June 19, 1951 – A large tornado, which was likely a tornado family, moved through the western and northern suburbs of Minneapolis. The worst damage occurred near Hamel, where homes, a garage, and several other structures were heavily damaged or destroyed. One home along MN 55 was thrown 200 yd (180 m) and leveled, with all three occupants being injured. One of them, an elderly woman who was seriously injured, later died at the hospital.	NWS
June 27	1951	United States	Kansas	WaKeeney	5 (100 Injuries)	Tornado outbreak sequence of June 25–27, 1951 – The roar of this tornado was heard just prior to it moving directly through WaKeeney shortly after midnight, causing catastrophic damage despite only being on the ground for about a mile. A total of 45 homes were destroyed while 60 others were damaged. 100 people were injured and damage was estimated at $2.5 million.	NWS
September 26	1951	United States	Wisconsin	Cobb Town, Manawa	6 (3 Injures)	Great Lakes tornadoes of September 26, 1951 – Several farm buildings were heavily damaged or destroyed with the greatest damage occurring just past Cobb Town, about 3 miles (4.8 km) north of Waupaca. There, three farms were obliterated and swept away at near-F5 intensity. Five of the six people killed came from one family. who were killed as they were cleaning chickens on the porch the opposite side of the house from the approaching tornado. The other fatality occurred in the Lebanon Township near Sugar Bush where a 40-year-old woman was killed in a flattened home. Three people were injured and losses totaled $500,000 in damage.	NWS
September 26	1951	United States	Wisconsin	Cambria	1 (9 Injuries)	Great Lakes tornadoes of September 26, 1951 – This tornado struck a farm. There, a large house and every farm building was obliterated, including the house of the hired hand who was killed with debris from the home being left in a pile 300 feet (91 m) from the foundation. Hundreds of trees were stripped and/or uprooted, including some that were 18 inches (46 cm) in diameter, and chickens were defeathered. Nine people were injured and losses total $250,000. This tornado was rated F3 by Grazulis.	NWS
February 13	1952	United States	Tennessee	Marble Hill, Beech Hill, Marble Plains, Decherd	3 (44 Injuries)	Tornado outbreak of February 13, 1952 – This tornado moved through southern Moore County and northwestern Franklin County, producing heavy to catastrophic damage along almost the entire path. There was damage reported on 109 farms, and hundreds of buildings, including homes, schools, churches, stores, and other structures, were heavily damaged or destroyed. Heavy destructions was observed at Marble Hill, four buildings were completely destroyed in Beech Hill, two fatalities occurred in Marble Plains when a home was swept away, and a third fatality and heavy damage was confirmed in Decherd. Five freight cars on the N. C. & St. L. Railroad were also derailed in Decherd and scattered along the right of way in the town.	NWS
February 29	1952	United States	Tennessee	Fayetteville	2 (150 Injuries)	Tornado outbreak of Leap Day 1952 – Of the 1,828 buildings in Fayetteville, 932 were damaged or destroyed. In all, 139 homes were destroyed, 152 had major damage, and another 164 sustained minor damage. An additional 23 farm buildings were destroyed, 15 others had major damage, and 11 more had minor damage. 105 businesses were destroyed, while 58 others had major damage; 37 more sustained minor damage, and nine additional ones had superficial damage. Damage to six churches alone in downtown Fayetteville were estimated at $300,000. Several business houses were destroyed, power and communications lines were damaged over a large area; and hundreds of huge shade trees were uprooted. Grazulis gave the tornado an F3 rating.	NWS
March 21	1952	United States	Arkansas	Dierks	7 (9 Injuries)	Tornado outbreak of March 21–22, 1952 – This violent tornado, the first member of a long-lived tornado family, destroyed 22 homes on the outskirts of Dierks, most of which were frail, and killed livestock and poultry. Many homes southwest of town were flattened, sustaining F4 damage, and trees were stripped of their bark. Nine people were injured.	NWS
March 21	1952	United States	Arkansas	Kensett, Judsonia, Bald Knob	50 (325 Injuries)	Tornado outbreak of March 21–22, 1952 – The tornado reached a peak width of 1 1/2 mi (2.4 km) wide and caused major damage along its path. The worst damage was in Judsonia; the tornado moved right through the center of the town, which was essentially leveled. The business district of the town was obliterated, 385 homes were destroyed, and 560 others were damaged. There were 30 deaths in the town alone. Considerable damage and 20 other fatalities occurred elsewhere as well.	NWS
March 21	1952	United States	Arkansas	Lonoke County	2 (6 Injuries)	Tornado outbreak of March 21–22, 1952 – Major destruction occurred near the rural community of Wattensaw.	NWS
March 21	1952	United States	Arkansas	Cotton Plant	29 (180 Injuries)	Tornado outbreak of March 21–22, 1952 – The tornado obliterated the northwest side of Cotton Plant, where all the fatalities occurred.	NWS
March 21	1952	United States	Tennessee	RoEllen	2 (10 Injuries)	Tornado outbreak of March 21–22, 1952 – This tornado damaged or destroyed a total of 17 homes near RoEllen. Grazulis classified the tornado as an F3.	NWS
March 21	1952	United States	Arkansas	Hickory Ridge	4 (5 Injuries)	Tornado outbreak of March 21–22, 1952 – According to Grazulis, this may have actually been a continuation of the F4 tornado that passed near Wattensaw.	NWS
March 21	1952	United States	Missouri	Cooter	17 (100 Injuries)	Tornado outbreak of March 21–22, 1952 – This tornado was up to 1.4 mi (2.3 km) wide at times. It damaged or destroyed up to 200 homes, many of which were small tenant homes. Grazulis assessed the tornado as having traversed the Mississippi River into Tennessee.	NWS
March 21	1952	United States	Tennessee	Newbern	4 (5 Injuries)	Tornado outbreak of March 21–22, 1952 – This was one of several tornadoes to strike the Dyersburg area. Grazulis assessed the tornado as an F3.	NWS
March 21	1952	United States	Mississippi, Tennessee	Byhalia (MS), Moscow (TN)	16 (74 Injuries)	Tornado outbreak of March 21–22, 1952 – This tornado may have merged with a second, undocumented tornado upon touching down. Along the path, 38 homes were destroyed. This tornado was previously rated F5 based on the destruction of a concrete block structure, but was downgraded to F4 after a study showed that the structure was probably not steel-reinforced.	NWS
March 21	1952	United States	Tennessee	Bolivar, Henderson	38 (157 Injuries)	Tornado outbreak of March 21–22, 1952 – The tornado may have been a continuation of the above tornado. Four people were killed on the north side of Bolivar, where 14 homes were destroyed, while 23 more people were killed on the north side of Henderson, which was leveled. In all, the tornado damaged or destroyed 600 homes.	NWS
March 22	1952	United States	Alabama	Massey, Hartselle	4 (50 Injuries)	Tornado outbreak of March 21–22, 1952 – The tornado damaged or destroyed 84 structures, including 35 homes. Some homes in Massey and Plainville were leveled.	NWS
April 21	1952	United States	Texas	McLennan County	0	A small home on a farm was swept completely from its foundation, with all six occupants of the home running out of the house and laying flat in a field, escaping the tornado without any injuries. Elsewhere along the path, the tornado heavily damaged two automobiles, one of which was a pickup truck that was thrown 200 ft (61 m), and destroyed several farm buildings, including small homes on three more farms.	NWS
May 22	1952	United States	Kansas	Lawrence, Linwood, Edwardsville	0 (3 Injuries)	Tornado outbreak of May 21–24, 1952 – The towns of Linwood and Edwardsville were particularly hard hit, as dozens of homes were destroyed, including the home of a bank president that was leveled. Grazulis indicated that the tornado may have reached F5 intensity as well.	NWS
June 24	1952	United States	Iowa	Cleghorn, Larrabee	0 (4 Injuries)	Tornado outbreak of June 23–24, 1952 – This tornado struck 53 farmsteads, 13 of which were completely demolished and 34 that suffered major damage.	NWS
July 1	1952	United States	North Dakota	Tuttle	1 (26 Injuries)	The worst damage from this long-tracked tornado occurred in Tuttle. Entire farms were demolished and Tuttle sustained considerable damage. Eight homes and more than 175 other buildings were destroyed while 200 other homes and over 600 other buildings were damaged. A man was killed before he could take refuge in the basement of his home which was carried away.	NWS
August 13	1952	United States	Nebraska	Wahoo, Memphis, Ashland	0 (20 Injuries)	Buildings were destroyed on 15 farms, including two where all the buildings, along with the homes, were leveled.	NWS
March 13	1953	United States	Texas	Jud, O'Brien, Knox City	17 (25 Injuries)	Tornado outbreak of March 12–15, 1953 – The tornado destroyed 33 homes, damaged 139 others, and destroyed 43 other buildings. Many rural homes were swept away and an eight-block area in Knox City was leveled.	NWS
April 28	1953	United States	Texas	Wetmore	2 (15 Injuries)	Tornado outbreak sequence of April 28 – May 2, 1953 – One home was completely obliterated and a vehicle was carried 200 yd (180 m). A woman was killed and five other members of her family were injured when their home "exploded". The actual tornado casualty count may have been one death and five injuries, which was listed under an F3 tornado that struck Helotes, Texas prior to this.	NWS
April 30	1953	United States	Georgia	Warner Robins, Robins Air Force Base	18 (300 Injuries)	Tornado outbreak sequence of April 28 – May 2, 1953 – This tornado struck a large housing project on the south side of Warner Robins. It destroyed 275 apartment units, 65 homes, and 25 trailers while heavily damaging 84 other apartment units, and 135 other homes. Debris was hurled high into the air and scattered a 1/2 mi (0.80 km) or more away from the path of the tornado. The high death and injury toll was mainly caused by this as people were hit by flying bricks and other debris. Grazulis list this as a long-tracked tornado that started south of Fort Valley and struck Dry Branch and Jeffersonville, but official records list this as four separate tornado events.	NWS
May 1	1953	United States	Alabama	Millerville, Ashland	7 (12 Injuries)	Tornado outbreak sequence of April 28 – May 2, 1953 – This tornado obliterated a frame home near its touchdown point, killing the two women inside, with one of the bodies being thrown over 100 yd (91 m). Another home was obliterated at Haskins Crossroads, while several more homes were destroyed south of Ashland. Two people were critically injured in one the homes before dying at the hospital two hours later while another house containing seven people was leveled, killing three people and critically injuring the four others. Much of its path was along or parallel to SR 9.	NWS
May 1	1953	United States	Alabama	Yantley	2 (3 Injuries)	Tornado outbreak sequence of April 28 – May 2, 1953 – This tornado destroyed three homes, including one home that obliterated with its cookstove found 1/4 mi (0.40 km) away. Other debris was scattered up to 1/2 mi (0.80 km) away as well and 35 ft (11 m) of curbing was removed.	NWS
May 2	1953	United States	Tennessee	Idlewild, Niota	4 (8 Injuries)	Tornado outbreak sequence of April 28 – May 2, 1953 – This tornado developed within a squall line just east of Decatur. It hit 205 structures; three homes and 55 farm buildings were destroyed, including a well built two-story home that was obliterated with debris scattered up to 1/2 mi (0.80 km) away, and 58 other homes and 89 farm buildings were damaged as well. According to Grazulis, the fourth death may have been unrelated to the tornado when a plane crashed because of the storm.	NWS
May 10	1953	United States	Iowa	Wayne County, Lucas County	0	1953 Waco tornado outbreak – This tornado leveled a farm house at low-end F4 intensity between Millerton and Russell. Debris from the home was scattered a short distance away from the foundation.	NWS
May 10	1953	United States	Iowa	Hancock County, Cerro Gordo County, Worth County	0 (3 Injuries)	1953 Waco tornado outbreak – A long-tracked tornado damaged or destroyed about 30 homes and 200 other farm structures on farms. One farm lost all its buildings, with only the main house left standing. Of the three injuries, two were critical, both to an elderly couple near Ventura.	NWS
May 10	1953	United States	Iowa, Minnesota, Wisconsin	Catawba (WS)	2 (24 Injuries)	1953 Waco tornado outbreak – This event is officially as one long-tracked tornado, but was more likely a tornado family that contained at least five distinct tornadoes according to Grazulis. Part of the track may have also been from a separate supercell. Grazulis stated that the F4 damage occurred in Wisconsin towards the end of its path southeast of Catawaba; he rated the maximum damage in the other two states F3. A farmhouse was swept from its foundation, and fragments of the home were lofted for 7 miles (11 km). Near-F4 damage was also inflicted to two homes near Strum according to Grazulis.	NWS
May 11	1953	United States	Texas	San Angelo	13 (159 Injuries)	1953 Waco tornado outbreak – This tornado, which was likely spawned by an outflow boundary, moved east-southeast through the north side of San Angelo, producing near-F5 damage at times according to Grazulis. 519 homes, 19 businesses and 150 cars were damaged or destroyed along the northern third of the city. A two-story school lost its roof and many walls; students in the school sheltered safely in interior hallways, and only 12 were injured, none critically.	NWS
May 21	1953	United States, Canada	Michigan, Ontario	Port Huron (MI), Sarnia (ON), Nairn (ON)	2 (68 Injuries)	1953 Sarnia tornado – This large tornado began near Smiths Creek, Michigan and struck Porth Huron, devastating a large section of the town as it produced widespread F3 to F4 damage. 300 homes were damaged and 90 more were destroyed. The tornado strengthened some more as it crossed the St. Clair River and moved into Canada just south of Sarnia Harbour, striking Sarnia directly damaging almost 100 commercial buildings. At least 150 homes on the more suburban outskirts of the city were damaged, including some that were destroyed and leveled. The tornado weakened after that, but one more area of F4 damage was inflicted upon farmsteads and homes near Nairn before it dissipated south of Stratford. The tornado's total path length based on official information is suggested to be exceeding 120 km (75 mi), though it is highly probable that this damage path was made up of more than one tornado, possibly as many as four, after the tornado left Sarnia.	NWS, EC
June 7	1953	United States	Nebraska	Arcadia	11	Flint–Worcester tornado outbreak sequence – Homes were leveled, two cars were destroyed, and farm machinery was tossed. F4 damage occurred to one home in the Hays Creek area and three more near Arcadia. A farm near Arcadia was obliterated and swept completely away, killing 10 people at a family reunion. Bodies were thrown up to .5 mi (0.80 km) away from the residence. The other death occurred elsewhere along the path.	NWS
June 8	1953	United States	Michigan	Bedford Township, Erie Township	4 (18 Injuries)	Flint–Worcester tornado outbreak sequence – This stovepipe tornado threw trucks and cars off of U.S. 24, destroyed 15 homes, and damaged 14 others. A six-ton truck was thrown 80 ft (24 m) and three cars were observed in the air at one point as well. The tornado then transitioned into a waterspout that tracked for an additional 30 miles (48 km) in 44 minutes over Lake Erie, one of the longest such tracks ever recorded. A motorist who sought shelter in a ditch was killed while the other three fatalities occurred in a home that was destroyed.	NWS
June 8	1953	United States	Ohio	Cygnet	17 (379 Injured)	Flint–Worcester tornado outbreak sequence – This long-tracked tornado was more than likely a tornado family of at least three tornadoes according to Grazulis. The tornado moved out onto Lake Erie on the west side of Cleveland at the end of its life. Many buildings and crops were heavily damaged or destroyed and cattle was killed or injured. The peak damage occurred near Cygnet, where a woman and four children died in their home. The tornado is noted by Grazulis to have possibly reached F5 intensity in the town as well.	NWS
June 8	1953	United States	Michigan	Yale	0 (23 Injuries)	Flint–Worcester tornado outbreak sequence – This tornado came from the same storm that produced the Flint F5 tornado. Two homes and many barns were obliterated. Grazulis listed the casualty count as one death and 34 injuries.	NWS
June 9	1953	United States	Massachusetts	Rutland, Holden, Worcester, Shrewsbury, Westborough, Soutborough	94 (1,228 Injuries)	1953 Worcester tornado – This large, long-tracked, deadly, and destructive tornado, which was 1 mi-wide (1.6 km) at times, damaged or destroyed 4,000 buildings. The most intense damage occurred in Rutland, Holden, Worcester, Shrewsbury and Westborough. Entire neighborhoods was obliterated and swept away with the debris granulated and scattered well away from the foundations of the homes. The main building of Assumption College (building is now home to Quinsigamond Community College), which had 3-foot-thick (0.91 m) brick walls, was reduced by three floors. The landmark tower at the school also lost three stories. A nearby storage tank, weighing several tons, was lofted and tossed across a road. Hundreds of vehicles were thrown, including a 12-tonne (12,000 kg) bus that was picked up, rolled over several times, and thrown against a newly constructed apartment building, killing two passengers. Debris from the tornado was strewn eastward, reaching the Blue Hill Meteorological Observatory 35 mi (56 km) away, and even out over Massachusetts Bay and the Atlantic Ocean. One item was documented to have been blown from Holden to Eastham on Cape Cod, a distance of 110 miles (180 km), one of the greatest such instances in a U.S. tornado. The tornado caused the 4th (then-3rd) most injuries of any tornado in U.S. history and left 10,000 people homeless. Many experts, including Grazulis, suspect that this tornado probably reached F5 intensity at some point in it life. Although, it was on the ground for 85 minutes, the tornado never received a formal tornado warning until it was in the process of dissipating at the end of its life, although a separate F3 tornado did form after the tornado dissipated. 1953 was the first year that tornado and severe thunderstorm warnings were used, but the National Weather Service office in Boston feared that mentioning the possibility for tornado activity for the area that day would cause panic among local citizens and only issued a severe thunderstorm watch, the first one ever issued in Massachusetts. As a result, most residents received little to no warning about the tornado approaching their area. The tornado was also the principal catalyst for the Storm Prediction Center's reorganization on June 17, 1953, and subsequent implementation of a nationwide radar/storm spotter system.	NWS
December 3	1953	United States	Louisiana	Leander	9 (50 Injuries)	Tornado outbreak sequence of December 1–6, 1953 – A long-tracked tornado, which may have been a tornado family, damage or destroyed many homes and other structures. The most severe damage according to Grazulis occurred in Leander, where four homes were destroyed. Heavy damage also occurred in Alexandria, Ball, Dry Prong, Georgetown, and Tullos. Grazulis listed the event as three separate tornado events from different storms rather than the same storm with the F4 tornado being the last of three; he rated the other two tornadoes F2.	NWS
March 25	1954	United States	Missouri	Texas County	2	This tornado damaged or destroyed buildings on 20 farms northwest of Houston. A frame house was obliterated with debris scattered up to 2 miles (3.2 km) away. The two occupants, an elderly woman and her son, were thrown 150 yards (140 m) and killed. A truck was also destroyed and trees were downed as well.	NWS
April 5	1954	United States	Missouri, Iowa	Westboro (MO), Northboro (IA)	0 (2 Injuries)	This tornado was noted as being a "twin-funneled" event. It damaged or destroyed 11 homes and 65 outbuildings, threw a pickup truck 300 yards (270 m), removed 2 inches (5.1 cm) of topsoil, and uprooted trees and crops. Two people were injured in Missouri. Grazulis rated the tornado F3, but said near-F4 damage occurred along the path.	NWS
April 30	1954	United States	Iowa	La Fayette, Alburnett	0	The tornado was listed by Grazulis as a family of at least five tornadoes.	NWS
May 1	1954	United States	Texas, Oklahoma	Vernon (TX)	0 (2 Injuries)	The peak damage from this tornado occurred in Texas; Grazulis rated the damage in Oklahoma F2-F3. Grazulis also noted that the tornado may have reached F5 intensity as well.	NWS
May 1	1954	United States	Oklahoma	Meeker, Sparks, Davenport	0 (65 Injuries)	The beginning of the tornado's path was not listed by Grazulis, the CDNS report, and the NWS Norman, indicating that the starting point of this tornado was in Pottawatomie County instead of Oklahoma County.	NWS
May 30	1954	United States	Nebraska	Norfolk	6 (23 Injuries)	There was damage to 30 farms, including three that were completely leveled, which is where all the deaths occurred. Some of the bodies were thrown into trees.	NWS
June 9	1954	United States	Iowa	Calhoun County	1	This tornado struck six farms, including one where the house was blown away, killing the sleeping farmer who was the house at the time.	NWS
April 24	1955	United States	Alabama	Falkville	5 (20 Injuries)	This tornado moved through rural areas of Morgan County before moving directly through Falkville.	NWS
May 25	1955	United States	Texas, Oklahoma	Sweetwater (OK)	2 (18 Injuries)	1955 Great Plains tornado outbreak – F4 damage occurred in both Texas and Oklahoma. 13 farm homes were destroyed, some of which were swept away. 100 cattle were killed and a car was carried 700 feet (0.13 mi).	NWS
June 4	1955	United States	Kansas, Nebraska	Formoso (KS)	0	A large, long-tracked tornado carved a 61.9-mile path of damage through rural Kansas and Nebraska.	NWS
June 4	1955	United States	Kansas	Kinsley	0	A Long-tracked tornado went directly through the town of Kinsley on its 72.2-mile path.	NWS
June 27	1955	United States	Nebraska	Mitchell, Scottsbluff, Minatare, Bayard	2 (29 Injuries)	1955 Scottsbluff tornado - This tornado struck Scottsbluff and surrounding areas.	NWS
July 2	1955	United States	North Dakota	Richland County	2 (19 Injuries)	This tornado struck rural Richland County completely leveling or sweeping away 11 farms, including one farm that appeared to show potential F5 damage after a home was completely swept away.	NWS
July 5	1955	United States	North Dakota	Mountrail County, Ward County, Renville County	0	This tornado tracked 28 miles through rural North Dakota.	NWS
July 7	1955	United States	Minnesota	Lyon County	1 (13 Injuries)	This long-track tornado moved through Lyon County.	NWS
February 24–25	1956	United States	Missouri, Illinois	St. Louis (MO), Dupo (IL), Crest Hill (IL), Belleville (IL), Swansea (IL), Shiloh (IL), O'Fallon (IL), Lebanon (IL), Breese (IL)	6 (36 Injuries)	A large, long-tracked tornado struck the southwestern, southern, and eastern suburbs of St. Louis (MO) along its 77.6-mile path that started on February 24 and ended on February 25.	NWS
March 6	1956	United States	Indiana	Grant County	1 (31 Injuries)	This tornado formed and moved northwest east of Marion.	NWS
April 2	1956	United States	Oklahoma, Kansas	Howard (KS), Toronto (KS), Gridley (KS)	2 (29 Injuries)	Tornado outbreak of April 2–3, 1956 – This tornado quickly intensified to near-F5 intensity just south of the Oklahoma–Kansas state line. In the area, one home was completely swept away and many trees were debarked. A savings bond from that home was found near Williamsburg, Kansas—more than 100 mi (160 km) from its origin. Near Maple City, Kansas, a plastic belt was found embedded in a broken tree. The tornado continued southwest of Toronto, leveling one home and killing one man. The tornado then continued to total another home injuring 3. A trailer was destroyed as well, killing a baby inside. Its body was allegedly found 1 mi (1.6 km) away.	NWS
April 3	1956	United States	Oklahoma, Kansas, Missouri	Miami (OK), Quapaw (OK), Baxter Springs (KS), Joplin (MO), Webb City (MO)	0 (59 Injuries)	Tornado outbreak of April 2–3, 1956 – A large, long-tracked tornado touched down just after midnight local time and struck the towns of Miami and Quapaw with F4 damage. 46 injuries and 56 homes were damaged or destroyed in Miami alone. The tornado destroyed five more homes in Quapaw, with total Oklahoma losses estimated at $500,000. The tornado then crossed the Oklahoma–Kansas state line into Baxter Springs, destroying 14 homes, damaging 13, and causing $125,000 damage, with six injuries reported. A baseball grandstand was destroyed, and trees were uprooted as well. The tornado crossed into Missouri west of Joplin and passed through Webb City, damaging 30 homes and several businesses.	NWS
April 3	1956	United States	Wisconsin	Berlin	7 (50 Injuries)	Tornado outbreak of April 2–3, 1956 – A factory and at least 20 homes were destroyed, some of which were leveled. Light items from Berlin were found up to 75 miles (121 km) away.	NWS
April 3	1956	United States	Tennessee	Lexington	3 (60 Injuries)	Tornado outbreak of April 2–3, 1956 – This tornado destroyed 46 homes and two businesses in Lexington. In the town, 20 businesses and 250 homes were damaged. Bodies were thrown 100 yards (91 m) from a home that 'exploded'.	NWS
April 3	1956	United States	Michigan	Saugatuck, Holland	0 (7 Injuries)	1956 Saugatuck–Holland tornado – A tornado formed off the coast of Lake Michigan and quickly moved inland, destroying the historic Kalamazoo River Lighthouse at the mouth of the Kalamazoo River and severely damaging or destroying several other structures. This tornado was originally assumed to be part of the path of an F5 tornado that impacted the Grand Rapids metropolitan area, but in recent times, this has been disproven.	NWS
April 3	1956	United States	Michigan	Lake Ann	1 (25 Injuries)	Tornado outbreak of April 2–3, 1956 – This possible tornado family destroyed 13 homes and at least 26 barns before ending over Grand Traverse Bay. Two homes in Benzie County were leveled to the ground, one of which was a multi-story building in which one person died. Other homes were reported destroyed in Lake Ann, southeast of Solon and in Cedar Run. One barn was also destroyed at Bear Lake. The tornado affected very rural areas for most of its life.	NWS
April 15	1956	United States	Alabama	Pleasant Grove, McDonald Chapel, Edgewater, Birmingham, Fultondale, Tarrant	25 (200 Injuries)	1956 McDonald Chapel tornado –	NWS
May 12	1956	United States	Michigan	Flint, Burton	3 (116 Injuries)		NWS
May 12	1956	United States, Canada	Michigan, Ontario	Allen Park (MI), Lincoln Park (MI), Ecorse (MI), LaSalle (ON)	0 (22 Injuries)		NWS, EC
June 6	1956	United States	Nebraska	Pleasanton	0		NWS
October 29	1956	United States	Nebraska	North Platte	0 (2 Injuries)		NWS
January 22	1957	United States	Oklahoma	Gans	10 (20 Injuries)		NWS
April 2	1957	United States	Oklahoma	Lake Texoma	2 (6 Injuries)	Tornado outbreak sequence of April 2–5, 1957 –	NWS
April 2	1957	United States	Oklahoma	Calera, Durant	3 (3 Injuries)	Tornado outbreak sequence of April 2–5, 1957 –	NWS
April 8	1957	United States	South Carolina, North Carolina	Jefferson (SC), Roseboro (NC),	4 (80 Injuries)	Tornado outbreak of April 8, 1957 –	NWS
April 19	1957	United States	Wisconsin	New Lisbon	1		NWS
April 21	1957	United States	Texas	Littlefield	0 (7 Injuries)		NWS
April 21	1957	United States	Texas	Slaton, Lubbock	0 (6 Injuries)		NWS
April 25	1957	United States	Nebraska	Milford, Lincoln, Ashland, Papillion, La Vista	1 (8 Injuries)		NWS
May 15	1957	United States	Texas	Silverton	21 (80 Injuries)		NWS
May 20	1957	United States	Kansas	Cloud County, Republic County, Washington County	0	May 1957 Central Plains tornado outbreak sequence – Wedge tornado produced "near-F5" damage on several farms and was observed with multiple satellite tornadoes. Several different tornadoes may have produced the damage, perhaps a tornado family.	NWS
May 21	1957	United States	Wisconsin, Minnesota	Polk County (WI), Burnett County (WI), Chisago County (MN)	0 (2 Injuries)	May 1957 Central Plains tornado outbreak sequence –	NWS
May 21	1957	United States	Missouri	Fremont, Van Buren	7 (75 Injuries)	May 1957 Central Plains tornado outbreak sequence –	NWS
May 24	1957	United States	Oklahoma	Lawton	4 (5 Injuries)	Tornado outbreak of May 24–25, 1957 –	NWS
June 14	1957	United States	Illinois	Southern View, Springfield	2 (50 Injuries)		NWS
July 4	1957	United States	Michigan	Wixom, Farmington Hills, Franklin, Bingham Farms, Beverly Hills, Berkley, Clawson	0 (6 Injuries)		NWS
September 14	1957	United States	Oklahoma	Wanette, Asher, Wewoka, Wetumka	2 (6 Injuries)		NWS
November 7	1957	United States	Texas	Bridge City, West Orange, Orange	1 (81 Injuries)	Tornado outbreak of November 7–8, 1957 –	NWS
November 17	1957	United States	Alabama	Cullman County	4 (15 Injuries)		NWS
November 18	1957	United States	Alabama	Susan Moore, Snead, Douglas, Horton, Albertville	3 (12 Injuries)		NWS
December 18	1957	United States	Illinois	Mount Vernon	1 (45 Injuries)	Tornado outbreak sequence of December 18–20, 1957 –	NWS
December 18	1957	United States	Illinois	Gorham, Murphysboro, De Soto, Hurst, Bush	11 (200 Injuries)	Tornado outbreak sequence of December 18–20, 1957 –	NWS
December 19	1957	United States	Arkansas	Columbia County, Ouachita County	2 (9 Injuries)	Tornado outbreak sequence of December 18–20, 1957 –	NWS
April 15	1958	United States	Florida	Polk County	0 (7 Injuries)	Tornado outbreak of April 15, 1958 –	NWS
June 4	1958	United States	Wisconsin	Chippewa Falls	3 (50 Injuries)	Tornado outbreak of June 3–4, 1958 –	NWS
June 4	1958	United States	Wisconsin	Fall Creek	4 (3 Injuries)	Tornado outbreak of June 3–4, 1958 –	NWS
June 10	1958	United States	Kansas	El Dorado	15 (5 Injuries)		NWS
February 10	1959	United States	Missouri, Illinois	Twin Oaks (MO), Warson Woods (MO), Rock Hill (MO), Brentwood (MO), Maplewood (MO), St. Louis (MO), Brooklyn (IL), Venice (IL)	21 (345 Injuries)	St. Louis tornado outbreak of February 1959 – This large tornado moved through northwestern portion of Downtown St. Louis, producing widespread F3 damage along isolated pockets of F4 damage. The worst damage occurred as the tornado tore the Forest Park and into the Central West End, Vandeventer, Covenant Blu-Grand Center, and Jeff Vanderlou neighborhoods. Many homes were heavily damaged were heavily damaged or destroyed, including some that were leveled. Apartments, stores, and numerous other buildings as well as automobiles were heavily damaged or destroyed and trees and power lines were downed. Debris littered the streets and hundreds of people trapped in the rubble of the collapsed buildings after the tornado. A severe thunderstorm warning had been in effect for this storm, but forecasters did not see enough evidence in their World War II-vintage radar to issue a tornado warning, especially since this was during the Winter months.	NWS
March 31	1959	United States	Texas	Aquilla, Hillsboro	6 (31 Injuries)		NWS
May 9	1959	United States	Oklahoma	Stonewall	7 (12 Injuries)		NWS
May 10	1959	United States	Iowa	Adair, Panora, Dawson, Angus	0 (1 Injury)		NWS
May 20	1959	United States	Iowa	Plano	0 (5 Injuries)		NWS
September 26	1959	United States	Missouri	Wright County	0		NWS
September 27	1959	United States	Oklahoma, Kansas	Chetopa (KS)	1 (1 Injury)		NWS

== See also ==
- Tornado intensity and damage
- List of tornadoes and tornado outbreaks
- List of F5 and EF5 tornadoes
- List of F4 and EF4 tornadoes
  - List of F4 and EF4 tornadoes (1960–1969)
  - List of F4 and EF4 tornadoes (2000–2009)
  - List of F4 and EF4 tornadoes (2010–2019)
  - List of F4 and EF4 tornadoes (2020–present)
- List of tornadoes striking downtown areas
- Tornado myths
