= Tornado outbreak sequence of June 25–27, 1951 =

Weather event in the United States

Meteorological history
- Formed: June 25, 1951
- Dissipated: June 27, 1951

Tornado outbreak
- Tornadoes: 13
- Max. rating: F4 tornado
- Duration: 3 days, 7 hours, 50 minutes

Overall effects
- Fatalities: 6 (+7 non-tornadic)
- Injuries: 161 (+23 non-tornadic)
- Damage: $10.283 million (1951 USD) $128 million (2025 USD)
- Areas affected: Great Plains, Midwest, Mid-Atlantic
- Part of the tornado outbreaks of 1951

A destructive outbreak sequence triggered 13 tornadoes from Nebraska to Virginia. The most and strongest tornadic activity, as well as most of the casualties, including all the deaths, came on June 27, when a catastrophic early-morning F4 tornado killed five and injured 100 in Kansas while two F3 tornadoes caused a combined 50 injuries and one fatality in Illinois later that afternoon. Overall, the outbreak sequence killed six, injured 161, and caused $10.283 million in damage.

== Meteorological synopsis ==
A low-pressure system formed over southern British Columbia on June 23 and moved southeastward into Montana. Storm fronts coming from this system and another one out of California began to fully form into thunderstorms, heavy rain and hail over Nebraska and Minnesota on June 25. By late on June 26, a weak warm front became draped over the Central Plains stretching from southeastern Colorado northeastward through Kansas to northern Missouri. This became the focal point for two early morning tornadoes in central part of Kansas, including a violent and deadly F4 tornado in Wakeeney. Meanwhile, a low-pressure system formed over southern Minnesota on June 24 while another one formed over northeastern Illinois northwest of Chicago on June 26. These systems moved eastward across the Great Lakes and Northeastern United States producing multiple rounds of severe weather here and in the Mid-Atlantic.

== Confirmed tornadoes ==
Confirmed tornadoes by Fujita rating
FU	F0	F1	F2	F3	F4	F5	Total
0	0	6	4	2	1	0	13

=== June 25 event ===
List of confirmed tornadoes – Monday, June 25, 1951 (Note: All dates are based on the local time zone where the tornado touched down; however, all times are in Coordinated Universal Time and dates are split at midnight CST/CDT for consistency.) (Note: Prior to 1994, only the average widths of tornado paths were officially listed.)
F#	Location	County / Parish	State	Start coord.	Time (UTC)	Path length	Max. width	Summary
F2	Dunnell to SSW of Fairmont	Martin	MN	43.57°N 94.77°W	21:00–?	14.2 miles (22.9 km)	10 yards (9.1 m)	Barns and outbuildings on 10 farms were demolished by this narrow, but strong northeastward-moving tornado. Homes and barns were damaged or moved from their foundations, granaries, silos, windmills, farm machinery, and automobiles were damaged or wrecked, poultry and livestock were killed, haystacks were scattered, trees were uprooted, power poles and wires were downed, and crops were damaged. Losses totaled $250,000. Very large hail to the size of tennis balls accompanied this tornado, causing additional damage to homes and property.
F2	Sidney	Cheyenne	NE	41.10°N 103.05°W	21:30–?	10.4 miles (16.7 km)	57 yards (52 m)	This narrow, but strong tornado struck the Sidney Municipal Airport, badly damaging a hangar, house trailer, and one plane, although a damage estimate was not given. One person was injured. The CDNS report list the start time as 20:50 UTC. The tornado was not rated as significant (F2+) by Grazulis.
F2	Duncan to Crystal Lake	Hancock	IA	43.22°N 93.80°W	23:07–?	.8 miles (1.3 km)	500 yards (460 m)	This destructive tornado, which was embedded within a much larger area of damaging winds and hail, caused catastrophic damage in and between Duncan and Crystal Lake. In Duncan, the tornado destroyed the largest buildings in town. A large church and community center as well as all 21 homes in town were damaged or destroyed. Four people were injured in the town. The tornado then demolished four rural farmsteads, killed livestock, and overturned a freight train before striking Crystal Lake. Four homes were demolished, many more were damaged and four people were injured. In all, eight people were injured. The storm as a whole caused $4.5 million in damage in Franklin and Hancock Counties, but the damage estimate from the tornado itself was not given. The CDNS report listed that the tornado caused a fatality in Duncan, but that was not included in the NCEI database. The NCEI track of the tornado only shows it striking Crystal Lake as well. Grazulis rated the tornado F3.
F1	S of Sedgwick to W of Holyoke	Sedgwick, Phillips	CO	40.85°N 102.50°W	23:45–?	20.2 miles (32.5 km)	33 yards (30 m)	Weak tornado damaged mostly crops, windows, and small buildings. One person was injured.

=== June 26 event ===
List of confirmed tornadoes – Tuesday, June 26, 1951 (Note: Prior to 1994, only the average widths of tornado paths were officially listed.)
F#	Location	County / Parish	State	Start coord.	Time (UTC)	Path length	Max. width	Summary
F1	Belleville	Wood	WV	39.13°N 81.70°W	20:00–?	.1 miles (0.16 km)	250 yards (230 m)	A waterspout developed over the Ohio River on the Ohio-West Virginia border and moved inland. One person was injured, although no damage estimate was given. The tornado was accompanied by strong straight-line winds that caused additional damage to farm buildings and trees.
F1	NW of Midland	Midland	MI	43.67°N 84.33°W	00:00–?	.1 miles (0.16 km)	33 yards (30 m)	Several trees, barns and a house were blown down. Damage was estimated at $25,000. Grazulis rated the tornado F2.

=== June 27 event ===
List of confirmed tornadoes – Wednesday, June 27, 1951 (Note: Prior to 1994, only the average widths of tornado paths were officially listed.)
F#	Location	County / Parish	State	Start coord.	Time (UTC)	Path length	Max. width	Summary
F4	WaKeeney	Trego	KS	39.03°N 99.88°W	06:10–?	.8 miles (1.3 km)	300 yards (270 m)	5 deaths – The roar of this short-lived, but violent tornado was heard just prior to it moving directly through WaKeeney shortly after midnight, causing catastrophic damage. A total of 45 homes were destroyed while 60 others were damaged. 100 people were injured and damage was estimated at $2.5 million. The tornado was accompanied by high winds and hail that caused additional damage.
F1	W of Hays	Ellis	KS	39.03°N 99.88°W	07:00–?	.1 miles (0.16 km)	33 yards (30 m)	This tornado came from the same storm that produced the Wakeeney tornado. A farm was damaged with losses totaling $2,500. The tornado was also accompanied by high winds and hail that caused additional damage.
F1	N of Seven Mile to Jacksonburg	Butler	OH	39.50°N 84.58°W	12:00–?	4.7 miles (7.6 km)	33 yards (30 m)	This tornado accompanied by heavy rain and strong winds caused severe damage along its path with losses totaling $2.5 million. The CDNS report says the tornado hit Carlisle as well.
F3	S of Latham to Heman to NW of Forsyth	Logan, Macon	IL	39.95°N 89.17°W	01:30–?	9.6 miles (15.4 km)	300 yards (270 m)	This tornado accompanied by heavy rain and severe activity completely destroyed two farms near Heman with Grazulis noting that this was "probable F4 damage". 35 people were injured and losses totaled $2.5 million.
F3	S of Emden to Northern Atlanta to N of Waynesville	Logan, De Witt	IL	40.27°N 89.47°W	01:30–?	18.2 miles (29.3 km)	200 yards (180 m)	1 death – This tornado accompanied by heavy rain and severe activity completely destroyed several farms along its path. 15 people were injured and losses totaled $2.5 million. Grazulis rated the tornado F2, although he noted that near-F3 damage occurred at one of the farms.
F2	Dayton to Smicksburg	Armstrong, Indiana	PA	40.58°N 79.25°W	01:30–?	19.7 miles (31.7 km)	33 yards (30 m)	This tornado touched down near Dayton and moved southeastward to Smicksburg. Two barns were unroofed, two silos demolished, trees were uprooted with some falling onto homes and across highways, and power and phone services disrupted. Losses totaled $2,500. The NCEI track has a path moving northeastward from north of Aultman through Beyer to Smicksburg. The tornado was not rated as significant by Grazulis.

== Non-tornadic effects ==
Lightning damaged or destroyed multiple buildings near Long Prairie, Minnesota during the morning hours of June 25. That afternoon, lightning killed one and injured two others in Greenwood County, Kansas. Straight-line winds, hail, heavy rain, flooding caused damage in Colorado, Minnesota, Iowa, Nebraska, the Carolinas, Tennessee and Georgia, notably Atlanta. Hail also injured two and killed livestock in Sedgwick, Colorado. Lightning caused damage in Bredenton, Tennessee and Nemaha County, Kansas early on June 26. Severe thunderstorms and lightning caused more damage that afternoon from Georgia to Virginia. One person was injured by lightning in Sampson County, North Carolina near Clinton while two other people were killed in Sumter, South Carolina. In Georgia, one person was killed by lightning in Union City and injured another person in Hapeville. Severe storms covered large sections of the Eastern United States and the Great Lakes on June 27. Severe winds, hail, lightning, and flooding killed three and injured 17.

== See also ==
- List of North American tornadoes and tornado outbreaks
  - List of F4 and EF4 tornadoes
