= 1951 Corn tornado =

1951 F3 tornado in Oklahoma

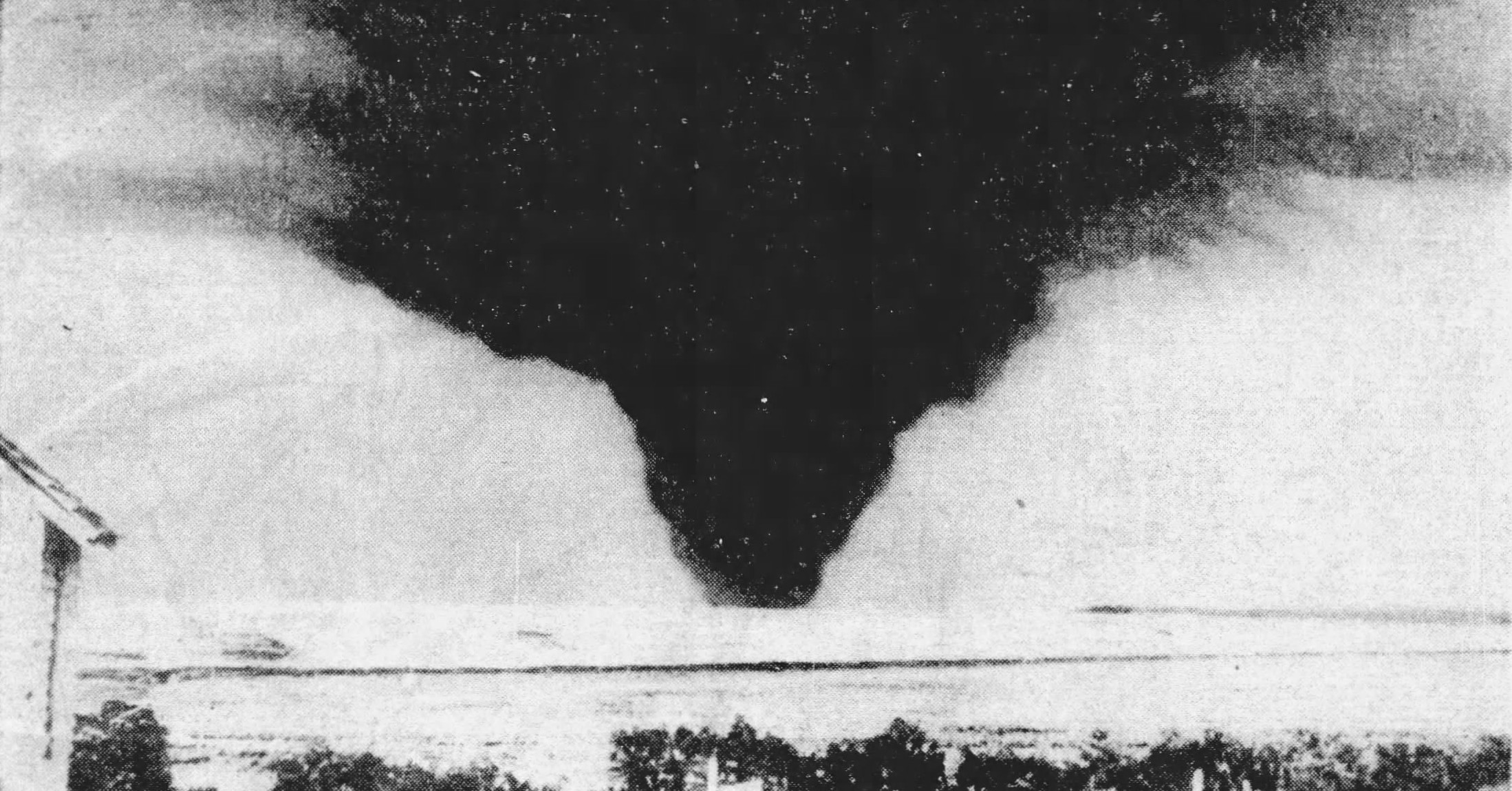
- The tornado as it was going through Corn.

Meteorological history
- Date: June 8, 1951

F3 tornado
- on the Fujita scale
- Fujita Scale (NWS)
- Highest winds: >158 mph (254 km/h)

Overall effects
- Fatalities: 0 (+1 indirect)
- Injuries: 0
- Damage: $250,000 (1951 USD)
- Areas affected: Corn
- Part of the Tornadoes of 1951

During the later evening hours of June 8, 1951, an intense and destructive F3 tornado travelled through mid-west Oklahoma affecting the towns of Corn and Colony, Oklahoma. The tornado would become the first tornado caught on motion pictures in the United States. (Note: The first Video was captured in Cuba in 1930's) The tornado would not cause a direct fatality on injury, though one man was killed when he was struck by lightning. The tornado would travel 11 miles and would reach its widest point of 173 yards (519 ft.) near Corn and Colony.

A tornado warning gave residents ample time to seek shelter in homes as the tornado would just miss downtown Corn. The tornado would move extremely slow at around 10 mph, heading in a southeastern direction. After exiting Corn, it would then converge with another tornado and strengthen it as it would enter Colony a few miles away.

After damaging several houses in Colony, it would then enter a rope-out phase and dissipate just southeast of Colony. While no one was directly affected by the tornado, one man was killed when struck by a lightning bolt while the tornado was still on the ground. The tornado would inflict $250,000 (1951 USD), in 11 mi (18 kilometres), though the time on the ground is unknown.

== Meteorological synopsis ==
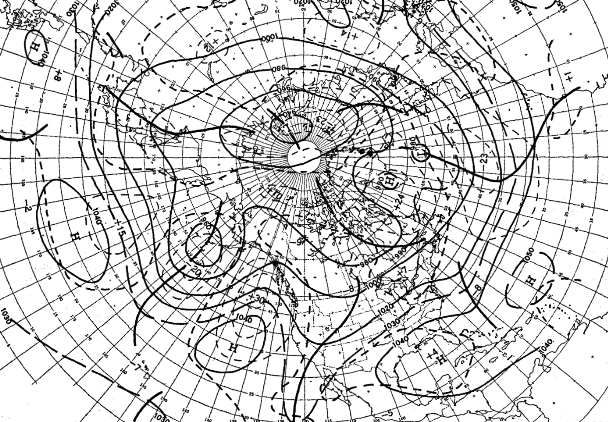
A large high pressure area over in the Gulf of Mexico.

The mouth of June was average, with temperatures around 76.1 degrees Fahrenheit (24.5 degrees Celsius) and precipitation around 4.79 inches (12.2 cm). On June 8, heavy rain and hail accompanied the severe thunderstorms that spawned the tornadoes. The first tornado in the localized tornado outbreak would be an F2 in Alabama that would injure 2. Another F2 would strike Douglas County in Kansas causing damage to a barn.

== Tornado summary ==
An excerpt from the original video. Note the slowness of its movement.

The Corn tornado would touch down from clouds about 5,000 ft high at approximately 6:30 PM CST, just northwest of Corn, about 13.5 miles (21.7 km) southeast of Clinton. As it entered Corn, a tornado warning was issued for Corn and Colony. The tornado would cause at least $250,000 (1951 USD) in damage there. The tornado would continue out of Corn and connect with a separate tornado that was also causing damage. This tornado was not counted in the list of tornadoes. The tornado would weaken as it crossed plains northwest of Colony. Here, John Gosen would record the first Video in United States of a tornado. The video shows a multi-vortex tornado crossing into Colony at a slow speed. (Note: While specific forward speed (mph) is not cited in the records, historical accounts from the time specifically characterize it as "slow moving") The tornado would dissipate shortly after entering Caddo County, about 3 miles east of Colony.

== Aftermath ==
After the tornado dissipated, it had accumulated over $250,000 (1951 USD) in damages in 11 miles. Several hundred of livestock were killed, though no direct human fatalities occurred. It would ultimately destroy 25 homes and 22 farm buildings causing hundreds of thousands of dollars to fix. One man was killed when he was struck by lightning. The tornado was the most notable among the tornado outbreak.

== Other tornadoes ==
Confirmed tornadoes by Fujita rating
FU	F0	F1	F2	F3	F4	F5	Total
0	0	4	2	1	0	0	7

Several other tornadoes would touch down across Alabama, Kansas, Missouri, and Oklahoma. An F2 near Plevna, Alabama, north of New Market, caused a home to be leveled, resulting in two minor injuries, while a granary was destroyed, and other buildings were damaged. Another F2 tornado near Clinton Lake, southwest of Lawrence in Douglas County, Kansas, damaged a barn, removing the roof and destroying the front and sides. Overall, 7 tornadoes were confirmed.

== See also ==
- Tornadoes of 1951
- List of meteorological photos and videos
