= Tornado outbreak of June 19, 1951 =

Weather event on the Great Plains and Midwestern United States

Meteorological history
- Formed: June 19, 1951

Tornado outbreak
- Tornadoes: 5
- Max. rating: F4 tornado
- Duration: 4 hours, 50 minutes

Overall effects
- Fatalities: 1 (+1 non-tornadic)
- Injuries: 20 (+6 non-tornadic)
- Damage: $5.030 million (1951 USD) $62.4 million (2025 USD)
- Areas affected: Great Plains, Midwestern United States
- Part of the tornado outbreaks of 1951

Five scattered tornadoes touched down across the Great Plains and Midwestern United States on June 19, 1951. The event was highlighted by a large, violent F4 tornado family that moved through the western and northern suburbs of Minneapolis, causing all the tornadic casualties from the outbreak. In all, one person was killed, 20 others were injured, and damage was estimated at $62.4 million (2025 USD). There was one additional death and six injuries from non-tornadic events as well. (Note: An outbreak is generally defined as a group of at least six tornadoes (the number sometimes varies slightly according to local climatology) with no more than a six-hour gap between individual tornadoes. An outbreak sequence, prior to (after) the start of modern records in 1950, is defined as a period of no more than two (one) consecutive days without at least one significant (F2 or stronger) tornado.) (Note: The Fujita scale was devised under the aegis of scientist T. Theodore Fujita in the early 1970s. Prior to the advent of the scale in 1971, tornadoes in the United States were officially unrated. While the Fujita scale has been superseded by the Enhanced Fujita scale in the U.S. since February 1, 2007, Canada utilized the old scale until April 1, 2013; nations elsewhere, like the United Kingdom, apply other classifications such as the TORRO scale.) (Note: Historically, the number of tornadoes globally and in the United States was and is likely underrepresented: research by Grazulis on annual tornado activity suggests that, as of 2001, only 53% of yearly U.S. tornadoes were officially recorded. Documentation of tornadoes outside the United States was historically less exhaustive, owing to the lack of monitors in many nations and, in some cases, to internal political controls on public information. Most countries only recorded tornadoes that produced severe damage or loss of life. Significant low biases in U.S. tornado counts likely occurred through the early 1990s, when advanced NEXRAD was first installed and the National Weather Service began comprehensively verifying tornado occurrences.)

== Meteorological synopsis ==
A low-pressure area formed over northeastern South Dakota very early on June 19. As other storms formed across the Central U.S. throughout the day, this low moved slowly eastward into Minnesota, becoming the focal point for locally strong to severe storms, including two that would produce a violent F4 tornado family and a strong F2 tornado.

== Confirmed tornadoes ==
Confirmed tornadoes by Fujita rating
FU	F0	F1	F2	F3	F4	F5	Total
0	1	2	1	0	1	0	5

Note: Several tornadoes were reported in the CDNS report but not confirmed in the final count:

- A possible tornado was sighted 15 miles (24 km) northeast of Ashland, Kansas, but it was not confirmed. However, this may have actually been the tornado confirmed on the day instead of the Comanche County, Kansas, F0 tornado. The tornado was spotted right before a hail and high wind storm which had originated about 6 miles (9.7 km) north of Ashland moved southward and caused a 12-mile (19 km) wide swath of damage. High winds flattened nearly ripe wheat, while hail caused extensive damage to crops and light damage to property. The damage ended about 2–6 miles (3.2–9.7 km) south of town.
- A small tornado, which was followed by hail, damaged a house, uprooted trees, and flattened 20 acres of corn and a garden at a farm 10 miles (16 km) east of Ottawa, Kansas.

=== June 19 event ===
Confirmed tornadoes – Tuesday, June 19, 1951 (Note: All dates are based on the local time zone where the tornado touched down; however, all times are in Coordinated Universal Time and dates are split at midnight CST/CDT for consistency.) (Note: Prior to 1994, only the average widths of tornado paths were officially listed.)
F#	Location	County / Parish	State	Start coord.	Time (UTC)	Path length	Max. width	Damage
F1	NE of Alvord	Lyon	IA	43.38°N 96.25°W	22:00–?	0.5 miles (0.80 km)	17 yards (16 m)	—N/a
F1	A funnel cloud was observed with this tornado in Allison Township. Barns, granaries, corn crops, and trees were damaged.							
F4	Hutchinson to Hamel to Brooklyn Center to Spring Lake Park	McLeod, Wright, Hennepin, Anoka	MN	44.88°N 94.37°W	23:30–?	52.6 miles (84.7 km)	330 yards (300 m)	$5 million (1951 USD)
F4	1 death – See section on this tornado – There were 20 injuries.							
F1	SSW of Ardmore, SD	Sioux	NE	42.95°N 103.88°W	23:45–?	4.7 miles (7.6 km)	110 yards (100 m)	$2,500 (1951 USD)
F1	This tornado moved through open farmlands 18 miles (29 km) north of Harrison. The CDNS report stated that one person was injured, but this was not officially documented.							
F0	WNW of Aetna	Comanche	KS	37.1°N 99.1°W	00:00–?	0.1 miles (0.16 km)	33 yards (30 m)	$2,500 (1951 USD)
F0	This tornado, which was accompanied by over 3 inches (7.6 cm) hail that damaged Coldwater, may have actually been the tornado that was reported in Clark County as this one supposedly occurred on June 20. It struck a farm, tearing down a new granary and a barn and damaging a car. The tornado may have crossed the state line into Oklahoma, but this was not confirmed.							
F2	Brownsville	Dodge	WI	43.62°N 88.5°W	02:50–?	1 mile (1.6 km)	467 yards (427 m)	$25,000 (1951 USD)
F2	This probable tornado was later confirmed. A large barn was obliterated with its contents scattered over a wide area, including two large beams that were impaled into the side of a farm house. Large trees were snapped "like match sticks" as well. Losses totaled $25,000.							

=== Hutchinson–Hamel–Brooklyn Center–Spring Lake Park, Minnesota ===
Hutchinson–Hamel–Brooklyn Center–Spring Lake Park, Minnesota
F4 tornado
- on the Fujita scale

Overall effects
- Fatalities: 1
- Injuries: 20
- Damage: $5 million

This violent F4 tornado family, which was accompanied by heavy rain and large hail, was first observed touching down in McLeod County west of Hutchinson. A car in this area was picked up, thrown 300 yd (270 m), and totaled. The occupants in the car, a police chief and his son, escaped without any injuries. The tornado then moved directly through Hutchinson at around 5:30 pm CT. An icehouse, warehouse, houses, barns and outbuildings were obliterated, and about 50 city dwellings, buildings, and street carnival concessions were damaged. Additionally, many windows were blown in or broken; chimneys, billboards, signs, and power and communication lines were blown down; cars and growing crops were damaged or destroyed; and hundreds of trees were uprooted. Two homes sustained low-end F3 damage and debris from the town was strewn along MN 7. Most of the town was left without power after the storm as well. The tornado then moved northeastward, heavily damaging several farms north of Silver Lake, possibly lifting before reaching Wright County.

Heavy rain and hail continued with the storm before the tornado touched down again in Hennepin County at around 6:30 pm CT. It intensified as it approached MN 55 and became a violent F4 tornado as it passed near Hamel, about 6 mi (9.7 km) west of Robbinsdale. As it reached the highway, it threw a home 200 yd (180 m) before leveling it, severely injuring the elderly woman in the house. She would later die at the hospital; her nephew and foster daughter were also injured. The tornado also heavily damaged or destroyed other homes, a garage, and several other structures. The tornado then weakened, doing less severe damage, before restrengthening to an intense F3 tornado as it struck Brooklyn Center at around 7 pm CT. A trailer house was picked and thrown three blocks before being destroyed. Seven homes were also destroyed and clocks were stopped at 7:01 pm as the power went out. A boy was injured in the town as well. The tornado then crossed over into Anoka County northwest of Spring Lake Park, where more damage and destruction occurred and clocks were stopped at 7:03 pm CT. After either briefly weakening or possibly lifting, the tornado demolished several homes near the intersection of Foley Boulevard and US 10 (now County Road 10). Nine people, including seven children, were injured in one of the homes. The tornado then finally weakened before dissipating shortly thereafter. Across this portion of the path, the tornado damaged or destroyed 50 homes as well as many other buildings.

The tornado family caused $5 million in damage killed one person and injured 20 others. The same storm also produced a tornado report east of St. Paul at around 7:45 pm CT, but that turned out to be a just a well-developed funnel cloud that never touched the ground.

== Non-tornadic impacts ==
Six cottages, boat buildings, and one farmstead were damaged by wind and hail in Brown's Lake and nearby Salix, Iowa, injuring two people. A small tornado was also reported in Brown's Lake, but it was not confirmed. A line of storms also brought wind and hail from Elliott to Morton Mills, severely damaging a barn and a house with minor damage to numerous other buildings, including extensive breakage of glass by hail. Electric service was also disrupted, and one person was injured. Another tornado was also reported near Elliott, but the event was not deemed to have not been the cause of the damage in the town. The strongest and most destructive line of storms produced hail ranging from .5–1.75 inches (1.3–4.4 cm) in diameter and moved from McCallsburg to Cedar Rapids, Iowa. In McCallsburg, golf ball-size hail inflicted severe damage throughout the town. 387 window panes of glass were shattered at the McCallsburg consolidated school, and all the businesses south of Main Street had shattered windows. The Bethany Lutheran church, which was still under construction at the time, had 41 window panes shattered. Many roofs had holes in them, which allowed heavy rain to go through them and cause more damage.

The hail became even larger as the storm moved eastward away from McCallsburg and struck St. Anthony and Clemons. Described as being the size of oranges, the hail left baseball-size holes in numerous roofs in both towns. Considerable damage was also reported at Garwin, Toledo, Tama, Vining, Elberon, and Keystone. An 82-year-old man died due to overexertion in the storm. Three more injuries also occurred: a man was severely burned by an electric line, and a woman and her child were hospitalized after being braised by hail. There was considerable damage to farm buildings, while minor damage was caused by falling trees all along the track of the storm. Hail damage was mainly to growing crops, but broken glass was also an issue in several towns. There was also mainly public utility line damage in Belle Plaine and Cedar Rapids.

There was also sporadic hail and wind damage in parts of Oklahoma and Kansas, as well as Bloomfield, Montana. This included Ellis County, Oklahoma, where hail was reportedly as much as a foot deep, while winds damaged a church in Arnett, Oklahoma. A lightning strike in southern Barber County, Kansas, about 6 miles (9.7 km) west of Hardtner, also caused a fire which destroyed a portion of a shed, along with the hay inside.

== See also ==
- List of North American tornadoes and tornado outbreaks
  - List of F4 and EF4 tornadoes

== Sources ==
- Brooks, Harold E. (April 2004). "On the Relationship of Tornado Path Length and Width to Intensity". Weather and Forecasting. 19 (2): 310–19. Bibcode:2004WtFor..19..310B. doi:10.1175/1520-0434(2004)019<0310:OTROTP>2.0.CO;2.
- Cook, A. R.; Schaefer, J. T. (August 2008). "The Relation of El Niño–Southern Oscillation (ENSO) to Winter Tornado Outbreaks". Monthly Weather Review. 136 (8): 3135. Bibcode:2008MWRv..136.3121C. doi:10.1175/2007MWR2171.1.
- Grazulis, Thomas P. (November 1990). Significant Tornadoes 1880–1989. Vol. 2. St. Johnsbury, Vermont: The Tornado Project of Environmental Films. ISBN 1-879362-02-3.
- Grazulis, Thomas P. (July 1993). Significant Tornadoes 1680–1991: A Chronology and Analysis of Events. St. Johnsbury, Vermont: The Tornado Project of Environmental Films. ISBN 1-879362-03-1.
- Grazulis, Thomas P. (2001a). The Tornado: Nature's Ultimate Windstorm. Norman, Oklahoma: University of Oklahoma Press. ISBN 978-0-8061-3538-0.
- Grazulis, Thomas P. (2001b). F5-F6 Tornadoes. St. Johnsbury, Vermont: The Tornado Project of Environmental Films.
