= Great Lakes tornadoes of September 26, 1951 =

Tornadoes impacting Wisconsin and Michigan

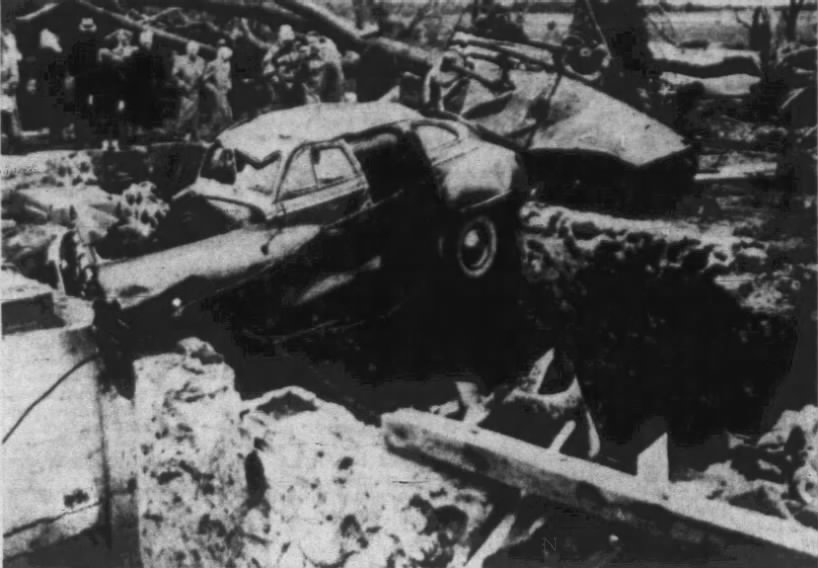
- A barn destroyed by the Waupaca tornado

Meteorological history
- Formed: September 26, 1951

Tornado outbreak
- Tornadoes: 3
- Max. rating: F4 tornado
- Duration: 6 hours, 15 minutes

Overall effects
- Fatalities: 8
- Injuries: 15
- Damage: $750,000 (1951 USD) $9.3 million (2025 USD)
- Areas affected: Wisconsin, Michigan
- Part of the tornado outbreaks of 1951

Three deadly tornadoes impacted Wisconsin and Michigan on September 26, 1951. Both tornadoes in Wisconsin were violent while the one in Michigan was also significant. Eight people were killed, 15 others were injured, and damages were estimated at $750,000.

== Meteorological synopsis ==
On September 23, a low-pressure area formed in the Southern Alaska panhandle. This low tracked southeastward for just over a day before turning and accelerating eastward, moving through British Columbia and crossing the international border into Montana, while another low pressure wave formed over extreme southwestern South Dakota from a small frontal wave. These lows moved in tandem and deepened rapidly as they moved into Minnesota on September 26. The northern low then rapidly weakened and dissipated as the southern one occluded and became dominant as it moved into northwestern Wisconsin that afternoon. An occluded front came off the low pressure area and split into cold and warm fronts with the former stretching southwestward into Kansas while the later moved into Southern Lower Michigan. With temperatures ranging from the lower 60s to the upper 70s, dewpoint temperatures ranging from the mid 50s to upper 60s, and upper-level wind shear of up to 65 knots, the environment was favorable for the development of thunderstorms, sparking a severe weather outbreak.

== Confirmed tornadoes ==
Confirmed tornadoes by Fujita rating
| FU | F0 | F1 | F2 | F3 | F4 | F5 | Total |
|---|---|---|---|---|---|---|---|
| 0 | 0 | 0 | 1 | 0 | 2 | 0 | 3 |

=== September 26 event ===
Confirmed tornadoes – Wednesday, September 26, 1951 (Note: All dates are based on the local time zone where the tornado touched down; however, all times are in Coordinated Universal Time and dates are split at midnight CST/CDT for consistency.) (Note: Prior to 1994, only the average widths of tornado paths were officially listed.)
| F# | Location | County / Parish | State | Start coord. | Time (UTC) | Path length | Max. width | Damage |
|---|---|---|---|---|---|---|---|---|
| F4 | NE of Blaine to Cobb Town to E of Manawa | Portage, Waupaca | WI | 44.33°N 89.3°W | 15:45–? | 26.4 miles (42.5 km) | 100 yards (91 m) | $500,000 (1951 USD) |
| F4 | 6 deaths – Several farm buildings were heavily damaged or destroyed with the greatest damage occurring just past Cobb Town about 3 miles (4.8 km) north of Waupaca. There, three farms were obliterated and swept away at near-F5 intensity. Five of the six people killed came from one family, who were killed as they were cleaning chickens on their porch on the opposite side of the house from the approaching tornado. The other fatality occurred in the Lebanon Township near Sugar Bush where a 40-year-old woman was killed in a flattened home. Three other people were injured. | | | | | | | |
| F4 | N of Rio to SE of Cambria | Columbia | WI | 43.47°N 89.25°W | 16:30–? | 9 miles (14 km) | 100 yards (91 m) | $250,000 (1951 USD) |
| F4 | 1 death – A violent tornado struck a farm. There, a large house and every farm building was obliterated, including the house of the hired hand who was killed with debris from the home being left in a pile 300 feet (91 m) from the foundation. Hundreds of trees were stripped and/or uprooted, including some that were 18 inches (46 cm) in diameter, and chickens were defeathered. Officially, nine people were injured, although the CDNS report list 10 injuries. The tornado was rated F3 by tornado researcher Thomas P. Grazulis. | | | | | | | |
| F2 | Lilley | Newaygo | MI | 43.78°N 85.87°W | 21:00–? | 2.3 miles (3.7 km) | 440 yards (400 m) | —N/a |
| F2 | 1 death – A strong tornado blew down the west and south concrete walls of a tavern before ripping off its roof. An I-beam was thrown 100 yards (91 m) while steel beams were thrown 70 yards (64 m). Three people were injured. | | | | | | | |

== Non-tornadic impacts ==
In the early morning hours of September 26, lightning heavily damaged three homes and destroyed two barns in Bettendorf, Iowa and Northern Illinois with one barn in the latter state completely burning. Most of Northern Illinois also saw considerable damage due to heavy rainfall. In Wisconsin, high winds of over 50 miles per hour (80 km/h) blew down trees and damaged power lines and buildings. Piers and docks on Lake Michigan, which was higher than normal for that time of year, were damaged by waves. Similar damage was seen in Michigan, where the apple harvest suffered thousands of dollars in losses. Lake shore properties along Lake Michigan and Lake Huron, which was also higher than normal, were damaged by high waves with Frankfort, DeTour, Escanaba, and the Western Lake Huron shores being particularly hard hit.

== See also ==
- List of North American tornadoes and tornado outbreaks
  - List of F4 and EF4 tornadoes
