= Sidney Municipal Airport (Nebraska) =

Sidney Municipal Airport Lloyd W. Carr Field
- IATA: SNY; ICAO: KSNY; FAA LID: SNY

Summary
- Airport type: Public
- Owner: Sidney Airport Authority
- Serves: Sidney, Nebraska
- Elevation AMSL: 4,314 ft / 1,315 m
- Coordinates: 41°05′59″N 102°59′06″W
- Interactive map of Sidney Municipal Airport

Runways
Direction	Length		Surface
Direction	ft	m	Surface
13/31	6,600	2,012	Concrete
3/21	4,705	1,434	Turf

Statistics (2022)
- Aircraft operations (year ending 6/2/2022): 4,100
- Based aircraft: 22
- Source: Federal Aviation Administration

Sidney Municipal Airport (IATA: SNY, ICAO: KSNY, FAA LID: SNY) (Lloyd W. Carr Field) is three miles south of Sidney, in Cheyenne County, Nebraska. It is owned by the Sidney Airport Authority.

The first airline flights were Frontier DC-3s in 1959; the last Frontier Twin Otter left in 1980.

== Facilities ==
The airport covers 732 acres (296 ha) at an elevation of 4,314 feet (1,315 m). It has two runways: 13/31 is 6,600 x 100 ft (2,012 x 30 m) concrete and 3/21 is 4,705 x 75 ft (1,434 x 23 m) turf.

In the year ending June 2, 2022, the airport had 4,100 aircraft operations, average 79 per day: 90% general aviation, 7% air taxi and 2% military. 22 aircraft were then based at the airport: 20 single-engine, 1 multi-engine, and 1 jet.

== See also ==
- List of airports in Nebraska
