= Plevna, Alabama =

- Unincorporated community
- Location within Alabama Location within the United States
- Coordinates: 34°57′42″N 86°25′00″W
- Country: United States
- State: Alabama
- County: Madison
- Elevation: 850 ft (259 m)
- Time zone: UTC-6 (Central (CST))
  - Summer (DST): UTC-5 (CDT)
- Area code: 256
- GNIS feature ID: 125066

Plevna is an unincorporated community in northeastern Madison County, Alabama, United States. Residents of Plevna have New Market addresses.

== History ==
Plevna is named in honor of Pleven, Bulgaria, which was a site of strategic importance during the Russo-Turkish War (1877–78). A post office operated under the name Plevna from 1878 to 1955.
