= Hamel, Minnesota =

Neighborhood in Medina, Minnesota, United States

- Neighborhood
- Location within Minnesota
- Coordinates: 45°02′28″N 93°31′32″W
- Country: United States
- State: Minnesota
- County: Hennepin
- Elevation: 1,020 ft (310 m)
- Time zone: UTC-6 (Central (CST))
  - Summer (DST): UTC-5 (CDT)
- ZIP code: 55340
- Area code: 763
- GNIS feature ID: 644599

Hamel (/ˈhæməl/ HAM-əl) is a neighborhood of Medina, Hennepin County, Minnesota, United States. Hamel has its own fire station and post office with ZIP code 55340.

The area was platted as a city as early as 1879, but efforts to incorporate failed, in part, because of the complication of the town straddling the borders of both Medina and Plymouth. The post office in Hamel serves both the northern portion of Medina and the southern area of Corcoran.
