= Belleville, West Virginia =

Unincorporated community in West Virginia, United States

Belleville
- Unincorporated community
- Location within the state of West Virginia Belleville (the United States)
- Coordinates: 39°07′29″N 81°44′10″W
- Country: United States
- State: West Virginia
- County: Wood
- Elevation: 594 ft (181 m)
- Time zone: UTC-5 (Eastern (EST))
  - Summer (DST): UTC-4 (EDT)
- ZIP code: 26133
- Area codes: 304 and 681
- GNIS feature ID: 1553848

Belleville (also Belville) is an unincorporated community in Wood County, West Virginia, United States.

== Belleville HydroElectric ==
In April 1999, Belleville HydroElectric, a 42 MW hydroelectricity power station, began operating on the East side of the Belleville Locks and Dam which are operated by the United States Army Corps of Engineers. The plant is operated by AMP-Ohio now known as American Municipal Power, Inc. (AMP).

== History ==
Pre European Settlement

Several thousand Hurons occupied present-day West Virginia during the late 16th and early 17th centuries. During the 17th century, the Iroquois Confederacy (then consisting of the Mohawk, Onondaga, Cayuga, Oneida, and Seneca tribes) drove the Hurons from the state and used it primarily as a hunting ground.

When Anglo-European peoples first came into this part of the Ohio Valley, no Native American tribe had permanent residence there. The tribal home of the Delaware nation was on the upper Muskingum. The Shawnees lived on the Scioto and the Great Hocking, and Miamis on the two rivers of that name. The Wyandottes occupied the country near the lakes. These tribes had traditions that at one time they had lived on the Ohio, but on-going conflict with the Iroquois Confederacy, or the Six Nations, made the mid-Ohio river valley a contested region. The area was regularly used as a native hunting and fishing ground up to colonial settlement.

Colonial

In 1744, Virginia officials purchased the Iroquois title of ownership to the lands west of the Virginia colonial frontier to the Ohio river in the Treaty of Lancaster.

The Delaware, Mingo, and Shawnee sided with the French during the French and Indian War (1755-1763). When the War concluded, England’s King George III feared that more tension between Native Americans and settlers was inevitable. King George III in his Proclamation of 1763, prohibited settlement west of the Allegheny Mountains. This proclamation said in part: "We do hereby forbid on pain of our displeasure, all our loving subjects from making any purchases or settlement whatever, or taking possession of any of the lands so reserved without our special leave or license."

Following the treaty of Fort Stanwix in 1768 all tribal lands south and east of the Ohio River were ceded to the Crown down to the mouth of the Tennessee River, and settlements sprang up all along the Ohio River. However, settlement was still legally limited. Legal title to land was not available until 1779, making it difficult to determine the area's first permanent European settlers.

In 1769, Captain William Crawford and several others surveyed lands on behalf of George Washington who was granted, by Robert Dinwiddie, the Governor of colonial Virginia, over 9,000 acres of land along the Ohio River for his service during the French and Indian War (1755-1763), to include the land at Belleville. In 1770, George Washington led a surveying party down the Ohio River from Fort Pitt (Pittsburgh) and explored the area personally. Washington received an official land grant for the lands he chose in Botetourt county on December 15, 1772. Washington sold the Belleville land tract to a land company for development.

Founding

In 1785, William Tilden, President of William Tilton and Company, a mercantile firm of Philadelphia with extensive land holdings along the Ohio River, to include the Belleville land tract purchased from Washington, entered into a business agreement with Joseph Wood of Pittsburgh. Wood was contracted to act as a land agent for the company and recruit prospective settlers. A colonizing expedition left Pittsburgh in the Fall of 1785 with the two men, four Scotch pioneer families from Pennsylvania, and several hired hands, and sailed down the Ohio River landing in present-day Belleville on December 16, 1785. They constructed a block house surrounded by a stockade and over the course of the next year cleared over 100 acres of land for cultivation, built several cabins, and named their new settlement Belleville. The 1785 settlers included James Pewthewer, William Ingals, David Jemerson (Jamison), Andrew McCash, Francis Andrews, and a Mr. McDonal, Mr. Greathouse, Mr. Tabor (Taylor), and Thomas Gilruth. In 1787 they were joined by the following persons: Joel and Joseph Dewey, Stephen Sherrod, Malcolm Colman, Petre and Andres Anderson and their families. About the year 1796 or 1797 the settlement at Bellville received additional of immigrants from Connecticut. This party was led by George D. Avery, a professional surveyor and civil engineer. Avery was granted leave to construct a dam on nearby Lee Creek near the falls and built a mill January 5, 1803 which served as a base for Avery's merchandise business there in connection with shipbuilding.

Civil War

The only major military action in Wood county was at Belleville on July 19, 1863, when Confederate General John H. Morgan attempted to cross the Ohio River after his raid through southern Ohio was ended by Union troops led by General Edward H. Hobson. The United States gunboat Moose and the armed steamer Allegheny Belle, part of the Union's Ohio River Fleet, Mississippi River Squadron, intercepted Morgan's troops as the men attempted to cross the Ohio River. Three hundred raiders successfully entered West Virginia while the remaining followed General Morgan into northern Ohio.
