= Bankston, Alabama =

Unincorporated community in Alabama, United States

- Unincorporated community
- Location in Alabama
- Coordinates: 33°40′17″N 87°40′17″W
- Country: United States
- State: Alabama
- County: Fayette
- Elevation: 358 ft (109 m)
- Time zone: UTC-6 (Central (CST))
  - Summer (DST): UTC-5 (CDT)
- ZIP code: 35542
- Area codes: 205, 659
- GNIS feature ID: 157884

Bankston (formerly, Bank's Tank, Bucksnort, and Byler) is an unincorporated community in Fayette County, Alabama, United States. Bankston is located on U.S. Route 43, 10.6 miles (17.1 km) east of Fayette.

== History ==
The community was originally known as Byler, as the road it was built on was constructed by John Byler. A water tank was then constructed by the railroad in the community, and it became known as Bank's Tank in honor of one of the railroad engineers. Later, the name was changed to Bankston. The community was also known as Bucksnort. A post office operated under the name Bucksnort from 1873 to 1894 and under the name Bankston thereafter.
