= Corn, Oklahoma =

- Town
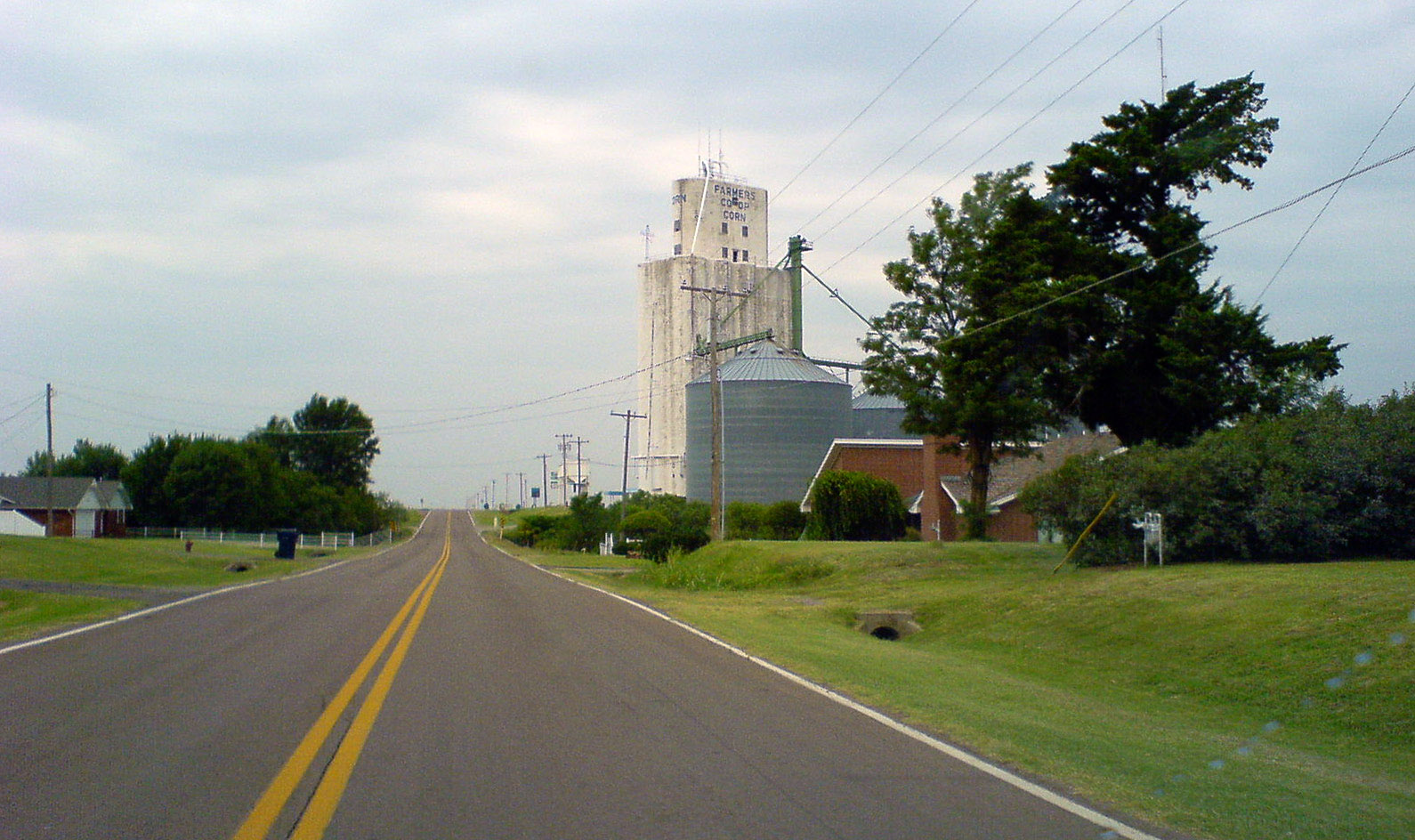

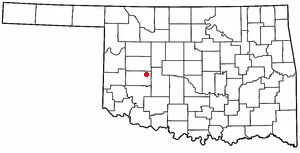
- Location of Corn, Oklahoma
- Coordinates: 35°22′45″N 98°46′54″W
- Country: United States
- State: Oklahoma
- County: Washita

Area
  - Total: 0.35 sq mi (0.90 km^{2})
  - Land: 0.35 sq mi (0.90 km^{2})
  - Water: 0 sq mi (0.00 km^{2})
- Elevation: 1,585 ft (483 m)

Population (2020)
  - Total: 592
  - Density: 1,698.6/sq mi (655.82/km^{2})
- Time zone: UTC-6 (Central (CST))
  - Summer (DST): UTC-5 (CDT)
- ZIP code: 73024
- Area code: 580
- FIPS code: 40-17300
- GNIS feature ID: 2413242
- Website: www.townofcornok.com

Corn is a town in Washita County, Oklahoma, United States. As of the 2020 census, Corn had a population of 592.

== Geography ==
Corn is located 13 miles northeast of Cordell in west-central Oklahoma.

The U.S. Census Bureau, reports that the town has a total area of 0.357 square miles (0.92 km^{2}), all land.

== History ==
=== Origins of the town name ===
The word Korn itself is a German word translated in English as 'grain'. Several sources confirm that the town settled by German immigrants received its name because its first post office was located in (or near) a corn field. As a result of anti-German sentiment during World War I, the name of the town was permanently changed from Korn to Corn.

=== Founding and early years ===
The town of Corn, or Korn—as it was spelled at that time—was originally settled by German-speaking Russian Mennonites. Around the time of the Cheyenne-Arapaho Land Run of 1892, Mennonite missionary John J. Kliewer, who was stationed at nearby Shelly Indian Mission, invited fellow Mennonites from Kansas to homestead lands left unclaimed by Cheyennes and Arapahos. Sixteen Mennonite families staked homestead claims in 1892. By 1893, forty families had settled in the area.

These Mennonite homesteaders brought with them a particular variety of winter wheat known as "Turkey Red", which grew particularly well in the western Oklahoma soil. In 1894, Peter Bergman donated part of his land to establish a place of worship. A rough Mennonite church was then built; a dugout with a low sloping roof and sides made of sod. Church benches were made from local Cottonwood trees. Between 1893 and 1920, a total of eight Mennonite churches were established within an eight-mile radius of the town. To mark its centennial year, Corn received a historical marker from the state honoring both its agricultural and Mennonite heritage.

On April 27, 1896, the Korn post office was established in a rural home, two and one-fourth miles north of the present-day town. Shortly thereafter, the post office was moved three miles north of the original site to a store owned by James Kendall. When Kendall's planned townsite failed to develop at the location, the post office was once again moved in 1903 to the present day site of the town of Corn, finding its new home in the merchandise store of George B. Flaming.

World War I brought down harassment both from vigilantes and the Washita County Council of Defense upon many of the Germans and Mennonites that lived in and around Corn. This was due to the combination of their German heritage and their particular Mennonite/Anabaptist theological convictions, which dictated their conscientious objection to participation in warfare. Not only did the town Americanize its name from Korn to Corn during this time, but the nearby Cordell Christian College closed and a German-language newspaper, the Oklahoma Vorwärts, ceased operation after threats from the Knights of Liberty.

=== Education ===
A private Christian academy, under the name Washita Gemeinde Schule, was established by the Mennonite Brethren Church as a Bible and language school in 1902. Now known as Corn Bible Academy, it has continuously educated students into the 21st century and is the oldest Christian school west of the Mississippi. As of 2016, it was serving grades 7–12.

In 1968, the public school of nearby Colony merged with the Corn public schools, forming the Washita Heights School District. On April 23, 2010, a referendum was held asking for voter approval to disband the increasingly small school district of Washita Heights, along with its school in Corn, due to the lack of students within the district and insufficient funding. The dissolution was approved and the nearby Cordell schools annexed the Washita Heights district.

== Demographics ==
Historical population
Census	Pop.	Note	%±
1960	317		—
1970	409		29.0%
1980	542		32.5%
1990	548		1.1%
2000	591		7.8%
2010	503		−14.9%
2020	592		17.7%
U.S. Decennial Census

=== 2020 census ===
As of the 2020 census, Corn had a population of 592. The median age was 55.7 years. 18.2% of residents were under the age of 18 and 37.2% of residents were 65 years of age or older. For every 100 females there were 78.9 males, and for every 100 females age 18 and over there were 73.5 males age 18 and over.

0.0% of residents lived in urban areas, while 100.0% lived in rural areas.

There were 176 households in Corn, of which 32.4% had children under the age of 18 living in them. Of all households, 55.7% were married-couple households, 14.2% were households with a male householder and no spouse or partner present, and 25.6% were households with a female householder and no spouse or partner present. About 23.9% of all households were made up of individuals and 11.9% had someone living alone who was 65 years of age or older.

There were 205 housing units, of which 14.1% were vacant. The homeowner vacancy rate was 2.3% and the rental vacancy rate was 21.7%.

Racial composition as of the 2020 census
Race	Number	Percent
White	504	85.1%
Black or African American	6	1.0%
American Indian and Alaska Native	6	1.0%
Asian	3	0.5%
Native Hawaiian and Other Pacific Islander	0	0.0%
Some other race	18	3.0%
Two or more races	55	9.3%
Hispanic or Latino (of any race)	65	11.0%

=== 2010 census ===
As of 2010, the Census Bureau reported 503 people, 188 households and 118 family households in the town. 93.6% of its population was white. 42.7% were male and 57.3% were female. The average household size was 2.22 and the average family size was 2.86 persons. The percent of the population 18 years and older was 84.9%, or 427 persons, while 37.8%, or 190 persons, were 65 years and older. The median age was 53.6 years.

=== 2000 census ===
As of the census of 2000, there were 591 people, 198 households, and 136 families residing in the town. The population density was 1,630.2 inhabitants per square mile (629.4/km^{2}). There were 226 housing units at an average density of 623.4 units per square mile (240.7 units/km^{2}). The racial makeup of the town was 91.71% European American, 0.34% African American, 1.86% Native American, 2.88% from other races, and 3.21% from two or more races. Hispanic or Latino of any race were 4.57% of the population.

There were 198 households, out of which 32.3% had children under the age of 18 living with them, 61.1% were married couples living together, 6.1% had a female householder with no husband present, and 31.3% were non-families. 30.3% of all households were made up of individuals, and 19.2% had someone living alone who was 65 years of age or older. The average household size was 2.52 and the average family size was 3.17.

In the town, the population was spread out, with 24.9% under the age of 18, 4.6% from 18 to 24, 21.8% from 25 to 44, 15.2% from 45 to 64, and 33.5% who were 65 years of age or older. The median age was 44 years. For every 100 females, there were 78.5 males. For every 100 females age 18 and over, there were 72.1 males.

The median income for a household in the town was $31,154, and the median income for a family was $33,281. Males had a median income of $23,750 compared o $18,750 for females. The per capita income for the town was $15,632. About 14.4% of families and 14.9% of the population were below the poverty line, including 21.1% of those under age 18 and 2.4% of those age 65 or over.

== Economy ==
Agriculture has been a primary base for Corn and the surrounding county. Crops include wheat, cotton, sorghum, barley, rye, and peanuts.
