= Aultman, Pennsylvania =

Unincorporated community in Pennsylvania, US

- Unincorporated community
- Location within Pennsylvania Location within the United States
- Coordinates: 40°33′50″N 79°15′39″W
- Country: United States
- State: Pennsylvania
- County: Indiana
- Township: Center
- Elevation: 1,115 ft (340 m)
- Time zone: UTC-5 (Eastern (EST))
  - Summer (DST): UTC-4 (EDT)
- ZIP code: 15713
- Area code: 724
- GNIS feature ID: 1168514

Aultman is an unincorporated community in Indiana County, Pennsylvania, United States. The community is located along Pennsylvania Route 286 7 miles (11 km) southwest of Indiana. Aultman had a post office until it closed on September 28, 2002; it still has its own ZIP code, 15713.
