= Heman, Illinois =

- Unincorporated community
- Location within Illinois Location within the United States
- Coordinates: 39°56′49″N 89°06′20″W
- Country: United States
- State: Illinois
- County: Macon
- Elevation: 614 ft (187 m)
- Time zone: UTC-6 (Central (CST))
  - Summer (DST): UTC-5 (CDT)
- Area code: 217
- GNIS feature ID: 422797

Heman is an unincorporated community in Illini Township, Macon County, Illinois, United States. The community is on Illinois Route 121 2.5 miles (4.0 km) west-northwest of Warrensburg.
