= Cobb Town, Wisconsin =

- Unincorporated community
- Location within Wisconsin Location within the United States
- Coordinates: 44°22′32″N 89°12′55″W
- Country: United States
- State: Wisconsin
- County: Waupaca
- Elevation: 935 ft (285 m)
- Time zone: UTC-6 (Central (CST))
  - Summer (DST): UTC-5 (CDT)
- ZIP codes: 54981
- Area codes: 715 & 534
- GNIS feature ID: 1563219

Cobb Town is an unincorporated community in the Town of Farmington, Waupaca County, Wisconsin, United States.

It is located approximately 2 miles (3.2 km) south of Sheridan, along the Ice Age Trail.
