= McDonald House =

McDonald House or McDonald Farm or variations may refer to:

== Locations ==
=== United States ===
==== Arkansas ====
- McDonald–Wait–Newton House, Little Rock, Arkansas, listed on the NRHP in Little Rock, Arkansas
- D. McDonald House, Smackover, Arkansas, listed on the NRHP in Union County, Arkansas
- Emmett McDonald House, McRae, Arkansas, listed on the NRHP in White County, Arkansas

==== California ====
- McDonald Mansion, also known as "Mabelton", Santa Rosa, California, listed on the NRHP in Sonoma County, California

==== Iowa ====
- McDonald House (Winterset, Iowa), listed on the NRHP in Madison County, Iowa

==== Kentucky ====
- Nash–McDonald House, Anchorage, Kentucky, NRHP-listed

==== Louisiana ====
- McDonald House (Minden, Louisiana), listed on the NRHP in Webster Parish, Louisiana

==== Nebraska ====
- Old McDonald Farm, Blair, Nebraska, listed on the NRHP in Washington County, Nebraska
- J.D. McDonald House, Fremont, Nebraska, listed on the NRHP in Dodge County, Nebraska

==== Nevada ====
- Irving McDonald House, Tonopah, Nevada, listed on the NRHP in Nye County, Nevada

==== New Mexico ====
- Austin–McDonald House, Aztec, New Mexico, listed on the NRHP in San Juan County, New Mexico

==== Ohio ====
- McDonald Farm (Xenia, Ohio), listed on the NRHP in Greene County, Ohio

==== South Dakota ====
- Henry M. McDonald House, Pierre, South Dakota, listed on the NRHP in Hughes County, South Dakota

==== Tennessee ====
- McDonald–Bolner House, Fayetteville, Tennessee, listed on the NRHP in Lincoln County, Tennessee

==== Texas ====
- McDonald Hall, Abilene, Texas, listed on the NRHP in Taylor County, Texas
- McKinney–McDonald House, Galveston, Texas, listed on the NRHP in Galveston County, Texas
- McDonald House (Houston, Texas), listed on the NRHP in Harris County, Texas
- Pace McDonald Site, Palestine, Texas, listed on the NRHP in Anderson County, Texas
- McDonald House (Victoria, Texas), listed on the NRHP in Victoria County, Texas

==== Utah ====
- David McDonald House, Salt Lake City, Utah, listed on the NRHP in Salt Lake County, Utah

==== Virginia ====
- Joseph McDonald Farm, Prices Fork, Virginia, listed on the NRHP in Montgomery County, Virginia
- Bryan McDonald Jr. House, Troutville, Virginia, listed on the NRHP in Botetourt County, Virginia

==== West Virginia ====
- Lee–Throckmorton–McDonald House, Inwood, West Virginia, NRHP-listed

=== Elsewhere ===
- MacDonald House, Singapore
  - Site of the MacDonald House bombing
- Macdonald House, London, former Canadian consular building in London
- Macdonald House, a historical home museum in Winnipeg, Canada, also known as Dalnavert

== Other ==
- Ronald McDonald House Charities
  - Ronald McDonald House New York
- New MacDonald's Farm, an Australian children's television program

== See also ==
- "Old MacDonald Had a Farm", children's song
