= National Register of Historic Places listings in Lincoln County, Tennessee =

Location of Lincoln County in Tennessee

This is a list of the National Register of Historic Places listings in Lincoln County, Tennessee.

This is intended to be a complete list of the properties and districts on the National Register of Historic Places in Lincoln County, Tennessee, United States. Latitude and longitude coordinates are provided for many National Register properties and districts; these locations may be seen together in a map.

There are 18 properties and districts listed on the National Register in the county.

Contents: Counties in Tennessee
Anderson – Bedford – Benton – Bledsoe – Blount – Bradley – Campbell – Cannon – Carroll – Carter – Cheatham – Chester – Claiborne – Clay – Cocke – Coffee – Crockett – Cumberland – Davidson – Decatur – DeKalb – Dickson – Dyer – Fayette – Fentress – Franklin – Gibson – Giles – Grainger – Greene – Grundy – Hamblen – Hamilton – Hancock – Hardeman – Hardin – Hawkins – Haywood – Henderson – Henry – Hickman – Houston – Humphreys – Jackson – Jefferson – Johnson – Knox – Lake – Lauderdale – Lawrence – Lewis – Lincoln – Loudon – Macon – Madison – Marion – Marshall – Maury – McMinn – McNairy – Meigs – Monroe – Montgomery – Moore – Morgan – Obion – Overton – Perry – Pickett – Polk – Putnam – Rhea – Roane – Robertson – Rutherford – Scott – Sequatchie – Sevier – Shelby – Smith – Stewart – Sullivan – Sumner – Tipton – Trousdale – Unicoi – Union – Van Buren – Warren – Washington – Wayne – Weakley – White – Williamson – Wilson

This National Park Service list is complete through NPS recent listings posted May 8, 2026.

== Current listings ==
| | Name on the Register | Image | Date listed | Location | City or town | Description |
|---|---|---|---|---|---|---|
| 1 | Borden Powdered Milk Plant | Borden Powdered Milk Plant | July 14, 1988 (#88001060) | S. Main St. 35°08′08″N 88°33′21″W | Fayetteville | |
| 2 | Childress House | Childress House | February 25, 1982 (#82003985) | 2618 Pulaski Hwy. 35°12′01″N 86°43′03″W | Fayetteville | |
| 3 | Isaac Conger House | Isaac Conger House | July 16, 1973 (#73001807) | 50 Hamestring Rd. 35°13′13″N 86°30′25″W | Fayetteville | |
| 4 | Hugh Bright Douglas House | Hugh Bright Douglas House | March 25, 1982 (#82003986) | 301 Elk Ave., N. 35°09′15″N 86°34′47″W | Fayetteville | |
| 5 | Greer-Gill Farm | | July 7, 2022 (#100007917) | 352 Gingerbread Rd. 35°17′41″N 86°35′57″W | Petersburg | |
| 6 | Harms Mill Hydroelectric Station | | July 5, 1990 (#90001007) | State Route 15 at the Elk River; 35°09′02″N 86°38′55″W | Fayetteville | |
| 7 | Harris-Holden House | Harris-Holden House | March 19, 1975 (#75001766) | 304 Daves Hollow Rd. 35°13′45″N 86°36′23″W | Howell | |
| 8 | Kelso Bowstring Arch Truss Bridge | | January 4, 1983 (#83003046) | North of Kelso on Stephens Creek Rd. 35°08′17″N 86°28′07″W | Kelso | |
| 9 | Lincoln County Poor House Farm | Lincoln County Poor House Farm | July 11, 1985 (#85001511) | 120 Poorhouse Rd. 35°03′59″N 86°40′46″W | Coldwater | |
| 10 | McDonald-Bolner House | McDonald-Bolner House | May 31, 1984 (#84003579) | 400 S. Elk; 35°08′57″N 86°34′10″W | Fayetteville | |
| 11 | Mimosa School | Mimosa School | July 28, 1983 (#83003047) | 464 Mimosa Rd. 35°13′31″N 86°31′12″W | Mimosa | |
| 12 | Mount Zion Missionary Baptist Church | Mount Zion Missionary Baptist Church | July 6, 2000 (#00000731) | 305 W. Maple St. 35°09′00″N 86°34′26″W | Fayetteville | |
| 13 | Mulbery-Washington-Lincoln Historic District | Mulbery-Washington-Lincoln Historic District | May 31, 1984 (#84003580) | Roughly Bright, Elk, Green, Main, Lincoln, Mulberry, and Washington Sts. 35°09′18″N 86°34′01″W | Fayetteville | |
| 14 | Petersburg Historic District | Petersburg Historic District | November 7, 1985 (#85002753) | Roughly bounded by Church, Railroad, and Gaunt Sts. and State Route 50; 35°19′03″N 86°38′19″W | Petersburg | Extends into Marshall County |
| 15 | St. Paul African Methodist Episcopal Church | St. Paul African Methodist Episcopal Church | October 3, 2003 (#03001003) | 521 W. College St. 35°09′11″N 86°34′39″W | Fayetteville | |
| 16 | South Elk Street Historic District | South Elk Street Historic District | July 12, 1989 (#89000127) | Roughly bounded by E. Campbell St., Franklin St., former L&N railroad tracks, and S. Elk St. 35°08′56″N 86°34′08″W | Fayetteville | |
| 17 | Toll Gate House | | May 11, 2026 (#100012988) | 118 Mimosa Road; 35°10′51″N 86°32′37″W | Fayetteville vicinity | |
| 18 | Whitaker-Motlow House | Whitaker-Motlow House | November 15, 2011 (#11000807) | 740 Lynchburg Hwy. 35°13′30″N 86°25′55″W | Mulberry | |

== See also ==
- List of National Historic Landmarks in Tennessee
- National Register of Historic Places listings in Tennessee
