= Whitaker House (disambiguation) =

Whitaker House is a Christian publishing corporation in New Kensington, Pennsylvania.

Whitaker House may also refer to the following places in the United States

- William Whitaker Landscape and House, Crown Point, Indiana, listed on the National Register of Historic Places (NRHP) in Lake County
- Charles Whitaker House (Davenport, Iowa), listed on the NRHP in Scott County
- Charles Whitaker House (Georgetown, Kentucky), listed on the NRHP in Scott County
- Kingsbury-Whitaker House, Needham, Massachusetts, listed on the NRHP in Norfolk County
- Whitaker-Clary House, New Salem, Massachusetts, listed on the NRHP in Franklin County
- Whitaker House (Benton, New York), listed on the NRHP in Yates County
- Rogers-Whitaker-Haywood House, Wake Crossroads, North Carolina, listed on the NRHP in Wake County
- Whitaker-Motlow House, Mulberry, Tennessee, listed on the NRHP in Lincoln County
- Whitaker House (Texarkana, Texas), listed on the NRHP in Bowie County
- Whitaker-McClendon House, Tyler, Texas, listed on the NRHP in Smith County
- John M. Whitaker House, Salt Lake City, Utah, listed on the NRHP in Salt Lake City
- Thomas and Elizabeth Mills Whitaker House, Centerville, Utah, listed on the NRHP in Davis County
- Echo Manor, also known as the Robert Whitaker House, in Raleigh, North Carolina
