= Charles Whitaker House =

Charles Whitaker House may refer to:

- Charles Whitaker House (Davenport, Iowa), listed on the National Register of Historic Places in Scott County, Iowa
- Charles Whitaker House (Georgetown, Kentucky), listed on the National Register of Historic Places in Scott County, Kentucky
