= Lamar Divens =

American football player (born 1985)

No. 96
- Position: Nose tackle

Personal information
- Born: November 12, 1985 (age 40); Fayetteville, Tennessee, U.S.
- Listed height: 6 ft 3 in (1.91 m)
- Listed weight: 340 lb (154 kg)

Career information
- High school: Lincoln Co. (Fayetteville)
- College: Tennessee State
- NFL draft: 2008: undrafted

Career history
- San Diego Chargers (2008)*; Baltimore Ravens (2008–2010); Tampa Bay Buccaneers (2011)*; Tennessee Titans (2012)*; San Francisco 49ers (2012–2013)*
- * Offseason or practice squad member only
- Stats at Pro Football Reference

Lamar Divens (born November 12, 1985) is an American former professional football player who was a nose tackle in the National Football League (NFL). He played college football first for the Vanderbilt Commodores, but later transferred to the Tennessee State Tigers.

He was signed by the San Diego Chargers as an undrafted free agent in 2008. His five appearances in National Football League (NFL) games were all with the Baltimore Ravens: three in 2008 and two in 2010. He was also a member of the Tampa Bay Buccaneers practice squad in 2011. Divens spent the 2012 offseason with the Tennessee Titans, but did not make the team when they cut down to 53 players for the regular season. He then spent the 2013 offseason with the San Francisco 49ers before getting injured and being released with an injury settlement.
