= Eddie Blake (American football) =

American gridiron football player (born 1969)

No. 66
- Position: Offensive guard

Personal information
- Born: December 18, 1969 (age 56); Fayetteville, Tennessee, U.S.
- Listed height: 6 ft 3 in (1.91 m)
- Listed weight: 321 lb (146 kg)

Career information
- High school: Fayetteville (TN) Lincoln Co.
- College: Auburn
- NFL draft: 1992: 2nd round, 43rd overall pick

Career history
- Miami Dolphins (1992–1993); Green Bay Packers (1994)*; Winnipeg Blue Bombers (1996); New York CityHawks (1998); New England Sea Wolves (2000); Winnipeg Blue Bombers (2000)
- * Offseason or practice squad member only

Awards and highlights
- First-team All-SEC (1991)

Career CFL statistics
- Games played: 11
- Stats at ArenaFan.com

Robert Edward Blake (born December 18, 1969) is an American former professional football player who was an offensive guard in the National Football League (NFL) for the Miami Dolphins. He also was a member of the Winnipeg Blue Bombers in the Canadian Football League (CFL). He played college football for the Auburn Tigers.

== Early life ==
Blake attended Lincoln County High School, where he played defensive tackle. His brother Ricky Blake was one of his teammates.

He enrolled at Northwest Mississippi Community College. He played offensive tackle and was a two-time first-team J.C. Gridwire. He transferred to Auburn University after his sophomore season.

He played mostly at offensive guard, switching to defensive tackle in short-yardage situations. He was the first Auburn two-way player in 14 years. He received All-SEC honors as a senior.

== Professional career ==
Blake was selected by the Miami Dolphins in the second round (43rd overall) of the 1992 NFL draft. Although he was mostly an offensive lineman in college, he was selected with the intention of converting him into a nose tackle for the Dolphins' 3-4 defense. He suffered a broken bone in his left foot by dropping a 45-pound weight in April before the NFL draft. He was placed on the physically unable to perform list on July 19, 1992. He was waived on August 26 and placed on the injured reserve list. On November 6, he suffered a tear of his medial collateral ligament and was lost for the year.

In 1993, he was moved back to offensive guard, to compete for the right guard starting position. He suffered a sprained knee in July, that slowed his progress. He was declared inactive in all of the games during the regular season. He was released on July 25, 1994, after the Dolphins signed free agent offensive guard Houston Hoover.

On July 28, 1994, he was signed as a free agent by the Green Bay Packers. He was released on August 9.

On November 14, 1995, he was signed by the Winnipeg Blue Bombers of the Canadian Football League. He appeared in 9 games during the 1996 season.

== Personal life ==
His older brother Ricky Blake, played running back in the NFL and CFL.
