= Hugh Bright Douglas House =

Historic house in Tennessee, United States

- U.S. National Register of Historic Places
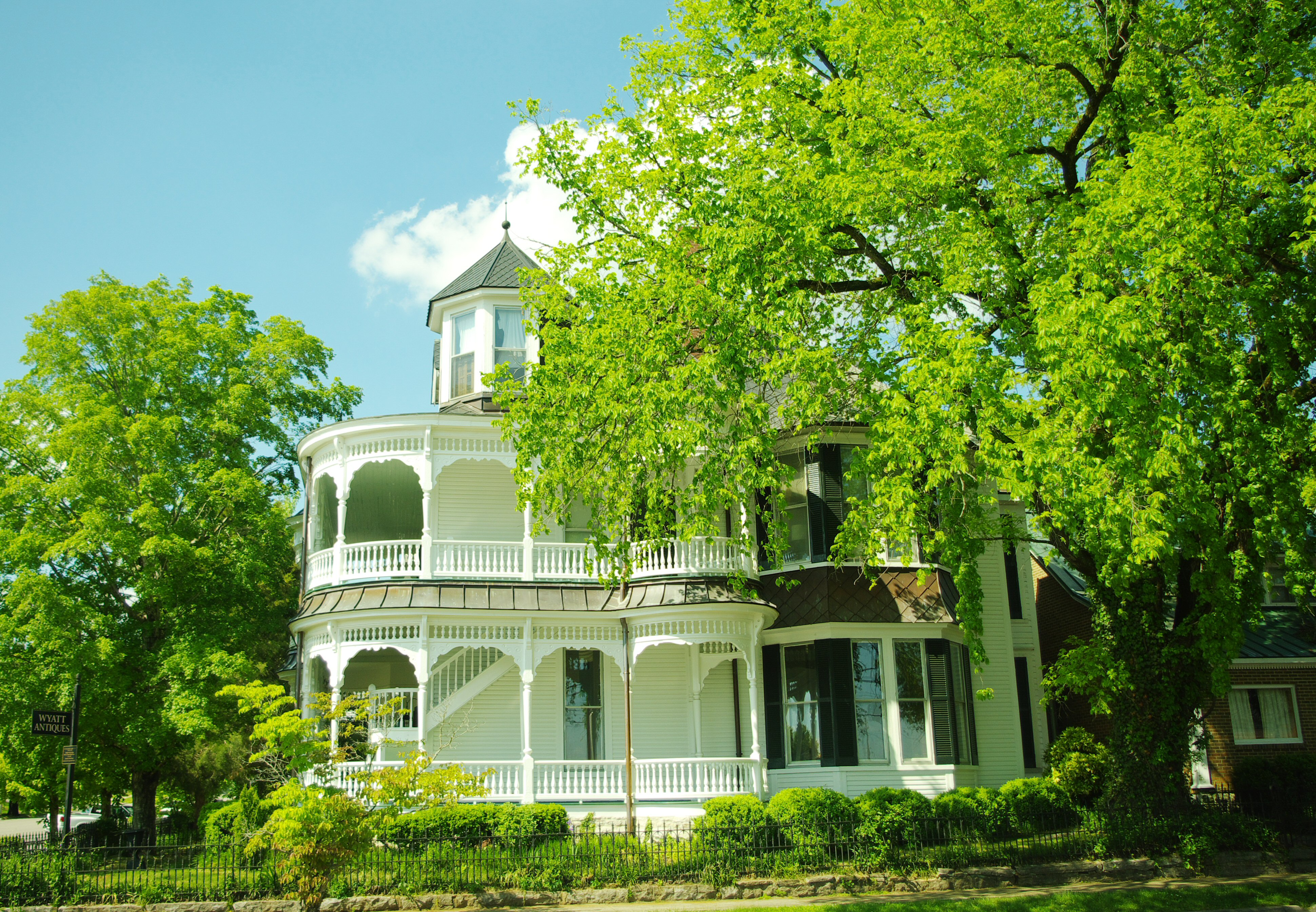
- The house in 2015

- Location within Tennessee
- Location: 301 Elk Avenue, North, Fayetteville, Tennessee
- Coordinates: 35°09′15″N 86°34′47″W
- Area: less than one acre
- Built: 1894
- Architect: Rickman & Bills
- Architectural style: Late Victorian, Steamboat Gothic
- NRHP reference No.: 82003986
- Added to NRHP: March 25, 1982

The Hugh Bright Douglas House is a historic house in Fayetteville, Tennessee. It was built in 1894 for a Confederate veteran. It is listed on the National Register of Historic Places.

== History ==
The house was built in 1894 for Hugh Bright Douglas, the grandson of settler James Bright. During the American Civil War of 1861–1865, Douglas joined the Confederate States Army and served under generals Nathan Bedford Forrest and Joseph Wheeler. Douglas lived here with his wife, née Margaret Terrett, and their son, Byrd Douglas. It was inherited by his granddaughter, Sarah Byrd Douglas Posey, in 1958, and sold out of the family in 1961.

== Architectural significance ==
The house was designed by Rickman & Bills in the Steamboat Gothic architectural style. It has been listed on the National Register of Historic Places since March 25, 1982.
