= Isaac Conger House =

Historic house in Tennessee, United States

- U.S. National Register of Historic Places
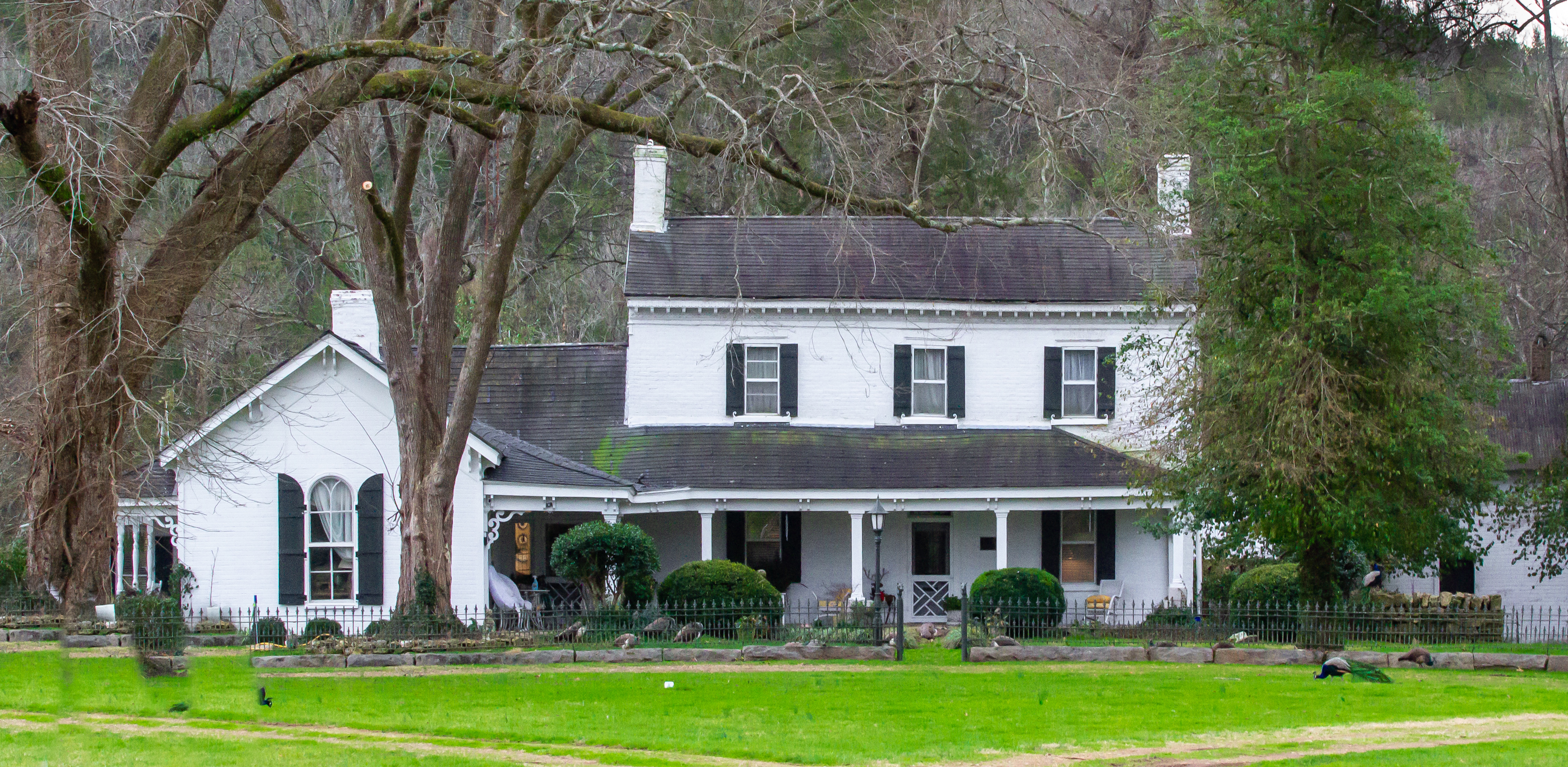

- Location within Tennessee
- Interactive map showing the location for Isaac Conger House
- Location: 50 Hamestring Rd.
- Nearest city: Fayetteville, Tennessee
- Coordinates: 35°13′13″N 86°30′25″W
- Area: 9 acres (3.6 ha)
- Built: 1808
- Architectural style: Federal
- NRHP reference No.: 73001807
- Added to NRHP: July 16, 1973

The Isaac Conger House is a historic house in Fayetteville, Tennessee. It was built in 1808 for the Conger family. It is listed on the National Register of Historic Places.

== History ==
The house was built in 1808 for Isaac Conger, a settler from North Carolina, and his wife, née Mary Moore. Conger was a Methodist minister, and the couple were cousins. After his death, the house was inherited by his son Sion Conger, who lived here with his wife, née Beall Norton, and their four sons. It was later inherited by one of his sons, Dixie Conger, a mule trader who lived here with his wife, née Mary Shofner, and their five children. By the 1980s, the house still belonged to the Conger family.

== Architectural significance ==
The house was designed in the Federal architectural style. It has been listed on the National Register of Historic Places since July 16, 1973.
