= Ricky Blake =

American football player (born 1967)

No. 46
- Position: Running back

Personal information
- Born: July 15, 1967 (age 59); Fayetteville, Tennessee, U.S.
- Listed height: 6 ft 2 in (1.88 m)
- Listed weight: 244 lb (111 kg)

Career information
- High school: Lincoln County (Fayetteville)
- College: Northwest Mississippi
- NFL draft: 1991: undrafted

Career history
- Winnipeg Blue Bombers (1989); San Antonio Riders (1991); Winnipeg Blue Bombers (1991)*; Dallas Cowboys (1991–1992); Seattle Seahawks (1993)*; Fort Worth Cavalry (1994); Barcelona Dragons (1995); St. Louis Rams (1996)*; Colorado Wildcats (2002–2016)
- * Offseason or practice squad member only

Awards and highlights
- NJCAA All-American (1987); All-World League (1991)

Career NFL statistics
- Games played: 2
- Stats at Pro Football Reference
- Stats at ArenaFan.com

Ricky Darnell Blake (born July 15, 1967) is an American former professional football player who was a running back in the National Football League (NFL) for the Dallas Cowboys. He also was a member of the Winnipeg Blue Bombers, San Antonio Riders, Fort Worth Cavalry and Barcelona Dragons. He played college football at Northwest Mississippi Community College.

== Early life ==
Blake attended Lincoln County High School, where he played running back. He graduated as the school's All-time leading rusher.

He enrolled at Northwest Mississippi Community College. As a sophomore in 1987, he set a school record by averaging 166.7 rushing yards-per-game during the season, receiving first-team NJCAA All-American honors.

He transferred to Alabama A&M University, but left before the start of the 1988 season, after the football coaching staff was fired.

== Professional career ==
In 1989, he was signed as a free agent by the Winnipeg Blue Bombers of the Canadian Football League. He did not play until the 11th game against the BC Lions, tallying 20 carries for 92 yards. He then started all six of the games he played over the final eight weeks of the season. In the 14th game against the Edmonton Eskimos, he registered 17 carries for 107 yards. He finished second on the team behind Tim Jessie, with 81 carries for 354 yards (4.4-yard avg.) and one touchdown.

Blake injured an ankle before the start of the 1990 season, and due to a limit on the number of American players on the team rosters, he never regained his job.

In 1990, he played for a semi-professional football team in Oklahoma City. In 1991, he played in the inaugural season of the World League of American Football. He was the starting running back for the San Antonio Riders. He appeared in 9 games, finishing third in the league with 554 rushing yards. He set a single-game league record with 140 rushing yards against the Raleigh–Durham Skyhawks on April 15. He also was the first running back in the league to wear the helmet camera, which was worn by the quarterbacks. He was given the nickname "Amtrak" because of his running style, finishing with 120 carries for 554 yards (4.6-yard avg.) and 5 touchdowns.

In 1991, he spent two weeks in the Winnipeg Blue Bombers training camp, before leaving for the NFL.

On July 18, 1991, he was signed as a free agent by the Dallas Cowboys. He spent the first 4 weeks of the season on the injured reserve list with a neck injury. He was activated on September 25 to be the backup behind Emmitt Smith. He had six carries for 38 yards against the Cincinnati Bengals, including a 30-yard touchdown run on his first NFL carry. Against the Phoenix Cardinals, he posted a season-high nine carries for 42 yards, but suffered a career-threatening right hip fracture (he sheared the leg bone from the hip socket) on the last play of the game. He was placed on the injured reserve list, finishing with 15 carries for 80 yards (second on the team), a 5.3-yard average (led the team) and one touchdown. In 1992, he missed the first 6 games of the season, because his broken hip was not fully healed. On October 19, he was waived after not being able to regain his previous form and his comeback attempt was also complicated by thyroid problems.

In 1993, he signed with the Seattle Seahawks. He was released on August 26.

In 1994, he signed with the Fort Worth Cavalry of the Arena Football League, to play as a fullback/linebacker. He was a backup player, rushing 4 times for 12 yards (3.0-yard avg.) and had one tackle.

In 1995, he played for the Barcelona Dragons in the World League of American Football. In 1996, he was selected by the Dragons, but did not make the team.

In 1996, he was signed by the St. Louis Rams as a free agent. He was released in August.

From 2002 to 2016, he played for the Colorado Wildcats in the Federal Indoor Football League. He finished as the league's leader, in rushing yards, attempts, touchdowns, all-purpose yardage, scoring (non kicker) as well as receptions and receiving yardage by a running back. He was named to the National Conference All Pro Team in 6 consecutive seasons (2004-2009). He received the league MVP Award in 2006. He contributed to the team having 2 consecutive FIFL Bowl wins (2005 and 2006) and was the FIFL Bowl MVP in 2006. He was named Offensive Player of the Game 48 times and Offensive Player of the Week 7 times.

== Personal life ==
His younger brother Eddie Blake, played offensive guard and was selected by the Miami Dolphins in the second round the 1992 NFL draft. Eddie also was a member of the Winnipeg Blue Bombers of the Canadian Football League.
