= Childress House =

Historic house in Tennessee, United States

- U.S. National Register of Historic Places
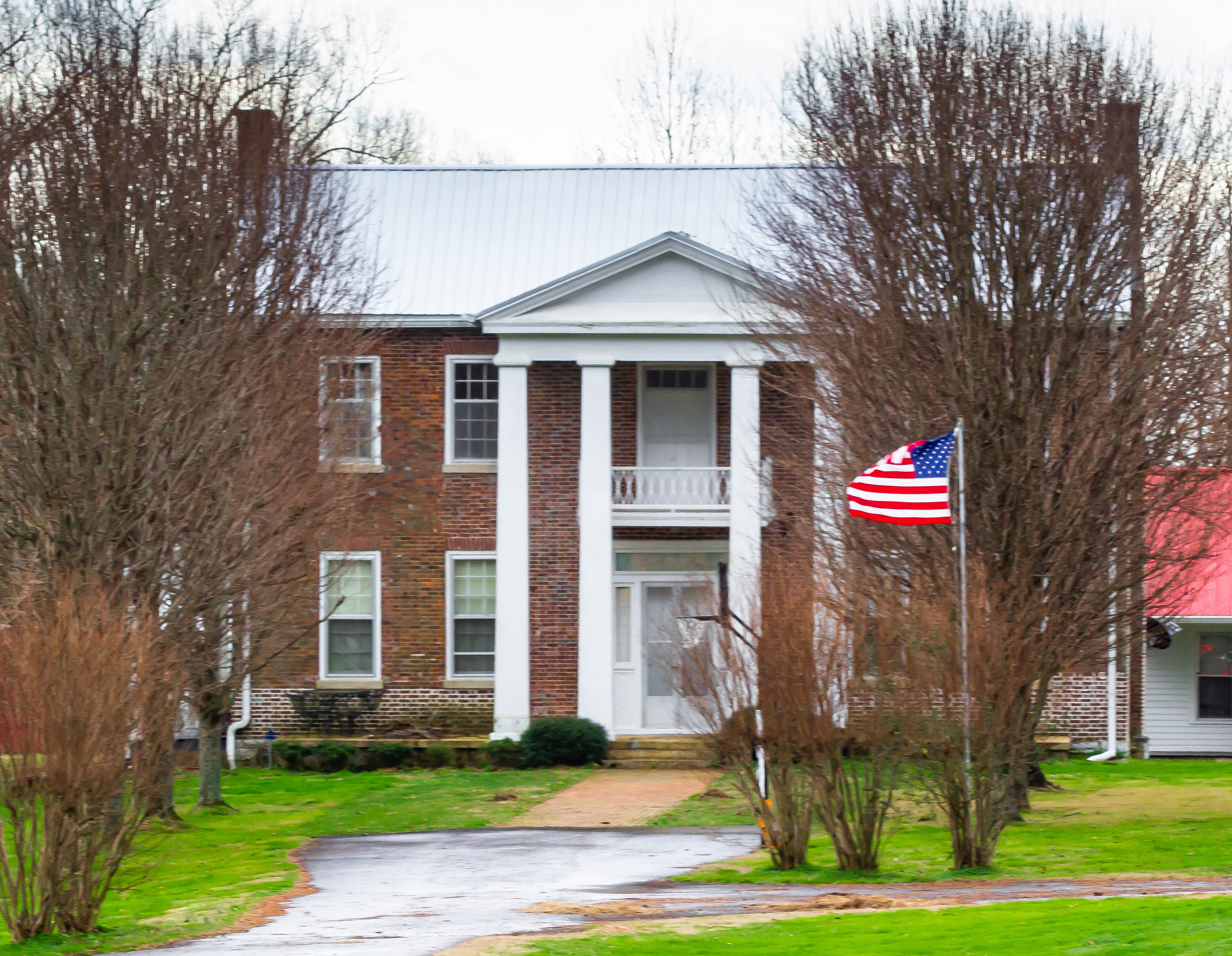

- Location within Tennessee
- Location: 2618 Pulaski Hwy.
- Nearest city: Fayetteville, Tennessee
- Coordinates: 35°12′01″N 86°43′03″W
- Area: 1 acre (0.40 ha)
- Built: 1825
- NRHP reference No.: 82003985
- Added to NRHP: February 25, 1982

The Childress House is a historic house in Fayetteville, Tennessee. It was built for the Childress family in the 1820s. It is listed on the National Register of Historic Places.

== History ==
The house was built in 1825 for Reps Osborne Childress, a settler whose father had received a land grant for his service in the American Revolutionary War. Childress had a wife, Sarah, and eight children. After his death, the house was inherited by his son Marion Childress, who served as a major during the American Civil War. By the 1980s, it belonged to a descendant of the Childress family, Fred M. Lamon Jr.

== Architectural significance ==
The portico, with two columns, was built in the 1840s. The house has been listed on the National Register of Historic Places since February 25, 1982.
