= Anthony Shelton =

American gridiron football player (born 1967)

No. 23
- Position: Defensive back

Personal information
- Born: September 4, 1967 (age 59); Fayetteville, Tennessee, U.S.
- Listed height: 6 ft 1 in (1.85 m)
- Listed weight: 195 lb (88 kg)

Career information
- High school: Lincoln (Fayetteville)
- College: Tennessee State
- NFL draft: 1990: 11th round, 289th overall pick

Career history
- San Francisco 49ers (1990)*; San Diego Chargers (1990–1992); Winnipeg Blue Bombers (1994); Shreveport Pirates (1994); Winnipeg Blue Bombers (1995)*; Shreveport Pirates (1995); Hamilton Tiger-Cats (1996)*
- * Offseason or practice squad member only

Career NFL statistics
- Interceptions: 1
- Sacks: 1
- Stats at Pro Football Reference

Anthony Levala Shelton (born September 4, 1967) is an American former professional football player who was a defensive back for two seasons with the San Diego Chargers of the National Football League (NFL). He was selected by the San Francisco 49ers in the eleventh round of the 1990 NFL draft after playing college football for the Tennessee State Tigers. Shelton also played for the Winnipeg Blue Bombers and Shreveport Pirates of the Canadian Football League (CFL).

== Early life and college ==
Anthony Levala Shelton was born on September 4, 1967, in Fayetteville, Tennessee. He played high school football at Lincoln County High School in Fayetteville from 1982 to 1984. Lincoln County High had a 31–5 record during his three seasons there and won the state title in 1982. Shelton earned All-District honors as both a junior and senior. In 2014, he was inducted into Lincoln County High's Falcon Football Hall of Fame.

Shelton played college football for the Tigers of Tennessee State University.

== Professional career ==
Shelton was selected by the San Francisco 49ers in the 11th round, with the 289th overall pick, of the 1990 NFL draft. He officially signed with the team on July 26. He was waived by the 49ers on September 3, 1990.

Shelton was claimed off waivers by the San Diego Chargers on September 4, 1990. He played in 14 games for the Chargers during the 1990 season. He appeared in 11 games, starting four, in 1991, recording one interception and one sack. Shelton was placed on injured reserve on November 30, 1991, due to a sore shoulder. He became a free agent after the 1991 season and re-signed with the team on July 16, 1992. He was placed on injured reserve again in August 1992 and missed the entire season. Wilson was released by the Chargers on August 24, 1993.

Shelton signed with the Winnipeg Blue Bombers of the Canadian Football League in May 1994. He dressed in five games for the Blue Bombers during the 1994 CFL season, totaling nine defensive tackles, seven special teams tackles, one interception, and one pass breakup.

On August 31, 1994, it was reported that Shelton had been "transferred" to the Shreveport Pirates as part of a "lend-lease program." He dressed in ten games for the Pirates in 1994, recording 29 defensive tackles, 15 special teams tackles, one interception, and four pass breakups.

After the 1994 season ended, Shelton, who reportedly wanted to stay in Shreveport, was transferred back to the Blue Bombers per the terms of the lend-lease deal. He was released by Winnipeg on June 5, 1995.

Shelton then signed with the Pirates in June 1995. He dressed in 17 games during the 1995 season, accumulating 64 defensive tackles, ten special teams tackles, two interceptions, two pass breakups, and two sacks. The Pirates folded after the season.

On March 7, 1996, Shelton was selected by the Hamilton Tiger-Cats with the 115th overall pick of the 1996 CFL Dispersal Draft. He was released by the Tiger-Cats on June 14, 1996.
