= Harris-Holden House =

Historic house in Tennessee, United States

- U.S. National Register of Historic Places
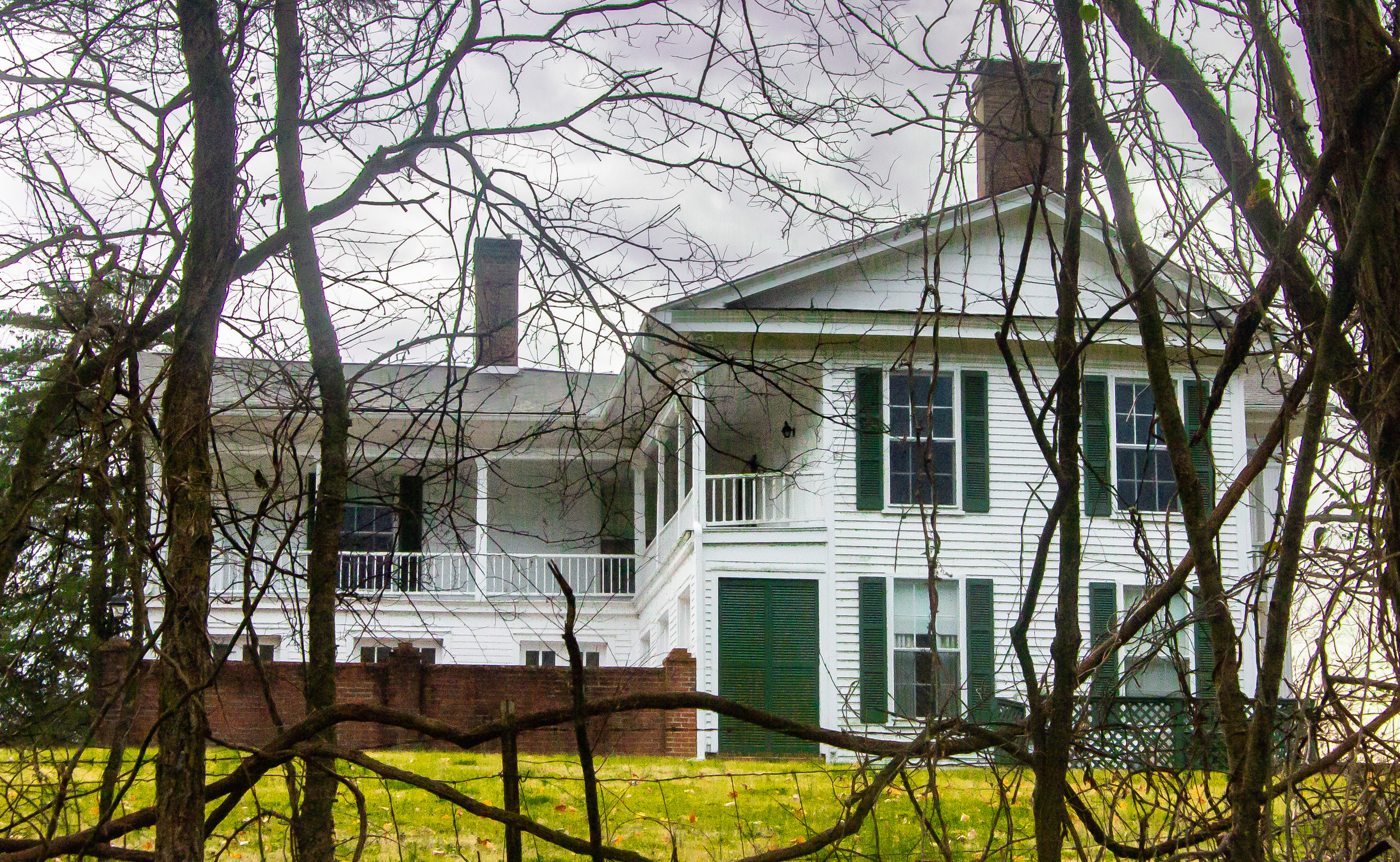

- Location within Tennessee
- Location: 304 Daves Hollow Rd.
- Nearest city: Howell, Tennessee
- Coordinates: 35°13′53″N 86°36′07″W
- Area: 8 acres (3.2 ha)
- Built: 1860
- NRHP reference No.: 75001766
- Added to NRHP: March 19, 1975

The Harris-Holden House is a historic house on a former plantation in Lincoln County, Tennessee. It was built in 1860 for Joel M. Harris, a planter and slaveholder. During the American Civil War of 1861–1865, the Union Army looked for victuals in the house. In 1901, Harris took to sheep farming, but dogs ate his herd. Harris died in 1914, and the remaining slave cabins on the property were demolished in 1920. By the 1970s, the house belonged to the Holden family. It has been listed on the National Register of Historic Places since March 19, 1975.
