= Northwest Mississippi Community College =

Public college in Senatobia, Mississippi, US

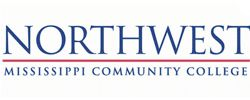
- Type: Public community college
- Established: September 7, 1926
- President: Michael J. Heindl
- Faculty: 468
- Students: 6,800
- Location: Senatobia, Mississippi, United States; 34.3663°N 89.5368°W
- Campus: Rural 251+ acres
- Nickname: Rangers
- Website: www.northwestms.edu

Northwest Mississippi Community College is a public community college in Senatobia, Mississippi. It was founded in 1926. As of 2024, Northwest's enrollment is approximately 7,800 students. There are approximately 2,000 students on the Senatobia campus—1,300 of which reside in the college's residence halls. Approximately 750 students are enrolled at the DeSoto Center in Southaven, Mississippi, and nearly 400 are enrolled at the Lafayette-Yalobusha Center in Oxford, Mississippi. Nearly 1,200 Northwest students are dual-credit high school students earning college credit from Northwest while completing their diplomas at area high schools.

One of fifteen state community and junior colleges in Mississippi, Northwest is on a 247-acre (1.00 km^{2}) main campus in Senatobia with satellite campuses in Southaven and Oxford. The college is accredited by the Southern Association of Colleges and Schools to award the Associate of Arts and Associate of Applied Science degrees along with professional career certificates. The Northwest campus has 43 buildings, many built or renovated in the last decade. Northwest's district covers Benton, Calhoun, Desoto, Lafayette, Marshall, Panola, Quitman, Tallahatchie, Tate, Tunica, and Yalobusha counties in northwest Mississippi.

== History ==
Northwest began as Tate County Agricultural High School in 1915. The College began in 1928 with support from Tate and Quitman counties and the Mississippi Junior College Commission. The first President was Porter Walker Berry.

The school changed with the times. Depression era students were allowed to pay for room and board with produce, and World War II male students studied at an accelerated pace to join the war effort. The Southern Association of Colleges and Schools gave accreditation to Northwest in 1953. Effective January 2, 1988, the institution changed its name from Northwest Mississippi Junior College to Northwest Mississippi Community College.

The college serves an eleven county district and gradually expanded its offerings. Today, Internet classes, noncredit classes, and non-traditional offerings for adults round out the modern campus.

== Campus ==
The main campus sits on 247 acres (1.00 km^{2}) in Senatobia, Mississippi. Yalobusha Hall, renovated in 2000, holds several offices, including the Registrar, Admissions, Financial Aid, and Recruiting offices. The James P. McCormick Administration Building, site of the original primary building for the old Tate County Agricultural High School, holds the administrative offices of the president, other officers, and the Business Office. The McCormick Building was named a Mississippi Landmark in 1993.

The DeSoto Center campus is situated on a 47-acre (19 ha) site in Southaven, Mississippi. The site was donated by the W. E. Ross family. The post-modern 2 1/2-story steel frame features a glass-and-steel tower that forms the atrium/commons. The building contains 28 classrooms, four computer labs, a practical nursing lab, and two science labs. DeSoto County is also the home of the Olive Branch, Mississippi career-technical campus, established in 1985.

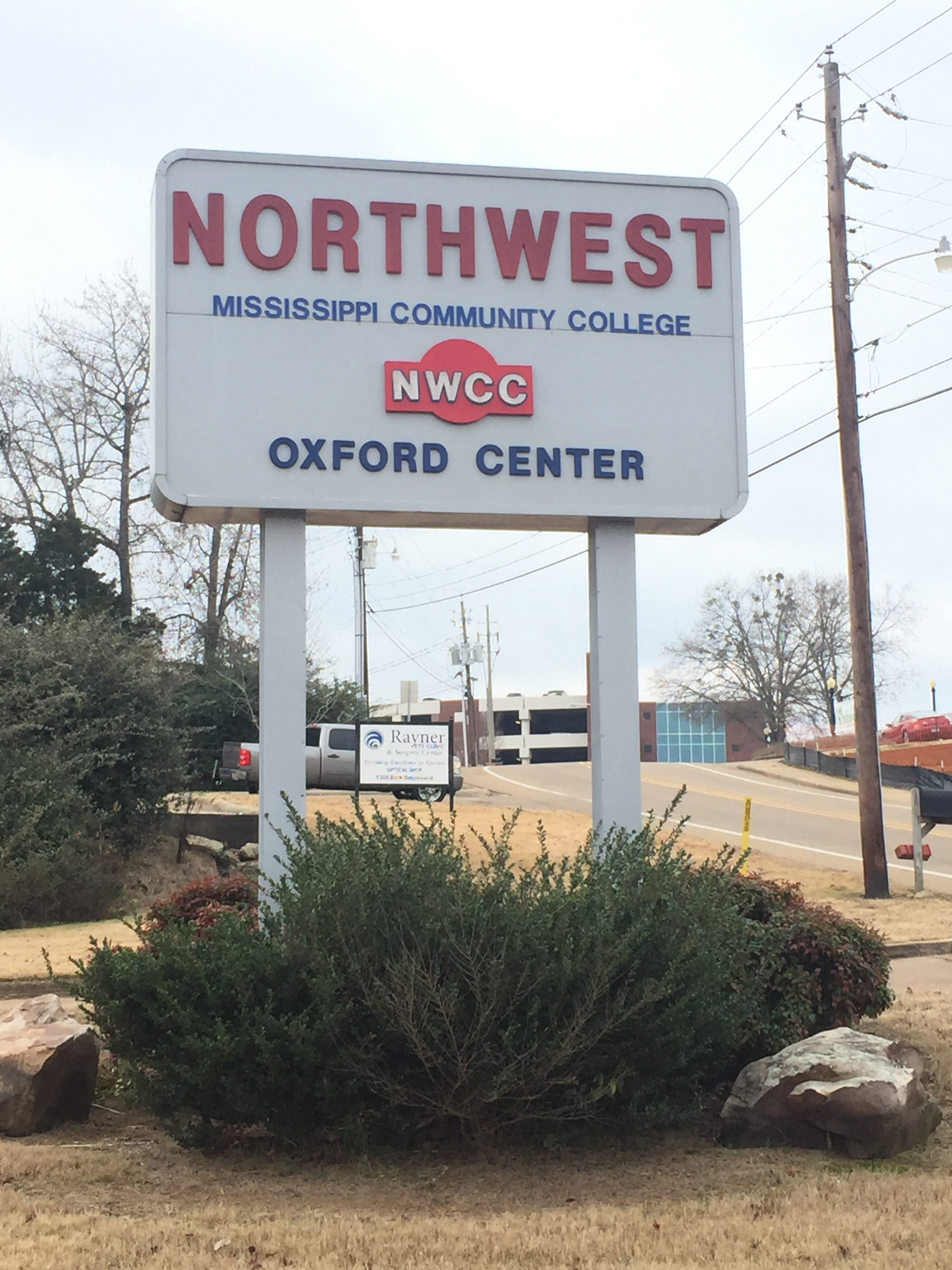
Oxford Campus

The Lafayette-Yalobusha Technical Center at Oxford, Mississippi, open in 1983, offers a science lab with internet capable lab stations for viewing dissections. The center also uses Dynamic Human software for health education.

== Academics ==
Northwest offers classes to prepare students for further academic achievement or for career advancement. Northwest has an "open door" policy for admissions. The Registrar's Office requires that potential students complete the following steps:

- Have completed and turned in an application.
- An official copy of SAT or ACT scores—ACT scores are required for Mississippi students.
- An official copy of a transcript from an accredited high school that includes a graduation date; or an official copy of GED scores; or an official copy of college or military transcript(s) from all colleges attended; or if attending another college full-time and attending Northwest part-time, attending an evening class or during a summer semester, a letter of good standing from the full-time college attended.

Degrees offered

- Associate of Arts
- Associate of Applied Science
- Certificate

== Student life ==
There are over 30 student organizations that offer diverse experiences and provide opportunities to compete for awards and scholarships. Leisure activities include pep rallies, cookouts, a workout center, swimming, dancing, and free movies and concerts.

== Athletics ==
Northwest athletic teams are the Rangers. The college offers sports programs in football, soccer, softball, baseball, men's basketball, women's basketball, rodeo, and golf.

== Notable alumni ==
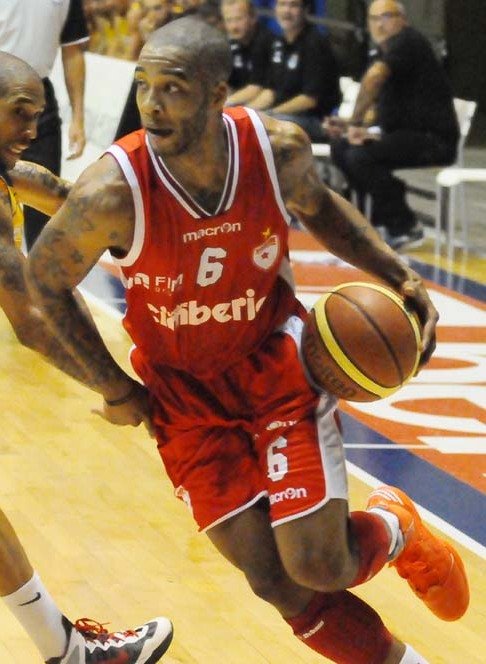
Adrian Banks

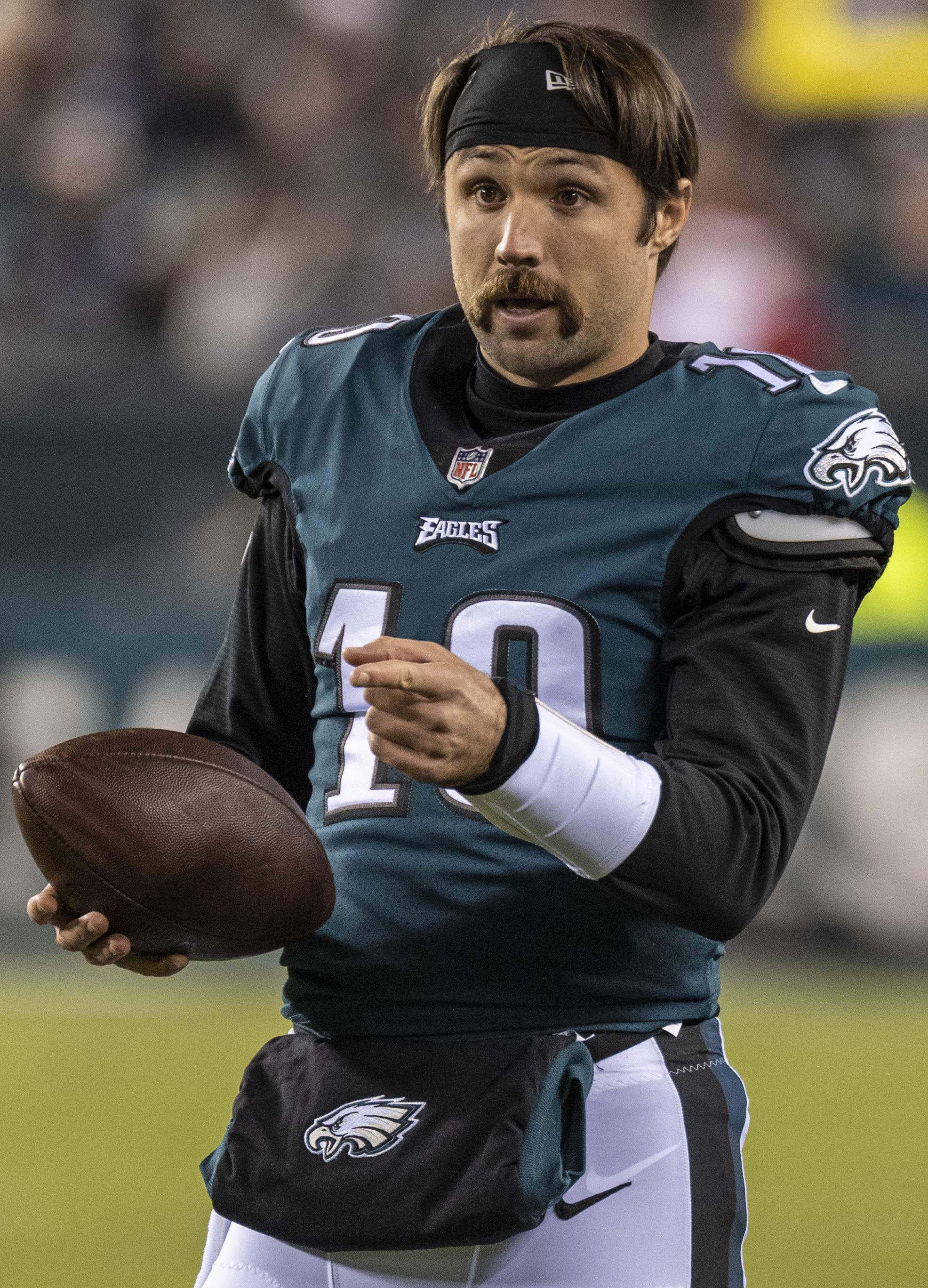
Gardner Minshew

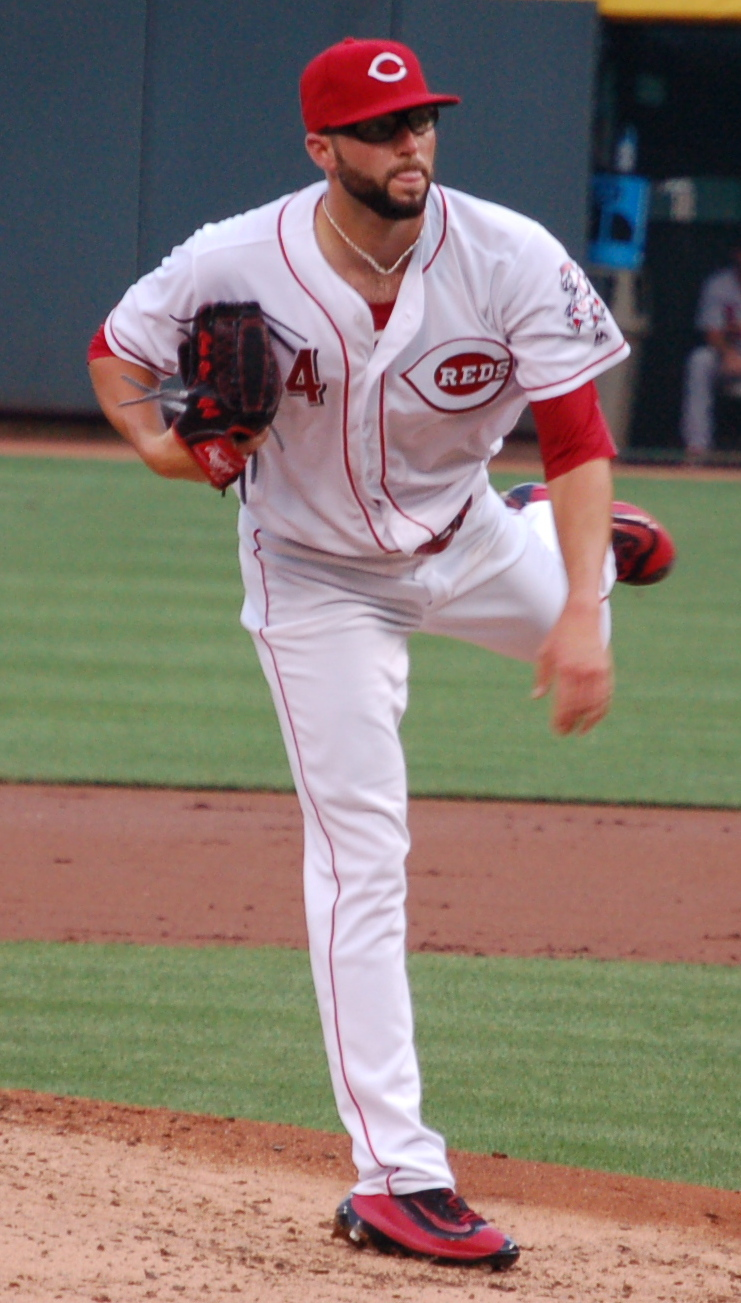
Cody Reed

- John Avery, professional football player
- Adrian Banks, American-Israeli basketball player for Hapoel Tel Aviv of the Israeli Basketball Super League
- Jeff Blackshear, professional football player
- Willie Blade, professional football player
- Eddie Blake, professional football player
- Ricky Blake, professional football player
- Eldra Buckley, professional football player
- Leonard Burton, professional football player
- Wesley Carroll, professional football player
- Kory Chapman, professional football player
- Treston Decoud, professional football player
- Hugh Freeze, football coach
- Dan Footman, professional football player
- John Grisham, author, lawyer and politician
- Damon Harrison, professional football player
- Roy Hart, professional football player
- Donald Hawkins, professional football player
- Bill Houston, professional football player
- Cletidus Hunt, professional football player
- Jacoby Jones, professional football player
- Germany Kent, media personality
- Cortez Kennedy, professional football player
- Will Hall, football coach
- Gardner Minshew, professional football player
- Bryant Mix, professional football player
- Alton Montgomery, professional football player
- Ronnie Musgrove, politician who served as the 29th Lieutenant Governor and the 62nd Governor of Mississippi
- Karl Oliver, Mississippi state representative for District 46
- Gerald Perry, professional football player
- Roell Preston, professional football player
- Cody Reed, professional baseball pitcher
- Bill Selby, professional baseball player
- Eric Smith (wide receiver), professional football player
- Daniel Thomas, professional football player
- Fred Thomas, professional football player
- Patrick Trahan, professional football player
- Colston Weatherington, professional football player
- Leonard Wheeler, professional football player
- Gizmo Williams, professional football player
- Elise Varner Winter, First Lady of Mississippi
