= Leonard Burton =

American football player (born 1964)

No. 61, 68
- Position: Center

Personal information
- Born: June 18, 1964 (age 62); Memphis, Tennessee, U.S.
- Listed height: 6 ft 3 in (1.91 m)
- Listed weight: 275 lb (125 kg)

Career information
- High school: Oakhaven (Memphis)
- College: Northwest Mississippi JC; South Carolina
- NFL draft: 1986: 3rd round, 77th overall pick

Career history
- Buffalo Bills (1986–1990); Cleveland Browns (1991); Detroit Lions (1992)

Career NFL statistics
- Games played: 60
- Games started: 9
- Stats at Pro Football Reference

Leonard Bernard Burton (born June 18, 1964) is an American former professional football player who was a center for five seasons in the National Football League (NFL) with the Buffalo Bills and Detroit Lions. He was selected by the Bills in the third round of the 1986 NFL draft. He played college football at Northwest Mississippi Junior College and the University of South Carolina.

== Early life and college ==
Leonard Bernard Burton was born on June 18, 1964, in Memphis, Tennessee. He attended Oakhaven High School in Memphis.

Burton first played college football at Northwest Mississippi Junior College from 1982 to 1983. He was then a two-year letterman for the South Carolina Gamecocks of the University of South Carolina from 1984 to 1985.

== Professional career ==
Burton was selected by the Buffalo Bills in the third round, with the 77th overall pick, of the 1986 NFL draft. He officially signed with the team on July 24, 1986. He played in 14 games for the Bills during his rookie year in 1986. Burton was placed on injured reserve on December 17, 1986. He played in 12 games, starting three, in 1987. He appeared in all 16 games, starting four, during the 1988 season. He also played in two playoff games that year as well. Burton appeared in all 16 games for the second consecutive year in 1989 and also played in one postseason contest. He spent the entire 1990 season on injured reserve and became a free agent after the season. He re-signed with the Bills but was later released on August 26, 1991.

Burton signed with the Cleveland Browns on September 3, 1991. He was placed on injured reserve on October 10, 1991, before playing in any games for the Browns. He became a free agent after the 1991 season and re-signed with the Browns before being released on July 10, 1992.

Burton was signed by the Detroit Lions on July 27, 1992. He was released on August 31 but later re-signed on October 18, 1992. He played in two games, both starts, for the Lions that year before being placed on injured reserve. Burton became a free agent again after the 1992 season and re-signed with the Lions on April 23, 1993. He was released on August 30, re-signed the next day, and released again on September 3, 1993. He signed with the Lions again on April 29, 1994, but was later released for the final time.
