= Lincoln County Poor House Farm =

- U.S. National Register of Historic Places
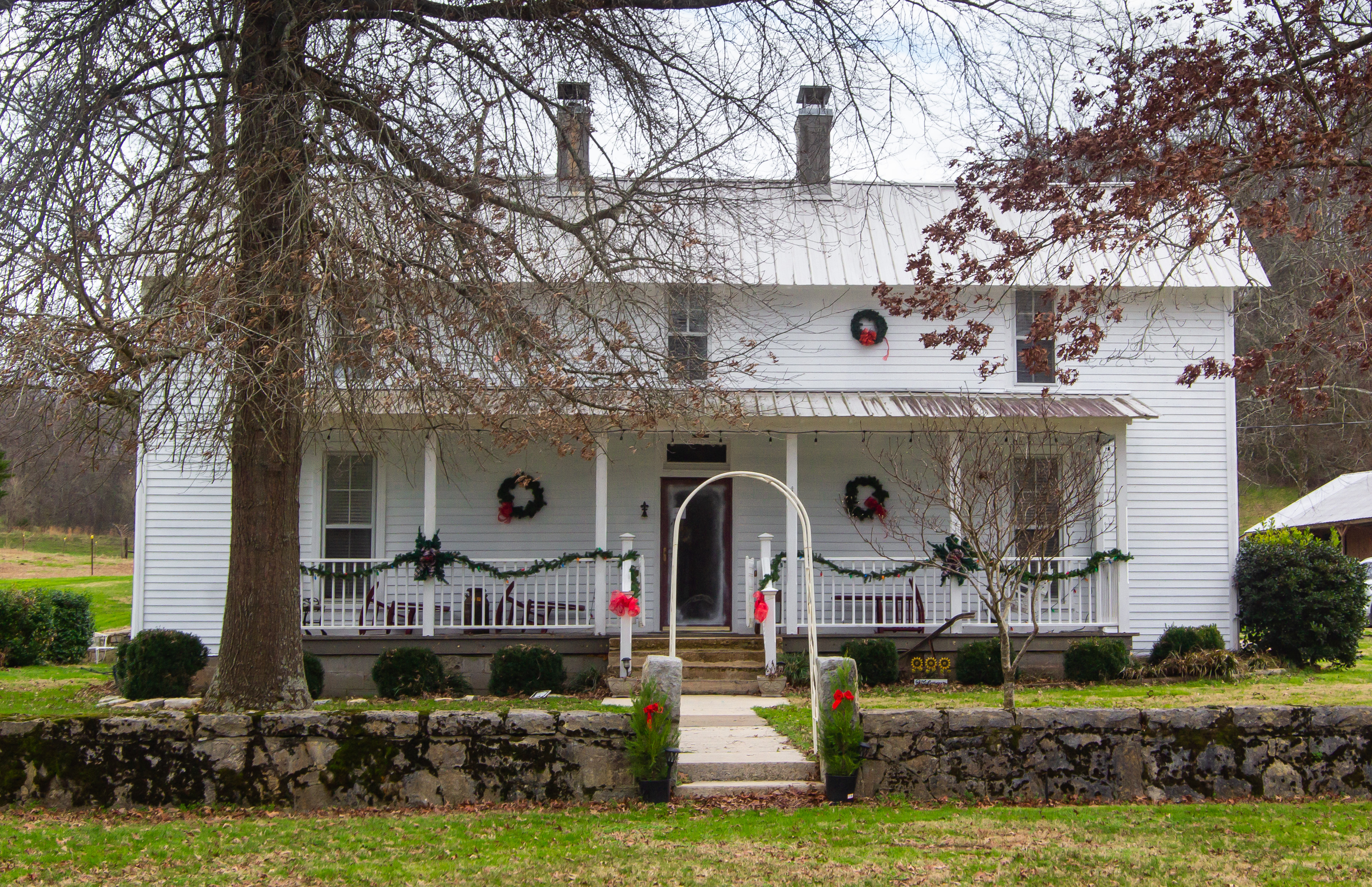

- Location within Tennessee
- Location: 120 Poorhouse Rd.
- Nearest city: Coldwater, Tennessee
- Coordinates: 35°03′59″N 86°40′46″W
- Area: 8 acres (3.2 ha)
- Built: 1874
- NRHP reference No.: 85001511
- Added to NRHP: July 11, 1985

The Lincoln County Poor House Farm is a historic poor farm in Lincoln County, Tennessee. It was built in 1874 thanks to Judge Nelson Carter, and the first superintendent was Alexander P. Hayes. The property includes several buildings, including the superintendent's residence, a dormitory for poor whites, a dormitory for poor blacks, and outbuildings. The residents, who included "the poor, aged, mentally incompetent, orphans, and indigent," grew vegetables on the land for their own consumption. The farm became a private residence in 1961. It has been listed on the National Register of Historic Places since July 11, 1985.
