= Jim Bob Cooter =

American football player and coach (born 1984)

Indianapolis Colts
- Title: Offensive coordinator

Personal information
- Born: July 3, 1984 (age 42); Fayetteville, Tennessee, U.S.

Career information
- Position: Quarterback
- High school: Lincoln (Fayetteville)
- College: Tennessee

Career history
- Tennessee (2007–2008) Graduate assistant; Indianapolis Colts (2009–2011) Offensive assistant; Kansas City Chiefs (2012) Offensive quality control coach; Denver Broncos (2013) Offensive assistant; Detroit Lions (2014–2018); Quarterbacks coach (2014-2015); Offensive coordinator (2016-2018); New York Jets (2019–2020) Running backs coach; Philadelphia Eagles (2021) Consultant; Jacksonville Jaguars (2022) Passing game coordinator; Indianapolis Colts (2023–present) Offensive coordinator
- Coaching profile at Pro Football Reference

James Robert Cooter (born July 3, 1984) is an American professional football coach who is the offensive coordinator for the Indianapolis Colts of the National Football League (NFL). He previously served as the offensive coordinator for the Detroit Lions from 2015 until 2018, and also worked as running backs coach for the New York Jets. He played college football for the University of Tennessee, and started out coaching for his alma mater before becoming an NFL coach.

== Early life and education ==
Jim Bob Cooter attended Lincoln County High School in Fayetteville, Tennessee, and the University of Tennessee, where he was a backup quarterback for the Tennessee Volunteers football team. He appeared in three games for the Volunteers, and was named to the Academic All-Southeastern Conference team.

== Coaching career ==
=== Early career ===
Cooter served as a graduate assistant for Tennessee in 2007 and 2008. He was then hired as an offensive assistant by the Indianapolis Colts, working for them from 2009 through 2011. Cooter served as the offensive quality control coach for the Kansas City Chiefs in 2012 and then joined the Denver Broncos as an offensive assistant in 2013 with the support of Peyton Manning.

=== Detroit Lions ===
The Lions hired Cooter as their quarterbacks coach in 2014. After the season, they denied a request of the Chicago Bears, who wanted to interview him for their offensive coordinator position.

The Lions promoted Cooter to offensive coordinator during the 2015 season, after former offensive coordinator Joe Lombardi was fired midseason. He remained the offensive coordinator for the Lions until January 1, 2019, when it was announced that the Lions would not be renewing his contract.

=== New York Jets ===
On February 8, 2019, the New York Jets hired Cooter as the running backs coach under new head coach Adam Gase.

=== Philadelphia Eagles ===
While not officially on the coaching staff, Cooter spent the 2021 season as an independent consultant for the Philadelphia Eagles. Head coach Nick Sirianni, who had coached with Cooter with the Kansas City Chiefs 2012, "nonchalantly" announced this during a press conference after tying the New York Jets early in the season, stating:

I thought the operation was really good. I was calling the play to [offensive coordinator] Shane [Steichen], Shane did a good job of getting the call in there when we're in 2-minute situations. [Passing game coordinator] Kevin Patullo is really doing a lot of, "Hey, here's our scenario of what we're in." And Jim Bob Cooter is getting all the scenarios from the 2-minute around the league so we can prepare for it.

During follow-up questions, Sirianni went on to clarify Cooter's role with the team:

Obviously, he's got a lot of experience and he's a great football mind. I think very highly of him. So, he's doing special projects for me and consulting here, which has been great. If I see a play or if we talk about a play that -- I just think this is really important. When you put a new play into your system that you maybe saw on tape, I think it's very easy for a coach to do that and be like, "Oh, I saw that on tape. This looks great. I'm just going to through it my offense." Well, do you know everything there is to know about that play? I'm not saying Jim Bob knows everything there is to know about every play, but what he is able to do is while we're doing something else, he's able to go research that play. I've already seen the benefit of that with a couple new wrinkles we have in this offense. So really excited to have him. I haven't really ever had that on a staff, and sometimes it deters you from putting in a play that you might like. So we have really gotten a lot out of him and really excited he's here.

=== Jacksonville Jaguars ===
On February 17, 2022, Cooter was hired by the Jacksonville Jaguars as their passing game coordinator under head coach Doug Pederson.

=== Indianapolis Colts ===
On February 20, 2023, Cooter was hired as an offensive coordinator by the Indianapolis Colts.

== Personal life ==
Cooter is from Fayetteville. He was arrested for driving under the influence in June 2006, and was suspended from the Volunteers as a result. In 2009, he was charged with aggravated burglary after climbing into a window and getting into a woman's bed. The charges were later dropped.
