= Whitaker-Motlow House =

Historic house in Tennessee, United States

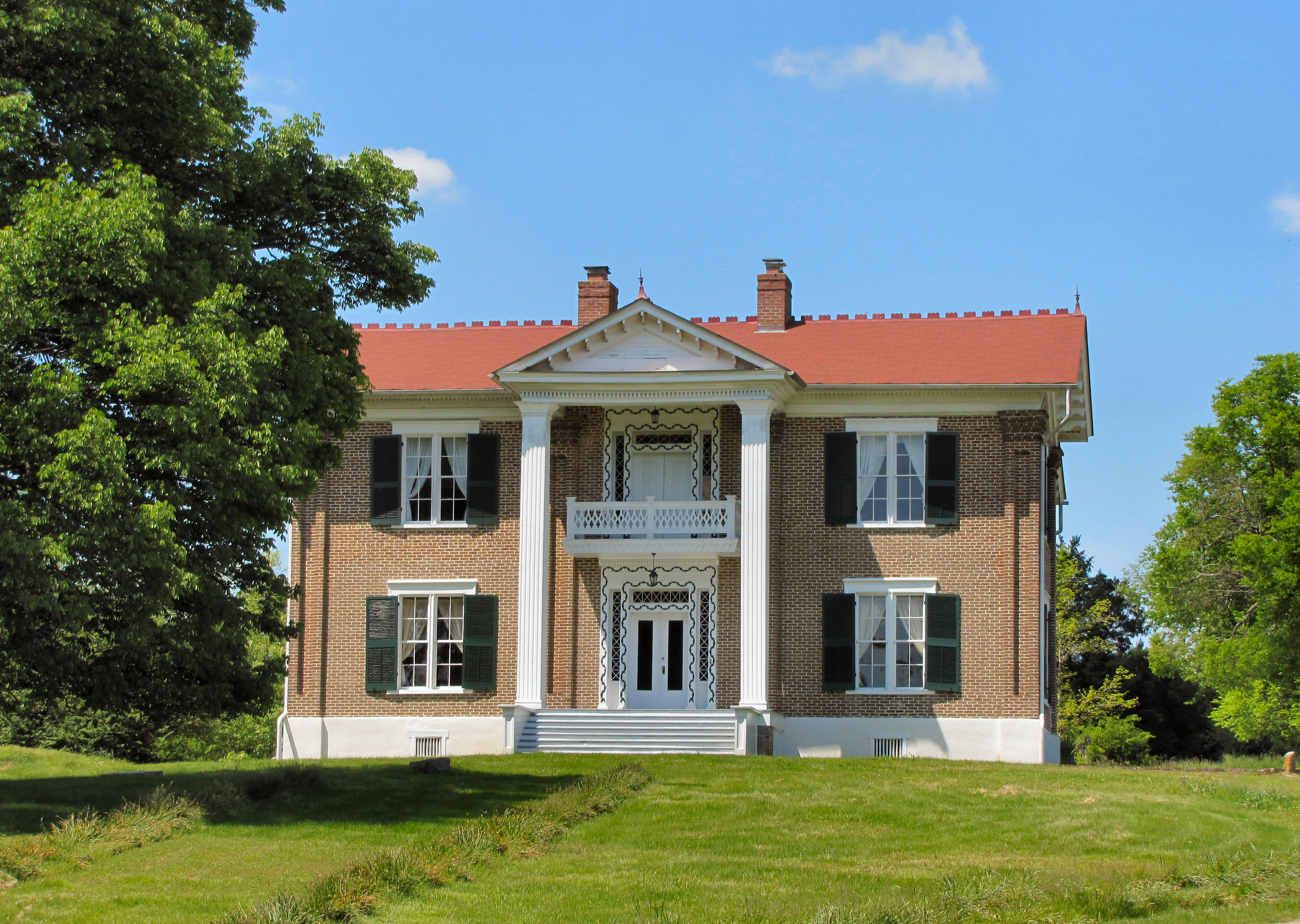
Whitaker-Motlow House

The Whitaker-Motlow House is a historic house at 740 Lynchburg Highway in Mulberry, Tennessee, that is listed on the National Register of Historic Places.

The house was built in about 1850 by Newton Whitaker, whose family had been among the earliest settlers of Mulberry. It is a two-story brick structure built on an I-house plan. Its design is considered to be transitional between the Greek Revival and Italianate architectural styles, including elements characteristic of each of these styles. A single-bay two-story portico with a bracketed pediment is a prominent feature of the house.

The second story of the house was severely damaged by a tornado in 1909, but was subsequently rebuilt in the same style as the original. Carl and Maria Maroney, who acquired the house in 1987, made major structural repairs and endeavored to restore the historic building, using original materials when possible. In 2011 the house was listed on the National Register of Historic Places following research by Jillian Rael, a graduate student at the University of Alabama, Huntsville.
