= Lincoln County High School (Tennessee) =

Location
- 1233 Huntsville Highway; Fayetteville, Lincoln County, Tennessee 37334; United States

Information
- Type: Public high school
- Principal: Amy Clemons
- Staff: 66.50 (FTE)
- Enrollment: 1,201 (2022-23)
- Student to teacher ratio: 18.06
- Colors: Red, white and blue
- Nickname: Falcons

Lincoln County High School is a high school located in Fayetteville, Tennessee. The school first opened for the 1979–1980 school year, with the first graduating class in 1980. It serves grades 9–12, and is located at 1233 Huntsville Highway. The overall school letter grade was a B during the 2023–24 school year.

== History ==
Lincoln County opened its doors in 1979 as a comprehensive high school, unifying several smaller community high schools.

== Demographics ==
Lincoln County High School has 120 support and professional staff. The school population is 88.2% Caucasian, 7.2% Hispanic, 2% African American, and 1.9% are two or more races. Economically disadvantaged students make up 20% of the school population, as defined by the amount who are on direct certification.

== Notable alumni ==
- Jim Bob Cooter, Indianapolis Colts offensive coordinator
- Ricky Blake, former NFL and CFL player
- Lamar Divens, former NFL player
- Kelly Holcomb, former NFL player
- Anthony Shelton, former NFL and CFL player
- Sharon Price John, businesswoman and podcast host
