= Emmett McDonald House =

Historic house in Arkansas, United States

- U.S. National Register of Historic Places
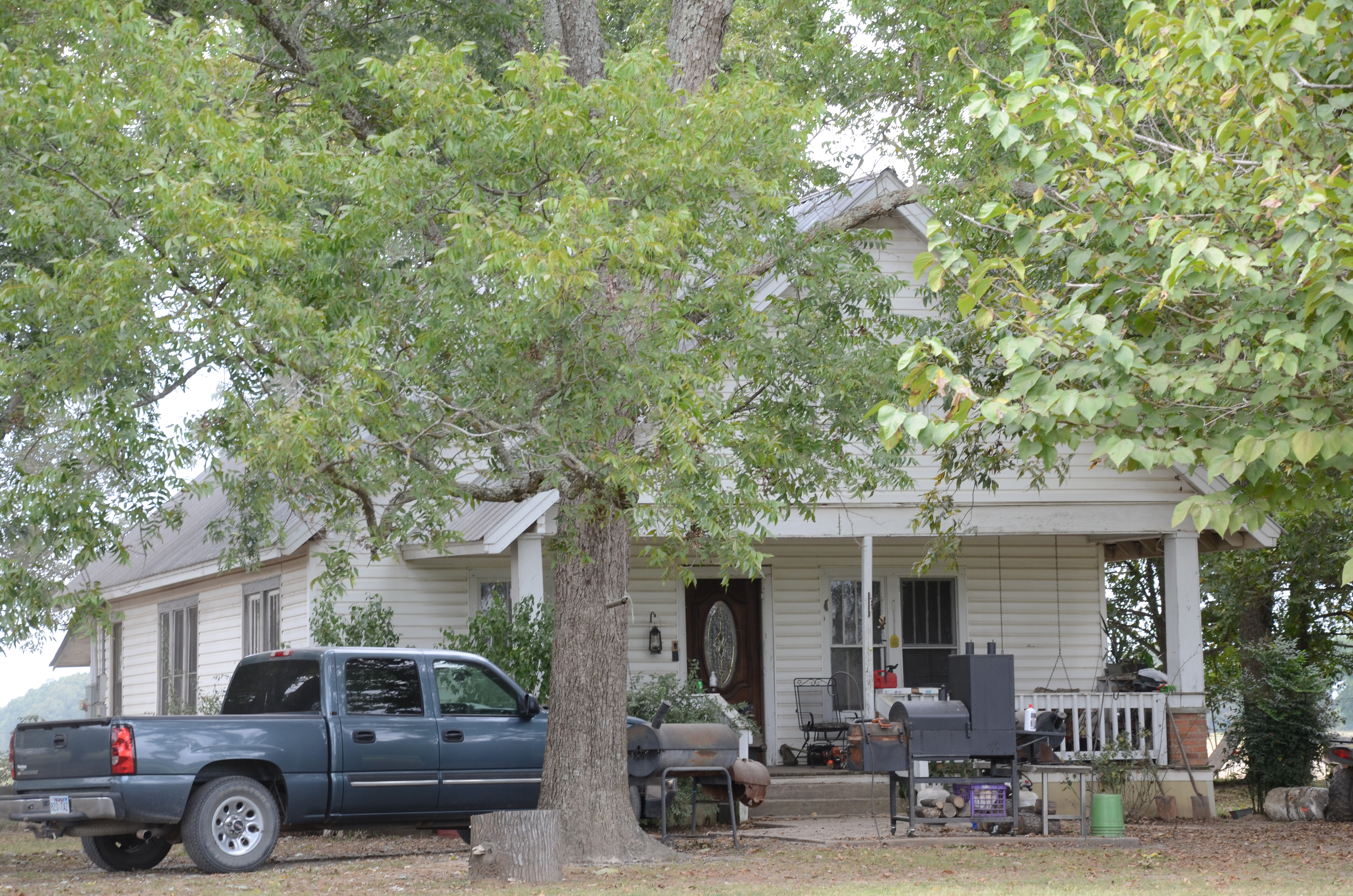

- Location within Arkansas Location within the United States
- Nearest city: McRae, Arkansas
- Coordinates: 35°5′40″N 91°48′27″W
- Area: less than one acre
- Built: 1935
- Architectural style: Vernacular gable entry
- MPS: White County MPS
- NRHP reference No.: 91001368
- Added to NRHP: July 20, 1992

The Emmett McDonald House is a historic house in rural White County, Arkansas. It is located southeast of McRae, east of the junction of South Grand Avenue and Gammill Road. It is a 1 1/2-story vernacular wood-frame structure, with a tall gabled roof and novelty siding. A gabled porch extends across the front, supported by box columns on brick piers. It was built about 1935, and is one of the few surviving houses from that time period in the county.

The house was listed on the National Register of Historic Places in 1992.

== See also ==
- National Register of Historic Places listings in White County, Arkansas
