= Nash–McDonald House =

Historic house in Kentucky, United States

- U.S. National Register of Historic Places
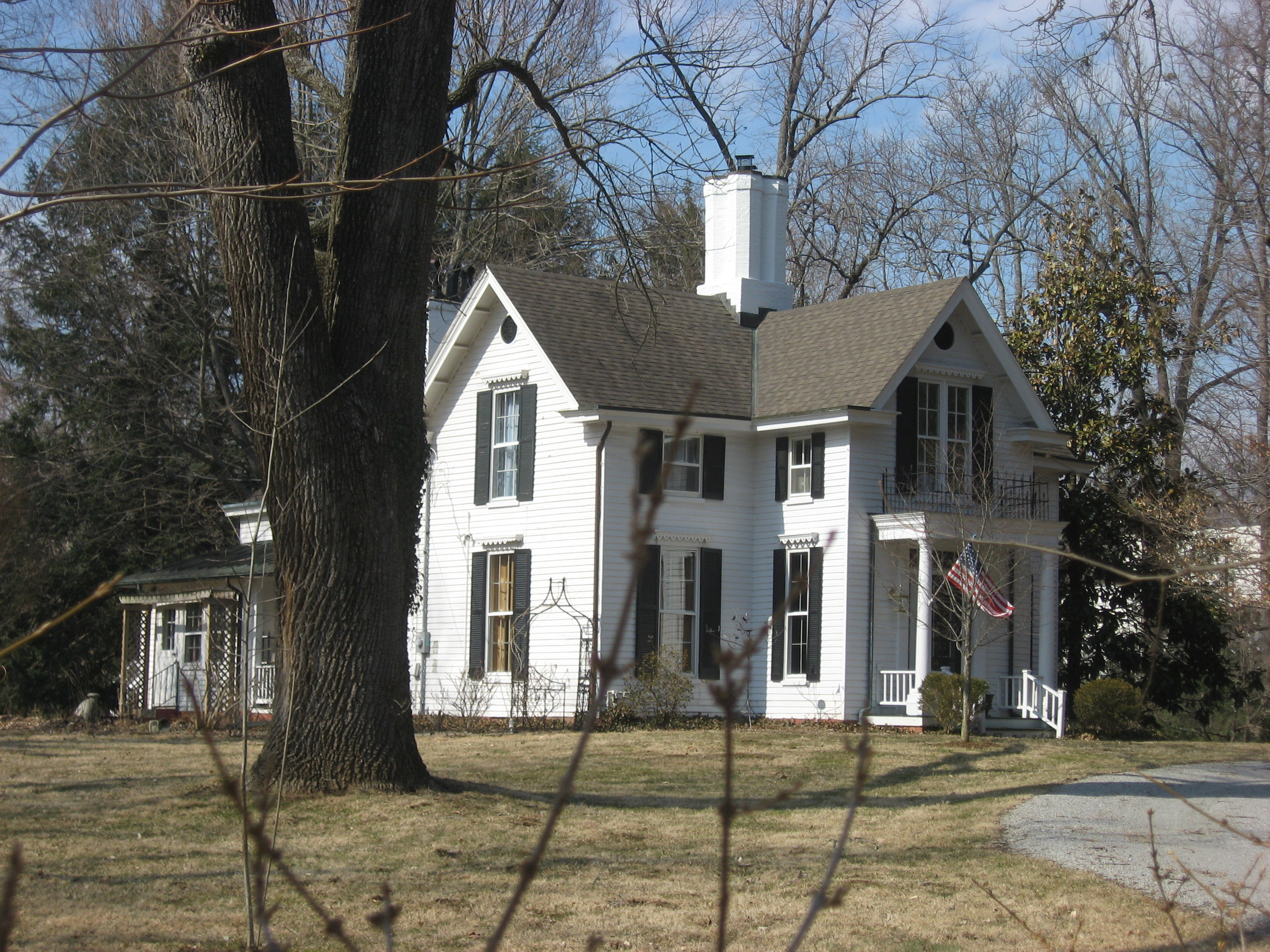
- Front and southern side

- Location within Kentucky Location within the United States
- Location: 1306 Bellewood Rd., Anchorage, Kentucky
- Coordinates: 38°15′52″N 85°32′40″W
- Built: 1869
- Architectural style: Gothic Revival
- MPS: Jefferson County MRA
- NRHP reference No.: 80001564
- Added to NRHP: December 5, 1980

Nash–McDonald House is a house in Anchorage, Kentucky with elements of Gothic Revival architecture that was built in 1869.

It was deemed to be a "fine example of the Gothic Revival, which is relatively rare in the County although more prevalent in Anchorage", according to a 1979 Kentucky Historic Resources review of the property. The review asserts it is significant as one of several houses built by Edward D. Hobbs. This property was sold by Hobbs to M.B. Nash in 1869 for $10,139.71. It was home during 1884 to 1887 to Rev. William McDonald. McDonald founded the Louisville Rugby School in Louisville. a school which, in '"its early years, the school was 'the largest and most flourishing private school for boys west of the Alleghanies'".

It was listed on the National Register of Historic Places in 1980.
