= Irving McDonald House =

Historic house in Nevada, United States

- U.S. National Register of Historic Places
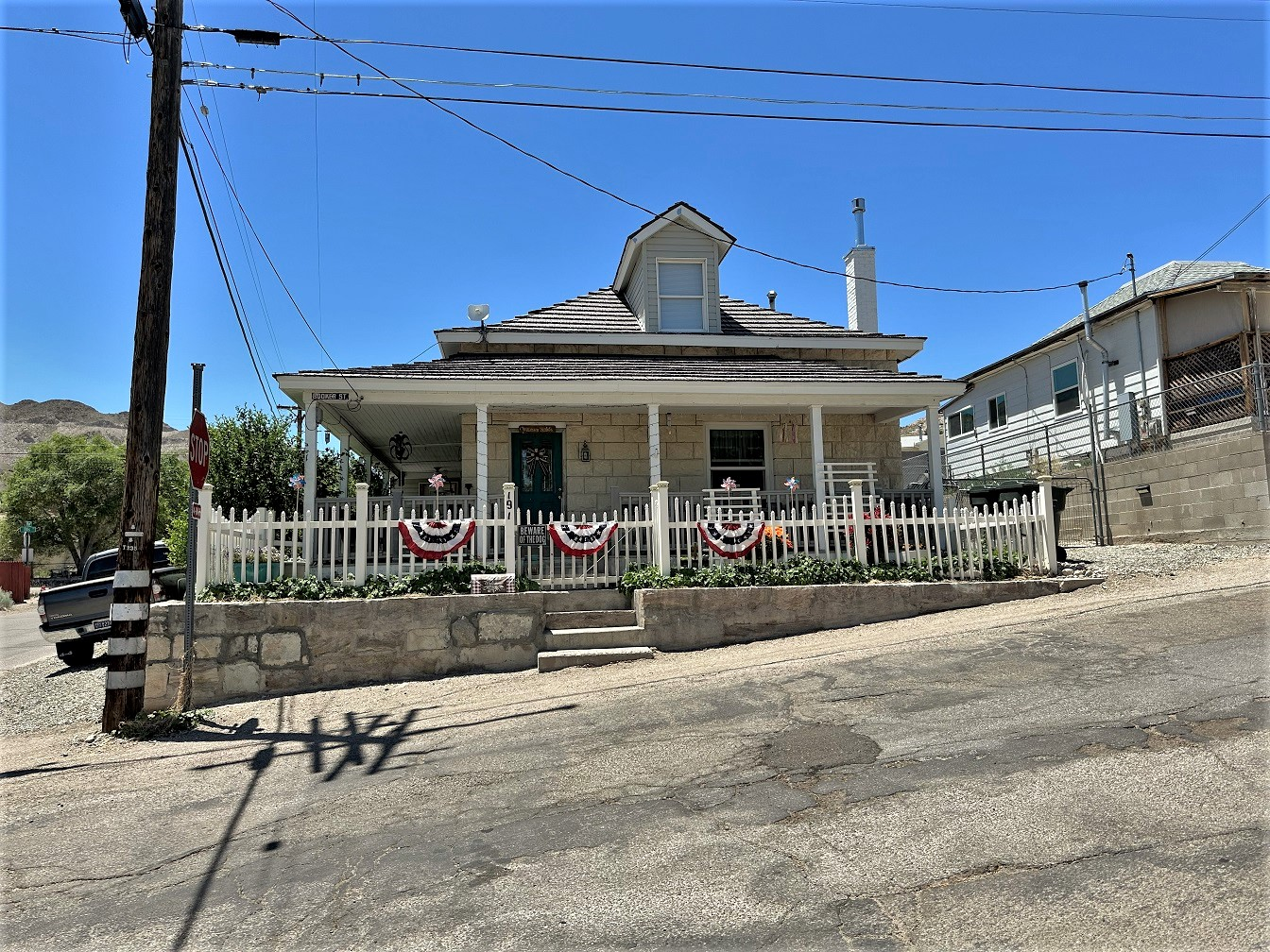
- Irving McDonald House in 2024

- Location within Nevada Location within the United States
- Location: 191 Booker; Tonopah, Nevada
- Coordinates: 38.06491°N 117.23253°W
- Area: less than one acre
- Built: 1906
- Built by: J.W. Smith
- MPS: Tonopah MRA
- NRHP reference No.: 82003235
- Added to NRHP: May 20, 1982

The Irving McDonald House at 191 Booker in Tonopah, Nevada, United States, is a historic stone house that was built in 1906. It was listed on the National Register of Historic Places in 1982.

It was deemed significant for association with businessman and lawyer Irving McDonald and "as a good example of local stone residential construction".
