= Mulberry, Tennessee =

- Unincorporated community
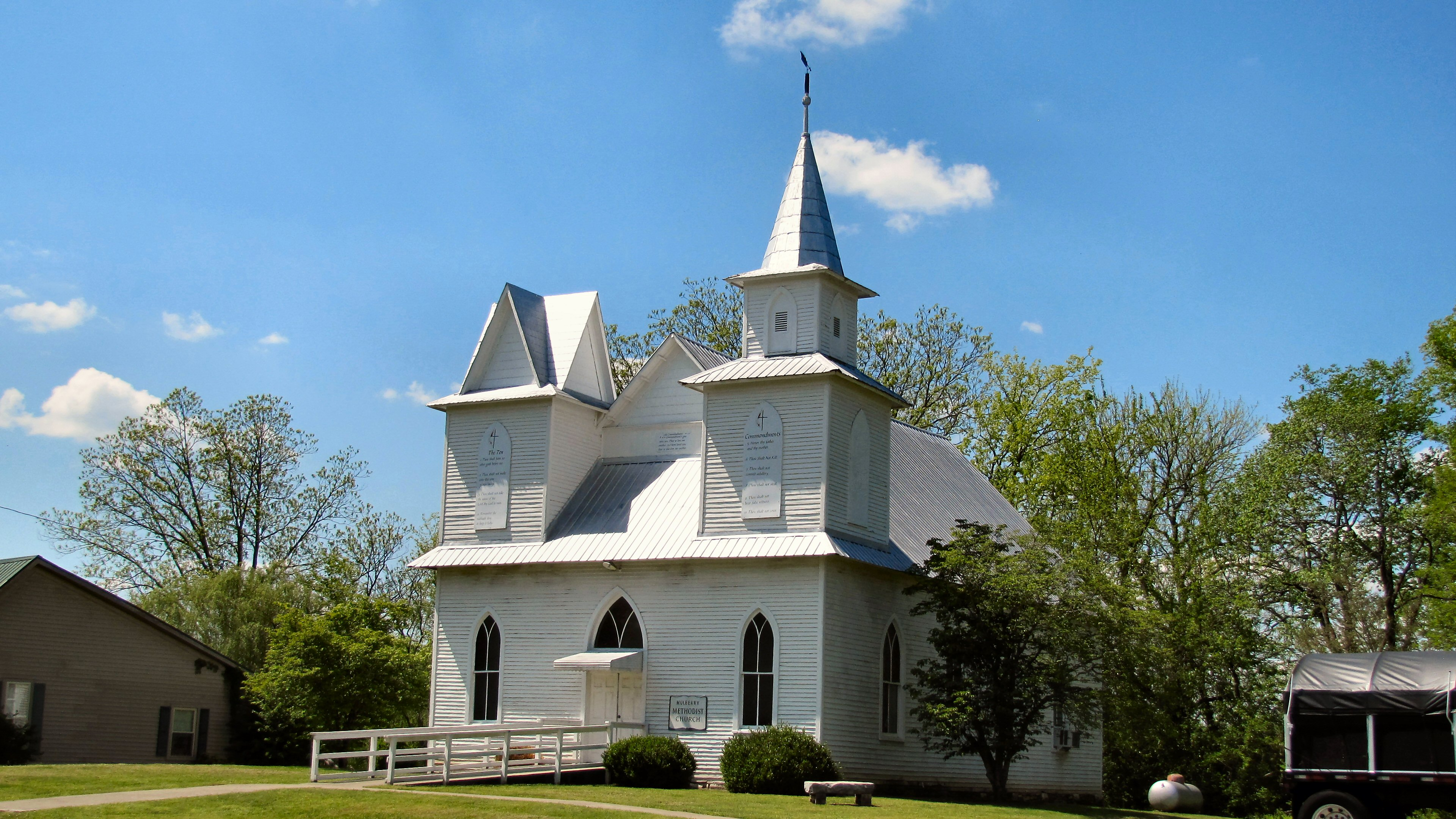
- Mulberry Methodist Church, one of three Carpenter Gothic churches facing Mulberry's town square

- Location within Tennessee Location within the United States
- Coordinates: 35°12′38″N 86°27′37″W
- Country: United States
- State: Tennessee
- County: Lincoln
- Elevation: 745 ft (227 m)
- Time zone: UTC-6 (Central (CST))
  - Summer (DST): UTC-5 (CDT)
- ZIP code: 37359
- Area code: 931
- GNIS feature ID: 1295054

Mulberry is an unincorporated community in Lincoln County, Tennessee, United States. Mulberry is located along Tennessee State Route 50, 7.4 miles (11.9 km) northeast of Fayetteville. Mulberry has a post office with ZIP code 37359, which opened on January 7, 1828. The community was named for the red mulberry plants found in the area.
