= Echo Manor =

Plantation house in Raleigh, North Carolina

Coordinates: 35°42′9″N 78°38′59″W

Echo Manor is a historic plantation house in Raleigh, North Carolina. It is considered the oldest house in Raleigh.

== History ==
Echo Manor was possibly built in 1741 for Robert Whitaker on an 840-acre parcel of land granted by King George II, although historians at North Carolina State University speculate that the structure likely dates to the late eighteenth century, around 1790. Whitaker's son, Colonel John Whitaker, built Whitaker Mill and was active in establishing new government in Wake County.

Likely built in sections, Echo Manor underwent additions in the early nineteenth century. The Doric columns were added in the 1950s by Vance Swift. The interior includes Greek Revival doors and mantels and Victorian stair details. Echo Manor was remodeled multiple times in the twentieth century. It is the oldest house standing on its original foundation in Wake County.
