= McDonald–Bolner House =

Historic house in Tennessee, United States

- McDonald-Bolner House
- U.S. National Register of Historic Places
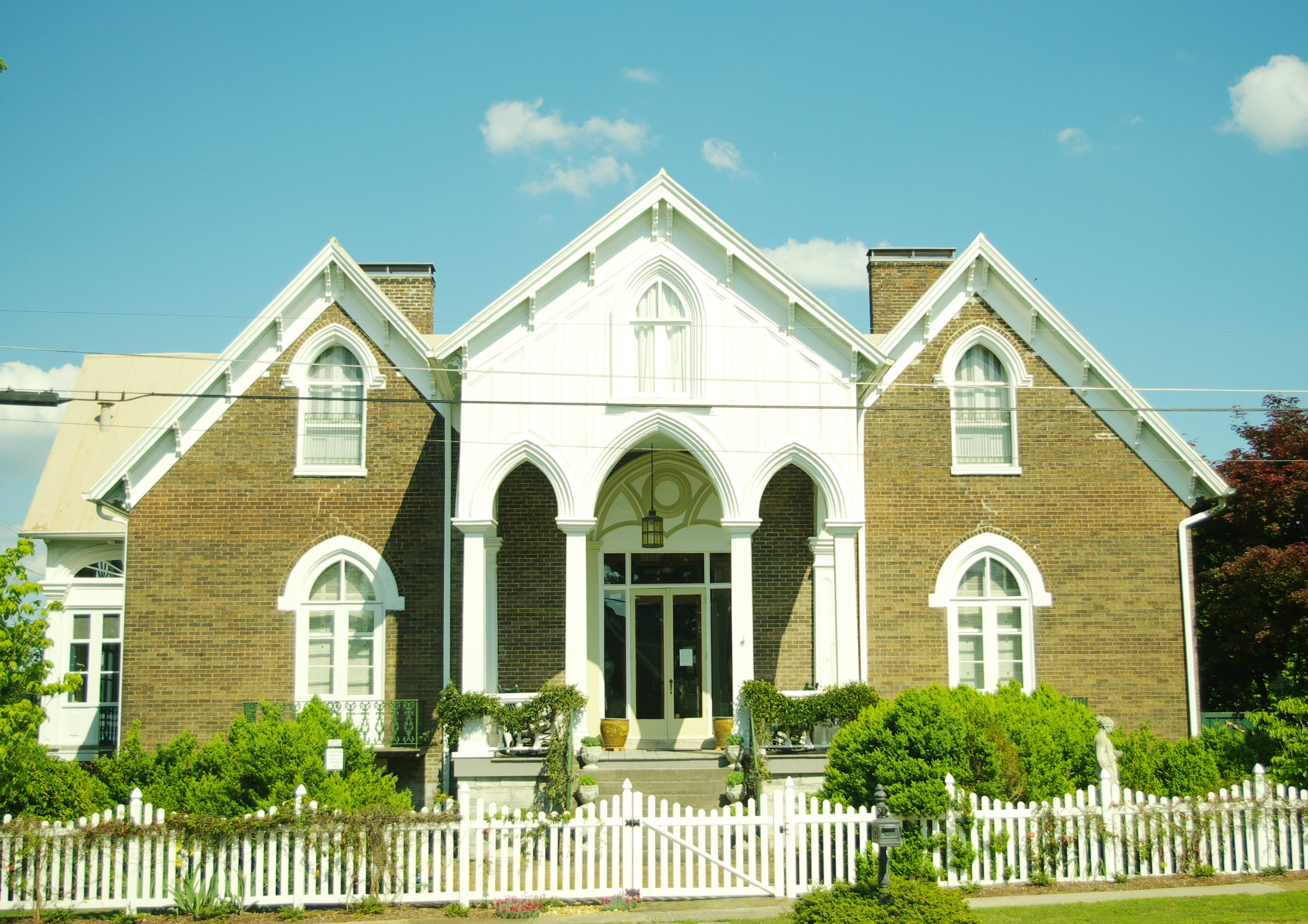
- The house in 2015

- Location within Tennessee
- Location: 400 South Elk, Fayetteville, Tennessee
- Coordinates: 35°08′57″N 86°34′10″W
- Area: 0.3 acres (0.12 ha)
- Built: 1859
- Architectural style: Gothic
- NRHP reference No.: 84003579
- Added to NRHP: May 31, 1984

The McDonald–Bolner House is a historic house in Fayetteville, Tennessee. It was built in 1859 for R. A. McDonald, a cotton farmer, and his wife, née Martha Cordelia McKinney. It remained in the McDonald family until the 1870s. It was purchased by Thomas E. Bolner in 1959.

The house was designed in the Gothic Revival architectural style. It has been listed on the National Register of Historic Places since May 31, 1984.
