= Charles Whitaker House (Davenport, Iowa) =

Historic house in Iowa, United States

- U.S. National Register of Historic Places
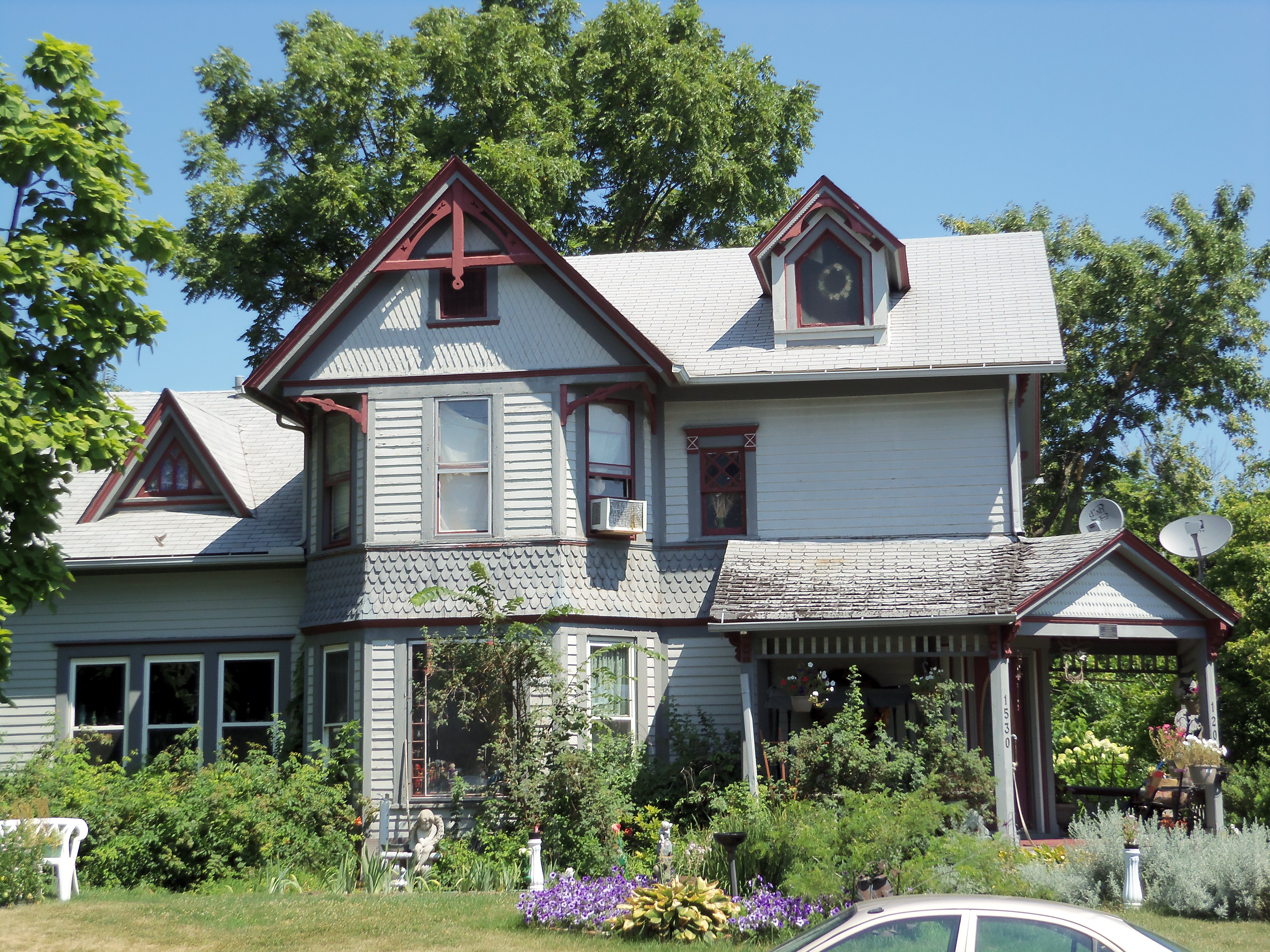

- Location within Iowa Location within the United States
- Location: 1530 E. 12th St. Davenport, Iowa
- Coordinates: 41°31′56″N 90°33′8″W
- Area: 1 acre (0.40 ha)
- Built: 1885
- Architectural style: Queen Anne
- MPS: Davenport MRA
- NRHP reference No.: 85000090
- Added to NRHP: January 14, 1985

The Charles Whitaker House is a historic building located on the east side of Davenport, Iowa, United States. It has been listed on the National Register of Historic Places since 1985.

== History ==
Charles and Josephine Whitaker took up residence in this house around 1892. He was a carpenter at that time and may have built this house and a similar house across Adams Street himself. Whitaker went on to become a general building contractor. He continued to live here until 1932.

== Architecture ==
The two-story house features a three-bay, front gable plan that is similar to the McClelland style, which was a popular vernacular house style in Davenport in the late 19th century. Decorative details from the Greek Revival, Italianate, or Queen Anne styles were generally added to the basic house form. The Whitaker house utilizes elements of the Queen Anne style. They are found in the full-height polygonal bay with decorative shingling on the south side, the pendant vergeboard and the attenuated brackets below the gable. The house's location on a corner lot is accentuated by the polygonal porch and its main entrance set in a chamfered corner.
