= Fayetteville, Tennessee =

- City
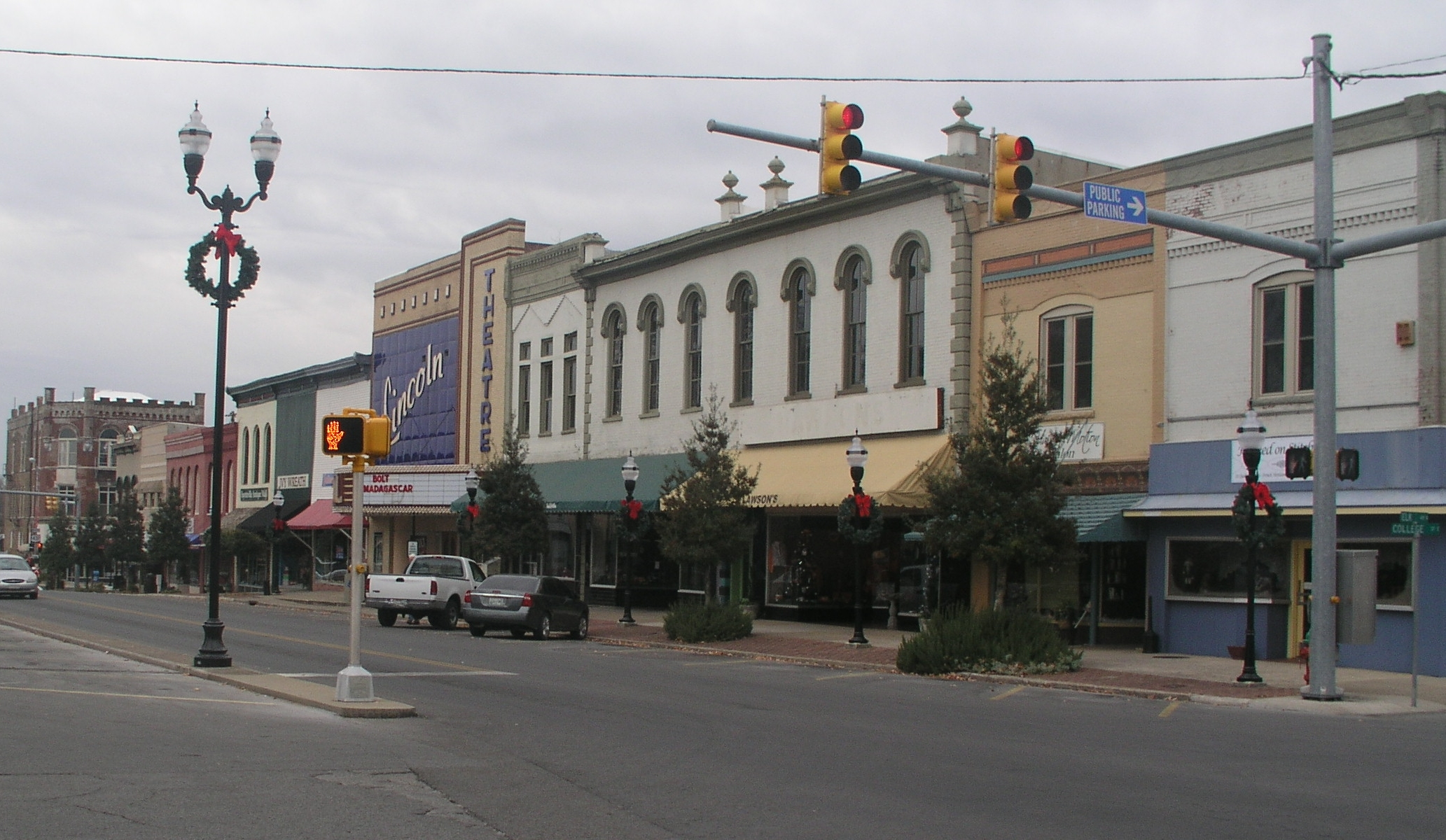
- Fayetteville town Square

- Seal

- Location of Fayetteville in Lincoln County, Tennessee.
- Coordinates: 35°9′10″N 86°34′17″W
- Country: United States
- State: Tennessee
- County: Lincoln
- Founded: 1809
- Named for: Fayetteville, North Carolina

Government
  - Mayor: Donna Hartman

Area
  - Total: 9.62 sq mi (24.92 km^{2})
  - Land: 9.62 sq mi (24.92 km^{2})
  - Water: 0 sq mi (0.00 km^{2})
- Elevation: 705 ft (215 m)

Population (2020)
  - Total: 7,068
  - Density: 734.7/sq mi (283.66/km^{2})
- Time zone: UTC-6 (Central (CST))
  - Summer (DST): UTC-5 (CDT)
- ZIP code: 37334
- Area code: 931
- FIPS code: 47-25920
- GNIS feature ID: 1647829
- Website: www.fayettevilletn.com

Fayetteville is the county seat of and the most populous city in Lincoln County, Tennessee, United States. The city's population was 7,095 at the 2020 census.

== History ==
Fayetteville is the largest city in Lincoln County. The city was established in 1809 by an Act of the Tennessee General Assembly. The act became effective on January 1, 1810.

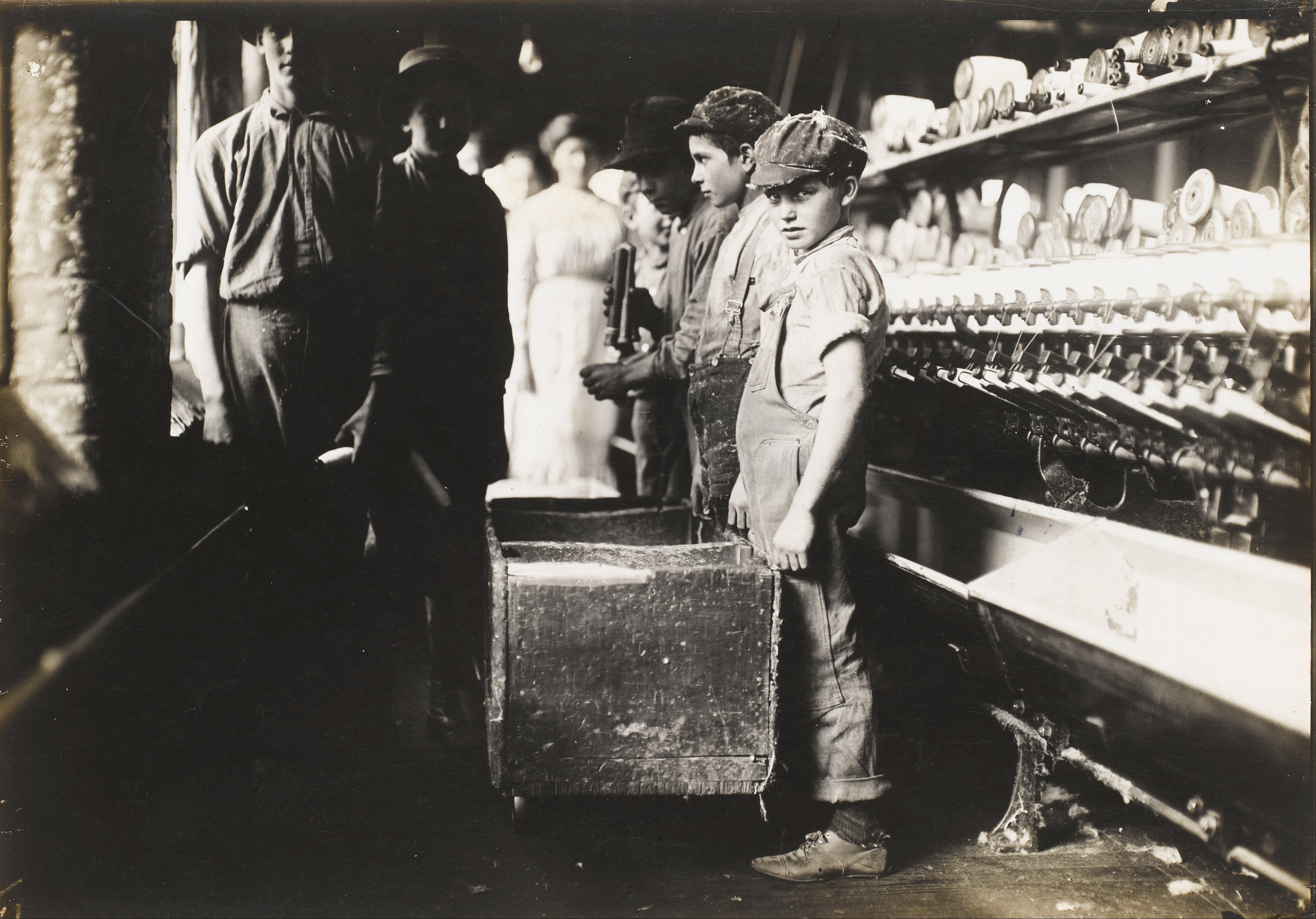
Child labor at the Elk Cotton Mills in Fayetteville, 1910. Photo by Lewis Hine.

The lands that include Lincoln County and Fayetteville were originally part of Cherokee and Chickasaw land. They were ceded to the United States in 1806.

The city was named for Fayetteville, North Carolina, where some of its earliest residents had lived before moving to Tennessee. The earlier town was named for Gilbert du Motier, Marquis de Lafayette, a French general who fought for the United States during the American Revolution. Lincoln County was named for Major General Benjamin Lincoln, second in command of the U.S. Army at the end of the Revolutionary War.

The earliest white settler was Ezekiel Norris, who gave the one hundred acres upon which the city was built. In addition to Ezekiel Norris, other founding fathers of Fayetteville include: Alexander and Andrew Greer, William Edmonson, and Matthew Buchanan.

In 1995, the International Gospel Hour radio broadcast, founded in Texarkana, Texas, by the clergyman V. E. Howard was transferred to the West Fayetteville Church of Christ in Fayetteville under the minister Winford Claiborne.

=== Tornadoes ===
Several devastating tornadoes of struck the city during its history. On February 29, 1952, the town was hit by a catastrophic and violent F4 tornado that damaged or obliterated numerous homes, businesses, trees, power lines, vehicles, and other buildings. Two people were killed and 150 others were injured. The city was also devastated by tornadoes on March 14, 1851; March 27, 1890; and April 29, 1909. An EF2 tornado on March 24, 2023 also followed a path similar to the 1952 tornado.

== Geography ==
According to the United States Census Bureau, the city has a total area of 7.3 square miles (19 km^{2}), all land.

=== Climate ===
The climate of Fayetteville is characterized by relatively warm temperatures and heavy rainfall throughout the year. The Köppen Climate Classification subtype for this climate is "Cfa" (Humid Subtropical Climate). Fayetteville's Trewartha climate classification is also subtropical (Cf).

Climate data for Fayetteville Water Plant, Tennessee (1991–2020 normals, extremes 1957–present)
Month	Jan	Feb	Mar	Apr	May	Jun	Jul	Aug	Sep	Oct	Nov	Dec	Year
Record high °F (°C)	77 (25)	84 (29)	86 (30)	90 (32)	97 (36)	107 (42)	103 (39)	105 (41)	100 (38)	96 (36)	86 (30)	77 (25)	107 (42)
Mean maximum °F (°C)	68.4 (20.2)	72.8 (22.7)	79.4 (26.3)	84.5 (29.2)	89.5 (31.9)	94.1 (34.5)	95.9 (35.5)	95.8 (35.4)	93.4 (34.1)	86.3 (30.2)	78.0 (25.6)	68.9 (20.5)	97.7 (36.5)
Mean daily maximum °F (°C)	49.8 (9.9)	54.7 (12.6)	63.3 (17.4)	72.8 (22.7)	79.6 (26.4)	86.2 (30.1)	88.8 (31.6)	88.7 (31.5)	83.6 (28.7)	73.5 (23.1)	61.6 (16.4)	52.4 (11.3)	71.3 (21.8)
Daily mean °F (°C)	40.2 (4.6)	44.1 (6.7)	51.6 (10.9)	60.3 (15.7)	67.9 (19.9)	75.1 (23.9)	78.2 (25.7)	77.5 (25.3)	71.7 (22.1)	60.7 (15.9)	49.8 (9.9)	42.8 (6.0)	60.0 (15.6)
Mean daily minimum °F (°C)	30.5 (−0.8)	33.4 (0.8)	39.9 (4.4)	47.9 (8.8)	56.2 (13.4)	63.9 (17.7)	67.7 (19.8)	66.3 (19.1)	59.8 (15.4)	47.9 (8.8)	38.1 (3.4)	33.2 (0.7)	48.7 (9.3)
Mean minimum °F (°C)	10.9 (−11.7)	15.2 (−9.3)	20.7 (−6.3)	29.7 (−1.3)	40.1 (4.5)	51.8 (11.0)	58.6 (14.8)	56.9 (13.8)	43.9 (6.6)	30.4 (−0.9)	20.8 (−6.2)	16.0 (−8.9)	8.8 (−12.9)
Record low °F (°C)	−26 (−32)	−5 (−21)	1 (−17)	19 (−7)	28 (−2)	35 (2)	47 (8)	47 (8)	29 (−2)	19 (−7)	8 (−13)	−8 (−22)	−26 (−32)
Average precipitation inches (mm)	5.29 (134)	5.72 (145)	5.79 (147)	5.18 (132)	4.68 (119)	4.91 (125)	4.98 (126)	4.12 (105)	4.10 (104)	3.79 (96)	4.80 (122)	6.45 (164)	59.81 (1,519)
Average snowfall inches (cm)	0.2 (0.51)	0.4 (1.0)	0.5 (1.3)	0.0 (0.0)	0.0 (0.0)	0.0 (0.0)	0.0 (0.0)	0.0 (0.0)	0.0 (0.0)	0.0 (0.0)	0.0 (0.0)	0.0 (0.0)	1.1 (2.8)
Average precipitation days (≥ 0.01 in)	11.5	11.9	12.0	10.8	11.8	12.1	12.2	10.4	8.4	9.2	10.3	13.4	134.0
Average snowy days (≥ 0.1 in)	0.2	0.4	0.2	0.0	0.0	0.0	0.0	0.0	0.0	0.0	0.0	0.0	0.8
Source: NOAA

== Demographics ==
Historical population
Census	Pop.	Note	%±
1850	995		—
1870	1,206		—
1880	2,104		74.5%
1890	2,410		14.5%
1900	2,708		12.4%
1910	3,439		27.0%
1920	3,629		5.5%
1930	3,822		5.3%
1940	4,684		22.6%
1950	5,447		16.3%
1960	6,804		24.9%
1970	7,691		13.0%
1980	7,559		−1.7%
1990	6,921		−8.4%
2000	6,994		1.1%
2010	6,827		−2.4%
2020	7,068		3.5%

As of the 2020 census, Fayetteville had a population of 7,068.

=== Racial and ethnic composition ===
Racial composition as of the 2020 census
Race	Number	Percent
White	4,862	68.8%
Black or African American	1,476	20.9%
American Indian and Alaska Native	43	0.6%
Asian	44	0.6%
Native Hawaiian and Other Pacific Islander	2	0.0%
Some other race	112	1.6%
Two or more races	529	7.5%
Hispanic or Latino (of any race)	271	3.8%

=== 2020 census ===
The median age was 43.9 years. 21.9% of residents were under the age of 18 and 23.4% of residents were 65 years of age or older. For every 100 females there were 81.8 males, and for every 100 females age 18 and over there were 78.0 males age 18 and over.

97.8% of residents lived in urban areas, while 2.2% lived in rural areas.

There were 3,163 households in Fayetteville, of which 26.0% had children under the age of 18 living in them. Of all households, 31.2% were married-couple households, 19.3% were households with a male householder and no spouse or partner present, and 43.4% were households with a female householder and no spouse or partner present. About 41.7% of all households were made up of individuals and 21.6% had someone living alone who was 65 years of age or older. There were 1,548 families residing in the city.

There were 3,482 housing units, of which 9.2% were vacant. The homeowner vacancy rate was 2.3% and the rental vacancy rate was 6.6%.

=== 2000 census ===
As of the census of 2000, there was a population of 6,994, with 3,054 households and 1,804 families residing in the city. The population density was 952.2 inhabitants per square mile (367.6/km^{2}). There were 3,370 housing units at an average density of 458.8 per square mile (177.1/km^{2}). The racial makeup of the city was 71.39% White, 26.22% African American, 0.30% Native American, 0.30% Asian, 0.09% Pacific Islander, 0.27% from other races, and 1.43% from two or more races. Hispanic or Latino of any race were 0.81% of the population.

There were 3,054 households, out of which 24.5% had children under the age of 18 living with them, 38.0% were married couples living together, 18.0% had a female householder with no husband present, and 40.9% were non-families. 37.8% of all households were made up of individuals, and 20.5% had someone living alone who was 65 years of age or older. The average household size was 2.14 and the average family size was 2.81.

In the city, the population was spread out, with 21.2% under the age of 18, 8.1% from 18 to 24, 22.9% from 25 to 44, 22.1% from 45 to 64, and 25.7% who were 65 years of age or older. The median age was 43 years. For every 100 females, there were 76.3 males. For every 100 females age 18 and over, there were 70.8 males.

The median income for a household in the city was $23,830, and the median income for a family was $32,477. Males had a median income of $26,957 versus $22,382 for females. The per capita income for the city was $18,391. About 15.1% of families and 20.8% of the population were below the poverty line, including 27.8% of those under age 18 and 20.6% of those age 65 or over.

== Landmarks ==
=== Old Stone Bridge ===
One of the most famous landmarks of Fayetteville is the remains of the Stone Bridge, commonly known by the locals of Fayetteville as the “Old Stone Bridge”. It was in 1860 that John Markum and Patrick Flannery, the architects and contractors, began the building of the bridge. Consisting of six arches, the bridge was completed in January 1862 with a final cost of $40,000. In 1863, during the Civil War, the bridge was ordered burned by General William T. Sherman, but this order was disobeyed because the river was easily forded at the bridge's base. The bridge stood until 1969, when it collapsed due to flooding.

=== Lincoln County Courthouse ===
The first courthouse for Lincoln County, which was made of logs, was completed in 1815. It was used as local headquarters by Union troops during the Civil War. The building was replaced by an Italianate structure in 1874. This second courthouse was demolished and replaced by the current Colonial Revival-style building in 1970.

=== Camp Blount Monument ===
The Camp Blount marker, erected in 1998, stands along Huntsville Highway (US-431) near the WalMart shopping center. The camp was located along the Elk River and was a meeting point for the Tennessee soldiers who were serving under General Andrew Jackson in the Creek War of 1813–1814. Camp Blount also was a meeting point for soldiers during the Seminole Wars in 1818 and 1836, and for both Confederate and Federal troops during the Civil War.

== Attractions ==
=== Lincoln County Fair ===
The Lincoln County Fair grounds are located in Fayetteville Tennessee. The Lincoln County Fair Association was issued its charter in 1906 and is a nonprofit organization with all profits going back into maintaining the fair grounds. In 1980, the fair became a district fair, serving five counties and paying over $10,000 in agriculture premiums.

As far back as 1889, there are records for the harness racing that takes place still today at the fairgrounds. The racetrack was made of red clay until 1978 when it was converted to an all weather track by grading it and covering it in limestone dust. Other elements of the fair include a demolition derby, rides, food vendors, a cattle showing, pageants, art competition, and concerts.

== Economy ==
Bavarian-based Grammer AG operates a site in Fayetteville. It manufactures components for the automotive industry.

== Education ==
Lincoln County Schools includes Lincoln County High School.

== Notable people ==
- Eddie Blake, former NFL and CFL player
- John Neely Bryan, founder of the city of Dallas, Texas
- Jim Bob Cooter, NFL offensive coordinator
- Rick Dempsey, former Major League Baseball player
- Bob Higgins, former Major League Baseball player
- Kelly Holcomb, former NFL quarterback
- Frank Kelso, U.S. Navy admiral
- Ira L. Kimes, brigadier general and Marine aviator
- Anthony Shelton, former NFL and CFL player
- Hatton W. Sumners, former congressman
- Ed Townsend, singer-songwriter, co-wrote "Let's Get It On" with Marvin Gaye
