= List of F4, EF4, and IF4 tornadoes =

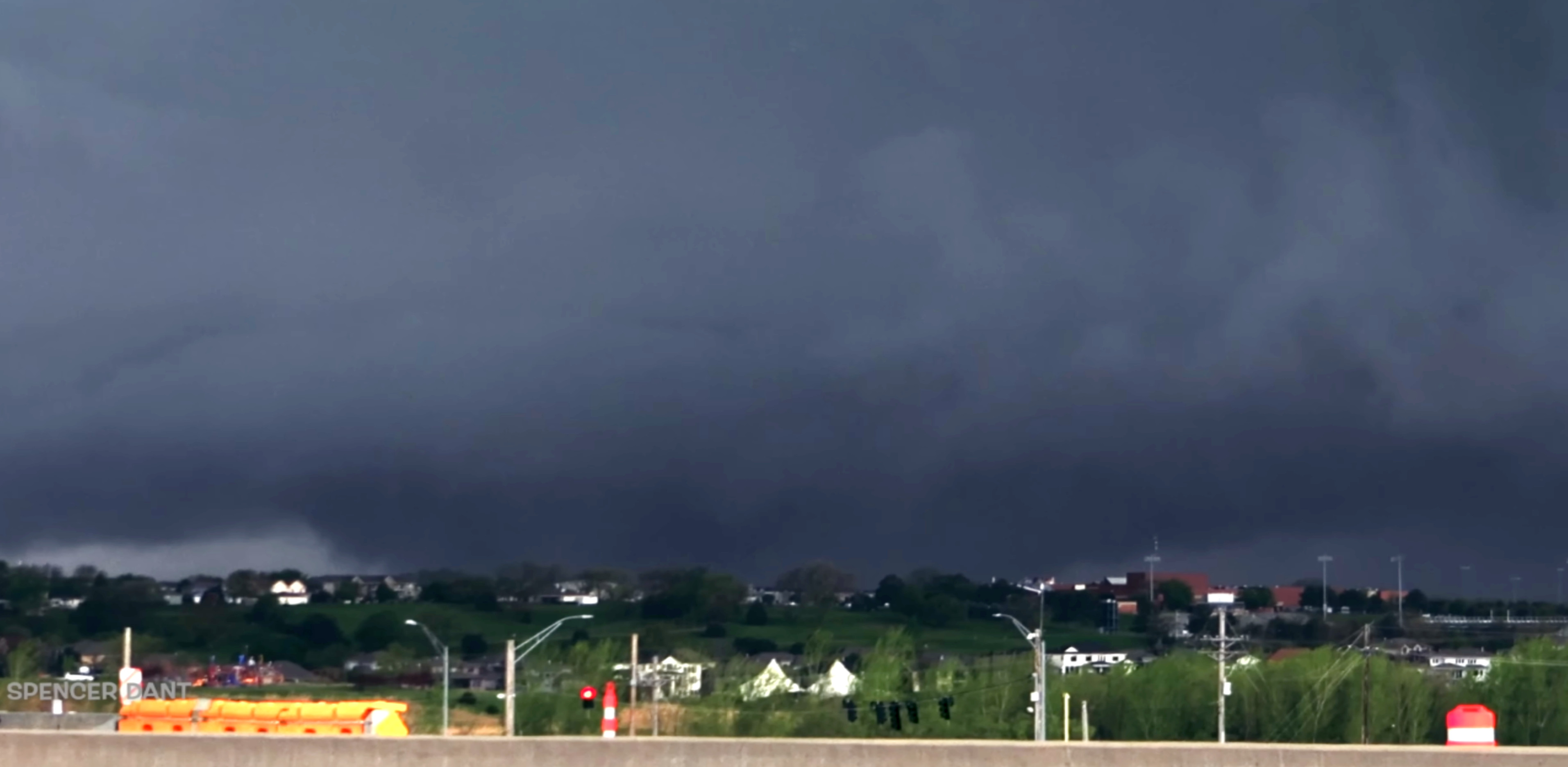
A wedge EF4 tornado impacting the town of Elkhorn, Nebraska

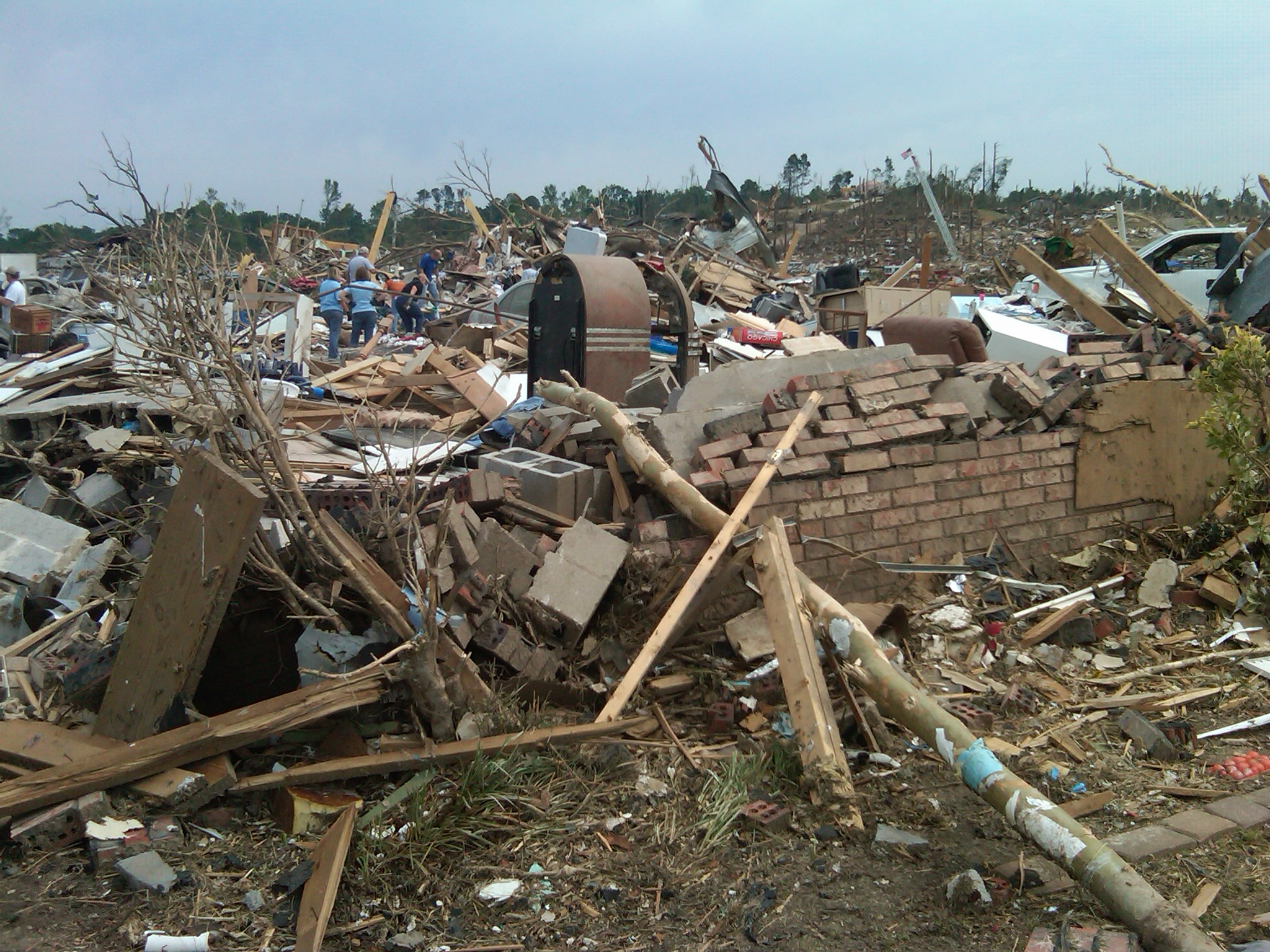
EF4 damage to a residence from the 2011 Tuscaloosa–Birmingham tornado

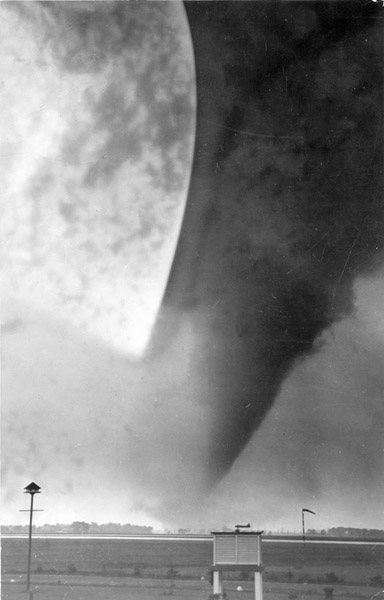
The Windsor–Tecumseh Tornado of 1946

F4/EF4 Tornadoes in the United States 1950–2019

This is a list of tornadoes which have been officially or unofficially labeled as F4, EF4, IF4, or an equivalent rating. These scales – the Fujita scale, the Enhanced Fujita scale, the International Fujita scale, and the TORRO tornado intensity scale – attempt to estimate the intensity of a tornado by classifying the damage caused to natural features and man-made structures in the tornado's path.

Tornadoes are among the most violent known meteorological phenomena. Each year, more than 2,000 tornadoes are recorded worldwide, with the vast majority occurring in North America and Europe. In order to assess the intensity of these events, meteorologist Ted Fujita devised a method to estimate maximum wind speeds within tornadic storms based on the damage caused; this became known as the Fujita scale. The scale ranks tornadoes from F0 to F5, with F0 being the least intense and F5 being the most intense. F4 tornadoes were estimated to have had maximum winds between 207 mph (333 km/h) and 260 mph (420 km/h) (Note: The winds estimated by the Fujita Scale are estimated values and have not been verified scientifically.)

Following two particularly devastating tornadoes in 1997 and 1999, engineers questioned the reliability of the Fujita scale. Ultimately, a new scale was devised that took into account 28 different damage indicators; this became known as the Enhanced Fujita scale. With building design and structural integrity taken more into account, winds in an EF4 tornado were estimated to between 166 mph (267 km/h) and 200 mph (320 km/h). The Enhanced Fujita scale is used predominantly in North America. Most of Europe, on the other hand, uses the TORRO tornado intensity scale (or T-Scale), which ranks tornado intensity between T0 and T11; F4/EF4 tornadoes are approximately equivalent to T8 to T9 on the T-Scale. Tornadoes rated IF4 on the International Fujita scale are also included on this list.

== List of F4/EF4 tornadoes ==
The most recent F4/EF4 tornado occurred on August 8, 2026, and occurred near the municipality of Piraí Do Sul, Brazil.

=== Pre-1950 ===
The National Weather Service in the United States did not rate any tornadoes prior to 1950. Other organizations like the European Severe Storms Laboratory (ESSL) and Environment and Climate Change Canada (ECCC) on the other hand, did rate tornadoes prior to 1950. The only violent tornado that impacted the United States prior to 1950 and has an official rating is the 1946 Windsor–Tecumseh tornado, which received a rating from ECCC. However, the impact to the United States remains officially unrated.

Tornadoes officially rated F4/EF4 or equivalent
| Day | Year | Country | Subdivision | Location | Fatalities | Notes | Rated by |
|---|---|---|---|---|---|---|---|
| October 23 | 1091 | UK | Greater London | London | 2 | London tornado of 1091 — A violent tornado destroyed 600 houses, damaged the Church of St Mary-le-bow, and killed two people. While this tornado did not receive a rating on a tornado intensity scale, a publication in the Journal of Meteorology by M. W. Roe described the tornado as a “violent whirlwind”, so it is believed to have been equivalent to an F4 tornado. | M. W. Roe |
| September 11 | 1535 | Poland | Lower Silesian | Oleśnica | 5 | An F4 tornado that destroyed part of the town. The written account of this tornado was done by Dr. Alfred Wegener, which is in the CLIMDAT archive located at Leipzig University. | ESSL |
| July 15 | 1582 | Germany | Thuringia | Rockhausen | 0 | This F4 tornado nearly destroyed a village, leaving only two houses that remained untouched. This may have been twin tornadoes instead of just one tornado. | ESSL |
| July 1 | 1625 | Russia | Tver Oblast | Toropets | 0 | This violent F4 tornado caused a 125 kilometres (78 mi) path of destruction, reaching a maximum width of 2,500 metres (2,700 yd). Numerous houses and churches were obliterated and numerous trees were snapped or uprooted. | ESSL |
| October 23 | 1666 | UK | Lincolnshire | 4 Villages in Lincolnshire | 3 Fatalities | A high end F4/low end F5 past through Welbourn, Wellingore, Navenby and Boothby Graffoe in Lincolnshire. Killing 3 people. Rated T8/9 by TORRO which is equivalent to F4 on the Fujita scale. Slight possibility of being an F5. | TORRO |
| May 22 | 1872 | Estonia | Historic country of Livonia | Unknown | 7 (14 injuries) | 74 farms were damaged and a church was destroyed. | Heino Tooming, ESSL (Note: Was not responsible for the rating, but is the only source for Heino Tooming's rating.) |
| September 6 | 1882 | Denmark | Silkeborg Municipality | Gødvad | 0 | The tornado destroyed an entire barn, "crushed" six strong oak half-timbered homes, destroyed turf homes, scoured an oat field, and picked up the water in a pond. "A stone house had all of its wooden roof tiles ripped off and the planks reportedly broken like glass". "Deep ground scouring" occurred in numerous places as well. | ESSL |
| July 1 | 1891 | Germany | North Rhineland | Lind, Süchteln, Anrath, Krefeld | 3 (100 injuries) | This short-lived, extremely fast-moving F4/T9 tornado destroyed the towns of Lind, Süchteln, Anrath, and Krefeld. According to the European Severe Storms Laboratory, this tornado had a path of 20 km (12.43 mi) and only was on the ground for 4 minutes, meaning the forward moving speed of this tornado was about 300.00 kilometres per hour (186.41 mph). Hail up to 8 cm (3.15 in) occurred with this tornado. | ESSL |
| May 31 | 1892 | Croatia | Sisak-Moslavina | Novska | 0 (3 injuries) | This extremely large tornado, measuring about 2,300 metres (2,500 yd) in width destroyed the Novska railway station and a 13-ton rear carriage was thrown 30 metres (33 yd) away. There were fifty passengers in the train at the time of the tornado of whom three were seriously injured. Large trees were also uprooted and debarked. | ESSL |
| September 21 | 1897 | Italy | Apulia | Oria | 55 | Houses and stone-walled buildings collapsed. The tornado's maximum width was 850 metres (930 yd) and had a path length of 36 kilometres (22 mi). | ESSL |
| July 17 | 1902 | Canada | Ontario | Chesterville, Winchester | Several | The tornado was 50–60 rods (250–300 m; 820–990 ft) wide and tore dwellings and outbuildings into pieces. | ECCC |
| June 29 | 1904 | Russia | Moscow Oblast | Moscow | 9–200 (≥93 injuries) | 1904 Moscow tornado — | ESSL |
| June 30 | 1912 | Canada | Saskatchewan | Regina | 28 (300 injuries) | Regina Cyclone – An F4 tornado that completely leveled several structures and caused others to explode as the pressure inside the structures rose when the tornado passed overhead. The tornado caused a 12 kilometres (7.5 mi) path of destruction and had an approximate width of 150 metres (490 ft). With 28 deaths, it remains Canada's deadliest tornado. | ECCC |
| November 24 | 1928 | Denmark | Southern Denmark | Hostrup, Esbjerg, Alslev | 0 | An F4 tornado that impacted Southern Denmark along a path of 4.6 kilometres (2.9 mi). Several barns were destroyed near Hostrup and gables on homes were destroyed. A home's walls were cracked in this area as well. A pump that was “deep into the ground” was ripped up and thrown 10 metres (11 yd). In the area of the pump, a “literal” two-story brick farmhouse was “erased to the ground”, which suggested F4 level intensity. | ESSL, DMI |
| July 20 | 1931 | Poland | Lublin | Lublin | 6 | 1931 Lublin tornado — This tornado is officially rated F4; however, the Polish Weather Service estimated winds at 246 to 324 mph (396 to 521 km/h), potentially ranking it as an F5. Numerous structures were "razed to the ground". | ESSL |
| July 11 | 1934 | Finland | Eastern Finland Province | Kiuruvesi | 1 | An F4 tornado devastated the city of Kiuruvesi and moved SSE to NNW. Dozens of structures were completely destroyed including around fifty properties and a 24-year-old woman was killed after she was thrown by the tornado. It is considered the northernmost F4/EF4/IF4 tornado on record as well as the strongest in Finland's history. | ESSL, FMI, NWS (Note: Was not directly responsible for the rating, but had a participate involved in an academically published paper that included the rating.) |
| May 8 | 1936 | United States | Oklahoma | Webber Falls, Gore | 2 (38 injuries) | F4 tornado moved NNE into the town of Webber Falls, passing along the SE edge of Gore. At least five homes were "completely blasted away," and two people were killed in one of them. | Grazulis |
| August 3 | 1940 | United States | North Dakota | Dawson | 3 (20 injuries) | Moved along the south edge of Dawson. Three entire farms were swept away, a couple dying in one of them. A man was killed after being hurled 200 yards with his car and "pierced with timbers." Ten buildings were torn apart on the edge of Dawson, with 20 reportedly injured. | Grazulis |
| December 26 | 1940 | Cuba | Mayabeque Province | Bejucal | 20 (100+ injuries) | The F4 tornado collapsed numerous houses and other structures. The tornado had an estimated width of 400 metres (440 yd) and an estimated windspeed of 350 kilometres per hour (220 mph). | INSMET |
| June 17 | 1946 | United States, Canada | Michigan, Ontario | River Rouge, Windsor, LaSalle, Tecumseh | 17 | 1946 Windsor–Tecumseh tornado – Officially rated F4; however, one home had a portion of its concrete block foundation swept away, indicating borderline F5 damage. The tornado knocked out power to most of Tecumseh as well. This tornado is not officially rated by the National Weather Service (NWS) in the United States as NWS did not begin to rate tornadoes until 1950, so the damage done in the United States remains unrated. | ECCC |
| March 19 | 1948 | United States | Illinois | Fosterburg, Bunker Hill, Gillespie | 33 (449 injuries) | Moved NE in the early morning from Alton, passing through and devastating the towns of Fosterburg (9 dead), Bunker Hill (19 dead), and Gillespie (5 dead). The tornado destroyed 45 homes in Fosterburg, about half of the village. About 2000 buildings, or 80% of the town of Bunker Hill, was damaged or destroyed. About 250 homes were destroyed. Another 150 homes were damaged or destroyed at Gillespie. | Grazulis |
| March 19 | 1948 | United States | Illinois | Honey Bend, Vanderville, Owaneco | 0 (2 injuries) | After a short break, the Bunker Hill tornado family continued its march to the NE. Homes and barns were destroyed near Honey Bend, and continued past Vanderville, where most damage was recorded, and came close to hitting Owaneco. The tornado continued roughly 6 miles NE before dissipating. | Grazulis |
| June 22 | 1948 | United States | Nebraska, Iowa | Talmadge, Nebraska City, Anderson | 1 (5 injuries) | Moved through open Nebraska countryside before passing near Talmage, where one person was killed in a farm house. A large part of the $450,000 loss occurred in the southern part of Nebraska City. 5 injuries were reported in Nebraska City. The tornado crossed the border into Iowa and passed near Anderson where some light damage occurred before it continued into open countryside and dissipated. Somewhere in Nebraska, it reportedly derailed some freight cars. | Grazulis |
| January 3 | 1949 | United States | Arkansas | Gravelridge, Warren | 55 (435 injuries) | Moving through rural Arkansas, the tornado passed closely by Gravelridge and continued towards the town of Warren. The tornado reached Warren at peak intensity and "wreaked havoc" on the town before lifting. 55 people died in Warren, with another 435 injured. About 120 homes were destroyed, and over 500 were damaged. | Grazulis |

=== 1950s ===
See List of F4 tornadoes (1950–1959)

=== 1960s ===
See List of F4 tornadoes (1960–1969)

=== 1980s ===
| Day | Year | Country | Subdivision | Location | Fatalities | Notes | Rated by |
|---|---|---|---|---|---|---|---|
| June 3 | 1980 | United States | Westmoreland County, Pennsylvania | Vandergrift | 0 | One of the most violent tornadoes of the Grand Island, Nebraska tornado outbreak; caused $6,000,000 in damage and injured 140 people. | |
| April 2 | 1982 | United States | Lamar County, Texas | Paris | 10 | Resulted in 170 injuries. Deadliest during the outbreak that also featured an F5 tornado over Oklahoma. | |
| May 31 | 1985 | United States | Erie County, Pennsylvania | Albion | 12 | Many homes in town were completely leveled. | |
| May 31 | 1985 | Canada | Central Ontario | Barrie | 8 | A short-lived, but devastating and violent tornado affected the City of Barrie, Ontario, Canada, causing 155 injuries and $150 million CAD in damages. | |
| May 31 | 1985 | United States | Crawford County, Pennsylvania | Atlantic | 16 | One of the deadliest in the outbreak. Atlantic was particularly hard hit from this tornado. | |
| May 22 | 1987 | United States | Reeves County, Texas | Saragosa | 30 | Mass casualties occurred in only a few structures. Homes and businesses were destroyed. The deadliest of the year. | |
| July 31 | 1987 | Canada | Alberta | Edmonton | 27 | Also known as Black Friday. Hit the city of Edmonton at F4 strength before impacting the Evergreen Mobile Home Park where a dozen casualties were located. The second deadliest tornado of Canadian history. | |
| November 15 | 1989 | United States | Madison County, Alabama | Huntsville | 21 | Also known as the Airport Road tornado, it injured 463 people. 12 deaths occurred in vehicles. | |

=== 1990s ===
| Day | Year | Country | Subdivision | Location | Fatalities | Notes | Rated by |
|---|---|---|---|---|---|---|---|
| March 13 | 1990 | United States | Dubuque County, Iowa | Worthington | 0 | Unusual warmth that day produced an F4 tornado that struck much of the Worthington area. 26 homes and businesses were damaged, 13 of them that ended up being destroyed | National Weather Service |
| March 13 | 1990 | United States | Webster County, Nebraska | Schuyler | 0 | This was either an extremely long-tracked tornado or a tornado family. Near Red Cloud, a farmhouse was completely "wiped out". The tornado moved into Nuckolls County and struck Lawrence, where 8 homes were destroyed and 45 others were damaged. Crossing into Clay County, the tornado struck Sutton, where one business was destroyed and 11 others were damaged. 49 homes in Sutton were damaged, and a truck and a police car were flipped. 20 farms were damaged in rural areas nearby. The tornado downed trees and power lines in Fillmore County before crossing into York County. A farmhouse was destroyed near McCool Junction. South of York, the tornado destroyed another farmhouse, heavily damaged a gas station and convenience store, tore the roof off of a motel, and destroyed two trucks. A dozen farms were damaged in York County, and about 10,000 geese were killed. 57 railroad cars were derailed near Waco before the tornado crossed into Seward County, where trees and power lines were damaged. The tornado then crossed into Butler County and passed near David City, impacting numerous farmsteads. 35 homes and 155 other structures were damaged or destroyed near David City, and about 1,200 livestock were killed or injured. The tornado then moved into Colfax County, damaging four farms near Schuyler before dissipating. A total of nine people were injured. | National Weather Service |
| June 1 | 1990 | United States | Pecos County, Texas | | 2 | 1990 Bakersfield Valley tornado — A large, extremely violent, multi-vortex tornado passed over rural areas of Pecos County, Texas. This tornado, which was preceded and succeeded by two smaller tornadoes, was rated as an F4. However, ground scouring, tree destruction and non-conventional damage suggests that this tornado possibly reached F5 intensity. The tornado touched down near the unincorporated town of Girvin at 4:20 pm. During the first few miles of its path, it produced mainly F0 damage. As it approached FM 1901, it rapidly grew and intensified. F3 damage was done to a Co-Op building. As the tornado grew to its maximum width of 1.3 miles, it destroyed an adobe brick house, earning an F4 rating. As it continued, a half-mile wide swath of ground scouring and a 300 foot wide strip of asphalt scouring were noted. The tornado weakened to F2 intensity, but became a killer as it tossed a dump truck and a car containing a family of four. The driver of the dump truck and the father of the family were the only fatalities recorded. The tornado then reintensified as it entered a tank battery, where it picked up two 500-barrel [oil tanks] and tossed and rolled them for three miles before rolling them 600 feet up the side of a steep hill. The tornado damaged and destroyed 57 pump jacks before lifting five miles southwest of the town of Iraan. | |

=== 2000s ===
See List of F4 and EF4 tornadoes (2000–2009)

=== 2010s ===
See List of F4 and EF4 tornadoes (2010–2019)

=== 2020s ===
See List of F4, EF4, and IF4 tornadoes (2020–present)

== Possible F4/EF4 tornadoes with no official rating or lower rating ==
Because the distinctions between tornadoes ratings are often ambiguous, the official ratings of numerous other tornadoes formally rated below F4/EF4/IF4 or equivalent have been disputed, with certain government sources or independent studies contradicting the official record. This list includes tornadoes rated F4/EF4/IF4 or equivalent by government meteorologists, non-government tornado experts (i.e. Thomas P. Grazulis or Ted Fujita) or meteorological research institutions (i.e. European Severe Storms Laboratory) that rated a tornado differently than the official government organization in charge of the rating. Published academic papers or presentations at academically held meteorological conferences that rate tornadoes as F4/EF4/IF4 or present some evidence to support damage or winds in that category are also ways a tornado can be added to this list.

=== 1870s ===
Tornado expert Thomas P. Grazulis gave F4 ratings to 48 tornadoes that occurred in the United States in the 1870s.

Possible F4/EF4 tornadoes with no official rating or lower rating
| Day | Year | Country | Subdivision | Location | Fatalities | Notes | Rated by |
|---|---|---|---|---|---|---|---|
| June 18 | 1871 | United States | Iowa | Richland Township, Guthrie County | 0 (5 injuries) | A farm house was leveled and an oven was thrown 300 yards (270 m). | Grazulis |
| May 28 | 1872 | United States | Missouri | North of Versailles | 2 (10 injuries) | Five farms were completely destroyed and more were damaged. An eyewitness stated that two funnels merged. | Grazulis |
| May 22 | 1873 | United States | Kansas | Jackonsville, Neosho County | 7 (20 injuries) | A dozen farms were destroyed, some of which "completely disappeared." | Grazulis |
| May 22 | 1873 | United States | Iowa | Lancaster, Jackson Township (Washington County), Highland Township | 8+ (30 injuries) | At least 30 farms were devastated, with debris driven 4 feet (1.2 m) into the ground at one location. The roar was heard up to 10 miles (16 km) away. | Grazulis |
| May 22 | 1873 | United States | Illinois | Warren County, Fulton County | 3 (28 injuries) | About a dozen farms were devastated with some homes reportedly swept away. | Grazulis |
| July 1 | 1873 | United States | Kansas | Galesburg, Erie | 5 (9 injuries) | Homes were destroyed in Erie and rural Neosho County. | Grazulis |
| July 3 | 1873 | United States | Illinois | Bear Creek Township | 1 (10 injuries) | Five farms were destroyed. At one site "not a stick of timber" remained in place. Witnesses initially mistook the tornado for smoke from a distant fire. | |
| November 22 | 1874 | United States | Alabama | Tuscumbia | 14 (30 injuries) | About a third of Tuscumbia was damaged or destroyed. Several people were injured when a trail derailed. | Grazulis |
| March 20 | 1875 | United States | Georgia | Harris County, Talbot County | 11+ (25 injuries) | March 1875 Southeast tornado outbreak — Several plantations were destroyed, with 11 deaths on and near one of them. As many as 15 people may have died. | Grazulis |
| March 20 | 1875 | United States | Georgia | Mount Airy (Harris County), Baughville | 9 (50 injuries) | March 1875 Southeast tornado outbreak — Six people died in one house. Baughville Academy was destroyed. | Grazulis |
| March 20 | 1875 | United States | Georgia, South Carolina | Sparta, Camak Appling (GA), Edgefield, South Carolina | 28+ (70 injuries) | March 1875 Southeast tornado outbreak — Nearly every building in Camak was damaged or destroyed. Dozens of farms were destroyed. As many as 42 people many have died. | Grazulis |
| March 20 | 1875 | United States | Georgia | Gray, Milledgeville | 13+ (30 injuries) | March 1875 Southeast tornado outbreak — One person, presumed dead was still missing when the damage survey was conducted. Witnesses mistook the tornado for a large fire. | Grazulis |
| March 20 | 1875 | United States | Alabama, Georgia | Opelika (Alabama), West Point, Whitesville | 7 (20 injuries) | March 1875 Southeast tornado outbreak — All deaths were in one family. An eyewitness account suggests this was a multiple vortex tornado. | Grazulis |
| March 20 | 1875 | United States | Georgia | Sparta, Gibson | 8+ (40 injuries) | March 1875 Southeast tornado outbreak — Some deaths, attributed to another tornado, may have been from this one. | Grazulis |
| March 20 | 1875 | United States | Georgia, South Carolina | Keysville (Georgia), Jackson New Ellenton, Williston (South Carolina) | 6+ (30 injuries) | March 1875 Southeast tornado outbreak —About 40 homes were severely damaged in Richmond County, Georgia. One other person may have died. | Grazulis |
| May 1 | 1875 | United States | Georgia | Rutledge, Maxeys, Greensboro | 7 (35 injuries) | "Prosperous" farms and a large plantation were destroyed. One house was carried 25 yards (23 m) and set down gently with the owner inside. | Grazulis |
| August 5 | 1875 | United States | Illinois | Alexis, Galesburg, Wataga | 2+ (15 injuries) | A total of 25 farm homes and many farm buildings were damaged or destroyed. Three children, reported missing, may also have died. A dead steer was carried a mile (1.6 km). | Grazulis |
| August 5 | 1875 | United States | Illinois | Knoxville, Truro Township, Millbrook Township, Jubilee Township, Radnor Township | 0 (40 injuries) | Farm homes and barns were destroyed. One child may have died. | Grazulis |
| February 27 | 1876 | United States | Indiana | Petersburg, Glezen | 1 (15 injuries) | About 30 farms were damaged, at least two of which were leveled. | Grazulis |
| March 10 | 1876 | United States | Missouri, Illinois | Elizabathtown, Hassard, Hannibal, Missouri | 14 (40 injuries) | The village of Elizabethtown was destroyed. | Grazulis |
| June 6 | 1876 | United States | Kansas | Fallon Township, Smoky View Township | 3 (13 injuries) | Fourteen farms were destroyed; one farm house was swept away. | Grazulis |
| June 6 | 1876 | United States | Kansas | Lindsborg | unknown | All buildings on two farms were destroyed. | Grazulis |
| April 18 | 1877 | United States | Tennessee | Newberg, La Vergne | 10 (50 injuries) | Much of La Vergne was destroyed. Damage was more intense in valleys then on hilltops. | Grazulis |
| June 4 | 1877 | United States | Illinois, Indiana | Mount Carmel, Illinois | 16+ (100 injuries) | Homes in Mount Carmel were swept away, and about 120 homes and businesses were destroyed. Some sources state that 30 people died. | Grazulis |
| June 30 | 1877 | United States | Indiana | Brooklyn, Waverly, Mooresville | 7+ (20 injuries) | Homes were destroyed and entire farms were swept away. Two schools were destroyed; one was carried 50 yards (46 m). | Grazulis |
| July 1 | 1877 | United States | Pennsylvania | Parkesburg, Ercildoun | 2+ (25 injuries) | Four homes were destroyed in Parkesburg and twenty buildings, including a dormitory, were destroyed in Ercildoun. Debris was carried 9 miles (14 km). | Grazulis |
| July 2 | 1877 | United States | Indiana | Baugo Township | 2+ (11 injuries) | Eight homes were destroyed, two of which were leveled. | Grazulis |
| March 2 | 1878 | United States | Kentucky | Rich Hill, Mount Olive | 8 (unknown injuries) | Homes were swept away. All seven members of one family were killed. | Grazulis |
| April 13 | 1878 | United States | Kansas | Cottonwood Falls, Cottonwood Station | 4 (35 injuries) | Cottowood Station was destroyed. In all, 25 homes were destroyed. | Grazulis |
| April 17 | 1878 | United States | Nebraska, South Dakota | Olivet, South Dakota | unknown | Houses were leveled. A wagon was carried 2 miles (3.2 km). | Grazulis |
| April 18 | 1878 | United States | Iowa | Atlantic | 1 (2 injuries) | A house was destroyed. | Grazulis |
| April 21 | 1878 | United States | Iowa | Battle Creek, Ida Grove, Eureka Township, Hayes Township, Storm Lake | 10 (40 injuries) | Structures were destroyed along the track, including 15 homes at Storm Lake. | Grazulis |
| April 21 | 1878 | United States | Iowa | Willow Creek Township, Wall Lake, Iowa, Sac City, Pomeroy | 17 (29 injuries) | Farm homes were destroyed. One house was reported carried 300 feet (91 m). This event may have been a tornado family. | Grazulis |
| May 23 | 1878 | United States | Wisconsin | Mifflin, Linden, Mineral Point, Lake Mendota | 17 (45 injuries) | Homes were destroyed as people were killed along a 55-mile (89 km) track. One person, carried by the tornado, survived by wrapping herself in a blanket. This event was likely a tornado family. | Grazulis |
| June 1 | 1878 | United States | Missouri | Richmond | 16+ (90 injuries) | About a third of Richmond was destroyed. Some newspapers give a death toll of 21. | Grazulis |
| June 1 | 1878 | United States | Iowa | Rockwell | 3 (unknown injuries) | Several buildings were destroyed. "No vestige remained" of one home. | Grazulis |
| August 9 | 1878 | United States | Connecticut | Wallingford, Durham, Killingworth, | 34 (70 injuries) | 1878 Wallingford tornado — About 35 homes were destroyed. Pieces of paper were carried 65 miles (105 km). | Grazulis |
| May 29 | 1879 | United States | Missouri | Fillmore, Barnard, Guilford, Conception, Alanthus Grove | unknown (20 injuries) | At least 15 farms were destroyed. A horse was carried 1,000 yards (0.91 km) and survived. One of the injured may have later died. | Grazulis |
| May 30 | 1879 | United States | Kansas | Westfall, Milo | 1+ (10 injuries) | Some homes were left "with only fragments remaining." One other person may have died. | Grazulis |
| May 30 | 1879 | United States | Kansas | Minneapolis, Delphos, Aurora | 4 (30 injuries) | Chickens were stripped of feathers and carried up to 3 miles (4.8 km). | Grazulis |
| May 30 | 1879 | United States | Kansas, Nebraska | Randolph, Irving (Kansas), Richardson County, Nebraska | 18 (60 injuries) | Thirty-four homes in Irving were destroyed. A cow survived being carried half a mile (0.8 km). A 100-ton iron bridge was "twisted into a shapeless ruin." May have been a tornado family. | Grazulis |
| May 30 | 1879 | United States | Missouri | West Line, Raymore, Lee's Summit | 4 (25 injuries) | A house was destroyed while a nearby chicken house was untouched. Four members of one family, caught in the open, were killed. May have been a tornado family. | Grazulis |
| May 30 | 1879 | United States | Kansas | Keats | 1 (4 injuries) | A house was destroyed with debris strewn for half a mile (0.8 km). | Grazulis |
| June 10 | 1879 | United States | Kansas | Asherville, Brittsville, Glasco | 1 (8 injuries) | Entire farms were destroyed. | Grazulis |
| July 2 | 1879 | United States | Iowa | Fredonia Township, | 2 | Six farms were destroyed. | Grazulis |
| July 2 | 1879 | United States | Minnesota | Wanamingo Township, Wastedo, Cannon Falls | 3 (8 injuries) | At least three farm houses were destroyed. All three deaths were in one home. | Grazulis |
| July 2 | 1879 | United States | Minnesota, Wisconsin | Belle Creek Township, Goodhue County, Minnesota, Vasa, Burnside Township, Diamond Bluff, Wisconsin | 11 (30 injuries) | At least 12 farms were destroyed with one house carried away. Five of the deaths were at an orphanage. | Grazulis |
| December 9 | 1879 | United States | Missouri | Renick | 1 (7 injuries) | Eight farms sustained severe damage; two were leveled. | Grazulis |
Sources: Grazulis

=== 1880s ===
Grazulis gave F4 ratings to 70 tornadoes that occurred in the United States in the 1880s, and noted one other tornado that might have caused F4 damage.

Possible F4/EF4 tornadoes with no official rating or lower rating
| Day | Year | Country | Subdivision | Location | Fatalities | Notes | Rated by |
|---|---|---|---|---|---|---|---|
| April 2 | 1880 | United States | Kansas | Girard | 4 (25 injuries) | Six farms were leveled and 17 homes sustained some manner of damage. | Grazulis |
| April 18 | 1880 | United States | Missouri | Rocky Comfort, Wheaton, McDowell, Ozark, Linden, Fordland Grovespring | 31 (100 injuries) | Tornado outbreak of April 1880 – The worst damage was north of Fordland. This tornado was on a parallel track to the Marshfield tornado, the next entry on this list, which was on the ground at the same time. | Grazulis |
| April 18 | 1880 | United States | Missouri | McDowell, Boaz, Springfield, Marshfield | 99+ (200 injuries) | Tornado outbreak of April 1880 – The greatest impact was in Marshfield, where 92 people were killed and all but 15 buildings in town were destroyed. | Grazulis |
| April 18 | 1880 | United States | Missouri | Climax Springs, Barnett, Jefferson City, New Bloomfield | 14 (90 injuries) | Tornado outbreak of April 1880 – Numerous farms were devastated. Barnettsville was rebuilt as Barnett. | Grazulis |
| April 18 | 1880 | United States | Arkansas | El Paso | 4 (15 injuries) | Tornado outbreak of April 1880 – A third of El Paso was damaged for destroyed. Three of the deaths were in one family. | Grazulis |
| April 24 | 1880 | United States | Illinois | Jerseyville, Macoupin County | 1 (10 injuries) | About 25 homes were destroyed. | Grazulis |
| April 24 | 1880 | United States | Illinois | Carlinville, Atwater | 0 (12 injuries) | Buildings were destroyed on two dozen farms; some were swept away. Trees were debarked. | Grazulis |
| April 25 | 1880 | United States | Mississippi | Macon | 22 (72 injuries) | Homes were swept away and loaded freight cars were thrown 100 yards. | Grazulis |
| May 10 | 1880 | United States | Illinois | Alsey, Pisgah | 7 (18 injuries) | Thirty buildings were destroyed. A body was carried a quarter mile (0.4 km). | Grazulis |
| May 28 | 1880 | United States | Texas | Savoy | 14 (60 injuries) | The business district and northeast section of Savoy were leveled. | Grazulis |
| June 9 | 1880 | United States | Iowa | Macedonia, Iowa, Grove Township | 7 (20 injuries) | Eight houses were destroyed, two of which were completely blown away. One was carried away while a nearby fence was undamaged. | Grazulis |
| June 14 | 1880 | United States | Indiana | Fountaintown, Morristown, Carthage, Rushville | 4+ (20 injuries) | Seven farm houses were swept away. | Grazulis |
| June 9 | 1881 | United States | Kansas | Solomon Rapids, Kansas, Beloit | 5 (30 injuries) | Farms were destroyed along most of the path. | Grazulis |
| June 11 | 1881 | United States | Iowa | Norwalk, Avon, Colfax | 2 (6 injuries) | Tornado outbreak of June 1881 – Two homes were completely blown away. Water from the Des Moines River was lifted 100 feet (30 m) in the air. | Grazulis |
| June 12 | 1881 | United States | Kansas | Floral | 3 (22 injuries) | Tornado outbreak of June 1881 – Twenty-eight homes were destroyed, many of which were leveled. | Grazulis |
| June 12 | 1881 | United States | Missouri | Burlington, Clearmont | 2 (15 injuries) | Tornado outbreak of June 1881 – Two farms were swept away. May have been F5. | Grazulis |
| June 12 | 1881 | United States | Kansas | Olviet, Melvern, Quenemo, Richter | 5 (40 injuries) | Tornado outbreak of June 1881 – Fifty homes and barns were destroyed. | Grazulis |
| June 12 | 1881 | United States | Missouri | Fillmore, Flag Springs, King City | 5 (20 injuries) | Tornado outbreak of June 1881 – Eighty buildings were destroyed and many livestock were killed. | Grazulis |
| June 28 | 1881 | United States | Iowa | Cherokee | 3 (20 injuries) | Homes were swept away. | Grazulis |
| July 15 | 1881 | United States | Minnesota | Odessa, Fairfield, Correll | 4 (15 injuries) | Multiple farms were leveled. | Grazulis |
| July 15 | 1881 | United States | Minnesota | Bird Island, Cairo Township, Wellington Township, West Newton, New Ulm | 20 (93 injuries) | This event was a complex tornado family rather than a single tornado. Five entire farms were swept away and 47 homes were destroyed in New Ulm. Grazulis applied a conservative F4 rating, but notes that it probably reached F5 intensity. | Grazulis |
| April 5 | 1882 | United States | Kansas | Raymond, Chase | 4 (30 injuries) | About half of Chase was destroyed. | Grazulis |
| April 6 | 1882 | United States | Michigan | Kendall, Alamo, Hickory Corners | 1 (10 injuries) | Nine farms were damaged or destroyed | Grazulis |
| April 6 | 1882 | United States | Michigan | Bedford, Assyria Township, Kalamo | 4 (25 injuries) | About a dozen homes were destroyed in Kalamo. At least 20 farms were damaged. | Grazulis |
| April 6 | 1882 | United States | Michigan | Hartland, West Highland, Clyde | 3 (3 injuries) | Five homes were destroyed. | Grazulis |
| April 22 | 1882 | United States | Mississippi | Monticello | 10 (100 injuries) | All but three homes in Monticello were destroyed. Half the town's population was injured. | Grazulis |
| April 22 | 1882 | United States | Georgia | Macon, Griswoldville Gordon | 2 (10 injuries) | Several homes were leveled. At least one well-built house was destroyed. | Grazulis |
| June 17 | 1882 | United States | Iowa | Ogden, Nevada | 1 (5 injuries) | A few farms were leveled. This tornado moved on a track parallel to a far deadlier F5 tornado that devastated Grinell during the same outbreak. | Grazulis |
| June 21 | 1882 | United States | Iowa | Primghar, Peterson | 5 (50 injuries) | At least 50 buildings were destroyed on 20 farms and in the town of Primghar. | Grazulis |
| June 25 | 1882 | United States | Nebraska | Brainard, Wahoo | 2 (2 injuries) | One farm was leveled and many others sustained F3 damage. | Grazulis |
| April 21 | 1883 | United States | Iowa | Dunlap, Woodbine | 2 (10 injuries) | One home was leveled. | Grazulis |
| April 22 | 1883 | United States | Mississippi | Brookhaven, Wesson, Beauregard, Georgetown | 56+ (300 injuries) | All of Beauregard and a large portion of Wesson were destroyed. The combined death toll of this and the Americus, Georgia tornado (listed below) may have been more than 100. | Grazulis |
| April 22 | 1883 | United States | Georgia | Plains, Americus | 10+ (80 injuries) | Large homes were leveled with four people killed in one home. | Grazulis |
| April 23 | 1883 | United States | Georgia | Albany, Isabella | 8 (50 injuries) | Three plantations were hit, with both tenant homes and main homes destroyed. | Grazulis |
| April 27 | 1883 | United States | Texas | Belton, Heidenheimer | 5 (30 injuries) | Three homes were swept away and scattered for miles. | Grazulis |
| May 14 | 1883 | United States | Indiana, Michigan | Vistula (Indiana), Sturgis, Burr Oak (Michigan) | 1 (10 injuries) | Twenty farms were hit, with homes and barns destroyed. | Grazulis |
| May 18 | 1883 | United States | Illinois, Wisconsin | Capron, Alden (Illinois) | 4 (15 injuries) | Homes and barns were destroyed with "only fragments to show that any structure once stood there." | Grazulis |
| May 18 | 1883 | United States | Illinois | Whitehall, Greasy Prairie, Roodhouse | 8 (50 injuries) | Greasy Prairie was destroyed with some homes partially swept away. | Grazulis |
| May 18 | 1883 | United States | Wisconsin | Brighton, Racine, Lake Michigan | 8 (85 injuries) | Fifty-eight homes in Racine were destroyed and two farm homes were swept away. An eyewitness described the tornado's multiple vortex structure as it moved over Lake Michigan. | Grazulis |
| May 18 | 1883 | United States | Illinois | Springfield, Dawson, Buffalo, Mount Pulaski, Latham | 11 (50 injuries) | Many farms were leveled. Large timbers were carried half a mile and embedded 10 feet (3 m) in the ground. | Grazulis |
| May 18 | 1883 | United States | Illinois | Jacksonville, Literberry, Philadelphia | 12 (50 injuries) | All of Literberry was destroyed. | Grazulis |
| May 18 | 1883 | United States | Illinois | Shipman, Plainview | 5 (30 injuries) | A large home was leveled, with three deaths inside. | Grazulis |
| May 28 | 1883 | United States | Indiana | Clay City, Patricksburg | 5+ (8 injuries) | At least four homes were swept away. There were unconfirmed rumors for two additional deaths. | Grazulis |
| July 21 | 1883 | United States | Minnesota | Dodge Center, Kasson, Byron, Douglas | 3 (30 injuries) | Two of "the finest homes in the county" and six farms were leveled. This event likely consisted of at least two separate tornadoes. | Grazulis |
| July 23 | 1883 | United States | Michigan | Eaton Rapids, Onondaga, Leslie | 3+ (15 injuries) | One house was destroyed with debris scattered for 3 miles (5 km). One other person may have died. About 60 sheep were killed. | Grazulis |
| February 19 | 1884 | United States | Alabama | Oxmoor, Leeds, Branchville | 13+ (30 injuries) | Enigma tornado outbreak – Thirty-six homes, many of them brick, were destroyed. Some foundations were reportedly blown away. Five other people may have died. | Grazulis |
| February 19 | 1884 | United States | Georgia | Cartersville, Waleska, Jasper, Cagle, Tate | 22 (100 injuries) | Enigma tornado outbreak – Many large homes were leveled or swept away. Bodies were carried half a mile (0.8 km). | Grazulis |
| February 19 | 1884 | United States | Alabama, Georgia | Jacksonville, Germania, Piedmont, Grantville, Goshen, Ladiga Adelia, Amberson, Rock Run (Alabama), Cave Spring (Georgia) | 30+ (100 injuries) | Enigma tornado outbreak – Some homes were swept away. A school was destroyed. Six of the injured may later have died. | Grazulis |
| February 19 | 1884 | United States | North Carolina | Pee Dee, Philadelphia, Johnsonville | 23+ (100 injuries) | Enigma tornado outbreak – Philadelphia was "obliterated." Reports did not follow the fate of the injured. | Grazulis |
| July 21 | 1884 | United States | South Dakota, Minnesota | Dell Rapids (South Dakota), Adrian | 4+ (15 injuries) | Whole farms were swept away. | Grazulis |
| August 28 | 1884 | United States | South Dakota | Forestburg, Long Lake | 1 (1 injury) | At least one home was blown away. This event was captured in what is widely reported as the first-ever photograph of a tornado. However, another tornado was photographed 4 months earlier near Garnett, Kansas. | Grazulis |
| August 28 | 1884 | United States | South Dakota | Alexandria | 4 (unknown injuries) | One farm was completely swept away, with four people and all livestock on the farm killed. | Grazulis |
| September 9 | 1884 | United States | Minnesota, Wisconsin | Marine (Minnesota), Clear Lake, Star Prairie (Wisconsin) | 4 (75 injuries) | Several farms were destroyed and two people died in the destruction of a store. This event was a tornado family rather than a single tornado. | Grazulis |
| January 11 | 1885 | United States | Alabama | Centerville, Jemison | 2 (20 injuries) | Large homes were swept away and large swaths of trees were leveled. This event was likely a tornado family. | Grazulis |
| June 12 | 1885 | United States | Iowa | Grove Township, Roscoe Township | 3 (10 injuries) | Two farms were completely swept sway. | Grazulis |
| November 6 | 1885 | United States | Alabama | Selma, Plantersville | 13 (400 injuries) | Many poorly built homes were blown away. Trees were debarked. Crops were pulled out of the ground. | Grazulis |
| April 14 | 1886 | United States | Iowa | Griswold, Atlantic, Brayton, Coon Rapids | 3 (18 injuries) | 1886 St. Cloud–Sauk Rapids tornado outbreak – About 70 farms houses were damaged or destroyed; some were completely swept off their foundations. A train was derailed, with the front cars thrown southward and the rear cars thrown northward while a car in the middle remained on the tracks. | Grazulis |
| April 14 | 1886 | United States | Minnesota | St. Cloud, Sauk Rapids, Rice | 72 (213 injuries) | 1886 St. Cloud–Sauk Rapids tornado outbreak – Homes were swept away in St. Cloud, where 24 people died. Another 37 were killed in Sauk Rapids. Eleven died at a wedding party near Rice. The bottom of the Mississippi River was reportedly exposed. | Grazulis |
| April 14 | 1886 | United States | Minnesota | Little Rock, Buckman, Pierz Township | 2 (7 injuries) | 1886 St. Cloud–Sauk Rapids tornado outbreak – Two farms were entirely swept away. | Grazulis |
| April 14 | 1886 | United States | Missouri | Mound City, Skidmore, Burlington Junction | 6 (20 injuries) | 1886 St. Cloud–Sauk Rapids tornado outbreak – Four farm homes were leveled. | Grazulis |
| April 14 | 1886 | United States | Texas | Rhome | 0 (13 injuries) | 1886 St. Cloud–Sauk Rapids tornado outbreak – Grazulis assigned an F3 rating but states that farms were "reportedly swept away in F4 or F5 fashion," but that there was not enough information to assign an F4 rating. One of the injured may later have died. | Grazulis |
| May 12 | 1886 | United States | Illinois, Indiana | Armstrong, Alvin, Potomac, Rossville (Illinois) | 3 (10 injuries) | Two farm homes were swept away. | Grazulis |
| May 12 | 1886 | United States | Indiana | Williamsport, Attica | 4 (20 injuries) | Thirty-five homes were destroyed in Attica. Witnesses reported that the tornado exposed the bottom of the Wabash River. | Grazulis |
| May 12 | 1886 | United States | Ohio | Carpenter | 2 (3 injuries) | A large farm house was destroyed. | Grazulis |
| May 12 | 1886 | United States | Indiana, Ohio | Redkey Portland (Indiana), Fort Recovery, Wabash, Celina (Ohio) | 6 (20 injuries) | Farm houses were destroyed in both states. Most of the deaths were in farm houses that were leveled near Celina. There were reports of a large rafter carried 4 miles (6 km). | Grazulis |
| April 21 | 1887 | United States | Kansas, Missouri | Colony, Lone Elm, Kincaid, Blue Mound, Prescott (Kansas), Hume, Sprague, Rich Hill (Missouri) | 21+ (250 injuries) | About two thirds of Prescott, Kansas, where at least 12 people died, was damaged or destroyed. Farms were leveled in both Kansas and Missouri. | Grazulis |
| April 21 | 1887 | United States | Missouri | Metz, Schell City | 3 (20 injuries) | At least 10 farm homes were destroyed. | Grazulis |
| April 22 | 1887 | United States | Illinois, Indiana | Bellmont, Mount Carmel (Illinois), Buena Vista (Indiana) | 5 (15 injuries) | Eight of the ten homes in Buena Vista were destroyed. | Grazulis |
| February 19 | 1888 | United States | Illinois | Vernon | 24 (80 injuries) | In places, the tornado left "no vestige of the shape of a building." About 350 homes and businesses were damaged or destroyed. | Grazulis |
| May 6 | 1889 | United States | Kansas | Pratt, Stafford | 3 (30 injuries) | Five farmhouses, a school, and a church were destroyed and at least two farms were entirely swept away. | Grazulis |
| May 28 | 1889 | United States | Kansas | Clements | 2 (4 injuries) | Ten farms were hit. Every building was blown away at one farm. | Grazulis |
Sources: Grazulis

=== 1890s ===
Possible F4/EF4 tornadoes with no official rating or lower rating
| Day | Year | Country | Subdivision | Location | Fatalities | Notes | Rated by |
|---|---|---|---|---|---|---|---|
| February 12 | 1890 | United States | Missouri, Kentucky | New Madrid (Missouri), Clinton (Kentucky) | 11 (53 injuries) | The tornado destroyed 75 buildings, including 55 homes, in Clinton with some small homes blown away. | Grazulis |
| March 27 | 1890 | United States | Missouri, Illinois | Shawneetown (Missouri), Grand Tower, Poplar Ridge, Carbondale (Illinois) | 7 (80 injuries) | Tornado outbreak of March 27, 1890 – Homes were leveled and swept away. Twenty-seven homes were destroyed in Grand Tower. | Grazulis |
| March 27 | 1890 | United States | Missouri, Illinois | Thebes (Missouri), Mill Creek, Mount Pleasant (Illinois) | 2 (30 injuries) | Tornado outbreak of March 27, 1890 – A few dozen farm homes and a school were destroyed. Chairs were carried 2 miles (3 km). | Grazulis |
| March 27 | 1890 | United States | Kentucky, Illinois | Metropolis, Bay City (Illinois), Blackford, Dixon, Sebree, Delaware, West Louisville (Kentucky) | 21+ (200 injuries) | Tornado outbreak of March 27, 1890 – About 100 homes were damaged or destroyed in Metropolis, Illinois where water blown from the Ohio River reported reached rooftops. There were five deaths each in two families. Many deaths could not be confirmed and the death toll may have exceeded 31. The track crossed the Kentucky/Illinois state line twice and may have started in Missouri. It was likely a tornado family. | Grazulis |
| March 27 | 1890 | United States | Kentucky, Indiana | Shively, Louisville (Kentucky), Jeffersonville (Indiana) | 76 (200 injuries) | Tornado outbreak of March 27, 1890 – Homes were leveled in Shivley and multi-story buildings were destroyed in downtown Louisville. | Grazulis |
| March 27 | 1890 | United States | Kentucky | Hartford, Sulphur Springs, Falls of Rough, Rineyville | 7 (40 injuries) | Tornado outbreak of March 27, 1890 – Farm communities were destroyed and homes reportedly vanished. | Grazulis |
| May 4 | 1890 | United States | Texas | Indian Gap | 0 (0 injuries) | Ten homes were leveled, but residents were able to take shelter in time because the large funnel was highly visible. There were rumors that a traveler was killed. | Grazulis |
| May 9 | 1890 | United States | Missouri | Albany, Martinsville, Blythedale | 4 (20 injuries) | Twenty homes were destroyed. This event was likely a family of two tornadoes. | Grazulis |
| June 3 | 1890 | United States | Nebraska | Bradshaw | 7+ (40 injuries) | All businesses and most homes in Bradshaw were damaged or destroyed. There were rumors of 10 additional deaths. | Grazulis |
| June 4 | 1890 | United States | Iowa | Vincent, Thor, Renwick | 0 (2 injuries) | Grazulis assigned a conservative F3 rating, but states that damage could probably be rated F4. Two homes were destroyed and trees were debarked. One rumored death could not be confirmed. | Grazulis |
| June 20 | 1890 | United States | Illinois | Amboy, Sublette, Illinois, West Brooklyn, Compton, Paw Paw | 13 (60 injuries) | At least 30 homes were destroyed and a school was leveled; six students and a teacher were killed. | Grazulis |
| July 22 | 1890 | United States | Minnesota | Taunton, Ghent | 1+ (5 injuries) | Two farms were destroyed and chickens were carried more than 2 miles (3 km). One other person may have died. | Grazulis |
| May 20 | 1891 | United States | Missouri | Sturgeon, Centralia, Mexico, Rush Hill, Laddonia | 4 (35 injuries) | 1891 Missouri tornado – Homes were leveled, trees were debarked, and water was reportedly emptied from wells. There may have been a 9-mile (14 km) break in the path. | Grazulis |
| March 31 | 1892 | United States | Kansas | South Haven, Wellington | 7+ (40 injuries) | Farms were destroyed. Four or five people died in one family when a reaper was thrown into a house | Grazulis |
| March 31 | 1892 | United States | Kansas | Rose Hill, Towanda, DeGraff | 9+ (60 injuries) | Towanda was destroyed. There were unconfirmed reports of additional deaths. | Grazulis |
| March 31 | 1892 | United States | Kansas | Wamego, Louisville | 5 (10 injuries) | A large home was leveled, resulting in four deaths. Elsewhere, one body was reportedly carried half a mile (0.8 km) | Grazulis |
| May 12 | 1892 | United States | Oklahoma | Aaron, Altus | 5+ (25 injuries) | Two farms were completely swept away. One report stated that six people died. | Grazulis |
| May 27 | 1892 | United States | Kansas | Attica, Kellogg, Harper, Wellington | 17 (100 injuries) | Many farms and a large section of Wellington were leveled. Many deaths were in the destruction of a hotel in Wellington. | Grazulis |
| May 31 | 1892 | United States | Texas | Troy, Durango | 10 (20 injuries) | Nine people died in a single home that was blown away. One person in the house survived. | Grazulis |
| December 6 | 1892 | United States | Texas | Atlanta, Queen City | 1 (25 injuries) | Farm houses and barns were blown away. The fatality was a child who was carried a quarter mile (0.4 km). | Grazulis |
| March 3 | 1893 | United States | Georgia | Odessadale, Greenville | 8 (50 injuries) | All but three homes were destroyed in Odessadale and about 200 buildings were damaged or destroyed on the north side of Greenville, where six people were killed. | Grazulis |
| April 11 | 1893 | United States | Missouri | Lenox, Bangert, Dry Fork, Jadwin | 12 (40 injuries) | Seven people died in homes swept away in Conroy, north of Salem, and four died in Jadwin. | Grazulis |
| April 11 | 1893 | United States | Missouri | Mayview, Dover | 6 (20 injuries) | Farms were swept away with deaths in two homes. | Grazulis |
| April 25 | 1893 | United States | Oklahoma | Langston, Perkins, Ripley, Oklahoma | 4 (25 injuries) | About 100 buildings were destroyed. Two people died in Langston and two in "Cimarron," which is a separate community from Cimarron City. | Grazulis |
| April 25 | 1893 | United States | Oklahoma | Newcastle, Moore | 31 (100 injuries) | At least 30 lightly built homes were swept away with 11 deaths in one home, 6 in another, and 4 in another. The tornado was reportedly over 1.25 miles (2.01 km) wide. It was the first of several intense tornadoes to strike Moore. One death from this event may have been from another tornado, and another death may have been from hail. | Grazulis |
| April 25 | 1893 | United States | Texas, Oklahoma | Bonita (Texas) | 1 (11 injuries) | Nine homes were destroyed, two of which were leveled. All known damage was in Texas. | Grazulis |
| April 28 | 1893 | United States | Oklahoma | Red Rock | 6 (20 injuries) | All deaths were in two homes in "Ponca," 12 miles south of the current location of Ponca City, Oklahoma. | Grazulis |
| April 28 | 1893 | United States | Texas | Cisco | 23+ (150 injuries) | Every building in Cisco was severely damage or destroyed, leaving 1,500 people with no shelter of any kind. Only two buildings were left standing in downtown. An entire fully loaded freight train was thrown 80–120 feet (25–35 m). As many as 26 people may have died. | Grazulis |
| June 21 | 1893 | United States | Kansas | Perry, Williamstown | 11 (30 injuries) | Thirty homes were severely damaged or destroyed, including six farm houses that were swept away. Six of nine people died in one family, with some bodies dismembered. | Grazulis |
| March 17 | 1894 | United States | Texas | Emory | 4 (50 injuries) | Four homes and a bridge were swept away and every home west of the courthouse in Emory was damaged. Witnesses described the funnel as "forked at the bottom," indicating this was probably a multiple-vortex tornado. | Grazulis |
| May 5 | 1894 | United States | Iowa | Iconium | 1 (5 injuries) | Five homes and a church were leveled. Three train cars loaded with coal were thrown 25 yards. | Grazulis |
| May 17 | 1894 | United States | Ohio | Montpelier, Kunkle | 4 (5 injuries) | A few homes were swept away; all four deaths were in one home. One body was carried a quarter mile (400 m). The roar was heard several miles way. | Grazulis |
| June 27 | 1894 | United States | Minnesota | Cosmos, Litchfield | 2 (6 injuries) | Grazulis assigned an F3 rating, but stated that damage to some farms may have been greater than F3. | Grazulis |
| September 21 | 1894 | United States | Iowa | Wesley, Hayfield, Hanlontown | 25+ (60 injuries) | This and the next two entries were part of a complex outbreak, and the number and exact sequence of individual tornadoes are unclear. Grazulis assigned an F5 rating to an earlier member of the sequence. Dozens of farms were badly damaged or destroyed, with at least 10 completely leveled. | Grazulis |
| September 21 | 1894 | United States | Iowa, Minnesota | Mason City, Osage (Iowa), Leroy, Spring Valley (Minnesota) | 16+ (70 injuries) | Farm houses were destroyed in Iowa. A total of 80 buildings were damaged or destroyed in Leroy and another 10 homes were destroyed in Spring Valley. | Grazulis |
| September 21 | 1894 | United States | Iowa | Osage, Elma | 5 (25 injuries) | Five homes were destroyed in the Lowther area, north of Elma. | Grazulis |
Sources: Grazulis

=== 1910s ===
Possible F4/EF4 tornadoes with no official rating or lower rating
| Day | Year | Country | Subdivision | Location | Fatalities | Notes | Rated by |
|---|---|---|---|---|---|---|---|
| May 30 | 1917 | United States | Missouri | Carter, Wayne, Butler, Bollinger | 18 (200+ injuries) | A tornado hit the southeast Missouri counties of Carter, Wayne, and Butler, causing 18 deaths and 200 injuries along its 50-mile path. It virtually leveled the town of Dongola in Bollinger County and caused considerable damage on the south edge of Zalma. | Grazulis |

=== 1920s ===
Possible F4/EF4 tornadoes with no official rating or lower rating
| Day | Year | Country | Subdivision | Location | Fatalities | Notes | Rated by |
|---|---|---|---|---|---|---|---|
| August 10 | 1924 | United States | Colorado | Thurman | 11 (1 indirect, 7 injuries) | A tornado formed to the west-southwest of Thurman and passed to the south of the town. A barn in the tornado's path was destroyed while 18 people were inside. 10 people were killed, 9 of which were children. Another person died four months later of injuries sustained from the tornado. This tornado remains the deadliest tornado in Colorado state history. | Grazulis |

=== 1930s ===
Possible F4/EF4 tornadoes with no official rating or lower rating
| Day | Year | Country | Subdivision | Location | Fatalities | Notes | Rated by |
|---|---|---|---|---|---|---|---|
| May 6 | 1930 | United States | Texas | Runge, Kenedy, Frost | >77 (260 injuries) | One tornado tore through three counties in north Texas, devastating several farms near Bynum and Mertens, killing 16. The tornado then moved through Frost, killing at least 22 and destroying the town. Other fatalities were reported south of Rankin, south of Bardwell and near Ensign. This tornado was on the ground for 35 miles and was 500 yd (457 m) wide. A second tornado touched down in southern Texas, destroying homes of Mexican tenant workers near Kenedy, Runge and Nordheim, killing 36. Both tornadoes were later rated F4. | Grazulis |

=== 1940s ===
Possible F4/EF4 tornadoes with no official rating or lower rating
| Day | Year | Country | Subdivision | Location | Fatalities | Notes | Rated by |
|---|---|---|---|---|---|---|---|
| April 30 | 1940 | United States | Illinois | Alexander, Pulaski, Cache | 1 (9 injuries) | A possible F4 tornado hit Alexander and Pulaski counties in Illinois. It moved northeast near Cache, passing across the north side of Mounds along its 13-mile path. Three homes were leveled in total, killing 1 and severely injuring 9. | Grazulis |
| June 23 | 1944 | United States | West Virginia | Wetzel, Marion, Harrison, Taylor, Barbour, Tucker, Randolph | 100+ (381+ injuries) (Note: Estimates for fatalities range from 100 to 153.) | Shinnston tornado — The strongest and deadliest tornado in West Virginia history. Created "indescribable havoc" as the town of Shinnston was devastated with many well-built structures completely swept away. | Grazulis |
| February 12 | 1945 | United States | Alabama | York, Livingston | 11 (63 injuries) | Tornado outbreak of February 12, 1945 — | Grazulis |

=== 1950–present ===
Possible F4/EF4 tornadoes with no official rating or different rating
| Day | Year | Country | Subdivision | Location | Fatalities | Notes | Rated by |
|---|---|---|---|---|---|---|---|
| August 7 | 1950 | Germany | Rhineland-Palatinate | Andernach | 0 | Swirling utility poles marked the devastating path of the natural event. Heavy trunks had been swirled hundreds of meters away. Considerable damage occurred on a chicken farm and the beets were torn out of a field, meaning it was "probably F3 or F4 tornado?" | ESSL |
| June 8 | 1951 | United States | Oklahoma | Corn | 0 | 1951 Corn tornado — This is event is officially documented as a single F3 tornado, but photographs showed that there were actually two slow-moving tornadoes from one storm. Grazulis rated the larger one that hit Corn F4. It destroyed 25 homes and 22 farm buildings, damaged 80 additional homes and buildings, and killed 26 heads of hogs and cattle and 1,650 chickens. Objects picked up by the tornado was carried as far as 90 miles (140 km) away. Ample warning prior to the storm striking the towns resulted in no casualties from this tornado. This tornado was the first in the United States to be caught on film and was also one of the most photographed tornadoes in Oklahoma at the time. Grazulis rated the second tornado, which destroyed several barns before dissipating west of Corn, F2 and noted that it may have been anticyclonic. | Grazulis |
| June 27 | 1951 | United States | Illinois | Heman | 0 | Tornado outbreak sequence of June 25–27, 1951 – The tornado is officially rated F3. Grazulis also rated the tornado F3, but noted that it caused "probable F4 damage." Two entire farms were "wiped out" near Heman. | Grazulis |
| April 9 | 1953 | United States | Indiana | Newtown | 3 | The tornado is officially listed as a long-tracked F3 tornado, but it is listed by Grazulis as family of four tornadoes, the second of which he rated F4 based on the damage done north of Newtown. | Grazulis |
| April 9 | 1953 | United States | Indiana | Fairview | 3 | The tornado is officially listed as a long-tracked F3 tornado, but it is listed by Grazulis as family of four tornadoes, the fourth of which he rated F4 based on the damage done near Fairview. Official records do not bring the tornado into Randolph County, where the damage reportedly took place. | Grazulis |
| May 9 | 1953 | United States | Nebraska | Hebron | 5 | 1953 Waco tornado outbreak – The tornado is officially listed as an F3 and Grazulis also rated it F3. However, he noted that F4 damage may have occurred outside of Hebron where two of 13 homes were described as "leveled." The top of Hebron High School was also torn off. | Grazulis |
| May 10 | 1953 | United States | Wisconsin | Amery | 4 | 1953 Waco tornado outbreak – This is officially listed as a long-tracked F2 tornado, but was more likely a family of tornadoes according to Grazulis, who rated the tornado F4 based on a swath of severe damage from east of New Richmond to near Amery. In all, 113 homes were damaged or destroyed and 215 other structures were affected by this tornado according to reports from local staff of the American Red Cross, although damage outside of the most severe damage in Amery was in sparsely populated areas and not well documented. | Grazulis |
| April 5 | 1954 | United States | Missouri, Iowa | Siam (IA) | 0 | Official records list the storm as an F2 tornado, but it was rated F4 by Grazulis. At least two farm homes were leveled and swept away. The track of the tornado is incorrectly listed in the NCEI as only being in Taylor County, Iowa. | Grazulis |
| June 20 | 1957 | United States | Minnesota | Glyndon, Riverton | 0 | Tornado outbreak sequence of June 20–23, 1957 – Three farms were destroyed with near-F5 damage to one home. Officially, this storm is listed as part of the track of the F5 tornado that hit Fargo, North Dakota, but a study by Fujita found the track to be a five-member tornado family, of which the Fargo tornado was the third and this one was the fourth. | Fujita, Grazulis |
| Jun 6 | 1963 | United States | South Dakota | near Martin | 0 | Produced possible F5 damage over farmland north of Martin according to Grazulis, who rated the tornado as an F4. A church "disappeared" and one home "seemed to evaporate into the air." This tornado is listed as only F3 in the official database. | Grazulis |
| Mar 24 | 1969 | United States | Virginia | near South Boston | 1 (4 injuries) | A six-room farmhouse was leveled, its debris strewn for acres. This tornado is listed as only F3 in the official database, but was rated F4 by Grazulis. | Grazulis |
| Jul 16 | 1979 | United States | Wyoming | Cheyenne | 1 (40 injuries) | F4 damage occurred to the Buffalo Ridge subdivision and Shannon Heights Trailer Park of Cheyenne, with a 220 m (720 ft) wide swath of F4 damage being reported at the latter, as the tornado neared the end of its life. | Parker and Hickey of NWS Cheyenne |
| Dec 11 | 1990 | Japan | Chiba Prefecture | Mobara | 1 (73 injuries) | A house was lifted off its foundation and disintegrated, and steel rods at a construction site were bent down to the ground. Video analysis indicated wind speeds of 93 m/s (208 mph; 335 km/h) at 120 metres (390 ft) above ground level. Fujita's analysis would make this the first record of an F4 tornado in Japan. | Fujita |
| Sep 30 | 1991 | Brazil | São Paulo | Itu | 16 (>300 injuries) | Narrow tornado. Many well-built masonry cement/concrete homes were completely leveled. Cars were thrown long distances and mangled beyond recognition, and trees were intensely debarked and uprooted. A large bus was thrown several yards, killing several people. Officially rated F3, but new analysis suggests high-end F4 damage. | State University of Campinas |
| Aug 29 | 2005 | Brazil | Rio Grande do Sul | Muitos Capões | 0 (~16 injuries) | Officially rated F3 by MetSul Meteorologia, but it was noted that F4 damage may have occurred. A car was thrown hundred of yards and was completely mutilated, to almost being unrecognizable. Thick-walled masonry homes were completely destroyed, with many of them being completely leveled, and trees were severely debarked. Granulation of debris was also confirmed. | MetSul Meteorologia |
| Jan 18 | 2007 | Germany | Brandenburg | Lauchhammer | 0 (1 injury) | A long-tracked tornado which was officially rated high-end F3/T7 hit multiple villages in eastern Germany. Four buildings were levelled completely in Kahla, and surveyors noted possible T8 damage in some locations, which equals F4 damage. | ESSL |
| May 3 | 2013 | Italy | Emilia-Romagna | San Giorgio di Piano area | 0 (3 injuries) | It was noted that F4 damage may have occurred to a largely destroyed concrete agricultural building, but due to uncertainties it was ultimately rated high-end F3. | ESSL, MeteoNetwork Pretemp |
| May 28 | 2013 | United States | Kansas | near Bennington | 0 | Tornado outbreak of May 26–31, 2013 – A large, very slow-moving, and erratic wedge tornado remained over mostly farm lands. Numerous outbuildings were destroyed, farm equipment was damaged, and power poles and trees were downed. It was initially rated EF4 based on DOW wind measurements showing that tornado had winds in the EF4-EF5 range, but was downgraded since none of the damage indicators were over EF3. However, it was acknowledged that the tornado was likely at least EF4 intensity at some point in its life. | NCEI |
| May 16 | 2015 | United States | Texas, Oklahoma | Hardeman, Wilbarger (Texas), Jackson (Oklahoma), Tillman, Kiowa | 0 | Multiple-vortex wedge tornado. Metal buildings, outbuildings, and trees sustained major damage or were destroyed. Power poles were broken and a few homes were damaged as well. According to the National Centers for Environmental Information, video and radar evidence suggest that this was likely a violent (EF4 or stronger) tornado over a sparsely populated area. | NCEI |
| April 13 | 2019 | United States | Mississippi | Greenwood Springs | 0 | Tornado outbreak of April 13–15, 2019 – This EF2 tornado tracked through wooded areas and downed numerous trees. A few homes sustained roof damage as well. In a later analysis published in the Monthly Weather Review, it was noted that, "this tornado produced forest devastation and electrical infrastructure damage up to at least EF4 intensity" with winds up to 182 mph. | Anthony W. Lyza, Barrett T. Goudeau, Kevin R. Knupp |
| March 22 | 2022 | United States | Louisiana | Gretna, Arabi, New Orleans | 2 | Tornado outbreak of March 21–23, 2022#Gretna–Arabi–New Orleans East, Louisiana – A study published in the Journal of Structural Engineering in 2024 about the performance of hurricane-resistant structures in this EF3 tornado discovered failure points of damaged structures suggesting high-end EF3 to EF4 peak intensity. | American Society of Civil Engineers |
| June 22 | 2026 | Russia | Sverdlovsk Oblast | Kushva | 0 | 2026 Kushva tornado — A single-story log cabin was completely destroyed with foundation elements removed. The cabin was renovated in 2021, the walls were in good condition, the frame was securely anchored, and the house's brick-and-concrete foundation was deeply recessed into the ground. The tornado officially received a rating of IF3 by the ESSL. However, local Russian surveyors noted further review of this structure in addition to the movement of heavy debris and severe soil erosion supported an upgrade to F4. | Igor Azhigov |

== See also ==
- List of North American tornadoes and tornado outbreaks
  - List of F5, EF5, and IF5 tornadoes

== Sources ==
- Grazulis, Thomas P. (November 1990). Significant Tornadoes 1880–1989. Vol. 2. St. Johnsbury, Vermont: The Tornado Project of Environmental Films. ISBN 1-879362-02-3.
- Grazulis, Thomas P. (July 1993). Significant Tornadoes 1680–1991: A Chronology and Analysis of Events. St. Johnsbury, Vermont: The Tornado Project of Environmental Films. ISBN 1-879362-03-1.
- Grazulis, Thomas P. (2001a). The Tornado: Nature's Ultimate Windstorm. Norman: University of Oklahoma Press. ISBN 978-0-8061-3538-0.
- Grazulis, Thomas P. (2001b). F5-F6 Tornadoes. St. Johnsbury, Vermont: The Tornado Project of Environmental Films.
