= Tornado outbreak of June 1881 =

Weather event in the United States

Coordinates: 40.5564°N 94.9716°W

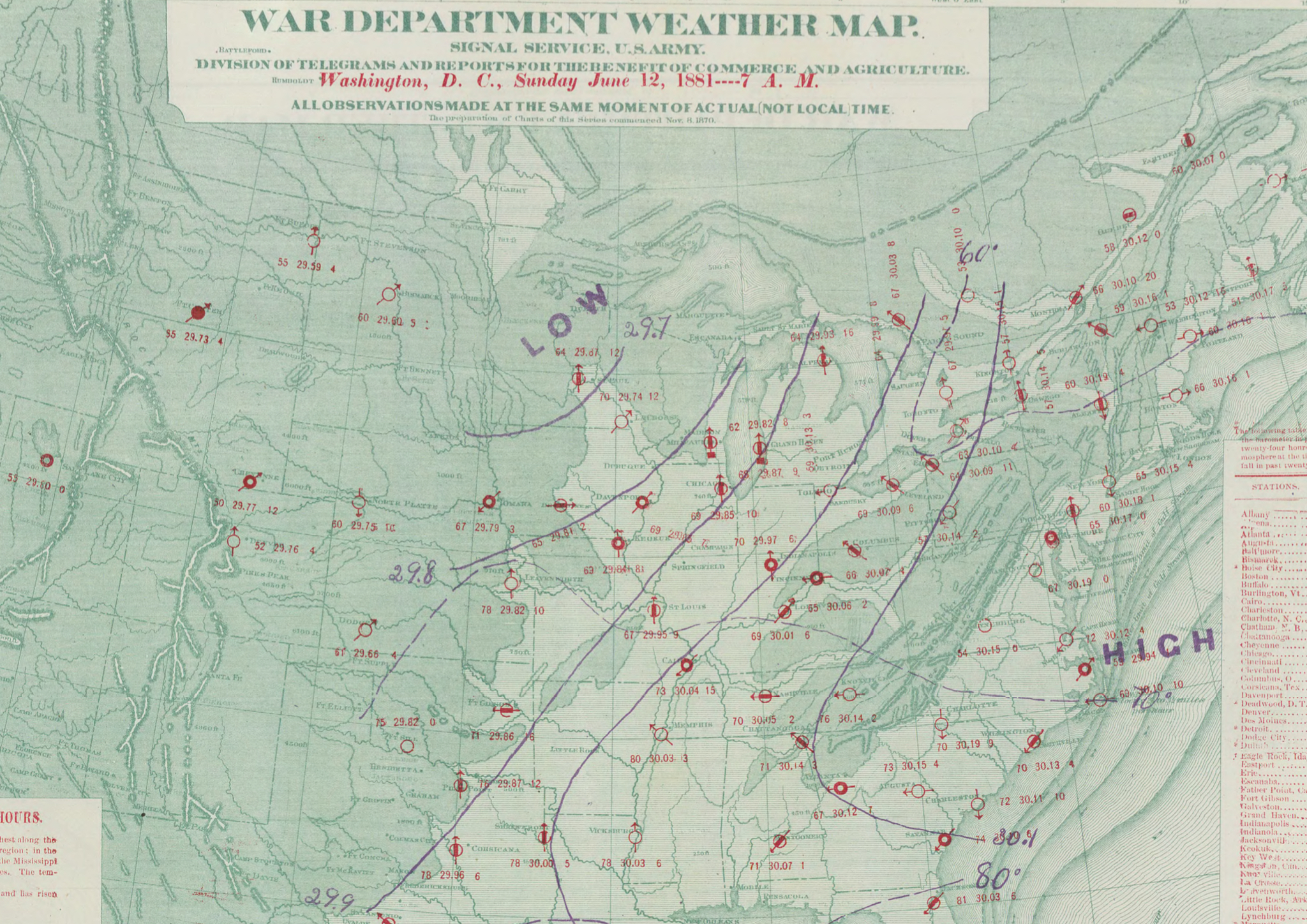
- Weather map of the low pressure system west of the Great Lakes that would spawn the tornado outbreak across the Midwestern U.S on June 12, 1881.

Tornado outbreak
- Tornadoes: 7
- Max. rating: F4 tornado
- Duration: June 12, 1881

Overall effects
- Fatalities: 15
- Injuries: 112
- Damage: Unknown (Note: All losses are in 1881 United States dollars unless otherwise noted.)
- Areas affected: Central United States
- Part of the tornadoes and tornado outbreaks of 1881

On June 12, 1881, a tornado outbreak affected the West North Central states of the Midwestern United States and produced numerous strong tornadoes, killing 15 people, primarily in parts of Kansas and Missouri. One of the strongest tornadoes in the outbreak was retroactively rated an F4—possibly an F5—on the Fujita scale, hitting near Hopkins, Missouri, in Nodaway County. Another F4 in Missouri claimed five lives, and a pair of F4s in Kansas collectively killed eight more. A fifth violent tornado also occurred in Iowa. In all, the outbreak injured at least 112. (Note: An outbreak is generally defined as a group of at least six tornadoes (the number sometimes varies slightly according to local climatology) with no more than a six-hour gap between individual tornadoes. An outbreak sequence, prior to (after) the start of modern records in 1950, is defined as a period of no more than two (one) consecutive days without at least one significant (F2 or stronger) tornado.)

== Confirmed tornadoes ==
Confirmed tornadoes by Fujita rating
FU	F0	F1	F2	F3	F4	F5	Total
0	?	?	1	1	5	0	7

Prior to 1990, there is a likely undercount of tornadoes, particularly E/F0–1, with reports of weaker tornadoes becoming more common as population increased. A sharp increase in the annual average E/F0–1 count by approximately 200 tornadoes was noted upon the implementation of NEXRAD Doppler weather radar in 1990–1991. (Note: Historically, the number of tornadoes globally and in the United States was and is likely underrepresented: research by Grazulis on annual tornado activity suggests that, as of 2001, only 53% of yearly U.S. tornadoes were officially recorded. Documentation of tornadoes outside the United States was historically less exhaustive, owing to the lack of monitors in many nations and, in some cases, to internal political controls on public information. Most countries only recorded tornadoes that produced severe damage or loss of life. Significant low biases in U.S. tornado counts likely occurred through the early 1990s, when advanced NEXRAD was first installed and the National Weather Service began comprehensively verifying tornado occurrences.) 1974 marked the first year where significant tornado (E/F2+) counts became homogenous with contemporary values, attributed to the consistent implementation of Fujita scale assessments. (Note: The Fujita scale was devised under the aegis of scientist T. Theodore Fujita in the early 1970s. Prior to the advent of the scale in 1971, tornadoes in the United States were officially unrated. Tornado ratings were retroactively applied to events prior to the formal adoption of the F-scale by the National Weather Service. While the Fujita scale has been superseded by the Enhanced Fujita scale in the U.S. since February 1, 2007, Canada used the old scale until April 1, 2013; nations elsewhere, like the United Kingdom, apply other classifications such as the TORRO scale.) Numerous discrepancies on the details of tornadoes in this outbreak exist between sources. The total count of tornadoes and ratings differs from various agencies accordingly. The list below documents information from the most contemporary official sources alongside assessments from tornado historian Thomas P. Grazulis.

=== June 12 event ===
List of confirmed tornadoes – Sunday, June 12, 1881
F#	Location	County / Parish	State	Time (UTC) (Note: All dates are based on the local time zone where the tornado touched down; however, all times are in Coordinated Universal Time and dates are split at midnight CST/CDT for consistency.)	Path length	Width (Note: The listed width values are primarily the average/mean width of the tornadoes, with those having known maximum widths denoted by ♯. From 1952 to 1994, reports largely list mean width whereas contemporary years list maximum width. Values provided by Grazulis are the average width, with estimates being rounded down (i.e. 0.5 mi (0.80 km) is rounded down from 880 yards to 800 yards.)	Damage
F3	NW of Mulvane to NE of Douglass	Sedgwick, Butler	KS	22:00–?	17 mi (27 km)	70 yd (64 m)	Unknown
F3	A tornado razed three homes, one of which it obliterated, injuring a few people. The snakelike funnel resembled "water being sprayed from a huge hose", according to an eyewitness quoted by Grazulis.						
F2	W of Belle Plaine to S of Mulvane	Sumner, Cowley	KS	22:00–?	13 mi (21 km)	50 yd (46 m)	Unknown
F2	A tornado leveled five barns and a farmhouse, injuring three people.						
F4	S of Seely to Floral to NE of Wilmot	Cowley	KS	22:30–?	17 mi (27 km)	400 yd (370 m)	Unknown
F4	3 deaths – A disastrous tornado destroyed the community of Floral, killing a few people there and leveling homes. However, residents sought shelter as the storm neared, reducing the death toll. One other person died on a farm outside Floral, and 28 other homes were razed along the path. In all 22 injuries occurred.						
F4+	W of Burlington Junction to W of Hopkins	Nodaway	MO	22:30–?	15 mi (24 km)	800 yd (730 m)	Unknown
F4+	2 deaths – A large, very intense multiple-vortex tornado obliterated a pair of farms near Hopkins, possibly at F5 intensity, and injured 15 people. It may have caused F4 or greater damage to other farms as well. In 2001 Grazulis deemed it to be "probably F5".						
F4	NW of Olivet to N of Richter	Osage, Franklin	KS	22:45–?	25 mi (40 km)	200 yd (180 m)	Unknown
F4	5 deaths – A tornado narrowly missed 100 farms along the Marais des Cygnes River, but still leveled 50 barns and homes in its path. Passing north of the Melvern–Quenemo area, it obliterated farmhouses and cast their debris miles away. 40 injuries occurred.						
F4	S of Fillmore to near King City	Andrew, Gentry	MO	22:50–?	35 mi (56 km)	300 yd (270 m)	Unknown
F4	5 deaths – A powerful tornado peaked near Flag Springs, flattening 80 buildings, including many barns and homes; killing much livestock; and injuring 20 people.						
F4	N of Adair to N of Casey	Guthrie	IA	01:00–?	10 mi (16 km)	200 yd (180 m)	Unknown
F4	An intense tornado annihilated three farmsteads, sweeping away a farmhouse and strewing its debris 1/2 mi (0.80 km). Injuring 10 people, it ended near the Raccoon River. In 1993 Grazulis rated it a high-end F3 but noted that it was "probably" F4, having ranked it as such in a 1984 study. An F5 tornado hit near Adair on June 27, 1953.						

== See also ==
- List of North American tornadoes and tornado outbreaks

== Sources ==
- Agee, Ernest M.; Childs, Samuel (June 1, 2014). "Adjustments in Tornado Counts, F-Scale Intensity, and Path Width for Assessing Significant Tornado Destruction". Journal of Applied Meteorology and Climatology. 53 (6). American Meteorological Society: 1494–1505. doi:10.1175/JAMC-D-13-0235.1.
- Brooks, Harold E. (April 2004). "On the Relationship of Tornado Path Length and Width to Intensity". Weather and Forecasting. 19 (2): 310–19. Bibcode:2004WtFor..19..310B. doi:10.1175/1520-0434(2004)019<0310:OTROTP>2.0.CO;2.
- Cook, A. R.; Schaefer, J. T. (August 2008). "The Relation of El Niño–Southern Oscillation (ENSO) to Winter Tornado Outbreaks". Monthly Weather Review. 136 (8): 3121–3137. Bibcode:2008MWRv..136.3121C. doi:10.1175/2007MWR2171.1.
- Edwards, Roger; LaDue, James G.; Ferree, John T.; Scharfenberg, Kevin; Maier, Chris; Coulbourne, William L. (May 1, 2013). "Tornado Intensity Estimation: Past, Present, and Future". Bulletin of the American Meteorological Society. 94 (5). American Meteorological Society: 641–653. doi:10.1175/BAMS-D-11-00006.1.
- Grazulis, Thomas P. (May 1984). Violent Tornado Climatography, 1880–1982. OSTI (Technical report). NUREG. Washington, D.C.: Nuclear Regulatory Commission. OSTI 7099491. CR-3670.
  - — (November 1990). Significant Tornadoes 1880–1989. Vol. 2. St. Johnsbury, Vermont: The Tornado Project of Environmental Films. ISBN 1-879362-02-3.
  - — (July 1993). Significant Tornadoes 1680–1991: A Chronology and Analysis of Events. St. Johnsbury, Vermont: The Tornado Project of Environmental Films. ISBN 1-879362-03-1.
  - — (2001a). The Tornado: Nature's Ultimate Windstorm. Norman: University of Oklahoma Press. ISBN 978-0-8061-3538-0.
  - — (2001b). F5-F6 Tornadoes. St. Johnsbury, Vermont: The Tornado Project of Environmental Films.
