= March 1875 Southeast tornado outbreak =

Weather event in the United States

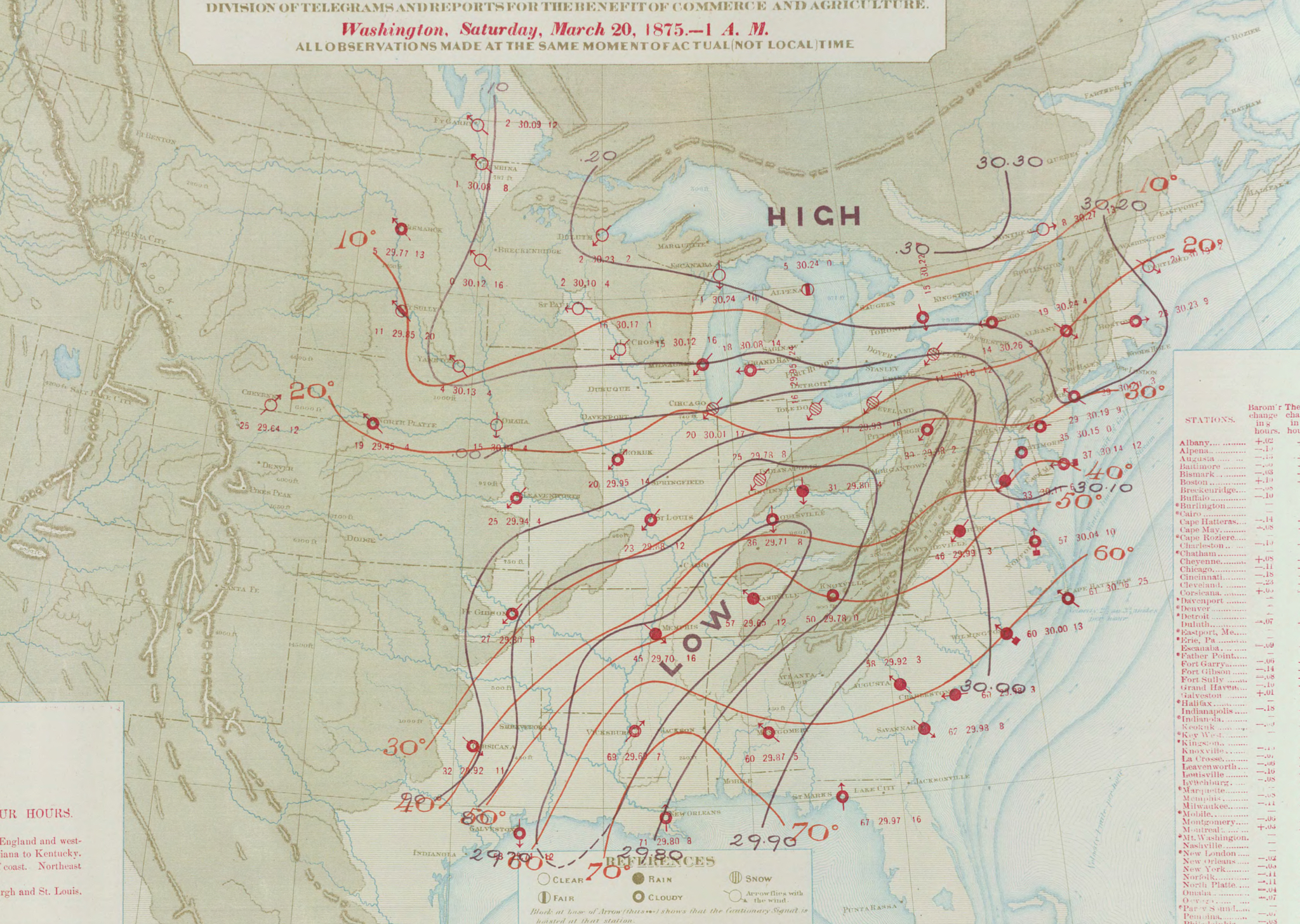
- Weather map of the storm complex over the Southern U.S on March 20, 1875, that would spawn the second round of tornadoes.

Meteorological history
- Formed: March 19, 1875
- Dissipated: March 20, 1875

Tornado outbreak
- Tornadoes: ≥ 19
- Max. rating: F4 tornado
- Duration: 1 day and 23 hours

Overall effects
- Fatalities: ≥ 96
- Injuries: ≥ 377
- Damage: ≥ $650,000 (1875 USD) ≥ $19.1 million (2025 USD)

The March 1875 Southeast tornado outbreak was a devastating event that struck the Southern United States from March 19–20, 1875. It produced least 19 tornadoes were recorded, with seven that were rated F4 by tornado expert Thomas P. Grazulis. Georgia bore the brunt of the destruction and fatalities, with two tornado families causing most of the damage. These families followed parallel paths, 12 to 15 mi (19 to 24 km) apart, through Georgia and South Carolina, consisting of multiple long-tracked and intense tornadoes.

The deadliest tornado of the outbreak, rated F4, killed 28–42 people in and around Sparta, Georgia, and Edgefield, South Carolina, on March 20. Another F4 tornado on a similar path may have caused up to 30 additional fatalities. Overall, the outbreak resulted in at least 96 deaths, 377 injuries, and $650,000 in damages - a staggering toll for the time. (Note: An outbreak is generally defined as a group of at least six tornadoes (the number sometimes varies slightly according to local climatology) with no more than a six-hour gap between individual tornadoes. An outbreak sequence, prior to (after) the start of modern records in 1950, is defined as a period of no more than two (one) consecutive days without at least one significant (F2 or stronger) tornado.) (Note: The Fujita scale was devised under the aegis of scientist T. Theodore Fujita in the early 1970s. Prior to the advent of the scale in 1971, tornadoes in the United States were officially unrated. While the Fujita scale has been superseded by the Enhanced Fujita scale in the U.S. since February 1, 2007, Canada used the old scale until April 1, 2013; nations elsewhere, like the United Kingdom, apply other classifications such as the TORRO scale.) (Note: Historically, the number of tornadoes globally and in the United States was and is likely underrepresented: research by Grazulis on annual tornado activity suggests that, as of 2001, only 53% of yearly U.S. tornadoes were officially recorded. Documentation of tornadoes outside the United States was historically less exhaustive, owing to the lack of monitors in many nations and, in some cases, to internal political controls on public information. Most countries only recorded tornadoes that produced severe damage or loss of life. Significant low biases in U.S. tornado counts likely occurred through the early 1990s, when advanced NEXRAD was first installed and the National Weather Service began comprehensively verifying tornado occurrences.)

== Confirmed tornadoes ==
The ratings for these tornadoes were done by tornado expert Thomas P. Grazulis and are not official ratings.

Confirmed tornadoes by Fujita rating
FU	F0	F1	F2	F3	F4	F5	Total
4	0	0	3	5	7	0	≥ 19

- Note: Some of the events listed as individual tornadoes were probably tornado families.

=== March 19 event ===
Confirmed tornadoes – Friday, March 19, 1875 (Note: All dates are based on the local time zone where the tornado touched down; however, all times are in Coordinated Universal Time and dates are split at midnight CST/CDT for consistency.) (Note: Prior to 1994, only the average widths of tornado paths were officially listed.)
F#	Location	County / Parish	State	Time (UTC)	Path length	Max. width	Summary
F3	Lone Grove–Ray's Point	Winn	LA	02:00–?	15 mi (24 km)	300 yd (270 m)	3 deaths- Three fatalities were reported after a tornado splintered thousands of trees and destroyed six homes in a sparsely populated area. All the deaths occurred within a single family. Additionally, ten individuals sustained injuries.

=== March 20 event ===
Confirmed tornadoes – Saturday, March 20, 1875
F#	Location	County / Parish	State	Time (UTC)	Path length	Max. width	Summary
F4	SW of Hamilton to E of Shiloh	Harris, Talbot	GA	15:20–?	25 mi (40 km)	800 yd (730 m)	11+ deaths – This was the first member in the northernmost of two major tornado families. Touching down in southwest Harris County, the "massive" tornado devastated rural plantations and forests in its path. It completely leveled several plantations and farms, with at least five deaths on one of them. Up to 15 deaths may have occurred in Harris County alone, but were unconfirmed. Winds from the parent supercell transferred a hat aloft for 30 mi (48 km) and a book for 40 mi (64 km). 40 people were injured.
F3	E of Thomastown to S of Forsyth	Upson, Lamar, Monroe	GA	16:00–?	30 mi (48 km)	200 yd (180 m)	This tornado formed 20 mi (32 km) from the dissipation of the previous event, but was in the same tornado family. People first sighted a funnel cloud developing over Thomastown, but it did not touch down until east of town. Once on the ground, the tornado "changed shape continuously." 15 people were injured.
FU	S of Statesville to S of Mocksville	Iredell, Davie	NC	16:00–?	15 mi (24 km)	Unknown	This may have been a tornado, a downburst or a combination of the two.
F4	N of Columbus to N of Talbotton	Muscogee, Harris, Talbot	GA	16:30–?	35 mi (56 km)	600 yd (550 m)	9 deaths – This was the first tornado in the southernmost of the two tornado families. Described as a "large and intense" tornado, it destroyed the village of "Mt. Airy" in the southeast corner of Harris County, killing six people in one home. Winds propelled a board from the home 18 in (46 cm) into the stump of a broken pine tree. The tornado destroyed more homes and an academy in or near Baughville in Talbot County, killing three people. 50 people were injured.
F3	N of Gray	Jones, Putnam	GA	16:50–?	10 mi (16 km)	200 yd (180 m)	1 death – This tornado struck only three farms, but demolished all of them. 10 people were injured.
F4	NW of Sparta, GA to S of Edgefield, SC	Hancock (GA), Warren (GA), McDuffie (GA), Columbia (GA), Edgefield (SC)	GA, SC	17:40–?	75 mi (121 km)	1,000 yd (910 m)	28+ deaths – See section on this tornado
F4	S of Gray to E of Milledgeville	Jones, Baldwin	GA	17:50–?	Unknown	600 yd (550 m)	13+ deaths – This tornado produced a "devastating" swath of damage near Milledgeville, with four deaths in Jones County and nine or more in Baldwin County. Residents of Milledgeville mistook the tornado for a column of smoke from a fire. When surveyors of the U.S. Army Signal Corps arrived three weeks later, a child was still unaccounted for and "presumed dead." 30 people were injured.
F4	ESE of Sparta to S of Gibson	Hancock, Washington, Glascock, Jefferson	GA	18:30–?	30 mi (48 km)	400 yd (370 m)	8+ deaths – This tornado caused eight deaths in Glascock County, but according to newspapers, the actual toll may have been 30. Some deaths in Hancock County attributed to the Sparta–Edgefield tornado may actually have been from this tornado. 40 people were injured.
F4	W of Keysville, GA to Williston, SC	Jefferson (GA), Burke (GA), Richmond (GA), Aiken (SC), Barnwell (SC)	GA, SC	19:00–?	50 mi (80 km)	400 yd (370 m)	6+ deaths – This tornado was likely a series of tornadoes and downbursts. It narrowly missed Augusta, passing 10 mi (16 km) southeast of that city before crossing the Savannah River into South Carolina. The tornado critically damaged or razed about 40 homes in Richmond County alone. The tornado left so much debris on farms that they were abandoned. As many as eight people may have died. 30 people were injured.
F4	Opelika, AL to Whitesville, GA	Lee (AL), Chambers (AL), Harris (GA)	AL, GA	19:30–?	20 mi (32 km)	300 yd (270 m)	7 deaths – This may have been a multiple-vortex tornado that killed seven people in a single family. 20 people were injured. This was the last violent tornado to impact Lee County until March 3, 2019.
F3	SW of Columbia	Lexington	SC	19:55–?	5 mi (8.0 km)	300 yd (270 m)	2 deaths – This tornado wrecked five or more farms in its path. A dozen people were injured.
F3	N of Sumter, SC to Tabor City, NC	Sumter (SC), Lee (SC), Florence (SC), Marion (SC), Horry (SC), Columbus (NC)	SC, NC	20:30–?	80 mi (130 km)	400 yd (370 m)	5 deaths – This tornado family produced a damage swath that varied from 20 yd (18 m) to almost 1 mi (1.6 km) wide, with several entire plantations wrecked. The tornado downed or split "tens of thousands" of trees and destroyed buildings on more than 40 farms. 30 people were injured.
FU	W of Raleigh	Chatham, Wake	NC	22:00–?	Unknown	Unknown	Another tornado or downburst dissipated about 10 mi (16 km) west of Raleigh.
F2	S of Norway to S of Orangeburg	Orangeburg	SC	22:00–?	25 mi (40 km)	200 yd (180 m)	3 deaths – This smoky-looking tornado leveled numerous little cabins. 20 people were injured.
FU	Indiantown	Williamsburg	SC	23:30–?	Unknown	Unknown	Details were unknown.
F2	Dogwood Neck	Horry	SC	00:00–?	Unknown	Unknown	This tornado swept a frame home clean to its foundation.
FU	NW of Conway	Horry	SC	00:00–?	15 mi (24 km)	Unknown	This tornado was not surveyed.
F2	SW of Sylvania	Bulloch	GA	01:00–?	Unknown	200 yd (180 m)	A tornado hit eight cabins, leveling them.

=== Sparta, Georgia/Edgefield, South Carolina ===
Sparta, Georgia/Edgefield, South Carolina
F4 tornado
- on the Fujita scale

Overall effects
- Fatalities: 28+
- Injuries: 70

A massive F4 carved a 75 miles (121 km) path of destruction through parts of Georgia and South Carolina, with a width ranging from 300 yards (270 m) to over 1 mile (1.6 km). The tornado first struck northwest of Sparta, Georgia, in Hancock County, destroying numerous farms and claiming four lives, three of whom were on a single farm. Remarkably, a door hinge from the farmhouse was found embedded 3 inches (7.6 cm) deep in a tree over a 1/4 mi (0.40 km) away.

In Warren County, at least six people died, including one at a church west of Warrenton. The pastor credited the survival of most congregants to the pews, which shielded them from falling timbers. The tornado continued through Camak, where 39 of the town's 40 homes were either damaged or obliterated. McDuffie County reported at least seven fatalities, potentially as many as 9, primarily among residents of small cabins.

Columbia County may have experienced up to 20 deaths, although only eight deaths were confirmed. In Appling at least four people perished, with reports suggesting as many as eight may have died on a single plantation. After crossing the state line into Edgefield County, South Carolina, the tornado caused comparatively less destruction. though six farms and plantations were destroyed, and three fatalities were recorded. The tornado finally dissipated south of Edgefield.

The death toll from this tornado is officially listed at 28, but with uncertainties and unconfirmed reports of additional deaths, the number may be as high as 42.

== See also ==
- List of North American tornadoes and tornado outbreaks
- Tornado intensity and damage
- Tornado outbreak of March 3, 2019 – Produced a violent tornado that affected Talbotton, Georgia

== Sources ==
- Brooks, Harold E. (April 2004). "On the Relationship of Tornado Path Length and Width to Intensity". Weather and Forecasting. 19 (2): 310–19. Bibcode:2004WtFor..19..310B. doi:10.1175/1520-0434(2004)019<0310:OTROTP>2.0.CO;2.
- Cook, A. R.; Schaefer, J. T. (August 2008). "The Relation of El Niño–Southern Oscillation (ENSO) to Winter Tornado Outbreaks". Monthly Weather Review. 136 (8): 3135. Bibcode:2008MWRv..136.3121C. doi:10.1175/2007MWR2171.1.
- Grazulis, Thomas P. (May 1984). Violent Tornado Climatography, 1880–1982. OSTI (Technical report). NUREG. Washington, D.C.: Nuclear Regulatory Commission. OSTI 7099491. CR-3670.
  - — (November 1990). Significant Tornadoes 1880–1989. Vol. 2. St. Johnsbury, Vermont: The Tornado Project of Environmental Films. ISBN 1-879362-02-3.
  - — (July 1993). Significant Tornadoes 1680–1991: A Chronology and Analysis of Events. St. Johnsbury, Vermont: The Tornado Project of Environmental Films. ISBN 1-879362-03-1.
  - — (2001a). The Tornado: Nature's Ultimate Windstorm. Norman: University of Oklahoma Press. ISBN 978-0-8061-3538-0.
  - — (2001b). F5-F6 Tornadoes. St. Johnsbury, Vermont: The Tornado Project of Environmental Films.
