= Jack Beauchamp =

American politician (1932–2007)

Member of the Kansas House of Representatives from the 14th district
- In office 1987–1988
- Preceded by: Dorothy Nichols
- Succeeded by: Bettie Shumway

Personal details
- Born: Jack Eugene Beauchamp; February 10, 1932 Kansas City, Kansas, U.S.
- Died: September 21, 2007 (aged 75) Ottawa, Kansas, U.S.
- Party: Republican
- Spouse: Lyndell Jane Staadt (m. 1953)
- Children: 3
- Parent(s): Ted Beauchamp; Opal Fowler
- Education: Appanoose High School; Kansas State University; University of Kansas
- Profession: Politician, farmer

Military service
- Allegiance: United States
- Branch/service: United States Army
- Years of service: 1954–1955

Jack Eugene Beauchamp (February 10, 1932 – September 21, 2007) was an American politician and farmer who served a single term in the Kansas House of Representatives, representing the 14th legislative district of Kansas from 1987 to 1988 as a Republican.

== Early life and education ==
Beauchamp was born in Kansas City, Kansas, on February 10, 1932, to Ted Beauchamp and Opal Fowler. At a young age, he moved to Lane, then Appanoose Township.

Beauchamp graduated from Appanoose High School in 1950. He subsequently attended Kansas State University and the University of Kansas.

== Career ==
Beauchamp served in the United States Army from 1954 to 1955.

Beauchamp served a single term in the Kansas House of Representatives, representing the 14th legislative district of Kansas from 1987 to 1988 as a Republican.

Outside of the Kansas Legislature, Beauchamp was a farmer and stockman who farmed buffalo.

Beauchamp served as a member of various organizations, including the Ottawa school board, the Franklin County Farm Bureau, the Ottawa Recreation Commission, the Franklin County Planning Commission, and the Franklin County Historical Society. He served as president of the Kansas State Board of Agriculture and the Kansas State Fair Board. Additionally, Beauchamp coached baseball for a number of years.

== Personal life and death ==
Beauchamp married Lyndell Jane Staadt in Richter, Kansas, on August 23, 1953. They were married for over 54 years and had three children together.

Beauchamp was a member of the Richter United Methodist Church.

Beauchamp died at the age of 75 at his home in Ottawa, Kansas, on September 21, 2007.

Kansas House of Representatives
Preceded by Dorothy Nichols	Member of the Kansas House of Representatives from the 14th district 1987–1988	Succeeded by Bettie Shumway
