= Dorothy Nichols =

American politician

Member of the Kansas House of Representatives from the 14th district
- In office 1981–1986
- Preceded by: Jim L. Allen
- Succeeded by: Jack Beauchamp

Personal details
- Born: November 13, 1923
- Died: April 19, 2004 Harlingen, Texas
- Party: Republican
- Spouse: William Nichols
- Children: 6

Dorothy Naddelle Nichols (November 13, 1923–April 19, 2004) was an American politician who served for three terms as a Republican member of the Kansas House of Representatives, from 1981 to 1986.

Nichols lived in Ottawa, Kansas, where she was a city councillor and mayor before being elected to the state legislature. She was married to William Nichols, who died before she entered the Kansas House, and was the mother of six children. She owned and operated a cafe in Ottawa.
