= Nancy Brown (Kansas politician) =

American politician

Member of the Kansas House of Representatives from the 27th district
- In office 1985–1994
- Preceded by: David Webb
- Succeeded by: Phyllis Gilmore

Personal details
- Born: September 3, 1942 Chicago, Illinois
- Died: March 9, 2020 Kansas City, Missouri
- Party: Republican
- Spouse: Myron Brown
- Children: 2
- Education: Barat College (B.A.); University of Missouri-Kansas City (M.A.)

Nancy J. Brown (September 3, 1942 – March 9, 2020) was an American politician who served as a Republican member of the Kansas House of Representatives from 1985 to 1994.

Brown grew up in the northern suburbs of Chicago, attending high school in Zion, Illinois and Barat College in Lake Forest. She lived in Riverwoods, Illinois until 1980 and was active in local politics there, working on water and sewer issues as a member of the village council and planning a run for mayor, but when her husband's company was transferred, she moved with him to Stanley, Kansas. She became a township trustee and failed in her attempt to lower sewer fees. Brown first ran for the state legislature in 1984.

Brown was re-elected to the state legislature for an additional four terms, serving from 1985 to 1994. During her time in the legislature, she was active on issues involving local government and emergency response. In addition to her service in the legislature, Brown was a founding member of the United Methodist Church of the Resurrection in Leawood, Kansas. After leaving the House, she worked as the executive director of the Women's Legislative Network, a project of the National Conference of State Legislators. Brown died in 2020 after a three-year struggle with cancer.
