= Bettie Shumway =

American politician

Member of the Kansas House of Representatives from the 14th district
- In office 1989–1990
- Preceded by: Jack Beauchamp
- Succeeded by: Mark Parkinson

Personal details
- Born: Bettie White; March 14, 1924 Tyronza, Arkansas
- Died: January 19, 2007 Lawrence, Kansas
- Party: Democratic
- Spouse: Keith Shumway
- Education: Louisiana Tech University

Bettie Sue Shumway (March 14, 1924–January 19, 2007) was an American politician who served for one term as a Democratic member of the Kansas House of Representatives, from 1989 to 1990.

Shumway was born in Tyronza, Arkansas and grew up in Louisiana, graduating from Louisiana Tech University. She worked as a music teacher and kindergarten teacher in public schools. She moved to Kansas with her husband in 1961 and continued teaching; she was elected to the state House in 1988, and was the office-mate of future governor Kathleen Sebelius during her time in the Capitol.
