= Jim L. Allen =

American politician

Jim Allen

Member of the Kansas Senate from the 11th district
- In office 1981 – July 1991
- Preceded by: Winton A. Winter Sr.
- Succeeded by: David Webb

Member of the Kansas House of Representatives from the 14th district
- In office 1979–1980
- Succeeded by: Dorothy Nichols

Personal details
- Born: March 22, 1934 Ottawa, Kansas
- Died: January 20, 2003 Topeka, Kansas
- Party: Republican
- Spouse: Carol Schaben (m. December 26, 1954)
- Education: Kansas State University

Jim L. Allen (March 22, 1934 – January 20, 2003) was an American politician who served in the Kansas House of Representatives and Kansas State Senate.

Allen was elected to the Kansas House in 1978, taking office in January 1979 and serving only a single term. He successfully ran for the state senate in 1980 and was re-elected in 1984 and 1988, resigning his seat in July 1991.

Allen worked as a dairy farmer.
