= Phyllis Gilmore =

American politician

Member of the Kansas House of Representatives from the 27th district
- In office 1995–1999
- Preceded by: Nancy Brown
- Succeeded by: Raymond Merrick

Personal details
- Born: February 4, 1945 St. Louis, Missouri
- Died: January 24, 2021 Olathe, Kansas
- Party: Republican
- Spouse: Kenneth Gilmore
- Children: 2
- Education: Vanderbilt University

Phyllis Lee Gilmore (February 4, 1945–January 24, 2021) was an American politician. She served as a member of the Kansas House of Representatives from 1995 to 1999, and as head of the Kansas Department for Children and Families from 2012 to 2017.

Gilmore was born in St. Louis, Missouri and attended Vanderbilt University. She married and moved to Johnson County, Kansas in 1972, where she worked as a social worker. In 1994, she won election to the Kansas House, where she was re-elected in 1996 and 1998. During her time there, she worked on bills that would affect the adoption system.

In 2012, Governor Sam Brownback named her to be Secretary of the Department of Children and families. During her tenure as secretary, she faced criticism about the department's implementation of policy on assistance to the poor, and on their mishandling of the cases of children in foster care. She stepped down in December 2017, when Brownback left the governorship and incoming governor Jeff Colyer targeted Gilmore in a staff shakeup. After her tenure as secretary, she retired, dying in 2021 in Olathe, Kansas.
