= David Webb (politician) =

American politician

Member of the Kansas Senate from the 11th district
- In office July 1991 – January 1993
- Preceded by: Jim Allen
- Succeeded by: Robert Vancrum

Member of the Kansas House of Representatives from the 27th district
- In office 1979–1984
- Succeeded by: Nancy Brown

Personal details
- Born: November 18, 1954 (age 71)
- Party: Republican

David Lee Webb (born November 18, 1954) is an American former politician who served in the Kansas House of Representatives and Kansas State Senate.

Webb was elected to the Kansas House in 1978, taking office in January 1979. He served three terms in the House, leaving the chamber after the 1984 legislative session. In 1991, Webb made a brief return to politics when he was appointed to fill out the remaining term of Jim Allen, who had resigned from the 11th Senate district. Webb was in the Senate from July 1991 until the expiration of the term in January 1993.
