= Kansas Department for Children and Families =

State agency in Kansas, United States

Kansas Department of Children and Families
- Great Seal of Kansas

Department overview
- Formed: 1973
- Preceding Department: Kansas Department of Social and Rehabilitation Services
- Jurisdiction: State of Kansas
- Headquarters: 555 S. Kansas Avenue; Topeka, Kansas 66603
- Employees: 2,500
- Annual budget: $684 million
- Department executive: Laura Howard, Secretary of Children and Families
- Website: www.dcf.ks.gov

The Kansas Department for Children and Families (formerly the Kansas Department of Social and Rehabilitation Services) is a state agency in Kansas, responsible for the delivery of social services to those in need of them.

The agency was founded in 1973, and it is currently headed by Laura Howard.

== History ==
=== Pre-establishment ===
The 1859 Wyandotte Constitution mandated that the state create and support institutions for “the benefit of the insane, blind, deaf and dumb, and such other benevolent institutions as the public good may require.” As a result, the Kansas Insane Asylum was established in 1866 in Osawatomie. Due to overcrowding, an additional asylum was approved by Governor Osborn; the Topeka State Hospital opened in 1879. Another asylum was opened in 1881, the State Asylum for Idiotic and Imbecile Youth in Lawrence which was moved to Winfield in 1887. It was renamed the State Home for the Feeble-Minded in 1909 and then renamed again to the State Training School in 1920. In 1903 the legislation to create the State Hospital for Epileptics in Parsons passed with the hospital being renamed the Parsons State Training School in 1953. The Larned State Hospital opened in 1914 which took on additional responsibilities with the opening of the State Security Hospital in 1939. In 1960 the Kansas Neurological Institute opened in Topeka and tuberculosis hospitals where opened in Norton in 1914 and Chanute in 1963. And lastly, the Rainbow Mental Health Facility was established in Osawatomie in 1973.

Prior to Executive Reorganization Order No. 1, all of these hospitals, as well as all social service programs where overseen by counties with very little state oversight. The only exception being state social security which, due to the 1937 Kansas Welfare Act had a state board oversee how to most efficiently spread federal funding. By 1949 this board became the state board for social welfare, however counties retained primary administrative control over welfare.

=== Establishment ===
The agency was first established in 1973 from then-Governor Docking's Executive Reorganization Order No. 1, which created the Kansas Department of Social and Rehabilitation Services. Governor Docking then appointed Dr. Robert Harder as the first secretary of the agency. In that same year, legislation was passed to transfer all social welfare programs from the various counties to the new agency. The time it took to transfer the programs to the new umbrella agency was about nine months.

== Services ==
- Child support services
- Economic and employment services
- Foster care
- Prevention and protection services
- Rehabilitation services

== List of secretaries ==
No.	Name	Governor(s)	Term	Party	Notes	Ref
1.	Robert Harder	Robert Docking; Robert Bennett; John Carlin	1973-1987	Democrat	Received a doctorate in Theology, state representative, longest-serving cabinet secretary in Kansas history	
2.	Winston Barton	Mike Hayden	1987-1990		Previously worked for the Health Care Finance Administration	
3.	Dennis Taylor	Mike Hayden	1990-1991			
-	Robert Harder	Joan Finney	1991-1991	Democrat	Dr Harder briefly returned as interim Secretary	
4.	Donna Whiteman	Joan Finney	1991-1995			
5.	Rochelle Chronister	Bill Graves	1995-1999	Republican	Former Chairwoman of the Kansas Republican Party	
6.	Janet Schalansky	Bill Graves; Kathleen Sebelius	1999-2004			
7.	Gary Daniels	Kathleen Sebelius	2004-2006			
8.	Don Jordan	Kathleen Sebelius; Mark Parkinson	2006-2011			
9.	Rob Siedlecki	Sam Brownback	2011-2011		Former chief of staff in the Florida Department of Health	
10.	Phyllis Gilmore	Sam Brownback	2011-2017	Republican	Targeted in an administrative shakeup	
11.	Gina Meier-Hummel	Sam Brownback; Jeff Colyer	2017-2019		Executive Director of various charitable organizations	
12.	Laura Howard	Laura Kelly	2019-Present		Originally interim Secretary for four months.	
