= Robert Harder =

American politician

Kansas Secretary of Social and Rehabilitation Services
- In office 1973–1987
- Governor: Robert Docking; Robert Bennett; John Carlin
- Preceded by: Position Established
- Succeeded by: Winston Barton

Member of the Kansas House of Representatives from the 33rd district
- In office January 9, 1961 – January 11, 1965
- Preceded by: James W. Ingwersen
- Succeeded by: Bill Bunten

Member of the Kansas House of Representatives from the 31st district
- In office January 11, 1965 – January 9, 1967
- Preceded by: Charles McCall
- Succeeded by: Clarence Chester Love Sr.

Personal details
- Born: June 4, 1929 Horton, Kansas, U.S.
- Died: April 12, 2014 (aged 84) Topeka, Kansas, U.S.
- Party: Democratic
- Spouse: Dottie
- Children: 2
- Education: Baker University; Perkins School of Theology; Boston University

Robert Clarence Harder (June 4, 1929 – April 12, 2014) was an American politician and Methodist clergyman. He was the longest-serving cabinet secretary in Kansas history.

Born in Horton, Kansas, he received his bachelor's degree from Baker University, his master's degree in theology from Perkins School of Theology, and his doctorate degree from Boston University. Harder then served as pastor of a United Methodist Church. From 1961 to 1967, he served in the Kansas House of Representatives as a Democrat. He then served as Secretary of the Kansas Department of Social and Rehabilitation from 1967 to 1987, and later served as Secretary of the Department of Health and Environment. He died in Topeka, Kansas, of a brain tumor.
