= Floral, Kansas =

Unincorporated community in Cowley County, Kansas

Coordinates: 37°21′10″N 96°55′15″W

Floral is an unincorporated community in Cowley County, Kansas, United States.

== History ==
Floral had a post office from 1870 until 1932.

Floral was a shipping point on the St. Louis–San Francisco Railway.

== Education ==
The community is served by Winfield USD 465 public school district.
