= Flag Springs, Missouri =

Unincorporated community in Missouri, U.S.

Coordinates: 40°01′30″N 94°40′01″W

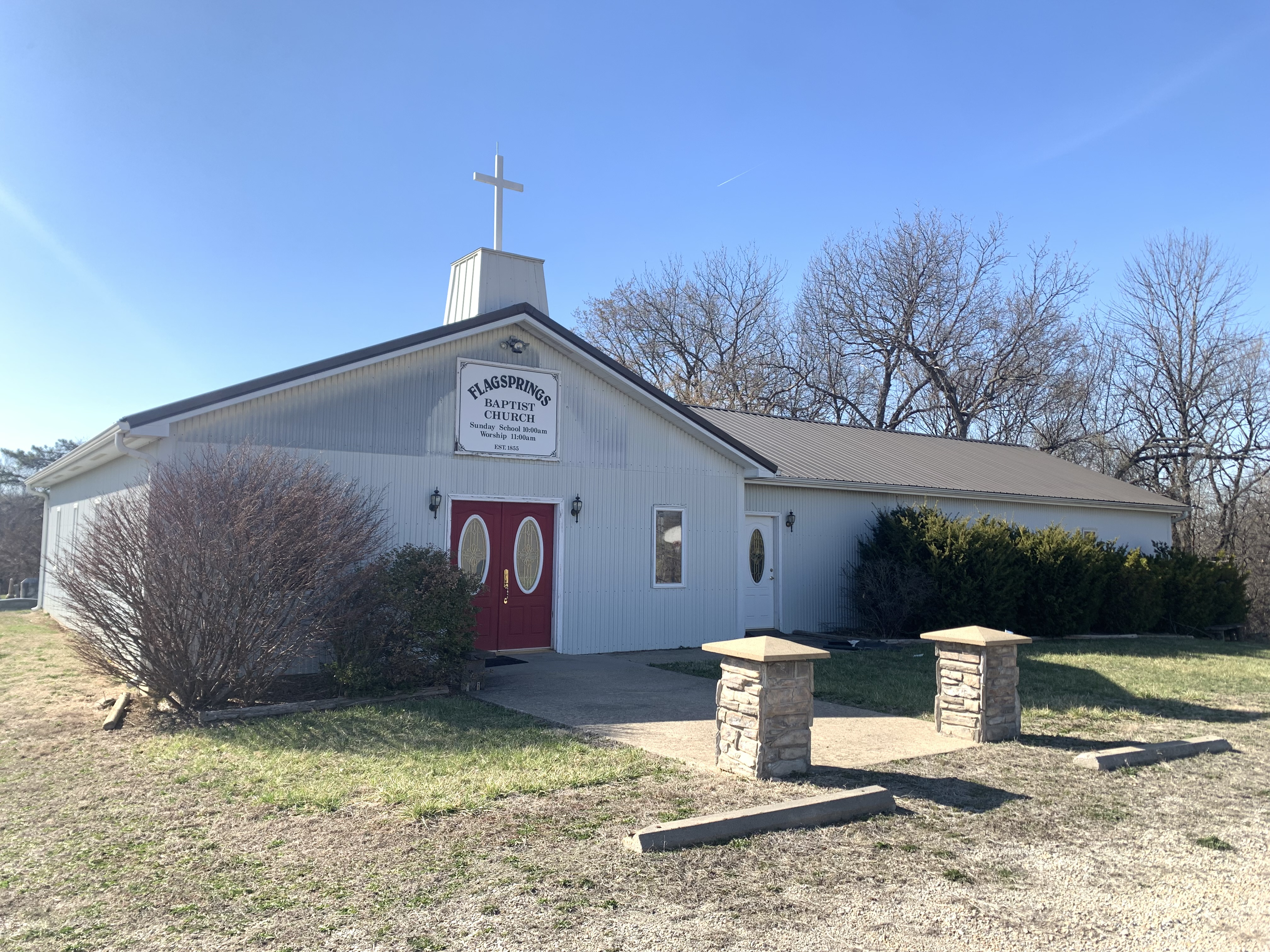
Flag Springs Baptist Church, March 2025

Flag Springs is an unincorporated community in Andrew County, Missouri, United States.

== History ==
Flag Springs was first owned and settled in 1841 and was called Flag Springs because of flag irises that grow near a natural spring that flowed from a limestone ledge. A post office called Flag Springs was established in 1870, and remained in operation until 1907.
