= Baughville, Georgia =

Unincorporated community in Georgia, U.S.

Coordinates: 32°39′10″N 84°40′14″W

Baughville is an unincorporated community in the Talbot County in Georgia.

== History ==
A post office called Baughville was established in 1888, and remained in operation until 1905. The community is located inland away from railroad lines.

On March 3, 2019, an EF4 tornado struck the town at low-end EF3 strength. Two churches and a mobile home were destroyed and a two-story frame home also sustained severe damage.
