= Richter, Kansas =

Unincorporated community in Franklin County, Kansas

- Unincorporated community
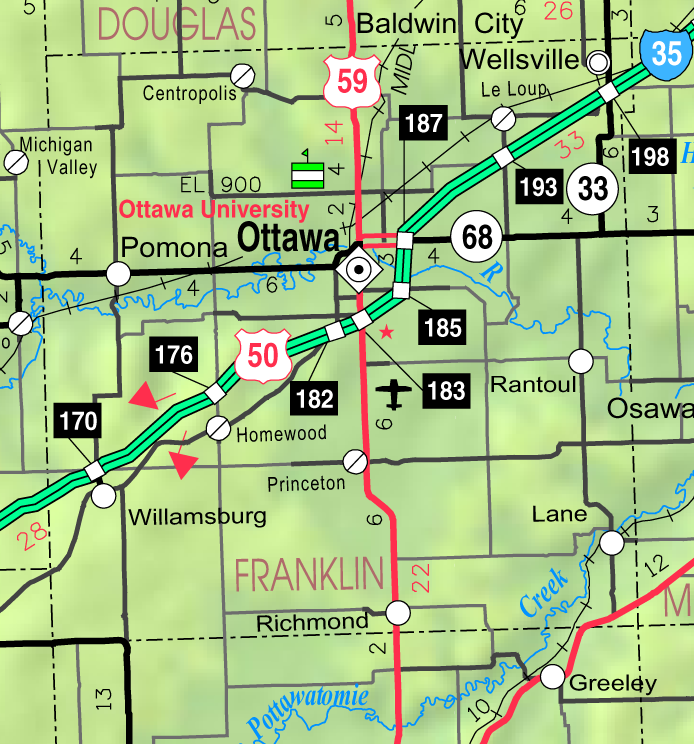
- KDOT map of Franklin County (legend)

- Location within Kansas Location within the United States
- Coordinates: 38°36′43″N 95°22′44″W
- Country: United States
- State: Kansas
- County: Franklin
- Elevation: 929 ft (283 m)
- Time zone: UTC-6 (CST)
  - Summer (DST): UTC-5 (CDT)
- Area code: 785
- FIPS code: 20-59750
- GNIS ID: 484898

Richter is an unincorporated community in Franklin County, Kansas, United States.

== History ==
A post office was opened in Richter in 1890, and remained in operation until it was discontinued in 1907.
