= Weather of 2001 =

Weather events in the year 2001

The following is a list of weather events that occurred on Earth in the year 2001. The year began with a La Niña. There were several natural disasters around the world from various types of weather, including tornadoes, floods and tropical cyclones. The deadliest disaster was Typhoon Lingling in November, which caused 379 fatalities. The costliest event of the year was Hurricane Michelle, which caused $2.43 billion in damages.

2001 was the second hottest year on record at the time behind 1998, which was amplified by the end of a 3 years-long La Niña. The Atlantic and Pacific tropical storm seasons were both unusually active.

== Winter storms and cold waves ==
In January, a winter storm hit parts of the northern United States, causing an injury but no fatalities.

== Droughts, heat waves, and wildfires ==
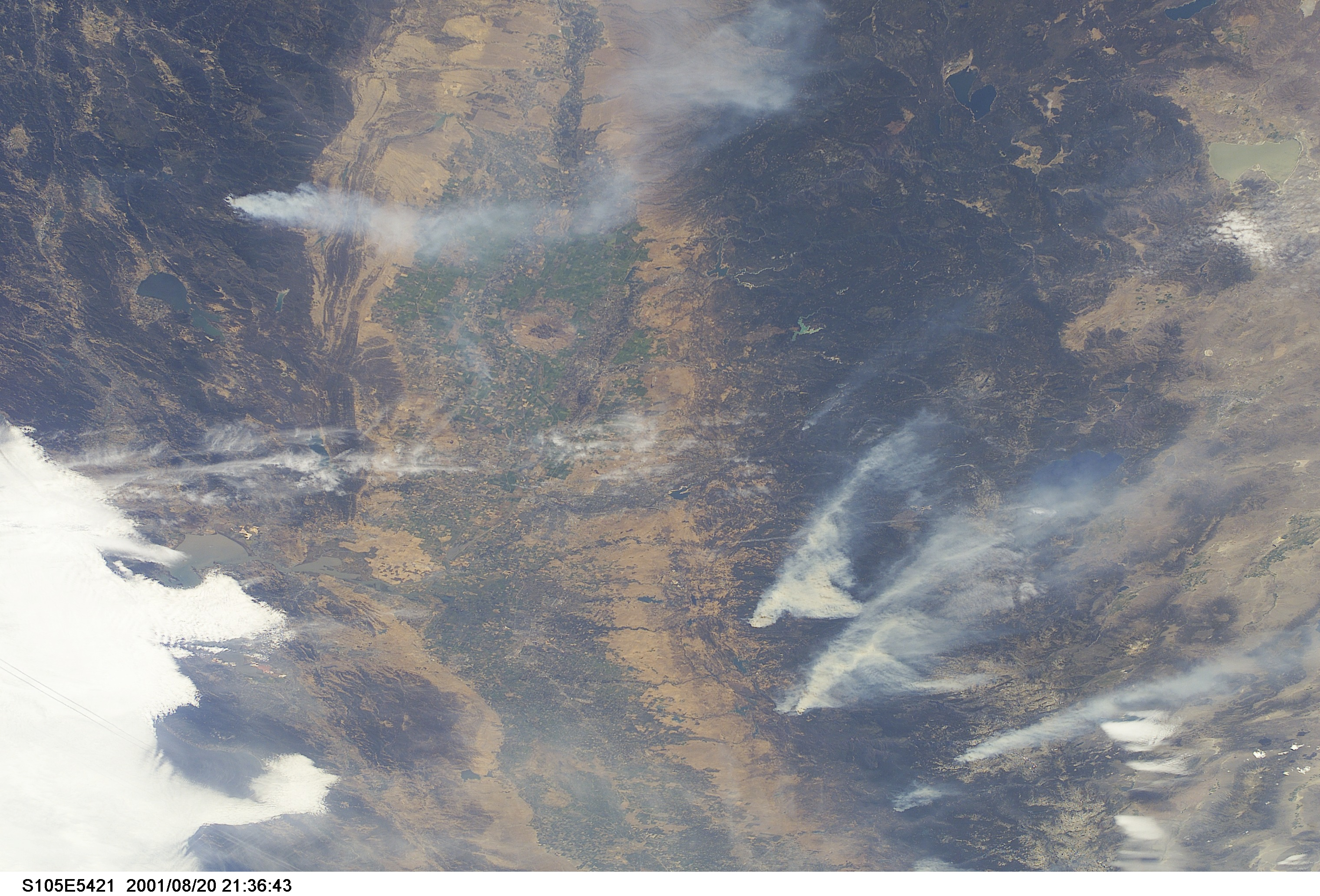
The 2001 California Wildfires, as seen from the International Space Station.

In May, a severe heat wave hit many parts of India, causing over 1,000 deaths across the country. 2001 had a relatively low amount of droughts and heat waves.

Large wildfires took place in California in 2001, killing over 2 people, destroying over 390 buildings, and causing US$196 million (2001 USD) in damages. The Observation Fire was the largest fire to take place during the season, burning over 67,000 acres of land.

The Poe Fire in September was the most destructive wildfire of 2001, injuring over 23 people and destroying more than 133 buildings in parts of north-central California. No fatalities were reported.

== Floods ==
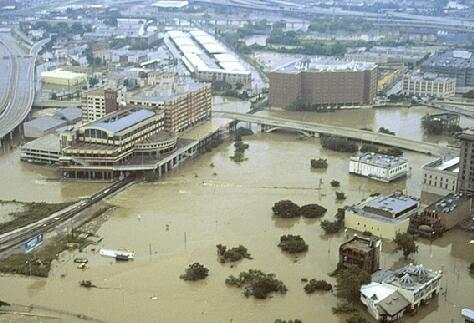
Flooding in Houston, Texas on June 9

In April, a historic flood occurred in portions of the Upper Mississippi River, rising to the highest water levels for the river since 1965. Many homes were washed away, and an unknown number of injuries were reported.

On May 21 a large flood in Lensk, Russia washed away 400+ homes and left over 2,000 people homeless.

On June 4, the 2001 Southeastern United States floods, were triggered by Tropical Storm Allison, killed over 30 people in the Houston, Texas area and left over 40,000 people homeless. Other smaller floods were also triggered as a result of Allison, but none were significant.

== Tornadoes ==
There were 1,215 tornadoes in the United States, resulting in 40 deaths. In February, a tornado outbreak caused $35 million in damage, and one tornado killed 6 people. In April a large tornado outbreak killed 4 people and injured 18. In September, the tornado outbreak of September 24, 2001 killed 2 people, injured 57 others, and caused $105.157 million (2001 USD) in damages. In November, the Tornado outbreak of November 23–24, 2001 impacted the southern United States, killing 13 and injuring 219.

== Tropical cyclones ==
Hurricane Karen on October 13

In 2001, tropical cyclones and hurricanes formed in various parts of the Atlantic, Pacific and Indian Oceans. A total of 128 tropical cyclones formed within tropical cyclone basins, and 83 of them were named by weather agencies when they attained maximum sustained winds of 35 knots (65 km/h; 40 mph). Typhoon Faxai is the strongest tropical cyclone throughout the year, peaking with a pressure of 915 hPa (27.02 inHg) and attaining 10-minute sustained winds of 195 km/h (120 mph).

The deadliest tropical cyclone of the year was Lingling in the West Pacific which caused 379 fatalities in total as it struck the Philippines and Vietnam, while the costliest storm of the year was Michelle, with a damage cost of around $2.43 billion as it catastrophically affected the Greater Antilles and the Bahamas in late October.

23 Category 3 tropical cyclones formed, and 2 Category 5 tropical cyclones formed. The accumulated cyclone energy (ACE) index for the 2001, as calculated by Colorado State University was 672.4 units.

Global weather by year
Preceded by 2000	Weather of 2001	Succeeded by 2002
