= 2001 Hoisington tornado =

2001 F4 tornado in Kansas

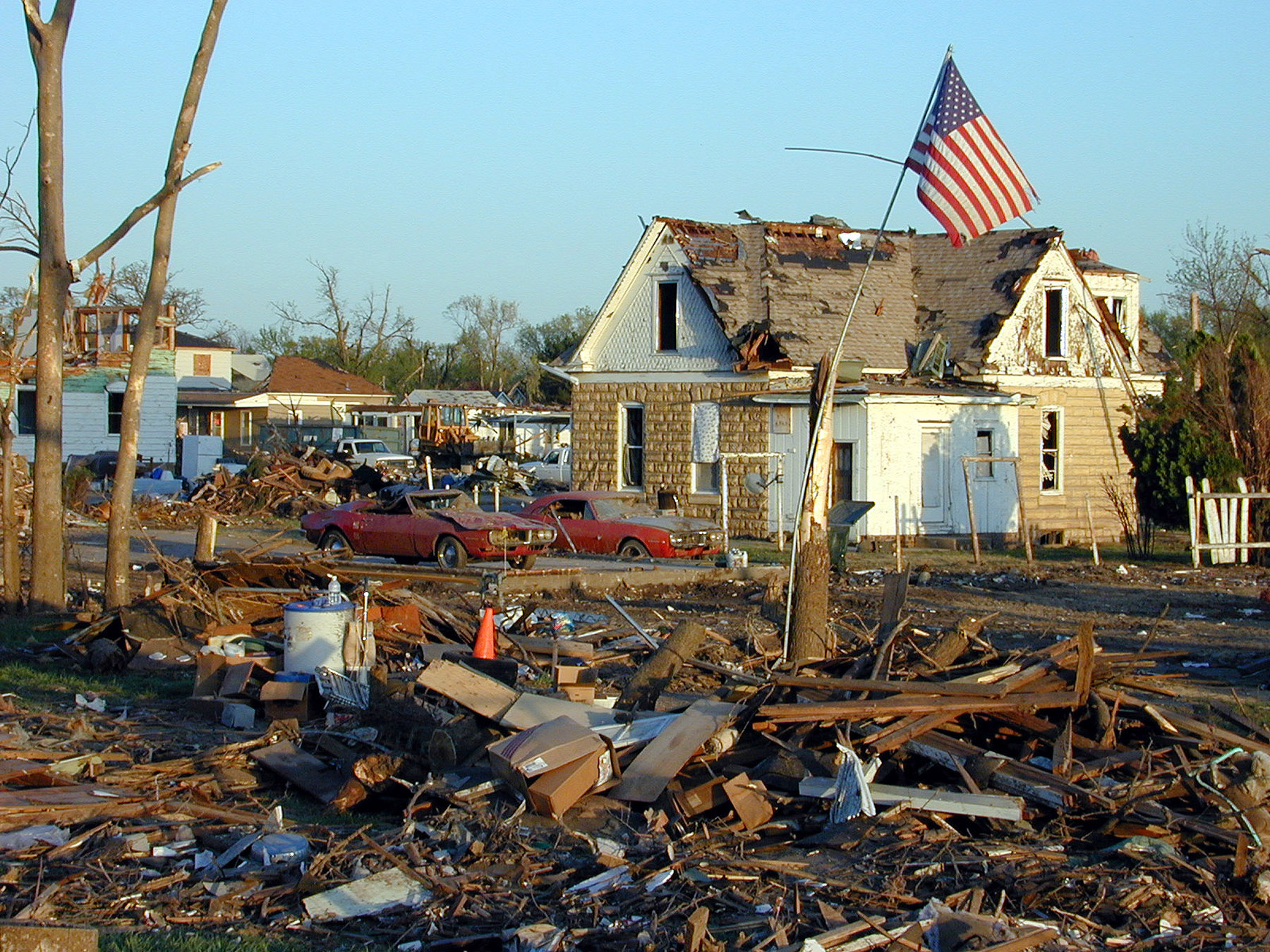
- Aftermath of the tornado

Meteorological history
- Date: April 21, 2001

F4 tornado
- on the Fujita scale
- Highest winds: 207 mph (333 km/h)–260 mph (420 km/h)

Overall effects
- Fatalities: 1
- Injuries: 28
- Damage: $40.1 million (1997 USD)
- Areas affected: Barton County, Kansas
- Part of the Tornadoes of 2001

On April 21, 2001, a violent and destructive tornado hit the city of Hoisington, Kansas. The tornado killed one and injured twenty-eight others, and left one-third of the city devastated, with over 400 structures damaged to varying degrees. Of these structures, 200 homes were destroyed, with 85 severely damaged and 200 with minor to moderate damage. In addition, 12 businesses were destroyed.

== Meteorological synopsis ==
At 7:49 p.m. on April 21, radio operator Carl Andersen, the Barton County Emergency Coordinator for emergency radio communication at the Emergency Operations Center (EOC) in Great Bend, Kansas, sent out a warning that storms were reported in the neighboring counties to the west. At that point, the warning was only for hail. However by 9:15 P.M., it had changed to a tornado warning because of funnel cloud sightings in the Hoisington area. At 9:30 p.m., another radio operator, Larry Bruce, reported back to the EOC that a storm had just passed through Hoisington, approximately 10 miles north of Great Bend.

== Tornado summary ==
Shortly past 9:00 PM CST, the tornado touched down in an area southwest of the city of Hoisington. The tornado moved northeast through West 2nd Street, directly striking several housing units. As it caused intense damage in the residential areas located in the south of the city, the tornado began to run roughly parallel to South Main Street, one of the main streets in the town. One person, a 69 year old man, was killed when his home was hit by the tornado.

As the tornado left the downtown area, it began to weaken, inflicting F2 damage as it exited city limits. It dissipated shortly after, tracking a total of 5 miles (8.0 km).

== Aftermath ==
200 homes were destroyed by the tornado, and a further 85 were heavily damaged. 12 businesses were also destroyed by the tornado. One person was killed, and 28 others were injured.

== See also ==
- List of F4 and EF4 tornadoes (2000–2009)
