= Tornadoes of 2001 =

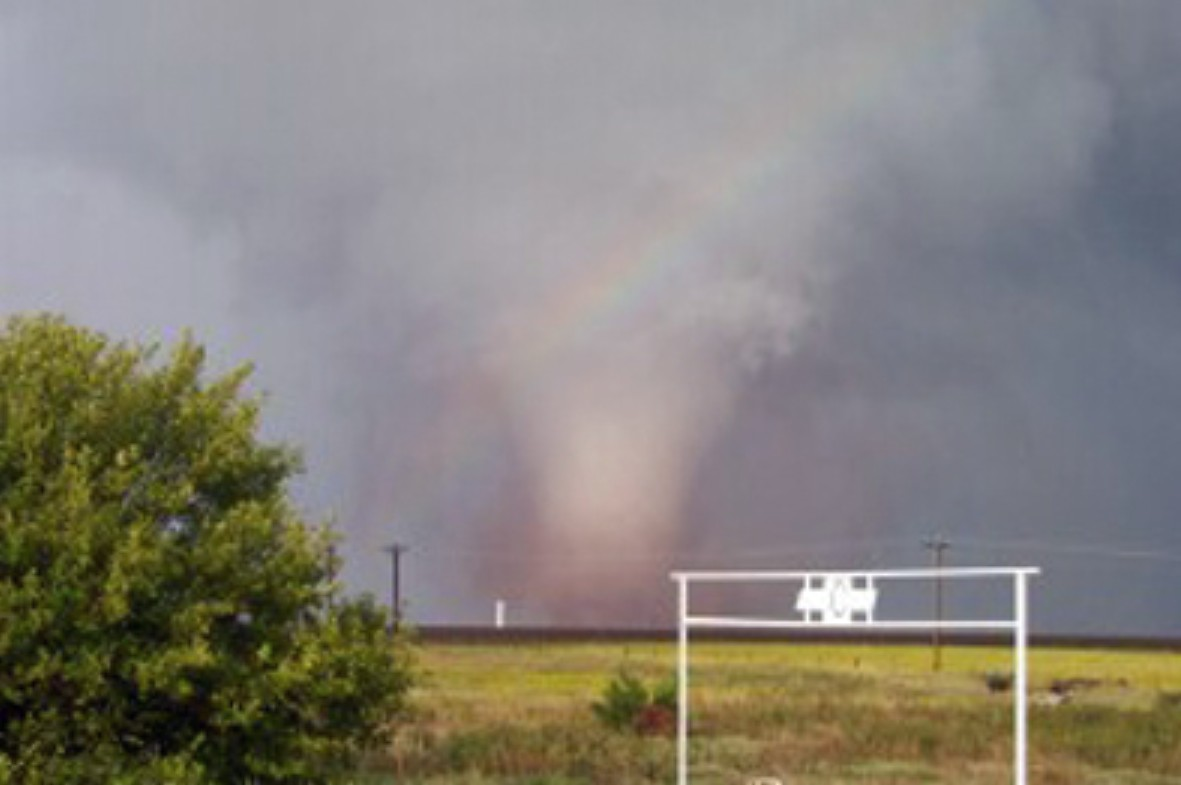
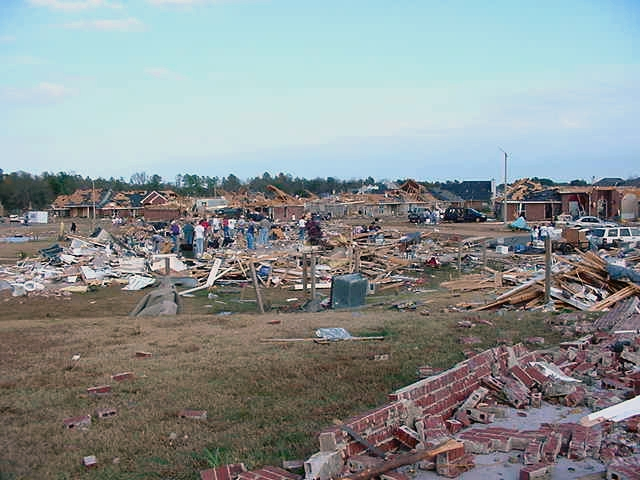
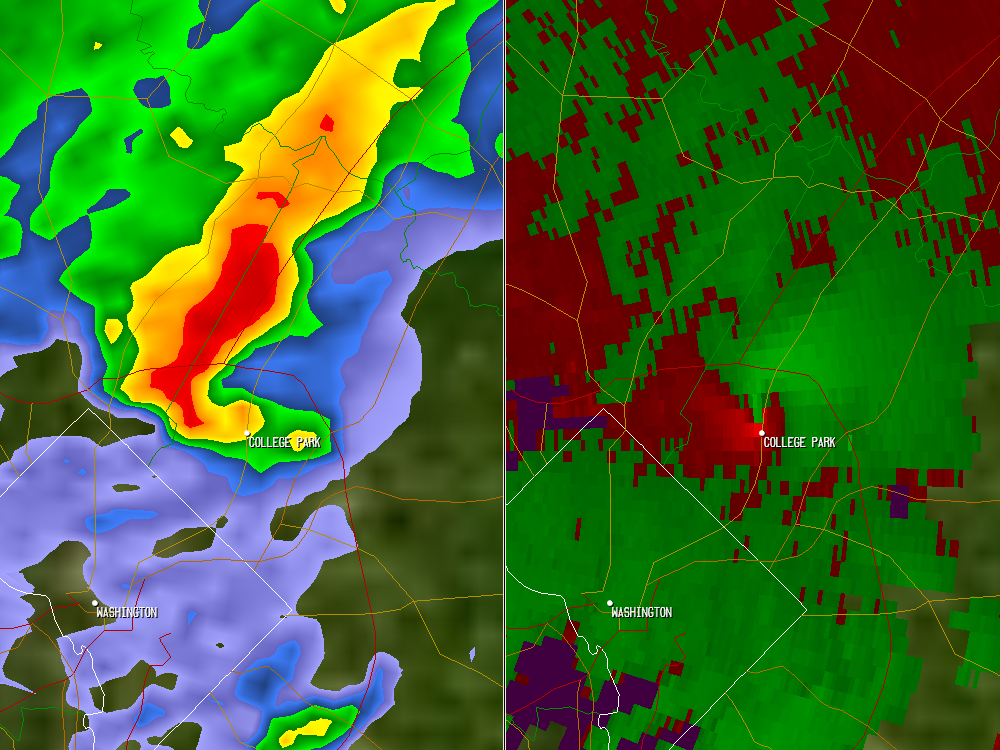
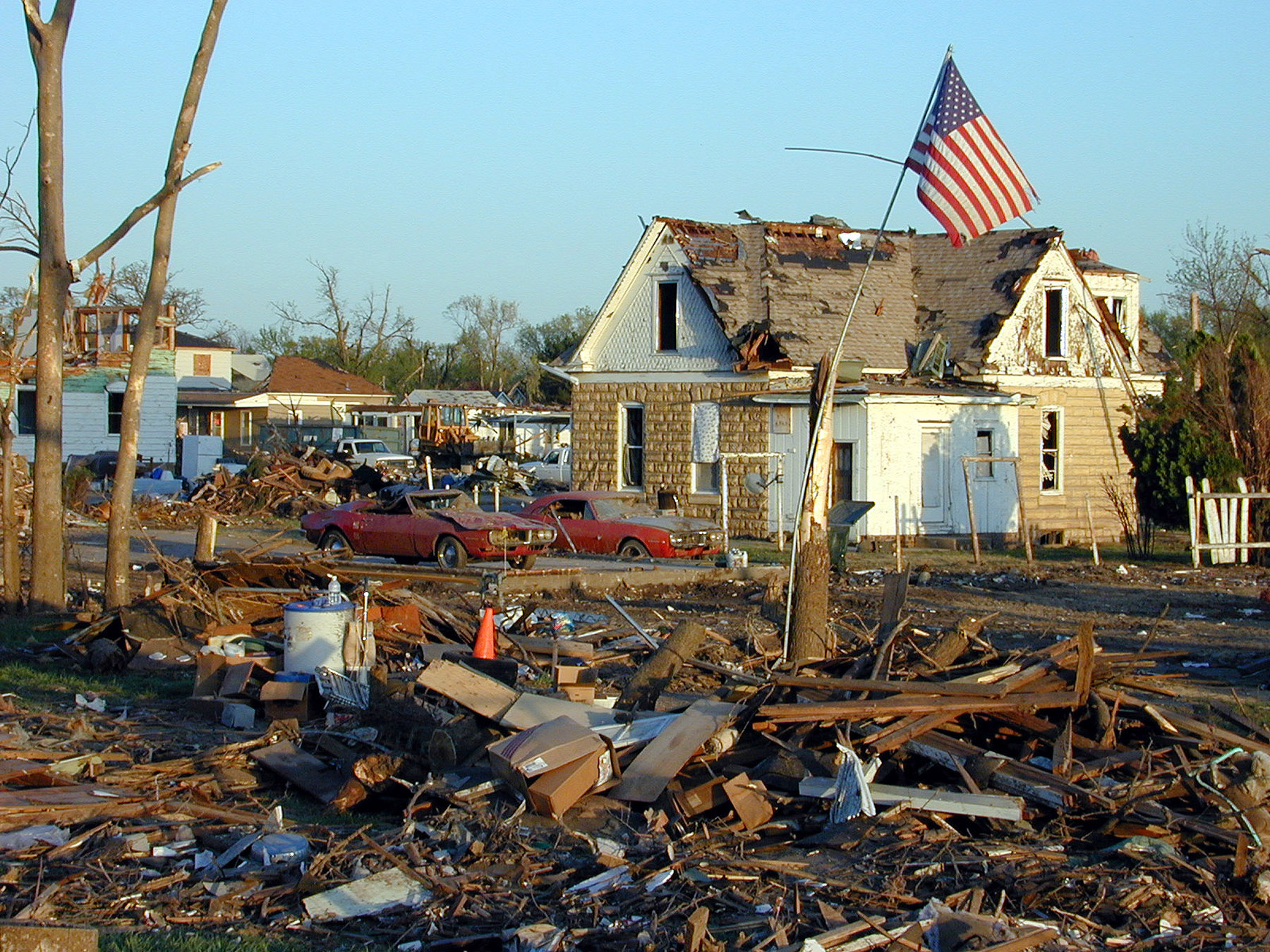
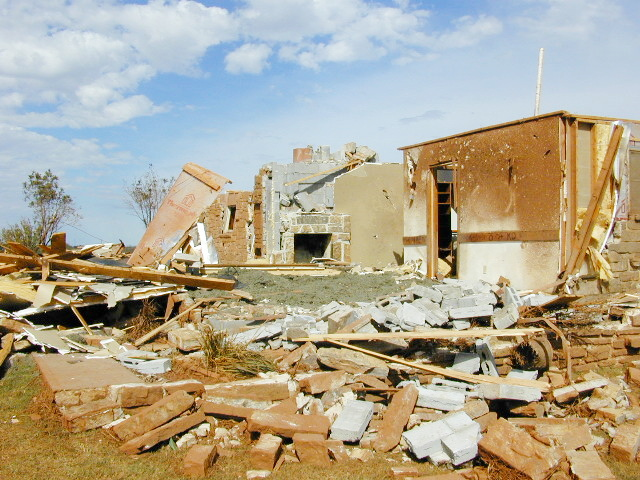
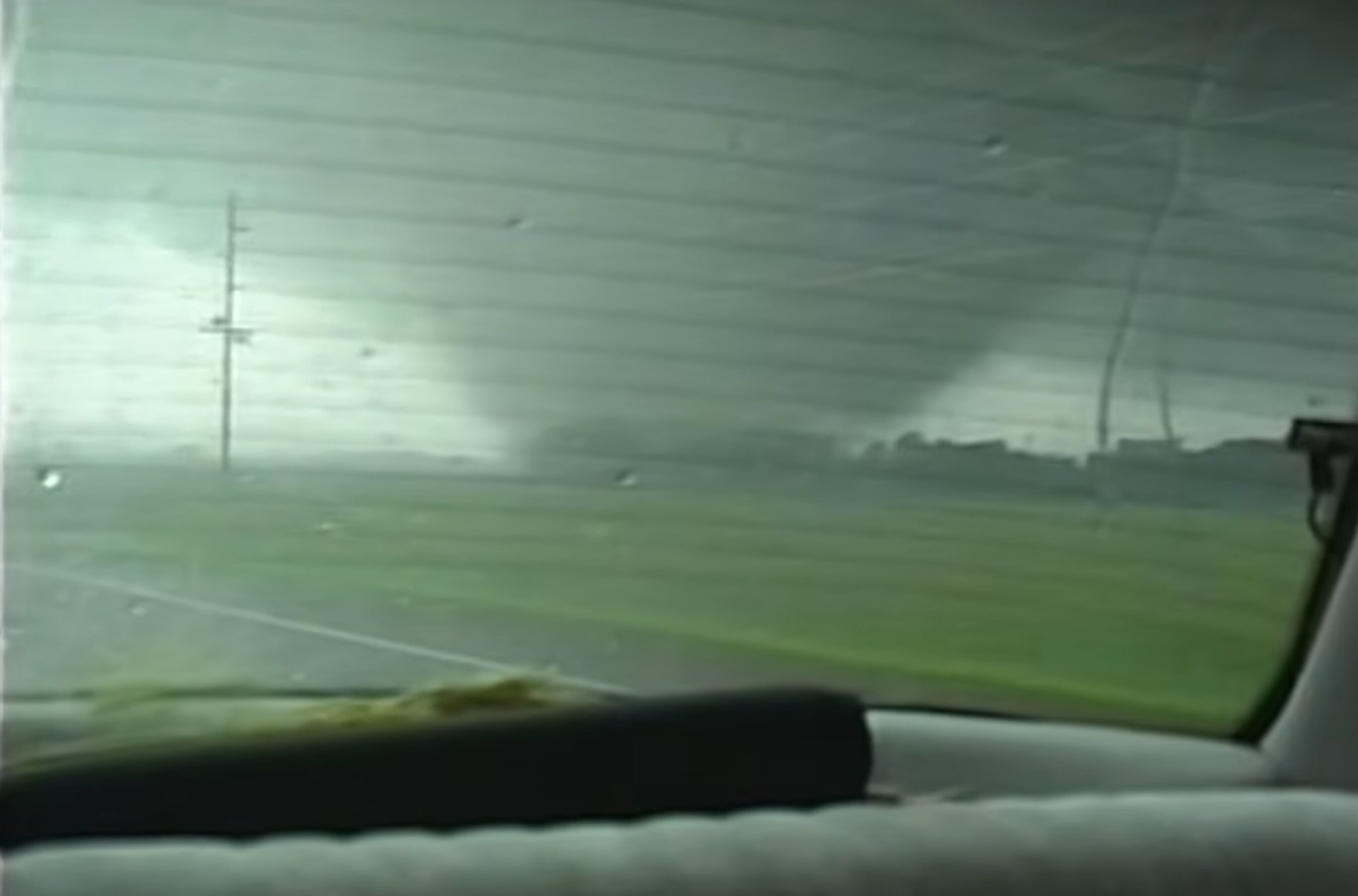
- Clockwise from top: A large F3 tornado as it tracked through Cordell, Oklahoma on October 9, A radar scan showing an F3 tornado over College Park, Maryland on September 24; F3 damage to a home near Elk City, Oklahoma after a tornado on October 9; An F3 tornado approaching Siren, Wisconsin on June 18; Damage in Hoisington, Kansas following an F4 tornado on April 21; Destroyed homes in Madison, Mississippi following an F4 tornado on November 24.
- Timespan: January - December 2001
Maximum rated tornado
F4 tornado
- List
  – Hoisington, Kansas
  on April 21
  – Ruby-Seward, Nebraska
  on June 13
  – Rixeyville, Virginia
  on September 24
  – Winterville, Mississippi
  on November 23
  – Madison, Mississippi
  on November 24
  – Altoona, Alabama
  on November 24
- Tornadoes in U.S.: 1,215
- Damage (U.S.): $630 million
- Fatalities (U.S.): 40
- Fatalities (worldwide): >40

This page documents notable tornadoes and tornado outbreaks worldwide in 2001. Strong and destructive tornadoes form most frequently in the United States, Bangladesh, and Eastern India, but they can occur almost anywhere under the right conditions. Tornadoes also develop occasionally in southern Canada during the Northern Hemisphere's summer and somewhat regularly at other times of the year across Europe, Asia, and Australia. Tornadic events are often accompanied with other forms of severe weather, including strong thunderstorms, strong winds, and hail.

== Events ==
=== United States yearly total ===
Confirmed tornadoes by Fujita rating
FU	F0	F1	F2	F3	F4	F5	Total
0	810	278	98	23	6	0	1,215

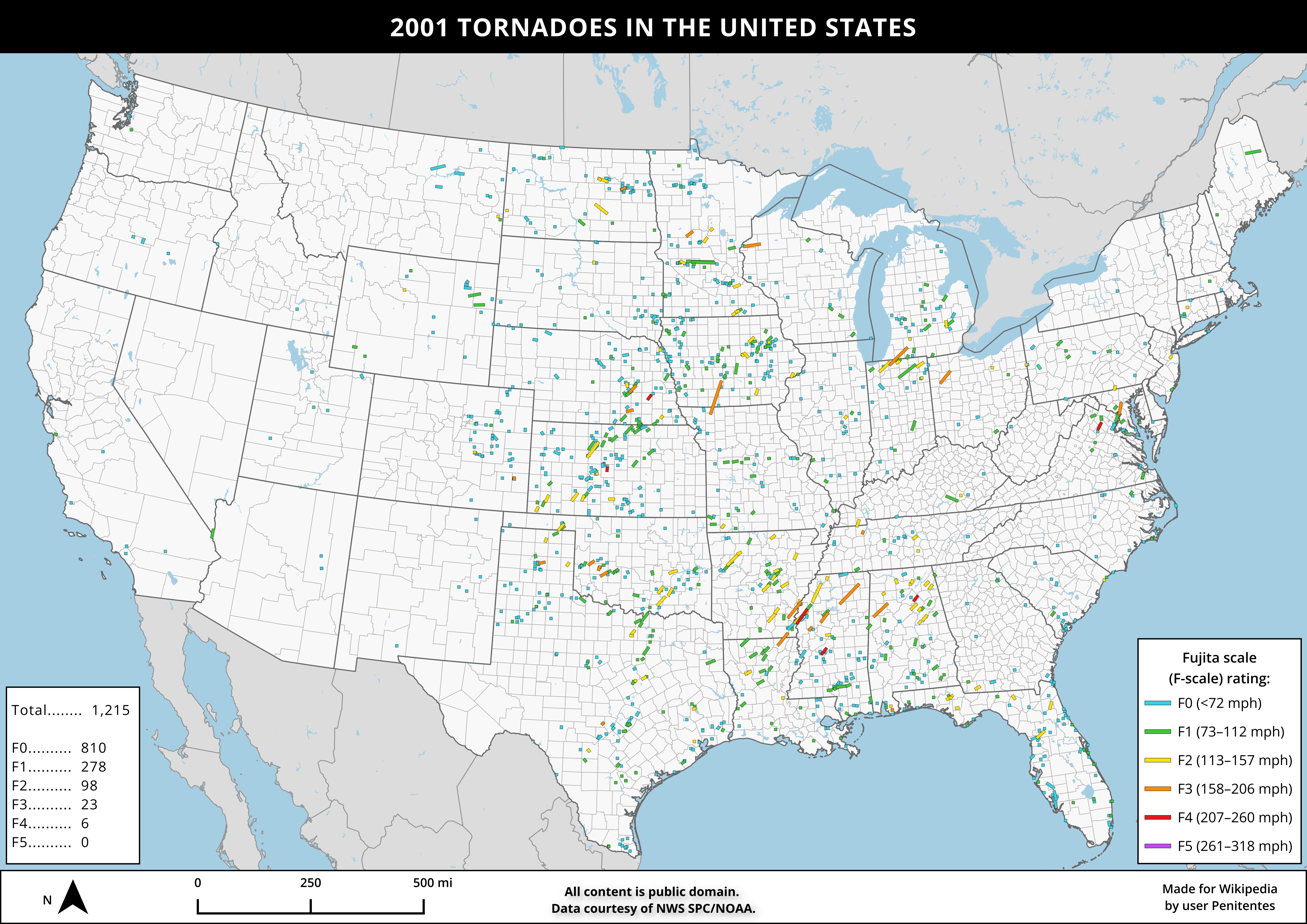
Map of 2001 United States tornado paths.

Fatal United States tornadoes in 2001
- Approximate touchdown location of killer tornadoes in 2001 Summary of tornadoes: February 16 – Mississippi (1 death); February 24 – Arkansas (1 death); February 24 – Mississippi (6 deaths); March 12 – Alabama (2 deaths); March 15 – Florida (1 death); April 10 – Missouri (1 death); April 11 – Oklahoma (1 death); April 11 – Iowa (2 deaths); April 21 – Kansas (1 death); May 31 – Tennessee (1 death); June 7 – Louisiana (1 death); June 11 – Florida (1 death); June 18 – Wisconsin (2 deaths); September 24 – Maryland (2 deaths); October 24 – Indiana (1 death); October 24 – Indiana, Michigan (1 death); November 23 – Arkansas (1 death); November 24 – Louisiana, Arkansas (3 deaths); November 24 – Mississippi (3 deaths); November 24 – Mississippi (2 deaths); November 24 – Alabama (2 deaths); November 24 – Alabama (2 deaths); November 26 – Tennessee (2 deaths); Total fatalities: 40

== January ==
There were 5 tornadoes confirmed in the United States in January.

=== January 19 ===
FU	F0	F1	F2	F3	F4	F5
0	3	1	0	0	0	0

Four minor tornadoes were caused by a bow echo in Georgia and Alabama. Four people were injured by an F0 tornado near Montgomery, Alabama. Eight more were injured when another F0 struck a shopping center near Hartsfield International Airport. Two other tornadoes in Georgia (rated F0 and an F1) caused negligible damage and no injuries.

== February ==
There were 30 tornadoes confirmed in the United States in February.

=== February 16 ===
FU	F0	F1	F2	F3	F4	F5
0	4	0	1	0	0	0

An F2 tornado touched down near Goodman, Mississippi damaging cabins, downing trees, and tossing vehicles. One woman was crushed to death by her car after abandoning it for a ditch—considered better shelter from a tornado than a vehicle. Four F0 tornadoes also occurred, with no injuries.

=== February 24–25 ===
FU	F0	F1	F2	F3	F4	F5
0	8	7	7	3	0	0

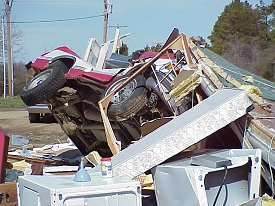
Destroyed mobile home in Arkansas from a tornado that occurred on February 24.

A moderate tornado outbreak affected several southern US states. A line of tornado-producing supercells formed out in front of a squall line which produced damaging winds. Over 10 hours, multiple tornadoes touched down and caused $35 million in damage, primarily in Arkansas and Mississippi.

The outbreak began on the 24th, and multiple tornadoes began touching down in Arkansas that evening. An F2 tornado that impacted the towns of Sweet Home and College Station, destroying homes, mobile homes, and a church. The tornado downed many trees and power lines and injured 8 people. Another F2 tornado near Union heavily damaged a dairy barn and the roofs of several homes. Many trees were downed, and three mobile homes were destroyed, resulting in a fatality and three injuries. An F3 tornado touched down near Reed, and moved northeast. Roofs were damaged at several homes. In addition, the tornado rolled a 500-gallon butane tank, damaged or destroyed metal barns and sheds, and knocked down hundreds of trees. Near the town of Kelso, the tornado completely destroyed a metal farm shop, and pieces of debris from the structure were found 6 miles away. Also near the shop, a pickup truck was mangled with several large farm implements thrown, overturned or destroyed. A tractor-trailer was flipped before the tornado dissipated near Snow Lake.

Tornado activity began to spread into Mississippi later that night, and an F3 tornado caused major damage near Greenwood. Another F3 tornado touched down near Bruce before moving east and slamming into Pontotoc, where major damage occurred. At least 360 homes, 15 businesses and 2 churches were damaged or destroyed in Pontotoc. Among the homes destroyed was a restored antebellum plantation home listed in the National Register of Historic Places. Numerous trees and power lines were blown down. Six people were killed in town, and 43 others were injured. The tornado then struck Baldwyn, where 100 homes were damaged or destroyed, and the Baldwyn High School which lost the roof to its gymnasium. Past Baldwyn, the tornado struck Guntown, where 8 homes and 1 business were heavily damaged, while 13 other structures were damaged. Lesser damage occurred in Saltillo and Wheeler before the tornado dissipated. Additional weak tornadoes occurred in Tennessee on the 25th before the event came to an end. Overall, the outbreak produced 25 tornadoes and killed 7 people.

== March ==
There were 34 confirmed tornadoes in the United States in March.

=== March 12–13 ===
FU	F0	F1	F2	F3	F4	F5
0	5	9	1	0	0	0

A small progressive tornado outbreak stretched from Texas to Georgia. At 3:30AM, an F1 tornado touched down outside of Tatum, Texas, moving into the town and causing damage to several structures. Two F0 tornadoes were reported later in the morning in and around Kentwood, Louisiana. Nine more weak tornadoes struck southern Mississippi that morning, two of which injured seven and five people in Lamar County and Forrest County, respectively. In the afternoon, an F1 tornado destroyed several mobile homes in Red Level, Alabama, killing two people and injuring another. Another F1 tornado also destroyed mobile homes near Boykin, Georgia later in the afternoon, injuring 2 people. After midnight, three tornadoes touched down in extreme northern Florida, including an F2 tornado in Hamilton County and an F1 tornado which injured five people and caused $5 million in damage to Daytona Beach.

=== March 15 ===
FU	F0	F1	F2	F3	F4	F5
0	2	0	5	0	0	0

A small outbreak of seven tornadoes struck northern Florida and southern Georgia between 4:30 and 8:30AM. An F2 tornado struck a residential area near Wausau, Florida at 4:30AM, killing one person and injuring 21. Another F2 tornado hit further north near Round Lake and Kinard, causing minimal damage. Another F2 tornadoes injured 13 in Decatur and Grady Counties in Georgia. Overall, the outbreak killed one and injured 34.

=== March 29 ===
FU	F0	F1	F2	F3	F4	F5
0	5	0	2	0	0	0

A small outbreak struck northern Florida on the morning. Two F2 and four F0 tornadoes injured one person and caused a few million dollars in damage. An additional F0 tornado was confirmed that afternoon in South Carolina.

== April ==
There were 135 tornadoes confirmed in the United States in April.

=== April 6–7 ===
FU	F0	F1	F2	F3	F4	F5
0	1	4	2	0	0	0

Six tornadoes struck Kansas, Texas, and Nebraska on April 6. The only tornado to cause casualties was an F2 tornado that injured two in Rolla, Kansas. The tornadoes were spawned by a serial derecho that caused widespread wind damage along its path.

On April 7, a rare F0 tornado touched down and caused $150,000 in damage in the Northeastern Fresno suburb of Clovis, California. Fortunately, there were no casualties.

=== April 10–11 ===
FU	F0	F1	F2	F3	F4	F5
0	37	43	16	1	0	0

An extended tornado outbreak consisting of 97 tornadoes struck the central Great Plains. The outbreak killed four, injured 18, and occurred in three stages.

It began when a strong area of storms moved across eastern Kansas and adjacent Missouri on the afternoon of the 10th. One supercell passed over northern St. Louis producing ten tornadoes, one of which (rated F1) destroyed a mobile home, killing one and injuring two. Tornadoes occurred as far east as southwestern Illinois, but the supercell is more memorable for exceptionally widespread large hail. With some hailstones up to baseball size, the swath is the largest continuous in areal coverage and longest in length and duration of very large hail known. Because of the extensive area and heavily populated areas impacted, it is the costliest hailstorm in U.S. history, with $2 billion of insured losses.

The next stage of the outbreak was a swarm of tornadoes which formed on the night of the 10th into the pre-dawn hours of the 11th in Texas, Oklahoma, Kansas and Nebraska. One person was killed and eleven were injured in this stage, mostly by F2 tornadoes.

After a short break, a third bunch of tornadoes were spawned in and close to the state of Iowa in the late morning through the afternoon. Mostly weaker tornadoes, there were a few significant tornadoes. One, rated F2, destroyed a lodge in the town of Agency, killing two people and injuring three. All told, more than $23 million in damage was attributed to the entire outbreak.

=== April 21 ===
FU	F0	F1	F2	F3	F4	F5
0	9	1	1	0	1	0

A rare F1 tornado struck the three state junction area of California, Arizona, and Nevada, crossing the Colorado River and causing minimal damage.

Additionally, an outbreak of 11 tornadoes hit Central Kansas. While most of them were weak, one unexpected F4 tornado struck without a tornado warning being issued. Touching down just outside Hoisington, it tore a two-block-wide path through the north and west sides of town, completely destroying almost 200 homes and businesses and damaging another 230. The roof of the local hospital was partially torn off, and vehicles were tossed and mangled. The tornado caused $43 million in damage. 28 people were injured, and one man was killed by a flying vehicle. This outbreak also included an F2 tornado which heavily damaged two farms, and nine scattered F0 tornadoes.

== May ==
There were 240 tornadoes confirmed in the United States in May.

=== May 1 ===
FU	F0	F1	F2	F3	F4	F5
0	6	2	2	0	0	0

An outbreak of 10 tornadoes struck Minnesota and Wisconsin. One, an F2, damaged 100 homes in Glenville, Minnesota, resulting in $20 million in damage. Fortunately, the outbreak did not cause any casualties.

=== May 9–10 ===
FU	F0	F1	F2	F3	F4	F5
0	16	2	3	0	0	0

On May 9, A small tornado outbreak passed mostly over open fields in Minnesota. One F2 tornado did cause significant damage—one man was injured, and at least 30 structures were damaged or destroyed resulting in $20 million of damage. The other nine tornadoes were rated F0.

The next day, 12 tornadoes, including two F2 twisters, touched down across Central Iowa. Although more than $300,000 in damage was done, there were no injuries. An F0 tornado was also confirmed in Illinois. Overall, the two days produced 21 tornadoes, and one injury.

=== May 20–21 ===
FU	F0	F1	F2	F3	F4	F5
0	43	11	4	0	0	0

A moderate outbreak of 32 tornadoes stretched across much of Kansas, Oklahoma, and Arkansas. All the tornadoes were weak except for a significant F2 tornado near Dustin, Oklahoma.

The next day, another moderate outbreak occurred, mainly on the Lower Peninsula of Michigan as well as eastern Ohio, West Virginia, and Texas. An F2 touched down in Hartland, Michigan, and caused significant damage to the town, mostly to hundreds of damaged and totaled vehicles. This tornado also destroyed a towing company and damaged a manufacturing plant to the north. Three people were injured by this tornado. Three others were injured in three separate F1 tornadoes, in Elwell, Michigan, Shepherd, Michigan, and Canton, Ohio. The May 21 outbreak caused more than $7 million in damage.

=== May 26 ===
A supercell thunderstorm produced an F2 tornado that touched down on the northeast side of Fort Wayne, Indiana, causing $6.5 million in damage to a shopping center, a retirement home, and several houses.

=== May 27–29 ===
FU	F0	F1	F2	F3	F4	F5
0	42	7	3	2	0	0

On May 27, two separate outbreaks occurred over the Eastern United States and the Great Plains. In the East, five tornadoes touched down, including an F2 tornado which caused $1 million in damage north of Manalapan, New Jersey. In the Plains, seven weak tornadoes touched in Kansas and Oklahoma.

On May 28, five F0 tornadoes touched down in the Southeast. Meanwhile in Colorado, a stationary supercell dropped large amounts of rain and hail near Ellicott, as well as four brief weak F0 tornadoes. Two F2 tornadoes and an F1 tornado also caused a combined 13 injuries throughout the state.

On May 29, A moderate tornado outbreak hit the southwestern Great Plains, mainly in the form of F0 tornadoes in Colorado, Kansas, and the Texas Panhandle. One supercell produced six weak landspouts and a large F3 tornado near Lamar, Colorado. The Lamar tornado completely destroyed a modular home and five vehicles in its vicinity, and damaged two other homes nearby. Eleven power poles were destroyed as well. Another F3 destroyed a home and an office building near Panhandle, Texas. The only casualty from this outbreak was from a large F1 tornado which blew over a semi-truck outside of Quanah, Texas, badly injuring the driver.

=== May 29 (Poland) ===
An F2 tornado touched down in Podhale region in Poland, and damaged 144 buildings in Morawczyna and Bielanka, Nowy Targ County.

=== May 31–June 3 ===
FU	F0	F1	F2	F3	F4	F5
0	41	6	2	0	0	0

Four tornadoes touched down in Tennessee and extreme southern Kentucky. One F2 tornado destroyed several structures, killing one person and injuring two people in Auburntown, Tennessee. One of the injuries was to a pregnant woman, who also lost her baby. Six other tornadoes were touched down elsewhere.

June 1 saw an outbreak of 18 weak tornadoes struck the state of Iowa. Additionally, an F1 tornado injured three people in Menola, North Carolina. Six other weak tornadoes were confirmed elsewhere.

June 2 saw an F2 tornado hit London, Kentucky, causing major damage to shopping centers, vehicles, and mobile homes, injuring ten people. Three other F0 tornadoes were confirmed that day as well.

On May 3, a rare F0 tornado touched down in Añasco. No injuries were reported, but several roofs were detached. Nine other F0 tornadoes were confirmed on the mainland, causing very minor damage and no injuries.

== June ==
There were 249 tornadoes confirmed in the United States in June.

=== June 7 ===
FU	F0	F1	F2	F3	F4	F5
0	6	1	0	0	0	0

An F1 tornado blew a tree down onto a truck in Zachary, Louisiana, killing the driver. Six F0 tornadoes were also confirmed elsewhere.

=== June 11–13 ===
FU	F0	F1	F2	F3	F4	F5
0	78	20	3	1	1	0

A minor outbreak produced 19 tornadoes in Minnesota and Wisconsin on June 11, which included a high risk that was issued by the Storm Prediction Center. The most notable of these was a large F2 tornado which struck Benson, Minnesota, injuring seven people (one critically) and causing $10 million in damage. A progressive derecho also produced widespread wind damage. In an unrelated storm system, a man was killed in his living room by a tree blown down by an F0 tornado in Jacksonville, Florida.

On June 12, the remnants of Tropical Storm Allison produced 10 tornadoes in South Carolina and Georgia, all weak and brief in duration. A total of 22 other weak tornadoes were reported across the northern Great Plains as well.

June 13 saw a fairly large tornado outbreak of mostly weak tornadoes occurred in the Central Plains, however four of the tornado were strong to violent. A destructive F3 tornado passed near Parkers Prairie, Minnesota. Many irrigation systems were overturned, trees, power poles, and lines were snapped, and grain bins destroyed by the strong wind. An estimated 100 poles were broken off leaving nearly 1,100 people without power. Several farmsteads were heavily damaged or destroyed in the area, and three people were injured. A large and slow-moving F4 tornado occurred near Ruby, Nebraska. The tornado destroyed an entire farmstead, along with several propane and anhydrous ammonia tanks. Several vehicles were tumbled and tossed into a field across from the farm house. Barns, machine sheds, and outbuildings were destroyed as well. An F2 tornado near Flensburg, Minnesota tore the roof off of a house and destroyed several outbuildings. A large half-mile wide tornado also touched down near Brainerd, Minnesota. The tornado tore roofs off houses and blew out exterior walls. Pole barns and sheds were destroyed, and windows were blown out. Thousands of trees were knocked down, and 41 head of livestock were killed as well. The Brainerd tornado was rated F2. Overall, the outbreak produced 36 tornadoes.

=== June 18 ===
FU	F0	F1	F2	F3	F4	F5
0	4	1	0	1	0	0

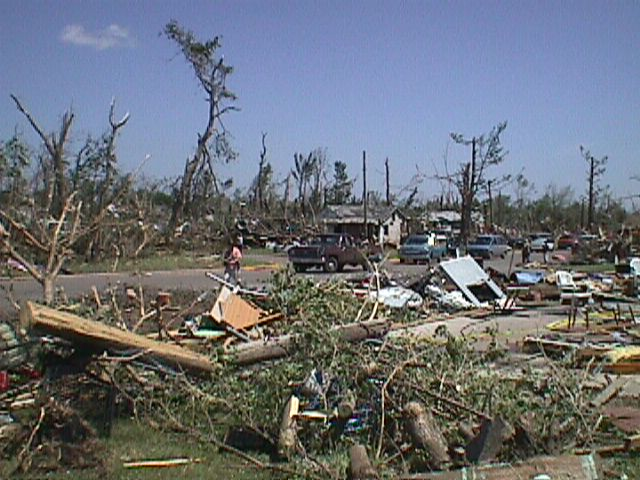
Tornado damage in Siren, Wisconsin

Two people were killed, with 16 injured, by an F3 tornado in Wisconsin. It first caused severe damage as a mile-wide tornado in the town of Siren, where it destroyed 200 homes. The three deaths occurred in Dewey Township, where many homes were destroyed. About 14,000 acres (57 km^{2}) of trees were downed along its 30-mile path. Five other weak tornadoes were confirmed during the outbreak.

=== June 23 ===
FU	F0	F1	F2	F3	F4	F5
0	1	2	1	0	0	0

After an F1 tornado touched down in Florida, an isolated supercell produced three tornadoes in Connecticut. The first, rated F1, hit a golf course in the town of Washington, demolishing a storage building and a tennis court, and injuring one person. The second tornado, rated F2, touched down in Torrington near Torrington Middle School, damaging the roof and destroying bleachers and a storage shed. Finally, an F0 tornado, produced minor damage to the East Hartland fire station.

== July ==
There were 120 tornadoes confirmed in the United States in July.

=== July 6 ===
FU	F0	F1	F2	F3	F4	F5
0	0	1	1	0	0	0

Two tornadoes struck Myrtle Beach, South Carolina. The first tornado was rated F1 and crossed US 17 in North Myrtle Beach. It was only on the ground for 0.1 mi (0.16 km). The second tornado moved slowly down the beach, alternately moving on and offshore several times, and causing significant damage, including blown-out windows, tipped-over busses, and damaged roofs and utility poles. A total of 39 people received minor injuries from this second tornado, which was rated F2. Damage from the tornadoes is estimated to be up to $8,000,000 - with an estimated $1,000,000 damages associated with vehicles. Four thousand residents were without power during the worst parts of the storm. Near southern Myrtle Beach, evidence was found for three other damage paths that were estimated to have F0 and F1 strength. These tornadoes caused roof and tree damage. However, they were not added to the official database.

=== July 17–18 ===
FU	F0	F1	F2	F3	F4	F5
0	31	4	2	1	0	0

July 17, saw a 12 tornadoes touched down in Minnesota and Nebraska. A lone, half-mile wide F2 tornado caused $1.5 million in damage on a 30-mile path through North Dakota, but no injuries were reported.

On July 18, a moderate outbreak of weak tornadoes occurred across The Dakotas and Minnesota. Aside from an F3 tornado near Pekin, North Dakota and an F2 in south of Bowdle, South Dakota, no significant damage was reported.

== August ==
There were 69 tornadoes confirmed in the United States in August.

== September ==
There were 84 tornadoes confirmed in the United States in September.

=== September 24 ===
FU	F0	F1	F2	F3	F4	F5
0	3	3	1	1	1	0

Six tornadoes struck in and around the D.C. Metro Area, two of which were significant. The first, a destructive F4 tornado, touched down in Culpeper County near Rixeyville, completely destroying a brick home, then destroying several mobile homes, injuring two. In Jeffersonton, it damaged or destroyed a dozen structures. It passed into Fauquier County, damaging a large forested area and a barn.

Another tornado passed through densely populated areas in Fairfax and Arlington Counties into Washington D.C., causing F1 damage. Shortly afterward, the worst tornado of the outbreak touched down from the same supercell in northern D.C., near Children's Hospital. This tornado was a large multiple vortex tornado, but caused no major damage until it reached Hyattsville. From there, it rapidly strengthened, causing F3 damage as it approached the University of Maryland western campus. There, 48 people were injured by flying debris. Additionally, two women were killed when the car they were in was thrown over an eight-story building into a wooded area. The tornado then turned into a residential area, causing major damage, and approached I-95. Miraculously, even though there were thousands of cars in traffic on the highway, only one truck was flipped over. Continuing north-northeast, the tornado continued to cause significant damage to trees, residences, and other structures, including the National Agricultural Research Center and several schools, before finally lifting in Howard County, near Columbia. This tornado caused $100 million in damage.

Another tornado caused F2 damage in Pennsylvania, and other touchdowns occurred New York and North Carolina. In all, the outbreak of nine tornadoes caused more than $105 million in damage, killed two people, and injured 59.

== October ==
There were 117 tornadoes confirmed in the United States in October.

=== October 9 ===
FU	F0	F1	F2	F3	F4	F5
0	16	9	1	4	0	0

An unusual October tornado outbreak occurred across the Great Plains states of Oklahoma and Nebraska. A large multiple-vortex F3 tornado caused considerable damage near Polk, Nebraska, and blew a farmhouse off its foundation into some nearby trees. An F2 tornado near Fullerton tore the roof off of a house and destroyed two metal outbuildings.

In Oklahoma, a destructive F3 tornado ripped directly through the town of Cordell, where major damage occurred and 9 people were injured. 447 homes were damaged, 132 of which were left uninhabitable. 40 businesses were damaged as well, 22 of which were left uninhabitable. Some of the homes in town were leveled, and an F4 rating was considered, though it was later determined that these homes were not well-built. The Cordell tornado caused $100,000,000 in damage. Another F3 tornado touched down near Elk City and moved east through rural areas. Fences and trees were knocked down, and a brick home was left with only a few interior walls standing. Yet another F3 tornado passed near Mountain View, flattening a diesel shop, an unanchored home, a barn, a garage, and an old schoolhouse near the beginning of the path. Several vehicles and pieces of farm equipment were tossed and destroyed in that area as well. Further along the path, a farm was leveled and 3 homes sustained major damage. A 10,000-gallon diesel tank was thrown a quarter-mile nearby. The tornado dissipated after injuring one person. Overall, the outbreak produced 30 tornadoes.

=== October 24 ===
FU	F0	F1	F2	F3	F4	F5
0	7	11	5	2	0	0

A total of 25 tornadoes touched down during a large outbreak across the Great Lakes and Mississippi Valley.

The outbreak was caused by an extremely deep low pressure system that was detected as early as Saturday, October 20 moving in on the coast of California. The Storm Prediction Center was already predicting a chance of thunderstorms on Wednesday. The area forecast discussion started mentioning a "severe potential" on Tuesday, also mentioning "severe storms with large hail and damaging winds possible". By the morning of October 24, the SPC was on its highest alert after issuing a high risk for severe weather for Indiana, middle Kentucky, eastern Illinois, southern Michigan, and western Ohio. The surrounding area was in a slight risk. At 5:00 A.M., a severe weather outlook was issued highlighting the fact that the area was under a high risk as well as a possibility of tornadoes. By 11:30 A.M., the SPC issued a Public Severe Weather Outlook calling for "intense tornadoes" in the area. Just 15 minutes later, the SPC issued a Particularly Dangerous Situation Tornado Watch for northern Indiana, and northwestern Ohio.

At around 12:30 P.M., a line of storms began forming in central and eastern Illinois and moved east. The town of Monticello, Illinois was struck by an F2 tornado, where homes and businesses were severely damaged. At around 3:12 P.M., a tornado warning was issued for LaPorte County. This tornado killed a 50-year-old woman when her modular home was swept away near LaPorte. At 3:15, another tornado watch was issued for southern Michigan.

Oct 24: Tornado vortex signatures as seen by the North Webster WSR-88D radar.

At 3:46, another tornado warning was issued for St. Joseph County, Indiana and southeastern Berrien County, Michigan and Cass County. A few minutes later, the strongest of the outbreak, rated F3, touched down and did major damage to buildings in Crumstown, a town near South Bend. The line moved into South Bend at exactly 4:05 P.M., producing 89 mph (140 km/h) winds at the airport. The tornado that hit Crumstown later hit Niles in Berrien County, then moved east-northeast into Cass County and dissipated in northwestern Saint Joseph County, Michigan. Two people were injured by the Crumstown tornado, and one man later died of his injuries. The storms prompted tornado warnings in Kalamazoo and Calhoun counties, and skies reportedly turned very green as the storms approached. The storms caused major damage to the Schoolcraft area of Kalamazoo County, where straight line winds in excess of 120 miles per hour were reported, causing a golf dome to blow away, ripping the roof off a house, ripping the front wall of a brick house off and twisting irrigation sprinkler systems. Strong winds were also reported in the City of Kalamazoo. In Calhoun County, strong straight line winds also struck near Tekonsha, causing damage.

Other weaker tornadoes touched down in Mishawaka and moved northeast into Elkhart County. In Elkhart County, one of two separate tornadoes hit a Toll Road Maintenance Building and the other briefly touched down in the Cobus Green Trailer Court to the south-doing some damage to a few trailers. Another tornado damaged a trailer and a house in Marshall County and moved east into Kosciusko County and dissipated in Noble County. This particular tornado was photographed by meteorologists as it came near their forecast office in North Webster. Prior to the photo being taken, the tornado hit a factory on the north side of Warsaw, Indiana.

Later in the evening the severe storm produced straight line winds through the campus of Michigan State University downing many trees and damaging buildings. The National Weather Service estimates most of the downbursts through East Lansing were between 60-80 mph, with one reaching 120 mph (190 km/h). The supercell that passed through East Lansing also spawned two tornadoes in the Saginaw area. By 5:30 p.m., the severe weather moved out of Indiana and into Ohio where damage was not as severe. One tornado was reported in Ohio, an F3 tornado that moved from Paulding County into Putnam County. That tornado caused major structural damage to buildings near Fort Jennings, Ohio. The severity of the activity began to wane later that evening. By 7:30 P.M., all severe weather watches were discontinued.

== November ==
There were 110 tornadoes confirmed in the United States in November.

=== November 23–24 ===
FU	F0	F1	F2	F3	F4	F5
0	22	22	18	3	3	0

A powerful storm system produced a series of strong tornadoes across the Southern United States. An F3 tornado tracked from the city of Bastrop, Louisiana to the small town of Parkdale, Arkansas, killing 3. An F4 tornado killed 2 people as it tracked just north of Jackson, Mississippi. A total of 13 people were killed. It was one of the most intense autumnal tornado outbreaks on record.

== December ==
There were 22 tornadoes confirmed in the United States in December.

=== December 26 (Australia) ===
A waterspout hit several yachts during the Sydney to Hobart Yacht Race. No major injuries were reported, but several boats had to drop out of the race due to damage from the waterspout and golfball-size hail.

== See also ==
- Tornado
  - Tornadoes by year
  - Tornado records
  - Tornado climatology
  - Tornado myths
- List of tornado outbreaks
  - List of F5 and EF5 tornadoes
  - List of F4 and EF4 tornadoes
  - List of North American tornadoes and tornado outbreaks
  - List of 21st-century Canadian tornadoes and tornado outbreaks
  - List of European tornadoes and tornado outbreaks
  - List of tornadoes and tornado outbreaks in Asia
  - List of Southern Hemisphere tornadoes and tornado outbreaks
  - List of tornadoes striking downtown areas
  - List of tornadoes with confirmed satellite tornadoes
- Tornado intensity
  - Fujita scale
  - Enhanced Fujita scale
  - International Fujita scale
  - TORRO scale
