= Weather of 2000 =

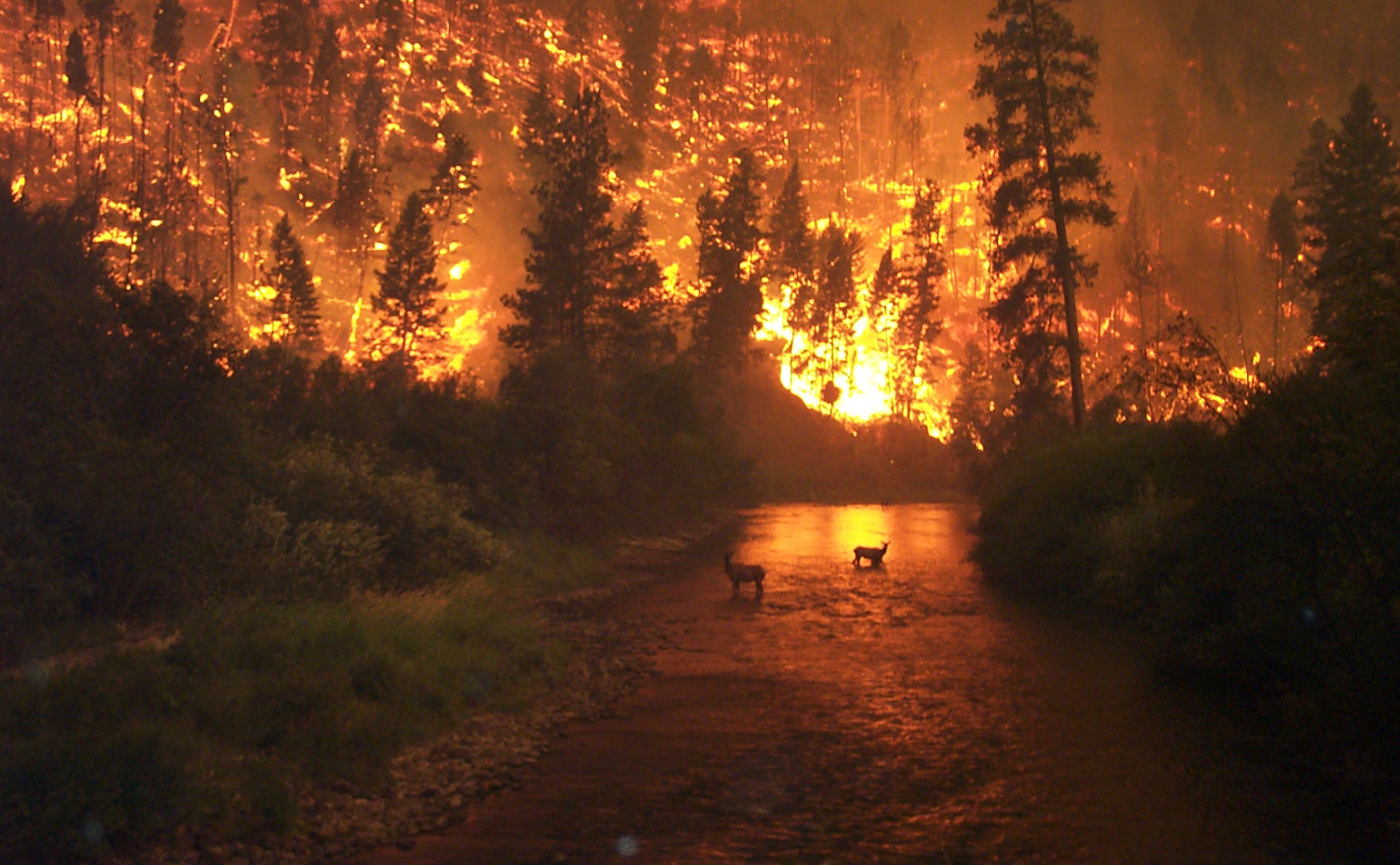
A wildfire in Bitterroot National Forest in Montana on August 6

The following is a list of weather events that occurred on Earth in the year 2000. The year began with a La Niña. There were several natural disasters around the world from various types of weather, including floods, droughts, heat waves, tornadoes, and tropical cyclones. The deadliest disaster were the 2000 Mozambique Floods which killed 800 people, and the costliest event of the year was Typhoon Saomai, which caused $6.3 billion (2000 USD) in damages.

== Winter storms and cold waves ==
In January, an extremely powerful and historic blizzard, commonly referred to as the Carolina Crusher, hit parts of North Carolina and Central Virginia on January 25, causing thousands of power outages within the area leaving 11 inches of snow in Richmond, VA and 20.3 inches in Raleigh-Durham International Airport before moving out to the Atlantic.

In December, a significant nor'easter impacted the Mid-Atlantic and New England regions of the United States around the end of the month. It began as an Alberta clipper that moved southeastward through the central United States and weakened over the Ohio Valley. The storm dropped heavy precipitation throughout the Northeast, especially in northern New Jersey and eastern New York, where snowfall often exceeded 2 ft (0.61 m). Even so, as it struck on a weekend, its effects were generally minor and mostly limited to travel delays, traffic accidents, and business closures.

== Droughts, heat waves, and wildfires ==
The 2000 California wildfire season produced multiple wildfires, killing 1 or more people and injuring multiple others. Over 130 buildings were destroyed during the season, amounting to $154 million (2000 USD) in damages. The Storrie Fire on August 17 caused $22 million (2000 USD) in damages, and burned 55,261 acres of land.

In August and September, a large heat wave affected parts of the southern United States, with highs commonly peaking well over 100 °F.

== Floods ==
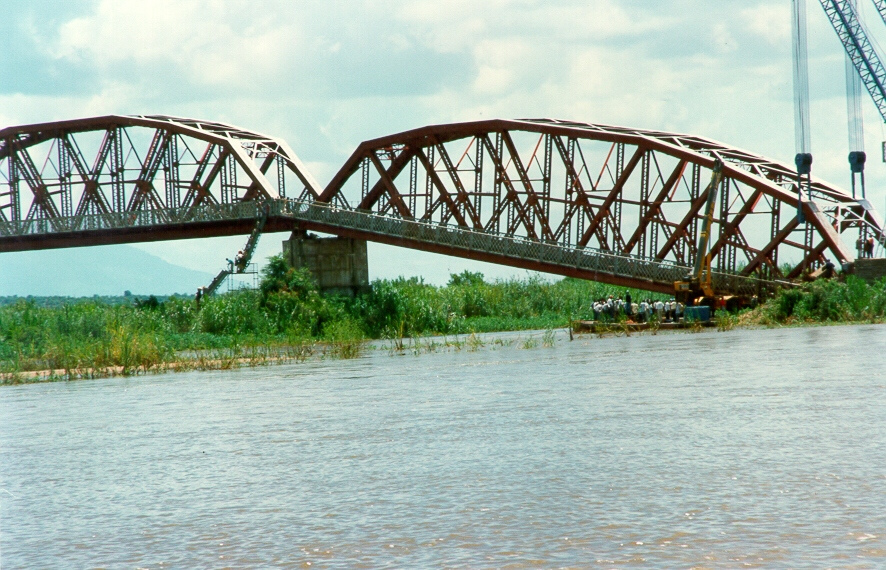
The Sena Bridge, the collapse was caused by heavy flooding in Mozambique.

In February and March, a large and deadly flood in Mozambique killed 800 people. The flood caused $500 million (2000 USD) in damages, and is one of Mozambique's worst-ever floods.

The Autumn of 2000 was the wettest recorded in the United Kingdom since records began in 1766. Several regions of Atlantic Europe from France to Norway received double their average rainfall and there were severe floods and landslides in the southern Alps.

The United Kingdom saw the most extensive nationwide flooding event since the snow-melt of 1947. Prior to 1947, three similar events occurred in the second half of the 19th century where prolonged rainfall led to widespread flooding throughout England in the month of November, in 1894, 1875, and 1852.

In November, a catastrophic flood occurred in Hawaii. The floods led to $70 million (2000 USD) in damage, but there were no fatalities. The flood was indirectly triggered by Tropical Storm Paul.

== Tornadoes ==
There were 1,075 tornadoes in the United States alone, collectively resulting in 41 deaths.

- On February 13 and 14, a deadly tornado outbreak killed 18 people, caused 23 injuries and caused more than $20 million (2000 USD) in damages. It was the single deadliest tornado outbreak in the United States between June 1999 and October 2002.
- On March 28, a small but deadly tornado outbreak caused extensive damage in downtown Fort Worth, Texas, causing damage to skyscrapers and other buildings. 2 people were killed by this tornado, and 80 more were injured. $450 million (2000 USD) were recorded. Another F3 tornado touched down as part of the outbreak, but caused little damage and no injuries.
- On April 23, a tornado outbreak produced 33 tornadoes across Oklahoma, Texas, Arkansas, and Louisiana, with three of these being rated F3. An F1 tornado moved through Shreveport, Louisiana, injuring six people and causing $10,000+ (2000 USD) in damages. In total, 12 people were injured, but no fatalities were recorded.
- On May 11 and 12, an F3 tornado killed one person near Cedar Falls, Iowa. Another F3 tornado caused two fatalities in Laguna Park, Texas.
- On May 17 and 18, a small storm system produced 69 tornadoes. One tornado was rated F3, and caused damage to multiple buildings. 2 people were injured.
- On July 14 an F3 tornado touched down and moved toward Green Acres Campground at Pine Lake, Alberta. 12 people at the campground were killed and over 100 were injured. Winds of up to 300 km/h (190 mph) caused $15.2 million (2000 Canadian dollars) in damage to the campground. It was the fourth-deadliest tornado in Canadian history.
- On July 25, a small outbreak produced 12 tornadoes, one of which was a violent tornado that hit the city of Granite Falls in Yellow Medicine County, and the tornado killed one person and injured 15 others. It is one of the strongest tornadoes in Minnesota history.
- On September 20, an F4 tornado struck Xenia, Ohio, killing 1 person and injuring 100 others. The tornado damaged over 150 homes.
- On December 16, a mid-sized outbreak produced 24 tornadoes, and an F4 tornado in Tuscaloosa, Alabama killed 11 people and injured 144. It was the strongest tornado to hit Alabama since 1950.

== Tropical cyclones ==
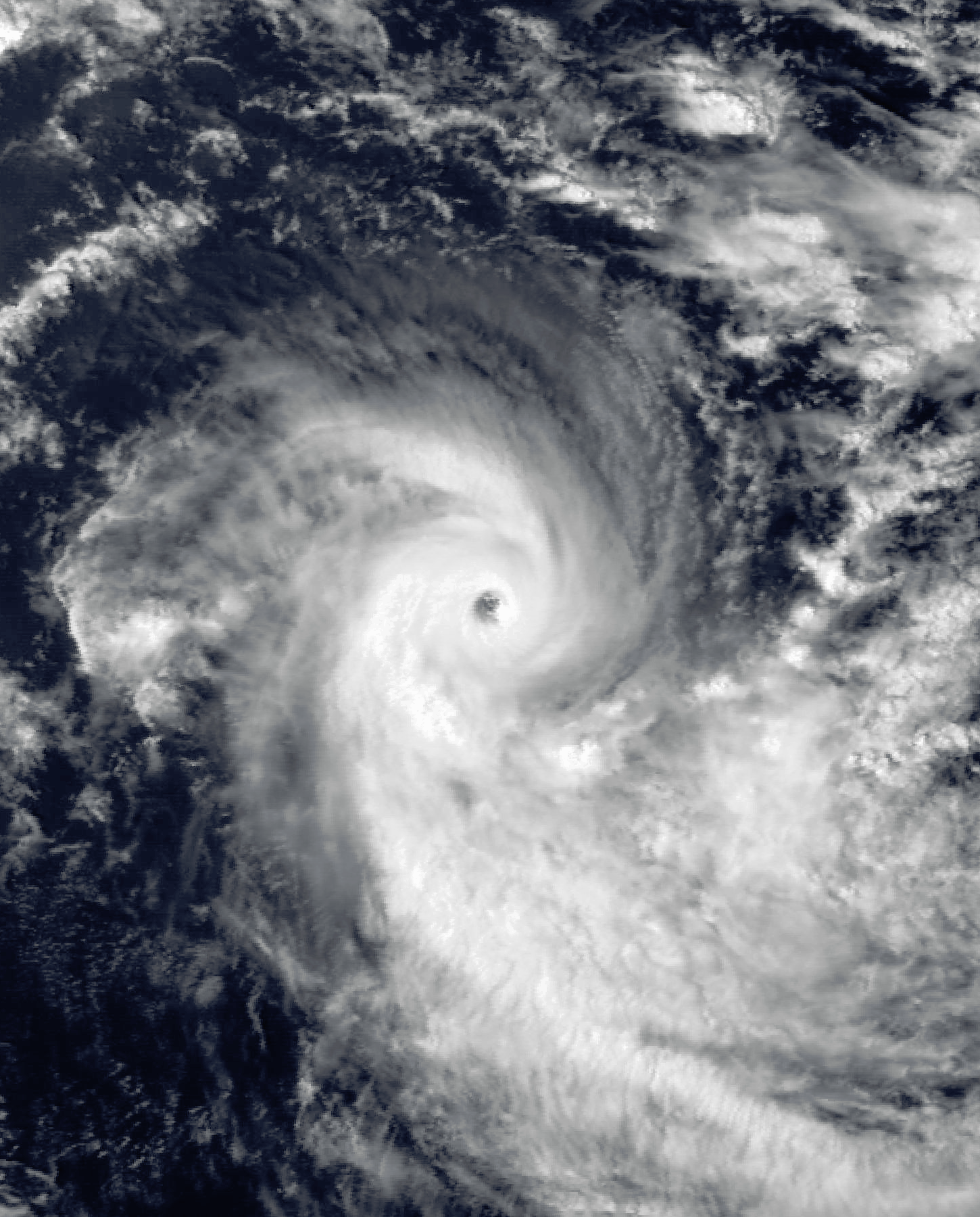
Cyclone Connie on January 28

During 2000, tropical cyclones formed in seven different areas called basins, located within various parts of the Atlantic, Pacific, and Indian Oceans. A total of 140 tropical cyclones formed within bodies of water known as tropical cyclone basins, with 81 of them being further named by their responsible weather agencies when they attained maximum sustained winds of 35 knots (65 km/h; 40 mph). The strongest storm of the year was Cyclone Hudah, peaking with a minimum pressure of 905 hPa (26.72 inHg), and with 10-minute sustained winds of 220 km/h (135 mph). The highest confirmed number of deaths from a storm was from Typhoon Kai-tak, which killed 188 people, however, Leon–Eline may have killed up to 722 people. The costliest storm was Saomai, which caused $6.3 billion in damage. The accumulated cyclone energy (ACE) index for the 2000 (seven basins combined), as calculated by Colorado State University was 677.3 units.

There was an above-average number of storms during the year; the most active basin of the year was the Western Pacific, where a below-average 23 named storms formed. The Eastern Pacific and the North Atlantic were both relatively above-average, with 19 named storms forming in the Eastern Pacific and 15 in the North Atlantic. The Southern Hemisphere was also relatively average. Three Category 5 tropical cyclones were formed in 2000.

Global weather by year
Preceded by 1999	Weather of 2000	Succeeded by 2001
