= List of tornadoes in Washington, D.C. =

Although it is a relatively small geographical area and tornadoes are a relatively rare phenomenon in the Mid-Atlantic region, tornadoes are not unknown in Washington, D.C. The District has been hit by at least ten of these damaging storms since modern recordkeeping began in 1950.

The surrounding states of Virginia and Maryland average 10 and 6 tornadoes per year, respectively, which is 0.23 and 0.48 tornadoes per 1,000 square miles (2,600 km^{2}) per year. In the same time period (1953–2004), Washington experienced only two tornadoes. However, this works out to around 0.56 tornadoes per 1,000 square miles (2,600 km^{2}) per year, which is not statistically higher than average for the surrounding area. The climatological peak for tornado occurrences in the area is in July; however, most Washington tornadoes have struck in May, while some have formed as early as April and as late as November.

One tornado of particular historical significance is the 1814 storm. Although there is some debate as to whether this storm was a true tornado, it likely killed some British soldiers, heavy rains helped extinguish the fires set by the British, and the losses suffered contributed to their withdrawal from the city. More recent tornadoes have damaged several national landmarks, including the National Mall, the National Arboretum, the United States Botanic Garden, and the Smithsonian Institution. Another tornado occurred just two weeks after the September 11 attacks in 2001, crossing the National Mall and narrowly missing the Pentagon.

== The 1814 storm ==
On August 25, 1814: A "most tremendous hurricane" struck the city during the Burning of Washington during the War of 1812. There are few historical accounts of this event, and many sources disagree on the details. Some sources question whether this event was a tornado or a hurricane. However, most agree that it was a true tornado, and some maintain that it was a tornado followed closely by a hurricane.

Whatever its nature, the storm tore the roofs from many buildings. Several cannons were thrown through the air by the violent winds. Thirty British soldiers and some residents were buried in the rubble, and several died. Damage to trees also occurred "higher in the country." The British Army left Washington soon after the storm, and heavy rains which accompanied the storm helped extinguish the fires. At least thirty people died.

== Other early tornadoes ==
Around 3:15 pm on September 16, 1888, an F2 tornado touched down between 9th Street NW and 10th Street NW, and it tracked for 2 miles (3.2 km) along Maryland Avenue. It unroofed two homes, damaged the Botanic Garden, and damaged the roof of the Smithsonian Institution. There were no injuries or deaths.

A tornado, or possibly intense downbursts, struck the District during a heat wave on July 30, 1913. Substantial damage occurred to some buildings and trees were downed throughout the city, including at the White House.

At around 3 p.m. on April 5, 1923, an F3 tornado touched down in the northern Rock Creek Park, moving northeast into Maryland. The tornado tracked for 11 miles (18 km). Twenty people were injured, seven homes were destroyed, and twelve other homes were damaged. There were no deaths.

On May 14, 1927, an F0 tornado produced minor damage near North Capitol Street and Rhode Island Avenue at 6:00 p.m. The funnel was a landspout, not associated with a severe thunderstorm, as no wind was reported outside of the damage area. A few trees were uprooted or damaged, with structural damage being limited to roof shingles and awnings, as well as a few tombstones knocked over. No one was injured, and there was only minor damage.

At 2:25 p.m. on November 17, 1927, an F2 tornado touched down southwest of Alexandria, Virginia. After damaging Alexandria, the tornado crossed the Potomac River and injured several people at the Anacostia Naval Air Station.

The tornado crossed the Anacostia River and continued through the Navy Yard. From there, the tornado continued northward up Eighth Street Southeast and then turned a bit to travel north on Fourteenth Street near Lincoln Park. The tornado continued through the neighborhood of Kingman Park where it demolished several homes.

The tornado also damaged several Maryland suburbs, including Hyattsville, Bladensburg, Benning, and Colmar Manor. The tornado traveled about 15 miles (24 km) in all, including about 3 miles (4.8 km) in the District of Columbia. One person died from being struck by lightning while crossing a bridge; 49 other people were injured and 150 homes were either damaged or destroyed in the District. Dozens of families were made homeless from the tornado.

The speed of the tornado's winds were estimated to be 125 miles per hour (201 km/h). Saint Cyprian Roman Catholic Church, located near Lincoln Park, sustained serious damage. An airplane hangar at Anacostia Naval Air Station was demolished along with the seven airplanes inside it. The tornado also tore the roof off of barracks at Anacostia Naval Air Station. Property losses were estimated to be $1,000,000.

On May 21, 1943, a waterspout formed over the Potomac River, moving on land near the Jefferson Memorial before dissipating without damaging any structures. Another funnel was also sighted, which may have touched down briefly near the National Naval Medical Center in nearby Bethesda, Maryland.

== Since modern recordkeeping began ==
At 1:22 p.m. on May 18, 1995 an F1 tornado uprooted dozens of trees and inflicted $50,000 in damage at the National Arboretum. There were no injuries.

On September 24, 2001, during a series of tornadoes in the Washington region, a weak tornado passed near the Pentagon, crossed the Potomac, and damaged some trees in D.C. before dissipating near the National Mall. Another funnel cloud passed over Union Station, but did not touch down as a tornado until it reached the College Park and Beltsville areas of Maryland. Two people died and 57 were injured.

A tornado classified as EF0 on the Enhanced Fujita scale touched down in southeastern D.C. on April 6, 2017, damaging trees on Joint Base Anacostia–Bolling.

On July 1, 2021, an EF1 tornado as wide as 125 yards (114 m) and with winds of up to 90 mph (145 km/h) formed in Arlington County's Waverly Hills community at 8:59 p.m. The tornado then traveled eastward through the County's Cherrydale and Lyon Village neighborhoods. Several homes lost siding and numerous trees were snapped and uprooted, with some downing power lines. A large tree limb struck a home, injuring and briefly trapping one person.

The tornado entered the District of Columbia when crossing the Potomac River near the Theodore Roosevelt Bridge. The tornado then continued eastward along the National Mall until dissipating at 9:05 p.m. near 16th Street NW and Constitution Avenue, south of The Ellipse and the White House. The tornado's winds uprooted trees and broke their trunks and branches on and near the Mall. Temporary fences erected for the Mall's upcoming July 4 Independence Day events were lifted, twisted and fell near the end of the tornado's path. Portable toilets brought in for the events also toppled over. Straight-line winds damaged trees near other landmarks, including the Lincoln Memorial and the District of Columbia War Memorial.

Only minutes later, at 9:08 p.m., an EF0 tornado with winds of up to 80 mph (129 km/h) and as wide as 125 yards (114 m) formed to the northeast near H Street NE. The tornado traveled 0.75 mi (1.2 km) southeast into D.C.'s Kingman Park neighborhood, downing several hardwood trees and snapping numerous tree limbs. A large tree limb fell on two cars before the tornado dissipated at 9:10 p.m.

== See also ==
- List of North American tornadoes and tornado outbreaks
- Lists of tornadoes and tornado outbreaks
- Timeline of Washington, D.C.
