= Tornado outbreak of September 24, 2001 =

Series of tornadoes in several east coast U.S. states and Washington, D.C.

Meteorological history
- Duration: September 24, 2001; 24 years ago

Tornado outbreak
- Tornadoes: 9
- Max. rating: F4 tornado

Overall effects
- Fatalities: 2
- Injuries: 57
- Damage: $105.157 million (2001 US$) $129.718 million (2010 US$)
- Areas affected: Eastern United States (primarily the Mid-Atlantic states)
- Part of the tornadoes of 2001

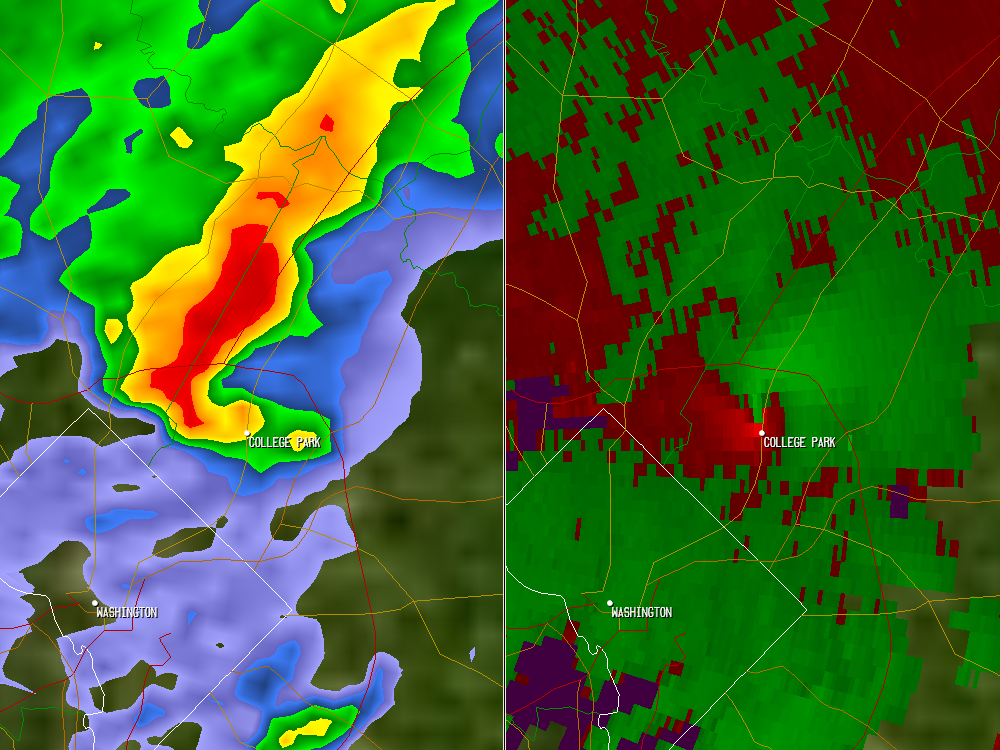
A Doppler weather radar image of the College Park tornado near its peak at 21:21 UTC

The tornado outbreak of September 24, 2001, was one of the worst tornado events to ever have directly affected the Baltimore–Washington metropolitan area in the United States. The outbreak occurred on Monday, September 24, 2001, and was responsible for two deaths and 57 injuries.

== Meteorological synopsis ==
On September 24, 2001, a trough in the mid- to upper-levels of the troposphere was tracking across the eastern U.S., accompanied by a cold front sweeping across the Appalachian Mountains. The Storm Prediction Center (SPC) predicted that atmospheric instability ahead of the front would be sufficient to support the development of thunderstorms during the day. Additionally, the anticipated storms were expected to emerge within an area of 45–55 knots (52–63 mph; 83–102 km/h) wind shear, suggesting that development of supercells was possible; these environmental characteristics were also similar to other severe weather events in the Mid-Atlantic. Considering these factors, the SPC assessed a slight risk of severe weather for parts of the Mid-Atlantic states on September 24. By 12:00 UTC (8:00 a.m. EDT), moisture had moved northwards ahead of the approaching cold front across the East Coast, with dew points exceeding 70 °F (21 °C) as far north as Maryland. Towards the late morning, a small low-pressure area emerged over western North Carolina, producing a small area of higher wind shear and resulting in a locally enhanced threat for severe weather along its trajectory towards the northeast. Weather radar detected weak rotation within thunderstorms forming over central North Carolina between 16:30–17:00 UTC. In response to the development of these storms and the favorable conditions afforded by the approaching low-pressure area, the SPC issued a tornado watch for parts of Maryland, Virginia, West Virginia, and the District of Columbia at 17:19 UTC. A thunderstorm formed near Charlottesville, Virginia, following the watch's issuance, while another thunderstorm formed southwest of Fredericksburg, Virginia, around 19:00 UTC. These two storms became supercell thunderstorms as they tracked northeast along with the low-pressure area, producing several tornadoes including an F4 tornado in Culpeper County, Virginia, and an F3 tornado that moved across College Park, Maryland.

== Component storms ==
The first tornado of the outbreak was also the strongest – an F4 (see Fujita scale) tornado that left a 10-mile-long damage path through rural Culpeper and Fauquier Counties in Virginia. Weak (F1) tornadoes east of Warrenton, and just west of Dulles International Airport soon followed.

A second supercell to the southeast spawned the family of tornadoes that moved through Washington. A first tornado (F0) was confirmed in the Quantico, and nearby Prince William Forest Park areas; this was soon followed by an F1 tornado that left a 15-mile-long path parallel to I-95 and I-395 through Franconia, western Alexandria, and southeastern Arlington. This tornado dissipated near the west end of the National Mall in Washington, D.C., and was followed by many reports of funnel clouds. The storm affected workers at the Pentagon who were mending the damage from the September 11 terrorist attacks.

The same storm soon produced a powerful, multiple-vortex F3 tornado in College Park, Maryland. This storm moved at peak intensity through the University of Maryland, College Park campus, and then moved parallel to I-95 through the Beltsville, Maryland, area, where the tornado caused extensive damage to greenhouses and other facilities of the USDA Beltsville Agricultural Research Center. The storm continued on to Laurel, Maryland, where F3 damage was also noted. The damage path from this storm was measured at 17.5 miles in length, and this tornado caused two deaths and 55 injuries, along with $101 million in property damage.

The two deaths at College Park were Colleen and Erin Marlatt, who died when their car was picked up by the tornado near the Easton Hall dormitory and thrown into a tree in a parking area.

== Confirmed tornadoes ==
Confirmed tornadoes by Fujita rating
FU	F0	F1	F2	F3	F4	F5	Total
0	3	3	1	1	1	0	9

List of reported tornadoes – September 24, 2001
F#	Location	County	Coord.	Time (UTC)	Path length	Damage
Virginia and Washington, D.C.
F4	Rixeyville to NE of Waterloo	Culpeper, Fauquier	38°09′N 78°13′W	1903	10 miles (16 km)	Tornado touched down in Rixeyville, blowing a tree onto a house. The tornado rapidly intensified into an F4 outside of town, flattening a well built three-story brick house. Debris from this house was found half a mile away. The tornado weakened to an F2 as it struck Jeffersonton, where extensive tree damage occurred and 4 churches were damaged. Four trailers were damaged and three others were destroyed in a trailer park as well. Continuing northeast of Jeffersonton, the tornado damaged the porch and roof of a house, damaged the sunroom of another house, and destroyed a garage. The roof was torn off of a barn before the tornado dissipated.
F1	W of Gordonsville	Orange	38°34′N 77°59′W	1935	0.2 miles (0.32 km)	Several trees were downed.
F1	NW of The Plains	Fauquier	38°51′N 77°47′W	1949	6 miles (9.7 km)	A porch was ripped off of a house and deposited 50 feet away. Pieces of lumber from the house were hurled into nearby vehicles. Two other houses were damaged as well, and a small poolhouse was destroyed. Extensive tree and power line damage occurred as well.
F0	Garrisonville area	Stafford, Prince William	38°29′N 77°25′W	2010	12 miles (19 km)	Trees were downed and a house sustained damage to its siding.
F1	Franconia to Washington, D.C.	Fairfax, Alexandria, Arlington, District of Columbia	38°44′N 77°11′W	2044	11 miles (18 km)	Tornado began in Virginia, damaging trees, power lines, and roofs in suburban areas. The tornado crossed into Washington, D.C., where it passed the Jefferson Memorial and crossed the Tidal Basin, snapping tree branches. It was seen passing just south of the Washington Monument, headed for the Smithsonian buildings and the Capitol. Tree branches were snapped and swirling debris was observed in that area before the tornado dissipated.
Maryland
F3	Chillum to Savage	Prince George's, Howard	38°56′N 76°59′W	2119	17.5 miles (28.2 km)	2 deaths – Multiple vortex tornado moved through several DC suburbs. Major damage occurred in and around College Park, Beltsville, and Laurel. The University of Maryland sustained major damage, where 10 trailer classrooms were torn apart and one was thrown 200 yards. Many trees were snapped and uprooted on campus, and vehicles were thrown and flipped. A car carrying two young female students was hurled several hundred yards and over a high-rise 8-story dormitory building, resulting in two fatalities. Other buildings on campus sustained damage to roofs, windows, and trim. The U.S. Dept. of Agriculture's Research Center sustained $41 million in damage. 861 homes, 560 vehicles, and 23 businesses were damaged or destroyed in Prince George's County alone. Light debris was carried up to 60 miles away. Caused a total of $73 million in damage and injured 50 people.
Pennsylvania
F2	Parkville	York	39°44′N 76°59′W	2333	5 miles (8.0 km)	8 homes had their roofs torn off, and several others sustained lesser damage. Trees were downed, 38 cars were damaged at a dealership, and roof damage occurred at a middle school and an administration building. A store complex sustained significant structural damage.
New York
F0	W of Fabius	Onondaga	unknown	unknown	.5 miles (0.80 km)	Several trees were downed and a shed was destroyed.
North Carolina
F0	N Aulander	Bertie	unknown	unknown	1 mile (1.6 km)	Two homes and multiple trees were damaged.

== See also ==
- Weather of 2001
- List of North American tornadoes and tornado outbreaks
- List of F4, EF4, and IF4 tornadoes
  - List of F4 and EF4 tornadoes (2000–2009)
- List of tornadoes in Washington, D.C.
