= 2001 California wildfires =

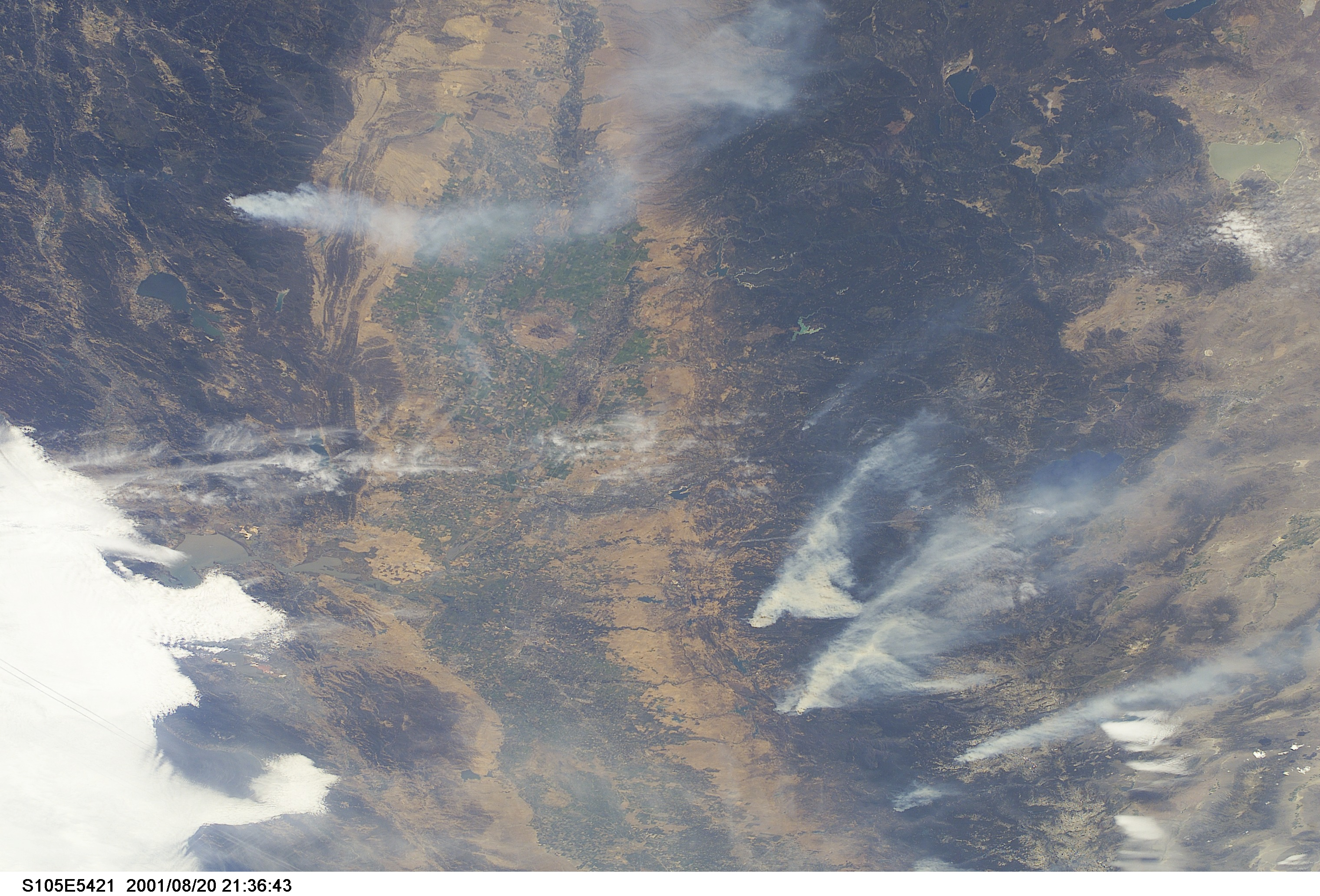
1 / Trough Fire; 2 / Leonard Fire	3 / Creek Fire; 4 / Hoover Complex Fire
Several fires burn on either side of California's Central Valley in a photograph taken from the Space Shuttle on August 20, 2001

Statistics
- Total fires: 9,317
- Total area: 377,340 acres 152,700 ha

Impacts
- Deaths: 2+
- Structures lost: 389+
- Cost: US$196 million ($109m in suppression costs and $87.3m in damages, per Cal Fire estimates)

According to California Department of Forestry and Fire Protection (Cal Fire) statistics, 9,317 wildfires burned a total of 377,340 acres (152,700 hectares) in the US state of California in 2001.

The largest wildfire of the year in California was the Observation Fire in Lassen County, which burned 67,700 acres, and the most destructive was the Poe Fire in Butte County, which burned 133 structures. Cal Fire wildfire suppression costs for fires that burned within the agency's jurisdiction amounted to US$109 million. Damages for the same amounted to $87.3 million, with a total of 389 structures lost. At least two fatalities occurred, both of them on the Bell Fire in San Diego County.

== Background ==
The timing of "fire season" in California is variable, depending on the amount of prior winter and spring precipitation, the frequency and severity of weather such as heat waves and wind events, and moisture content in vegetation. Northern California typically sees wildfire activity between late spring and early fall, peaking in the summer with hotter and drier conditions. Occasional cold frontal passages can bring wind and lightning. The timing of fire season in Southern California is similar, peaking between late spring and fall. The severity and duration of peak activity in either part of the state is modulated in part by weather events: downslope/offshore wind events can lead to critical fire weather, while onshore flow and Pacific weather systems can bring conditions that hamper wildfire growth.

== Narrative ==
An unusually warm, dry, and windy May prompted Cal Fire to declare May 22 the beginning of fire season throughout the state, the point in the year at which the agency hires seasonal staff to be at the ready round-the-clock in California forest districts. The pattern continued through June, with fires active weeks in advance of the 'usual' beginning of fire season.

The National Interagency Fire Center declared that the country had reached National Preparedness Level 5 (the point at which incidents across the country had the "potential to exhaust all agency fire resources") on August 15, 2001, with the bulk of the fires in California Oregon, and Nevada.

Cal Fire firefighting aircraft were temporarily grounded on September 11 by the ground stop order issued nationwide by the Federal Aviation Administration (FAA) in response to the deadly September 11 attacks in New York, Washington D.C., and Pennsylvania. The National Interagency Fire Center (NIFC) eventually instructed firefighting agencies to apply for exemptions as needed, and the restriction (which began at about 10:00 a.m.) was lifted after about three hours, when the FAA granted Cal Fire's request for exemption. The restriction affected aircraft on the Poe Fire in Butte County, among others.

All Cal Fire units were declared "off season" by December 3.

== List of wildfires ==
The following is a list of fires that burned more than 1,000 acres (400 hectares), produced significant structural damage or casualties, or were otherwise notable. It is excerpted from Cal Fire's 2001 list of large (≥ 300 acres) fires, and may not be complete or reflect the most recent information.

Name	County	Acres	Start date	Containment date (Note: Containment means that fire crews have established and secured control lines around the fire's perimeter. These lines are artificial barriers, like trenches or cleared vegetation, designed to stop the fire's spread, or natural barriers like rivers. Containment reflects progress in managing the fire but does not necessarily mean the fire is starved of fuel, under control, or put out.)	Notes	Ref
Viejas	San Diego	10,353	January 3, 2001	January 8, 2001	Caused by smoking; destroyed 16 structures, damaged 13	
Jones	Siskiyou	1,440	May 9, 2001	May 14, 2001	Caused by debris	
Devil	Lassen	4,400	May 27, 2001	June 1, 2001	Caused by equipment use	
165	Merced	1,500	June 13, 2001	June 13, 2001	Cause undetermined	
Jackson	Amador	2,240	June 13, 2001	June 13, 2001	Caused by welding; destroyed 15 structures, damaged 1	
SNF-562	Merced	1,200	June 13, 2001	June 13, 2001		
Hemlock	San Bernardino	1,074	June 14, 2001	June 20, 2001	Caused by an escaped burn	
Pacheco	Merced	1,550	June 16, 2001	June 17, 2001	Caused by a vehicle	
Martis	Nevada	14,500	June 17, 2001	July 1, 2001	Caused by a campfire	
Watkins	Riverside	1,407	June 23, 2001	June 24, 2001	Caused by arson	
McLaughlin	Inyo	2,900	July 2, 2001	July 5, 2001	Caused by lightning	
Hoover Complex	Mariposa	8,007	July 13, 2001		Caused by lightning; was allowed to burn in Yosemite National Park for ecological reasons	
Reche	Riverside	1,798	July 22, 2001	July 23, 2001	Caused by a vehicle	
Stream	Lassen	3,560	July 26, 2001	July 26, 2001	Caused by lightning	
Trough	Lake, Glenn, Colusa	24,970	August 8, 2001	August 20, 2001	Cause undetermined; destroyed 30 structures	
Cowhead	Modoc	1,670	August 8, 2001	August 9, 2001	Caused by lightning	
Modoc Complex	Modoc	5,367	August 8, 2001	August 8, 2001	Caused by lightning	
Shaffer	Lassen	1,100	August 8, 2001	August 8, 2001	Caused by lightning	
Observation	Lassen	67,700	August 9, 2001	August 12, 2001	Caused by lightning	
Blue Complex	Modoc	37,950	August 9, 2001	August 10, 2001	Caused by lightning	
(Emigrant) Gap	Nevada, Placer	2,462	August 12, 2001	August 17, 2001	Caused by human activity	
Crater	Mono	5,800	August 12, 2001	August 15, 2001	Caused by lightning	
Buzz	Modoc	2,206	August 12, 2001	August 12, 2001	Caused by lightning	
Ponderosa	Placer	2,780	August 17, 2001	August 23, 2001	Caused by a vehicle	
Creek	Mariposa, Tuolumne	11,095	August 18, 2001	August 24, 2001	Caused by arson; destroyed 43 structures	
Leonard	Calaveras	5,167	August 19, 2001	August 25, 2001	Caused by equipment use; destroyed 22 structures	
Highway	Fresno	4,152	August 19, 2001	August 29, 2001	Caused by arson; destroyed 8 structures	
North Fork	Madera	2,930	August 20, 2001			
Star	El Dorado	16,761	August 25, 2001	September 22, 2001		
Oregon	Trinity	1,680	August 28, 2001	August 31, 2001	Cause undetermined; destroyed 33 structures and caused evacuations in the town of Weaverville	
Hyampon	Trinity	1,065	August 31, 2001	September 5, 2001	Cause undetermined	
Darby	Calaveras	14,280	September 5, 2001	September 24, 2001	Cause undetermined	
Poe	Butte	8,333	September 6, 2001	September 12, 2001	Caused by tree into PG&E power lines, destroyed 133 structures in the Yankee Hill area	
Happy Camp Complex	Siskiyou	8,500	September 14, 2001	October 10, 2001	Caused by lightning	
Stables	Los Angeles	6,544	October 12, 2001	October 15, 2001		
Highway 70	Butte	1,711	October 24, 2001	October 26, 2001	Caused by arson	
Bell	San Diego	1,204	December 8, 2001	December 11, 2001	Cause undetermined; 2 fatalities	

== See also ==
- List of California wildfires
