= Poe Fire =

2001 wildfire in Northern California

- Part of the 2001 California wildfires
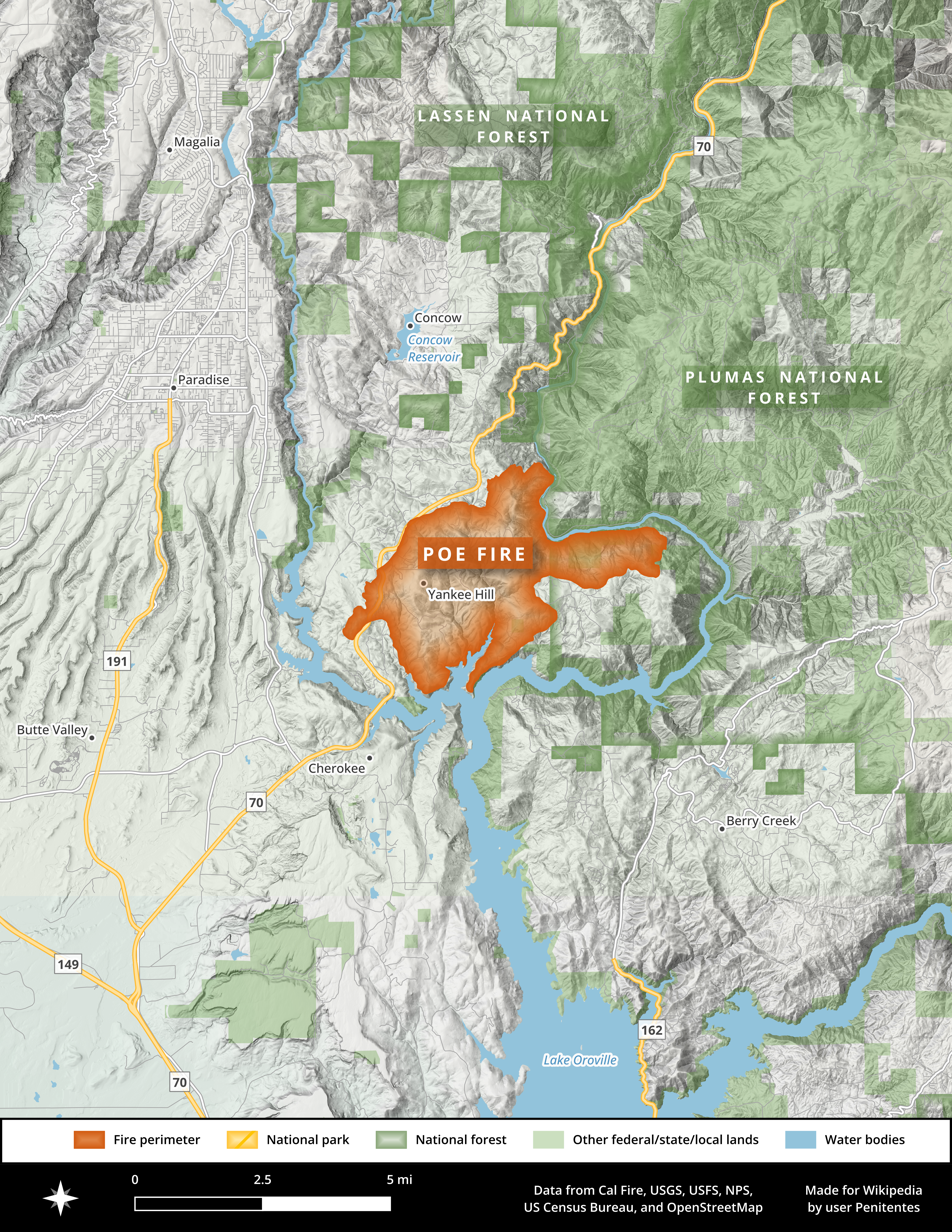
- The Poe Fire burned southeast of Paradise and north of Lake Oroville.
- Date: September 6 –; September 12, 2001; (7 days)
- Location: Butte County, Northern California, United States
- Coordinates: 39°42′13″N 121°31′20″W

Statistics
- Burned area: 8,333 acres (3,372 ha; 13 sq mi; 34 km^{2})

Impacts
- Deaths: 0
- Injuries: 20+
- Structures destroyed: 133+
- Cost: $11 million; (equivalent to about $18.6 million in 2024)

Ignition
- Cause: Dead tree falling into power lines

Map
- The Poe Fire burned in California's Butte County in the foothills of the northern Sierra Nevada.

The 2001 Poe Fire was a destructive wildfire in Butte County, Northern California. After igniting on September 6, the fire burned 8,333 acres (3,372 hectares) and destroyed at least 133 structures in the Big Bend and Yankee Hill areas north of Oroville before it was fully contained on September 12, 2001. It was the most destructive wildfire of the annual fire season in California.

The fire started when a tree fell on a Pacific Gas & Electric Company (PG&E) power line, and a lawsuit against PG&E joined by more than a hundred plaintiffs was settled for several million dollars.

== Background ==
On September 6, Butte County was under a red flag warning, a product issued by the National Weather Service for conditions supportive of dangerous wildfire spread. Forecasts on the first day of the fire called for relative humidity levels of 5 to 10 percent, and winds of 20 miles per hour (32 km/h).

== Progression ==
The Poe Fire broke out the morning of September 6, at around 8:20 a.m. PDT. Strong northeast winds felled a 100-foot (30 m)-tall ponderosa pine snag, which struck three power lines providing backup electricity for PG&E's Poe Dam powerhouse on the North Fork Feather River. The strong winds and multiple resulting spot fires quickly consolidated into a single blaze, which moved up the slope.

Fire crews responded to the scene by 8:28 a.m., but the up-slope winds pushed the fire to 500 acres (200 ha) by 11:30 a.m., burning structures on Windy Ridge Road and Big Bend Road. Aircraft, including six fixed-wing air tankers and two helicopters, began assisting firefighters by noon. By 8:00 p.m. the Poe Fire was 1,500 acres (610 ha) and 10 percent contained, but windy conditions with low humidity continued overnight and fueled rapid expansion of the fire. The Yankee Hill area was evacuated near midnight, and though firefighters were able to protect the majority of homes several dozen structures were still lost.

By 9:00 a.m. on September 7 the Poe Fire had burned 6,168 acres (2,496 ha). On its western edge, the fire jumped Highway 70 near Lunt Road, but firefighters were able to contain the slop-over. During the day conditions remained dire but the fire grew much less. By 7:00 p.m. on the 7th the Poe Fire was 6,580 acres (2,660 ha) and 20 percent contained, having destroyed more than two dozen homes as firefighters worked to stop flames from jumping Lake Oroville and threatening populated areas near Paradise.

On September 8 the fire remained 20 percent contained, and the number of firefighters on the incident increased as crews demobilized from the Darby Fire in Calaveras County. By the next afternoon the Poe Fire had reached 7,800 acres (3,200 ha) and 50 percent containment, with more than 1,500 firefighters working. The fire primarily moved east, working along the bottoms of the river canyons, and firefighters welcomed improved weather conditions that brought lower temperatures and winds with higher humidity. By the night of September 10 the fire was more than 8,000 acres (3,200 ha) and 80 percent contained, with peak firefighter staffing at 2,100. The last remaining section of uncontained fire was moving east, between Big Bend Road and the Feather River.

By September 11 the fire was 8,149 acres (3,298 ha) and 95 percent contained. Aircraft fighting the Poe Fire that day were temporarily prevented from flying because of the ground stop order issued nationwide in response to the September 11 attacks in New York, Washington, D.C., and Pennsylvania. The National Interagency Fire Center eventually instructed firefighting agencies to apply for exemptions through the Federal Aviation Administration (FAA) as needed, and at least one of the aircraft on the Poe Fire was equipped with a special transponder code that broadcast its "friendly" status. The restriction began at about 10:00 a.m. and was in force for about three hours, when the FAA granted Cal Fire's request for exemption. In the meantime, stunned firefighters kept abreast of events, including the deaths of hundreds of their colleagues in New York, via portable televisions and radios as well as a large-screen television brought into base camp.

The Poe Fire was declared 100 percent contained on September 12, though firefighters continued to quench hot spots and used controlled burns to burn off vegetation between the fire itself and its containment lines.

== Effects ==
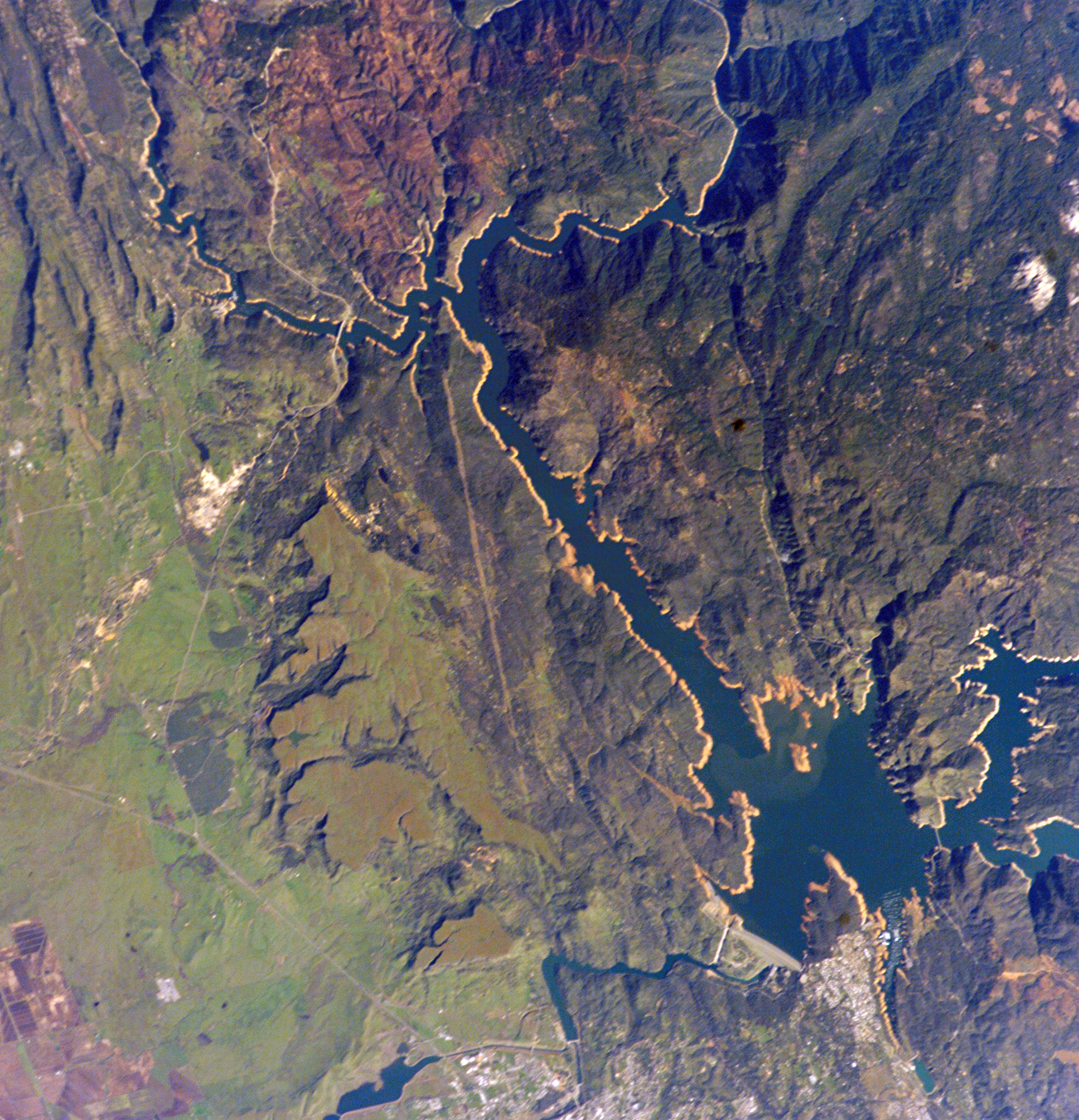
The Poe Fire is visible in this March 2002 photograph from the International Space Station as a brown scar above Lake Oroville.

The Poe Fire caused no fatalities, but at least 20 firefighters were injured. One firefighter was hospitalized with smoke inhalation and hypertension on September 6.

In addition to the evacuations of Big Bend and Yankee Hill, the fire forced the closure of a five-mile (8 km) section of Highway 70 between September 6 and 8.

=== Damage ===
Precise figures for the number of structures destroyed in the Poe Fire vary by source. Cal Fire records report that 133 structures were destroyed and three damaged in the Poe Fire. However, the Chico Enterprise-Record reported that the fire destroyed 170 structures, including 47 homes (as well as 155 vehicles), and The Mercury News reported in 2018 that the figure was 192 structures, including 40 homes. The Poe Fire also did roughly $500,000 in damage to road and highway infrastructure (such as safety devices and signage), including Highway 70. The total losses amounted to more than $6 million, on top of about $5 million in fire suppression costs. At the time, the Poe Fire was the most destructive fire in the history of Butte County.

Butte County's request for both gubernatorial and presidential disaster declarations was denied by the office of Governor Gray Davis, on the basis that not enough property damage had occurred to meet the Federal Emergency Management Agency or state Office of Emergency Services threshold. Congressional representative Wally Herger urged the governor to declare a disaster, and the Butte County board of supervisors appealed the decision. The Butte County Office of Emergency Services said that they lacked enough money to even remove debris from the fire, and that the fire had destroyed 43 wells and created a water shortage in the "financially distressed" county. Eventually, at the governor's request, the Small Business Administration declared Butte County a disaster area, making low-interest federal loans available to victims of the Poe Fire there. Butte County also waived all fees associated with reconstruction.

== Lawsuit ==
In April 2002, two local attorneys representing 87 plaintiffs sued PG&E for damages resulting from the Poe Fire, alleging that the company had failed to inspect and maintain the right-of-way for the power lines and remove the dead Ponderosa pine, violating the California Public Resources Code. One of the attorneys had previously extracted two settlements from PG&E over their power lines' roles in starting the 1986 Doe Ridge Mill Fire and the 1990 Campbell Complex fires.

Attorneys for the plaintiffs—which eventually numbered over a hundred, including Cal Fire and insurance companies—announced a settlement of $5.9 million on February 21, 2006. The announcement came just before the matter had been scheduled to go to trial. PG&E admitted no culpability for the fire through the settlement.

== See also ==
- Butte Fire (2015)
- Camp Fire (2018)
- Dixie Fire (2021)
