= Tornado outbreak of November 23–24, 2001 =

Weather event in the United States

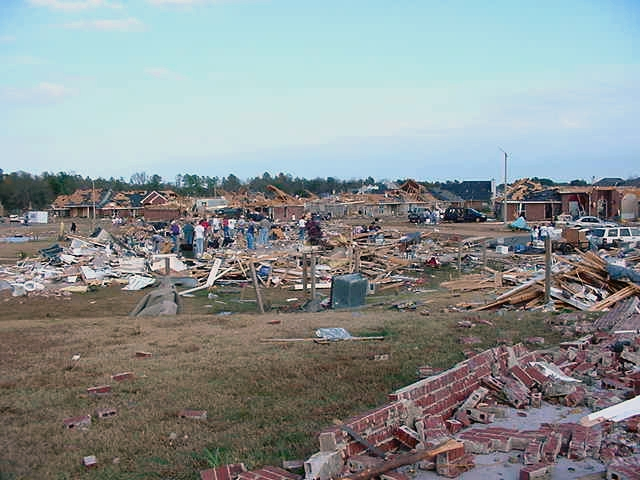
- F4 damage to a subdivision of Madison, Mississippi, on November 24, 2001 (courtesy of NWS Jackson, Mississippi)

Meteorological history
- Duration: November 23–24, 2001

Tornado outbreak
- Tornadoes: 68
- Max. rating: F4 tornado
- Duration: ~26 hours

Overall effects
- Casualties: 13 deaths, 219 injuries
- Damage: $53.3 million (2001 USD)
- Areas affected: Eastern United States (especially the Southeastern states)

The Tornado outbreak of November 23–24, 2001 was a large and intense late season tornado outbreak which affected portions of the southern United States from Arkansas to Alabama on November 23–24, 2001, with additional tornadoes recorded in Louisiana, Kentucky, Missouri, Indiana and Georgia. Recorded as one of the most intense November outbreaks ever across that area, tornadoes from the event killed at least 13 across three states including 4 in Alabama, four in Arkansas and five in Mississippi.

== Meteorological synopsis ==
A low-pressure system was situated, just after 5 AM on November 24, near Kansas City, Missouri. Its associated cold front traversed much of the outbreak-affected area with several supercells forming ahead of the front. Rich moist air from the Gulf of Mexico and cold air aloft and wind shear provided the ingredients from a significant severe weather outbreak.

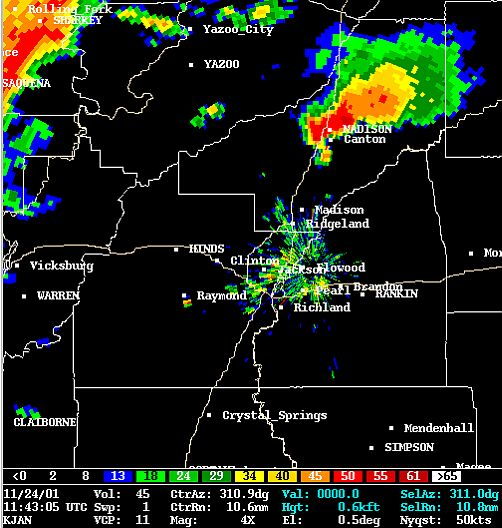
Radar shot of the Madison supercell just before 5:00 AM CDT (NWS Jackson)

Supercells formed late across much of Arkansas and Mississippi during the evening hours of November 23 up into the early morning hours of November 24 produced several tornadoes including two F4 Mississippi tornadoes across Washington and Bolivar Counties at around 2 AM and in Madison County near the city of Madison at around 5 AM. The second tornado killed at least 2 (including a newborn baby) and injured 21. Another tornado in Mississippi, an F2, struck Quitman, Panola and Tate Counties just after 3 AM and killed at least three. In Arkansas, four people were killed by two separate tornadoes including three in Ashley County from a single tornado that moved from Louisiana.

Outbreak death toll
State	Total	County	County total
Alabama	4	Cherokee	2
Alabama	4	Lamar	2
Arkansas	4	Ashley	3
Arkansas	4	Johnson	1
Mississippi	5	Madison	2
Mississippi	5	Panola	1
Mississippi	5	Quitman	2
Totals	13		
All deaths were tornado-related

Activity shifted into Alabama during midday on November 24 where numerous supercells traveled across the Birmingham coverage area. There were at least, according to the National Weather Service in Birmingham, 13 supercells that produced tornadoes including an F4 tornado that traversed Blount and Etowah Counties just after 1:00 PM. Activity ceased just after midnight with the final tornadoes touching down across Alabama in Dale County. In Alabama alone, 4 people were killed by two separate tornadoes including 2 from an F3 that moved from Pickens County northeastward and north of Birmingham and Tuscaloosa towards Walker County. Another tornado killed 2 in Cherokee County in the northeastern part of the state.

== Confirmed tornadoes ==
Confirmed tornadoes by Fujita rating
FU	F0	F1	F2	F3	F4	F5	Total
0	22	22	18	3	3	0	68

=== November 23 event ===
F#	Location	County	Time (UTC)	Path length	Damage
Arkansas
F1	SW of Greenwood	Franklin, Logan	0125	8 miles (12.8 km)	Several barns and one house was damaged.
F2	NW of Altus to N of Salus	Franklin, Johnson, Newton	0136	31.5 miles (50.4 km)	1 death – Fatality was inside a mobile home and 4 others were injured. Several homes were damaged, some of them heavily. Several mobile homes, barns, outbuildings, six chicken houses and two turkey houses were destroyed. Numerous chickens that were inside chicken houses were killed. Numerous trees at a national forest were downed, and several vehicles were damaged as well.
F1	NE of Altus	Franklin, Johnson	0140	8.8 miles (14.1 km)	Damage to barns, homes and power lines.
F2	NW of Limestone	Newton	0224	18.5 miles (29.6 km)	Major damage to an Inn and a restaurant. Several homes were damaged and outbuildings were destroyed.
F1	SW of Pyatt	Boone, Marion	0303	8 miles (12.8 km)	Three barns, a house and garage were heavily or destroyed with several other homes receiving minor damage.
F2	SW of Searcy	White	0725	5.5 miles (8.8 km)	A small house and trailer was destroyed, and one house was shifted from its foundation. Dozens of other structures were damaged. 3 people were injured.
F1	SW of Fairview	Chicot	0731	1 miles (1.6 km)	Four houses and a mobile home were damaged.
Missouri
F2	N of Exeter	Barry	0228	4 miles (6.4 km)	Significant damage to several residences. Two storage buildings were swept from their foundations. Damage also to chicken houses and grain bins and outbuildings were destroyed. 3 people were injured.
F1	NE of Opal	Lawrence	0320	2 miles (3.2 km)	Roof damage to a firehouse and several homes. A steeple from a church was also toppled. Poultry houses were destroyed as well.
Louisiana
F1	W of Eros	Jackson, Ouachita	0539	9 miles (14.4 km)	Damage to a carport, a chicken house, and a mobile home.
F3	NE of Bastrop to NE of Parkdale, Arkansas	Morehouse, Ashley (AR)	0640	30 miles (48 km)	3 deaths – In Arkansas, a tractor shed, a church, 14 mobile homes and homes were destroyed and five other homes were severely damaged in Wilmot, where three people were killed. In Louisiana, there was extensive damage to a potato plant, farm buildings and one house.
F1	S of Faircloth	Grant	0643	11.5 miles (18.4 km)	Damage was limited to trees.
F0	SE of Curry	Winn	0714	2.9 miles (4.6 km)	Damage to trees and street signs.
F1	W of Grayson	Caldwell	0735	5 miles (8 km)	Damage was limited to trees.
Mississippi
F4	SW of Winterville to S of Mound Bayou	Washington, Bolivar	0755	30.3 miles (48.5 km)	Worst damage was in the Winterville area. A total of 48 people were injured by the storm. 16 homes, seven mobile homes, six businesses and a power substation were destroyed. A few of the destroyed homes were swept away. Numerous other structures including homes and mobile homes sustained minor to severe damage.

=== November 24 event ===
F#	Location	County	Time (UTC)	Path length	Damage
Louisiana
F2	S of Big Bend	Avoyelles	0805	1 miles (1.6 km)	One mobile home was destroyed, with its three occupants being injured.
F0	NW of Afton	Madison	1210	0.5 miles (0.8 km)	A shed was blown away.
Mississippi
F1	SW of Baltzer	Sunflower, Coahoma	0842	6 miles (9.6 km)	One mobile home was destroyed, and several homes had major damage or were destroyed.
F2	W of Walnut to SE of Arkabutla	Quitman, Panola, Tate	0910	43.5 miles (69.6 km)	3 deaths – 135 homes, a cotton plant, a mobile home, a church and other structures were damaged or destroyed. Deaths were inside destroyed structures including one girl who was inside a mobile home. 33 others were injured.
F2	E of Lewisburg	DeSoto	1010	6 miles (9.6 km)	19 homes were destroyed and 119 were others damaged. 9 people were injured
F3	Isola area	Humphreys	1015	6 miles (9.6 km)	23 homes, 10 businesses and two churches were severely damaged or destroyed with minor damage to other structures. Several grain silos and a farm headquarters were also destroyed. There were 5 minor injuries.
F0	SE of Bolton	Hinds	1051	0.2 miles (0.32 km)	Damage was limited to trees.
F0	SE of Pocahontas	Hinds	1118	0.3 miles (0.5 km)	Brief touchdown with no damage.
F4	SW of Madison to S of Canton	Madison	1125	11.5 miles (18.4 km)	2 deaths – 84 homes and 10 mobile homes were severely damaged or destroyed with minor damage to 67 other homes and three mobile homes. One of the fatalities was a baby, who died shortly after birth following the tornado. The mother had been critically injured. Worst of the damage occurred in the Fairfield subdivision of the Madison area, where homes were leveled or swept away.
F1	S of Bolatusha	Leake	1225	0.2 miles (0.32 km)	Damage was limited to trees.
F0	SW of Starkville	Oktibbeha	1530	0.1 miles (0.16 km)	Brief touchdown with no damage.
F1	NW of Aubrey	Noxubee	1610	8 miles (12.8 km)	11 barns, 3 homes and a grain silo were damaged, while three sheds and a small airplane hangar were destroyed.
F0	NE of Middleton	Clarke	1715	0.5 miles (0.8 km)	Minor damage occurred to one home.
F0	SW of Stonewall	Clarke	1802	0.3 miles (0.5 km)	Damage to trees and power lines.
Kentucky
F2	W of Murray	Calloway	1247	11.5 miles (18.4 km)	45 to 50 structures were damaged or destroyed including homes, barns, and mobile homes. 4 people were injured.
Alabama
F3	SE of Millport to NE of Howard	Pickens, Lamar, Fayette, Walker	1655	38.9 miles (62.2 km)	2 deaths – Worst damage occurred in the community of Kennedy. Numerous structures were damaged or destroyed. Two occupants of a mobile home in Lamar County were killed and another person was injured.
F0	NE of Moundville	Hale	1702	0.2 miles (0.32 km)	Minor damage occurred to a nursery and mobile home.
F2	Haleyville area	Marion, Winston	1721	1.9 miles (3 km)	Downtown Haleyville was severely damaged by this tornado. Several buildings including a shopping mall were badly damaged. There were 13 injuries.
F1	SW of Samantha	Tuscaloosa	1739	2 miles (3.2 km)	A few outbuildings were destroyed and one home sustained roof damage.
F0	S of Butler	Choctaw	1745	0.1 miles (0.16 km)	Damage to trees and power lines.
F2	SW of Caddo to Trinity	Lawrence, Morgan	1810	4.9 miles (7.9 km)	25 homes sustained varying degrees of damage, including three homes that were totally destroyed. One mobile home was demolished, and two homes received significant damage. Additional damage was reported to several businesses and one church. Numerous trees were snapped or uprooted and numerous outbuildings were destroyed. Two people were injured in Caddo.
F0	Cedarville area	Hale	1834	2.9 miles (4.6 km)	A few structures were damaged.
F0	S of Gilbertown	Choctaw	1835	0.1 miles (0.16 km)	Damage occurred to a few trees.
F0	NW of Bucksville	Tuscaloosa	1837	0.2 miles (0.32 km)	Brief touchdown with no damage.
F0	W of Rembert	Marengo	1856	0.6 miles (1 km)	Trees and power lines were blown down.
F1	W of Vinemount	Cullman	1859	2.1 miles (3.4 km)	3 chicken barns were damaged or destroyed and a frame garage collapsed.
F0	SE of Toxey	Choctaw	1900	0.1 miles (0.16 km)	Minor roof damage to some structures.
F0	SW of Good Hope	Cullman	1902	0.2 miles (0.32 km)	A few trees were blown down.
F4	SE of Oneonta to SE of Altoona	Blount, Etowah	1919	10.1 miles (16.2 km)	22 people were injured. Numerous homes destroyed, some of which were completely leveled. Several heavy vehicles or equipment such as bulldozers, dump trunks and storage containers were rolled over or moved a certain distance. Several other homes, one church, one pole-barn building and trailers were damaged or destroyed.
F2	NE of Trussville to E of Springville	Jefferson, St. Clair	1931	13.4 miles (21.4 km)	Damage to a sports complex, several homes and mobile homes. One person was injured.
F2	SE of Morgan City	Marshall	1941	2 miles (3.2 km)	10 to 15 mobile homes, a hangar, two hunting cabins and several outbuildings and barns were destroyed while a few homes also sustained damage. 7 people were injured
F2	W of New Hope	Madison	1950	2.6 miles (4.2 km)	Several mobile homes were demolished while several businesses and 21 homes were damaged or destroyed.
F2	SW of Pine Ridge	DeKalb	2025	7.1 miles (11.4 km)	Several chickens barns, and a cinder-block building were damaged, and a trailer home was destroyed.
F2	NE of Sand Rock	Cherokee	2101	8.2 miles (13.1 km)	2 deaths – The fatalities were from a demolished mobile home. Several other structures were damaged and 4 people were injured.
F2	N of Pell City	St. Clair	2110	4.5 miles (7.2 km)	The tornado did damage to an EMA/911 office building as well as its communication tower. Several structures in downtown Pell City and its industrial park suffered minor to moderate damage. A few homes also sustained damaged and two people were injured.
F2	Sylacauga area	Talladega	2142	3.1 miles (5 km)	40 to 50 homes were damaged while 10 mobile homes and several outbuildings and sheds were destroyed. 15 people were injured.
F1	SW of Marbury	Autauga	2154	9.8 miles (15.7 km)	A trailer home, two trailers, and a shed were destroyed. Several homes and mobile homes were damaged as well.
F2	SE of Sycamore	Talladega	2159	9.1 miles (14.6 km)	Several homes were damaged while 6 mobile homes, several outbuildings, and barns were destroyed.
F1	SW of Jacksonville	Calhoun	2203	7.7 miles (12.3 km)	10 to 20 homes were damaged while several barns and outbuildings were destroyed. 5 people were injured due to flying debris.
F0	W of Evergreen	Conecuh	2242	0.1 miles (0.16 km)	Damage to trees and power lines.
F0	SW of Georgiana	Butler	2308	3 miles (4.8 km)	Minor structural damage to a church.
F1	NE of Barfield	Clay, Randolph	2310	6.1 miles (9.8 km)	A chapel and several barns suffered extensive damage. with some barns being destroyed.
F1	S of McKenzie	Butler	2342	6 miles (9.6 km)	A mobile home was destroyed, with its three occupants being injured.
F0	SW of Garland	Butler	0030	0.1 miles (0.16 km)	Damage was limited to trees.
F0	Brewton area	Escambia	0110	0.1 miles (0.16 km)	Minor roof damage to a few homes.
F0	NW of River Falls	Covington	0128	0.1 miles (0.16 km)	Damage to trees and power lines.
F0	E of Rose Hill	Covington	0230	0.2 miles (0.32 km)	Damage was limited to trees.
F0	SW of Ansley	Pike	0242	0.2 miles (0.32 km)	Damage limited to trees.
F1	N of Tarentum	Pike	0327	11.8 miles (18.9 km)	Moderate to significant roof damage to a few homes.
F1	Daleville area	Dale	0612	2 miles (3.2 km)	Two restaurants and two industrial buildings were destroyed. An Inn and Lounge, maintenance buildings, one aircraft, 25 businesses, a church, a gas station, two supermarkets, a bank and several homes were damaged. 25 people inside the Lounge were injured.
F1	S of Ewell	Dale	0630	0.1 miles (0.16 km)	A double mobile home was destroyed, injuring its two occupants.
Georgia
F1	E of Head River	Dade	2106	1.5 miles (2.4 km)	A concrete block garage and a barn were destroyed, with other structures sustaining some damage.
Indiana
F1	SE of Fenns to Gwynneville	Shelby	0108	16 miles (25.6 km)	Damage to 23 homes, an auto shop, and 7 other businesses.

== See also ==
- List of North American tornadoes and tornado outbreaks
- Tornadoes of 2001
