= Tornado outbreak of April 10–11, 2001 =

Weather event in the United States

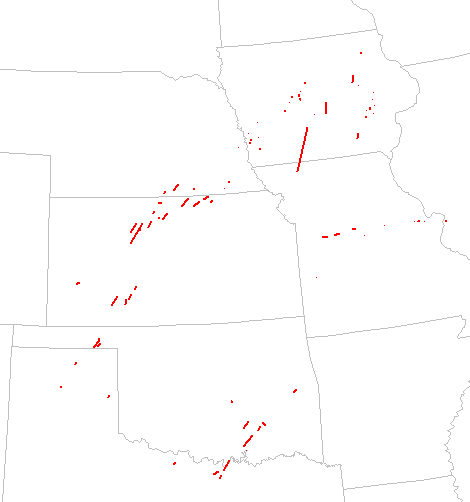
- Paths of the individual tornadoes of this outbreak

Meteorological history
- Duration: April 10–11, 2001

Tornado outbreak
- Tornadoes: 79
- Max. rating: F3 tornado
- Duration: 25 hours, 22 minutes

Overall effects
- Casualties: 4 deaths, 18 injuries
- Damage: $23.75 million ($43.2 million in 2025 dollars) (+$2 billion (2001 USD ($3636534486) in 2025 via hail)
- Areas affected: Central Great Plains

The tornado outbreak of April 10–11, 2001, was a large tornado outbreak which affected the central Great Plains on April 10–11, 2001. During the two-day outbreak, it produced a total of 79 tornadoes across eight states including Kansas, Missouri, Oklahoma, Texas, Nebraska, Iowa, Illinois and Michigan. Four people were killed, 18 injured, and more than $23 million in damage was reported. The fatalities were reported in Oklahoma, Iowa and Missouri including two from a single tornado in Wapello County, Iowa.

The strongest tornado tracked for over 75 miles from northern Missouri to near Des Moines, Iowa causing extensive damage to several structures. In addition to that storm, a supercell on April 10 produced the largest and most damaging hail swath in history; as well as ten tornadoes.

== Tornado event ==
The first tornadoes developed during the late afternoon across west-central Missouri and mostly tracked near Interstate 70 eastward towards the St. Louis Metropolitan Area during the first half of the evening before weakening in Illinois. In addition to the damaging hail (see Tri-State hailstorm section for details), several weak tornadoes were confirmed. One tornado, however, killed a person inside a mobile home near the Fulton area in Callaway County

A new wave of tornadoes touched down further to the west in Nebraska, Kansas, Oklahoma and Texas during the late evening and overnight hours. One person was killed in Coal County, Oklahoma by an F2 tornado that threw the mobile home for about 200 yards before being destroyed. Several other significant tornadoes also caused extensive damage across southern Oklahoma, northern Texas and both the Oklahoma and Texas Panhandles until activity slowed down after dawn on April 11.

A final wave of tornadoes developed during the late morning and the afternoon hours mostly across Iowa where some of the strongest tornadoes took place. One tornado during the late morning carved a path of about 75 miles from northeast of Kansas City, Missouri to just southwest of Des Moines, Iowa. Several homes were destroyed or heavily damaged (earning an F3 rating) although there were no fatalities with this storm Later during the day, an F2 tornado killed two people in Agency, Iowa (Wapello County) and destroyed or heavily damaged dozens of structures including a Lodge. The outbreak ended across western Michigan during the late afternoon.

== Tornado table ==
Confirmed tornadoes by Fujita rating
| FU | F0 | F1 | F2 | F3 | F4 | F5 | Total |
|---|---|---|---|---|---|---|---|
| 0 | 31 | 36 | 11 | 1 | 0 | 0 | 79 |

== Confirmed tornadoes ==
=== April 10 event ===
| F# | Location | County | Time (UTC) | Path length | Damage |
|---|---|---|---|---|---|
Missouri
| F1 | N of Warrensburg | Johnson | 2220 | 8 miles (12.8 km) | 100 homes and businesses were damaged. |
| F1 | N of La Monte | Pettis | 2245 | 10 miles (16 km) | Two barns, a chicken coop, and vacant house were destroyed. |
| F1 | SE of Pilot Grove | Cooper | 2311 | 5 miles (8 km) | Two homes had roof damage, and trees and power lines were downed. |
| F0 | SW of Kliever | Moniteau | 2347 | 0.1 miles (0.16 km) | Brief touchdown with no damage. |
| F1 | Fulton area | Callaway | 0020 | 3 miles (4.8 km) | 1 death – A mobile home and outbuildings were destroyed and a school bus was overturned. A warehouse complex sustained roof damage. The fatality and two injuries were inside the mobile home |
| F0 | NW of Wright City | Warren | 0120 | 0.1 miles (0.16 km) | A mobile home was overturned. |
| F0 | NE of Foristell | St. Charles | 0130 | 4 miles (6.4 km) | 3 homes, an automotive repair shop and a restaurant had damage and a garage was destroyed. A tractor-trailer was blown into railroad tracks. |
| F1 | O'Fallon area | St. Charles | 0145 | 1 miles (1.6 km) | 2 buildings were destroyed and 22 homes, apartments and businesses were damaged. |
Illinois
| F1 | Granite City area | Madison | 0235 | 2 miles (3.2 km) | Two buildings and one house were destroyed while a golf course, 4 buildings, 23 houses and businesses and numerous cars were damaged. One person was injured by flying glass. |
Kansas
| F1 | W of Deerfield | Kearny | 0242 | 5.1 miles (8.2 km) | Two pivot sprinklers, a shed and 30 homes were damaged. |
| F2 | W of Ellis to SE of Stockton | Trego, Ellis, Rooks | 0408 | 40.1 miles (64.2 km) | Several outbuildings, trailers, homes and 13 farms were damaged. Semi-trailers were overturned injuring several people |
| F1 | SW of Zurich to SE of Webster | Rooks | 0435 | 14 miles (22.4 km) | Several outbuildings, trees, and farm equipment were damaged. |
| F0 | Plainville area | Rooks | 0445 | 3 miles (4.8 km) | Homes in production at a manufacturing plant were damaged. |
| F1 | S of Alton | Osborne | 0505 | 9 miles (14.4 km) | Trees and outbuildings were damaged. |
| F2 | NW of Minneola to S of Dodge City | Ford | 0510 | 17.3 miles (27.7 km) | A mobile home was completely demolished. Another trailer nearby received moderate damage. Two pivot sprinklers were destroyed and there was other scattered minor damage along the path of the tornado. |
| F1 | W of Gaylord | Smith | 0524 | 4 miles (6.4 km) | Caused damage to trees and power poles. |
| F1 | N of Osborne | Osborne | 0525 | 2 miles (3.2 km) | Caused damage to oil tanks and concrete blocks at an abandoned gas station |
| F1 | Downs area | Osborne, Smith, Jewell | 0525 | 13 miles (20.8 km) | One home, farm machinery, and several outbuildings were damaged. |
| F2 | S of Ford | Ford | 0539 | 10 miles (16 km) | Eight pivot sprinklers, a silo, and a barn were destroyed. |
| F1 | NE of Ford | Ford | 0548 | 9.6 miles (15.4 km) | Three pivot sprinklers and a grain bin were destroyed. |
| F0 | SW of Cora | Smith | 0549 | 3.5 miles (5.6 km) | Caused damage to trees and power poles. |
| F0 | SW of Kinsley | Edwards | 0557 | 7.4 miles (11.8 km) | Caused roof damage to one house. |
| F1 | S of Formoso to E of Republic | Jewell, Republic | 0614 | 17.5 miles (28 km) | Damage to trees, power lines, farm outbuildings and other buildings. |
| F1 | W of Cuba | Republic | 0630 | 10 miles (16 km) | Unknown intermittent damage occurred. |
| F0 | NW of Haddam | Washington | 0655 | 6 miles (9.6 km) | Trees and outbuildings were damaged. |
| F1 | NW of Washington | Washington | 0705 | 4 miles (6.4 km) | Outbuildings, an antenna, and power poles were damaged. |
Texas
| F1 | SE of Fritch | Carson, Hutchinson | 0322 | 1.5 miles (2.4 km) | Damage to homes, mobile homes, farm equipment, and storage buildings. |
| F2 | S of Spearman | Hansford | 0406 | 4 miles (6.4 km) | Several grain bins and a grain elevator were destroyed while one home, barns, equipment, and power poles were damaged. 2 people were injured. |
| F2 | S of Wheeler | Wheeler | 0517 | 6 miles (9.6 km) | Heavy damage to a home and farm equipment occurred. |
| F1 | Wichita Falls area | Wichita | 0546 | 4.5 miles (7.2 km) | Caused damage to trees, fences, signs, and a machine shop. |
| F1 | N of Era | Cooke | 0747 | 5.5 miles (8.8 km) | Roof, tree, and sign damage occurred. |
Oklahoma
| F2 | W of Elmwood | Beaver | 0440 | 12 miles (19.2 km) | Damage to two homes, several barns, farm equipment, power poles, trees and a windmill. |
| F1 | S of Elmwood | Beaver | 0500 | 6 miles (9.6 km) | Two barns and farm equipment were damaged or destroyed. |
| F0 | S of Beaver | Beaver | 0510 | 2 miles (3.2 km) | Minor damage to a home and a barn. |
Nebraska
| F0 | E of Red Cloud | Webster | 0612 | 3 miles (4.8 km) | Damage to an irrigation pipe, outbuildings, and trees. |
| F1 | W of Nelson | Nuckolls | 0639 | 12 miles (19.2 km) | Tornado remained over open country with damage to irrigation pipes, outbuildings, and trees. |
| F1 | E of Hebron | Thayer | 0649 | 1 miles (1.6 km) | One home was damaged, injuring one person. |
| F1 | N of Wymore | Gage | 0730 | 1 miles (1.6 km) | Extensive tree damage with some roof and structural damage. A mobile home was pushed off its foundation, a garage was damaged and grain bins were destroyed |
| F2 | NE of Virginia | Gage | 0740 | 2 miles (3.2 km) | One home was destroyed while six homes and businesses were damaged. 2 people were injured. |
Source: Tornado History Project – April 10, 2001 Storm Data

=== April 11 event ===
| F# | Location | County | Time (UTC) | Path length | Damage |
|---|---|---|---|---|---|
Oklahoma
| F2 | SW of Harjo | Pottawatomie | 0800 | 5 miles (8 km) | Caused damage to oil pumping and storage equipment. |
| F2 | SW of Jesse to NE of Lula | Pontotoc, Coal | 0940 | 14.5 miles (23.2 km) | A mobile home and two barns were destroyed. Oil storage tanks and a pumping unit were overturned. Transmission towers were also downed. A power substation sustained significant damage. |
| F2 | SW of Emet to NE of Wapanucka | Johnston, Atoka | 0945 | 19 miles (30.4 km) | 4 mobile homes were destroyed while a frame home and 21 other structures were damaged. 4 people were injured. |
| F0 | NE of Cumberland | Bryan | 0947 | 0.3 miles (0.5 km) | Damage was limited to trees. |
| F2 | E of Coalgate | Coal, Atoka | 1025 | 8 miles (14.4 km) | 1 death – A mobile home was destroyed killing an occupant, and a frame home was heavily damaged. Another mobile home had minor damage. |
| F1 | W of Garland | Haskell | 1226 | 3 miles (4.8 km) | One home was damaged and six barns were destroyed. |
Texas
| F1 | S of Muenster | Cooke | 0834 | 7.8 miles (12.5 km) | Roof and tree damage occurred. |
| F1 | NW of Gainesville to E of Thackerville, OK | Cooke, Love (OK) | 0855 | 19 miles (30.6 km) | A barn was destroyed and two mobile homes and a shed were heavily damaged. Tornado crossed the Oklahoma-Texas state line across the Red River six times. |
Missouri
| F0 | N of Dederick | Cedar | 1527 | 0.1 miles (0.16 km) | Brief touchdown with no damage |
| F3 | SW of Denver to NW of Patterson, IA | Gentry, Worth, Ringgold (IA), Union (IA), Clarke (IA), Madison (IA) | 1630 | 76.5 miles (122.4 km) | Strongest tornado and longest track of the outbreak. One home and several outbuildings were destroyed in Missouri. In Iowa, some homes were destroyed and others were damaged. Damage in Ringgold County alone was estimated at $1 million. A total of nine homes, one business, a school building, and a farmstead were damaged or destroyed. Livestock was killed as well. |
Nebraska
| F0 | Springfield area | Sarpy | 1715 | 0.1 miles (0.16 km) | Caused damage to a horse barn, a car, a trailer and power lines. |
Iowa
| F0 | SW of Emerson | Mills | 1737 | 2 miles (3.2 km) | Caused damage to 2 farmsteads, a pole shed, trailers, trees and a machine shed. |
| F1 | W of Mineola | Mills | 1745 | 2 miles (3.2 km) | 2 farms were damaged. A barn and a home were damaged while a hog shed was destroyed. |
| F1 | E of Taylor | Pottawattamie | 1755 | 0.5 miles (0.8 km) | Two barns and an outbuilding were destroyed while one home lost its roof. |
| F0 | NE of Dumfries | Pottawattamie | 1755 | 2 miles (3.2 km) | Weak tornado with no damage. |
| F0 | NW of Weston | Pottawattamie | 1800 | 0.2 miles (0.32 km) | Brief touchdown with no damage. |
| F0 | SE of Portsmouth | Shelby | 1830 | 0.2 miles (0.32 km) | Damage to power lines occurred. |
| F0 | Saylorville area | Polk | 1837 | 0.5 miles (0.8 km) | Brief touchdown with little or no damage. |
| F1 | E of Bayard | Guthrie | 1925 | 2 miles (3.2 km) | One barn was destroyed. |
| F0 | Jefferson area | Greene | 1945 | 0.5 miles (0.8 km) | Brief touchdown with no damage. |
| F0 | NE of Ogden | Boone | 2004 | 0.7 miles (1.1 km) | Brief touchdown with no damage. |
| F0 | SW of Paton | Greene | 2005 | 1 miles (1.6 km) | Brief touchdown with minor damage. |
| F1 | N of Ogden | Boone | 2006 | 3 miles (4.8 km) | A barn, grain bins, and a storage building were destroyed. One home had minor damage. Other buildings were also damaged. |
| F1 | W of Pilot Mound | Boone | 2010 | 4 miles (6.4 km) | Minor damage occurred. |
| F0 | E of Dayton | Webster | 2037 | 0.2 miles (0.32 km) | Caused damage to trailers and a building. |
| F1 | S of Webster City | Hamilton | 2038 | 2.2 miles (3.5 km) | Two farm buildings were blown down. |
| F1 | Colfax to Rhodes | Jasper, Marshall | 2040 | 17.5 miles (28 km) | Intermittent track over open country with little damage. |
| F2 | Agency | Wapello | 2100 | 8.4 miles (13.4 km) | 2 deaths – A lodge was destroyed and 50 residences were damaged, some severely. 3 other people were injured. |
| F0 | SW of Kinross | Keokuk | 2125 | 3 miles (4.8 km) | Weak tornado with little or no damage. |
| F0 | NW of Holbrook | Iowa | 2140 | 0.1 miles (0.16 km) | Brief touchdown with no damage. |
| F0 | NW of Kalona | Washington | 2150 | 0.1 miles (0.16 km) | Brief touchdown with no damage. |
| F0 | NW of Windham | Johnson | 2200 | 2 miles (3.2 km) | A barn and a garage were destroyed. |
| F0 | SE of Tiffin | Johnson | 2202 | 0.1 miles (0.16 km) | Brief touchdown with no damage. |
| F1 | E of Washburn | Black Hawk | 2207 | 10 miles (16 km) | Two homes sustained significant damage. |
| F0 | NW of Swisher | Johnson | 2220 | 0.1 miles (0.16 km) | Brief touchdown with little or no damage. |
| F0 | Cedar Rapids area | Linn | 2220 | 0.1 miles (0.16 km) | Brief touchdown with no damage. |
| F0 | NW of Vinton | Benton | 2220 | 0.1 miles (0.16 km) | One barn was destroyed and several trees were downed. |
| F1 | NW of West Union | Fayette | 2250 | 2 miles (3.2 km) | Several barns, sheds and outbuildings were damaged or destroyed. One person was trapped and injured. |
Michigan
| F0 | NE of Cloverville | Muskegon | 2340 | 0.1 miles (0.16 km) | Brief touchdown with no damage. |
| F0 | NW of Coopersville | Ottawa | 2342 | 0.1 miles (0.16 km) | Brief touchdown with no damage. |
Source: Tornado History Project – April 11, 2001 Storm Data

== Tri-state hailstorm ==
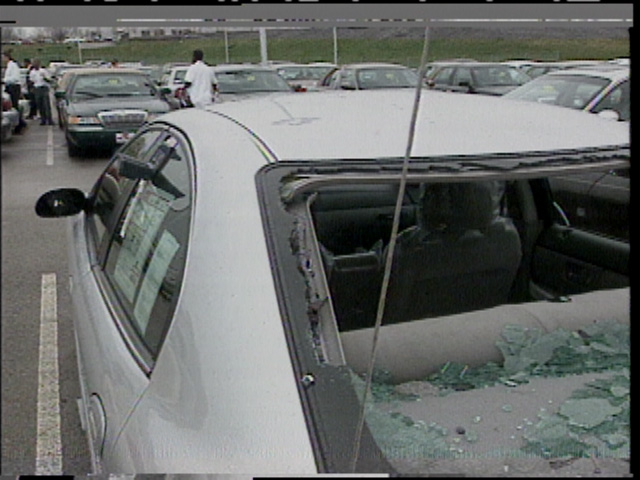
Hail damage to vehicles in Missouri (NWS St. Louis)

On April 10, 2001 a series of long-lived supercell thunderstorms moved from south-southwest of Kansas City, Kansas, across Missouri and often along I-70, impacting Columbia before striking the St. Louis metropolitan area, continuing into southern Illinois. The storms spawned ten weak tornadoes, one of which resulted in the first tornado fatality in Missouri since 1994.

Additionally, it produced the largest (in area) and longest (in distance and duration) recorded swaths of very large hail, up to baseball size, and also caused the most expensive damages of any hailstorm in U.S. history. At $2 billion in insured losses, it was more costly in real dollars than the most damaging tornado at that time, the Bridge Creek–Moore tornado of May 3, 1999. The cost of both were eclipsed by the catastrophic Joplin tornado in 2011, which cost $2.8 billion.

Hundreds of vehicles outside a Ford Assembly Plant in Hazelwood were damaged as well as almost every house within the city of Florissant in St. Louis County. Many automobile dealerships lost their entire auto inventory while thousands of additional homes were damaged. At Lambert International Airport, 22 jetliners suffered hail damage, while 10 aircraft of the Missouri National Guard were severely damaged.

== See also ==
- List of North American tornadoes and tornado outbreaks
- List of costly or deadly hailstorms
- Tornadoes of 2001
