= List of Storm Prediction Center high risk days =

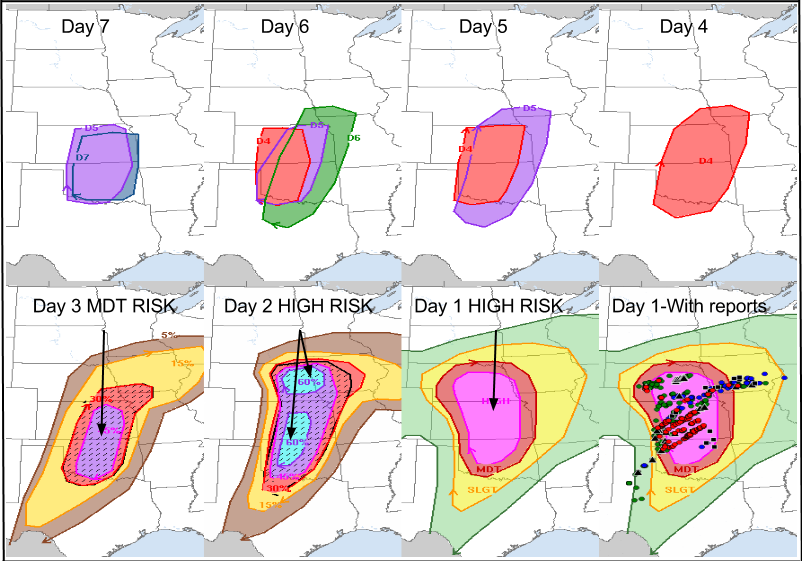
Progression of a well-anticipated high risk event across the Central Plains on April 14, 2012. This event ultimately produced 85 tornadoes that day, one of which killed six people.

A high risk severe weather event is the greatest threat level issued by the Storm Prediction Center (SPC) for convective weather events in the United States. On the scale from one to five, a high risk is a level five. A high risk is usually for major tornado outbreaks with numerous strong to violent tornadoes expected, and occasionally derechos with widespread destructive wind gusts, and these outlooks are typically reserved for the most extreme events. They are generally only issued on the day of the event. However, as of May 2026, there have been three occurrences (April 7, 2006, April 14, 2012, and March 15, 2025) of a high risk being issued for Day 2 of the outlook period (with the event occurring the following day). Due to how the risk levels are calculated based on probability, a high risk cannot be issued for Day 3 of the outlook period.

== High risk days ==
=== 1982–1989 ===
Thirty-four high risks were issued in the 1980s.

Storm Prediction Center High Risk Events – 1982–1989 (Note: All values include events that took place outside the high-risk area(s). Tornado and fatality totals only include incidents that occurred on the respective high risk days. Fatality totals only include direct tornadic deaths.)
Date	Year	Region	Tornadoes	Max rating	Peak gust	Fatalities	Outlook	Notes
April 2	1982	Midwest, Southern U.S.	63	F5		27		Tornado outbreak of April 2–3, 1982 – Sixty-three tornadoes were confirmed; one was rated F5. The first ever PDS Tornado Watch was issued on this date.
December 24	1982	Southern U.S.	26	F4		3		Twenty-six tornadoes were confirmed; one was rated F4.
April 1	1983	Midwest, Southern U.S.	13	F4		2		Thirteen tornadoes were confirmed; one was rated F4.
July 2	1983	Midwest	3	F1		0		Only three weak tornadoes were confirmed; one was rated F1.
March 27	1984	Southern U.S.	11	F1		0		Eleven weak tornadoes were confirmed; six were rated F1.
March 28	1984	Southern U.S.	24	F4		57		1984 Carolinas tornado outbreak – Twenty-four tornadoes were confirmed; seven were rated F4. In addition to the 57 tornadic deaths, 1,249 people were injured. This was and remained the deadliest official high risk day (since SELS/SPC high risk outlooks began) for over 27 years, surpassed by the Super Outbreak of April 27, 2011.
April 26	1984	Great Plains	33	F4		12		Thirty-three tornadoes were confirmed; one was rated F4.
April 29	1984	Midwest, Southern U.S.	42	F4		1		Forty-two tornadoes were confirmed; one was rated F4.
May 3	1984	Southern U.S.	38	F3		5		Thirty-eight tornadoes were confirmed; one was rated F3.
October 18	1984	Midwest, Southern U.S.	8	F3		2		Eight tornadoes were confirmed; one was rated F3.
April 21	1985	Upper Midwest	22	F3		3		Twenty-two tornadoes were confirmed; one was rated F3.
April 22	1985	Southern U.S.	11	F2		0		Eleven tornadoes were confirmed; two were rated F2.
May 11	1985	Midwest, Southern U.S.	24	F1		0		Twenty-four weak tornadoes were confirmed; three were rated F1.
May 13	1985	Midwest, Southern U.S.	14	F2		0		Fourteen tornadoes were confirmed; three were rated F2.
May 30	1985	Midwest	17	F3		2		Seventeen tornadoes were confirmed; one was rated F3.
July 4	1985	Midwest	3	F1		0		Mainly a wind and hail event. Three weak tornadoes were confirmed; two were rated F1.
March 11	1986	Southern U.S.	4	F2		0		Tornado outbreak of March 10–12, 1986 – Four tornadoes were confirmed; one was rated F2.
April 19	1986	Southern U.S.	13	F3		1		Fourteen tornadoes were confirmed; one was rated F3.
March 22	1987	Oklahoma, Texas	9	F3		0		Nine tornadoes were confirmed; one was rated F3.
May 28	1987	Texas	7	F2		0		Seven tornadoes were confirmed; one was rated F2.
July 20	1987	Michigan	4	F0		0		Produced a derecho with damaging downburst winds. Four weak tornadoes were confirmed.
November 16	1987	Alabama, Louisiana, Mississippi	28	F2		0		Twenty-eight tornadoes were confirmed; six were rated F2.
December 14	1987	Southern U.S.	5	F3		6		Five tornadoes were confirmed; one was rated F3. The F3 tornado struck the northern portions of the Memphis metropolitan area.
January 19	1988	Alabama, Louisiana, Mississippi, Tennessee	14	F4		5		Earliest date that a high risk was issued. Fourteen tornadoes were confirmed; one was rated F4.
March 24	1988	Midwest, Southern U.S.	10	F2		0		Damaging squall line with tornadoes. Ten tornadoes were confirmed; three were rated F2.
November 4	1988	Southern U.S.	18	F3		0		Eighteen tornadoes were confirmed; four were rated F3.
November 15	1988	Midwest	44	F3		7		Late season tornado outbreak. Forty-four tornadoes were confirmed; three were rated F3.
November 26	1988	Southern U.S.	9	F2		0		Nine tornadoes were confirmed; two were rated F2.
March 5	1989	Alabama, Georgia, Tennessee	9	F3		1		Nine tornadoes were confirmed; one was rated F3.
May 16	1989	Oklahoma, Texas, New Mexico	20	F4		1		Only high risk ever issued for New Mexico. Twenty tornadoes were confirmed; one was rated F4.
May 17	1989	Louisiana, Texas	19	F3		1		Nineteen tornadoes were confirmed; one was rated F3.
May 24	1989	Midwest	31	F4		0		Thirty-one tornadoes were confirmed; two were rated F4.
June 13	1989	Louisiana, Texas	1	F1		0		Only one tornado was confirmed. The high risk was issued in the 1300 UTC outlook and removed from all subsequent outlooks.
November 15	1989	Southern U.S.	17	F4		21		November 1989 tornado outbreak – Seventeen tornadoes were confirmed; one was rated F4.

=== 1990–1999 ===
Sixty high risks were issued in the 1990s.

Storm Prediction Center High Risk Events – 1990–1999
Date	Year	Region	Tornadoes	Max rating	Peak gust	Fatalities	Outlook	Notes
February 1	1990	Arkansas, Louisiana, Oklahoma, Texas	1	F1		0		One weak tornado was confirmed. Only the 1200 UTC outlook included a high risk.
March 14	1990	Southern U.S.	11	F3		1		Eleven tornadoes were confirmed; one was rated F3.
May 9	1990	Midwest	4	F2		0		Four tornadoes were confirmed; two were rated F2. Only the 1200 UTC outlook included a high risk.
May 15	1990	Arkansas, Illinois, Indiana, Kansas, Kentucky, Missouri, Tennessee, Oklahoma	17	F3		1		Seventeen tornadoes were confirmed; one was rated F3.
May 20	1990	Arkansas, Kansas, Oklahoma	10	F2		0		Ten tornadoes were confirmed; one was rated F2. Only the 1900 UTC outlook included a high risk.
May 29	1990	Kansas, Oklahoma, Texas	9	F2		0		Mainly a damaging wind threat. Nine tornadoes were confirmed; one was rated F2. Only the 1900 UTC outlook included a high risk.
June 1	1990	Great Plains	21	F4		2		Twenty-one tornadoes were confirmed; one was rated F4.
June 2	1990	Ohio Valley	68	F4		9		June 1990 Lower Ohio Valley tornado outbreak – Sixty-eight tornadoes were confirmed; seven were rated F4.
March 22	1991	Midwest, Southern U.S.	23	F3		6		Twenty-three tornadoes were confirmed; three were rated F3.
March 26	1991	Kansas, Missouri, Oklahoma	21	F4		0		Twenty-one tornadoes were confirmed; one was rated F4. Only the 1900 UTC outlook included a high risk.
March 27	1991	Midwest	29	F3		2		Twenty-nine tornadoes were confirmed; six were rated F3.
March 29	1991	Alabama, Florida, Georgia, North Carolina, South Carolina, Virginia	21	F3		0		Twenty-one tornadoes were confirmed; one was rated F3.
April 11	1991	Oklahoma, Kansas, Texas	7	F3		0		Severe weather outbreak did not consolidate due to a lack of moisture and instability anticipated to develop. Seven tornadoes were confirmed; one was rated F3.
April 12	1991	Oklahoma, Kansas, Texas	24	F3		0		Twenty-four tornadoes were confirmed; two were rated F3.
April 26	1991	Central U.S.	55	F5		21		Tornado outbreak of April 26, 1991 – Fifty-five tornadoes were confirmed; the strongest was the Andover, KS F5.
April 28	1991	Eastern Oklahoma and Kansas	13	F2		0		Thunderstorm complex early in the day prevented significant moisture from moving into the region and ultimately limited severe weather activity. Thirteen tornadoes were confirmed; two were rated F2.
April 19	1992	Arkansas, Louisiana, Oklahoma, Texas	4	F1		0		Four weak tornadoes were confirmed; three were rated F1.
June 16	1992	Midwest	65	F5		1		Mid-June 1992 tornado outbreak – Sixty-five tornadoes were confirmed; the strongest was the Chandler-Lake Wilson, MN F5.
June 17	1992	Great Lakes	28	F3		0		Mid-June 1992 tornado outbreak – Twenty-eight tornadoes were confirmed; one was rated F3.
June 19	1992	Arkansas, Kansas, Louisiana, Oklahoma, Texas	17	F1		0		Seventeen tornadoes were confirmed; three were rated F1. Only the 1900 UTC outlook included a high risk.
July 2	1992	Arkansas, Illinois, Iowa, Kansas, Missouri, Oklahoma, Wisconsin	16	F3		0		Sixteen tornadoes were confirmed; one was rated F3.
September 9	1992	Illinois, Indiana, Kansas, Missouri	4	F1		0		Only high risk ever issued in September. Squall line with damaging winds and some large hail. Four weak tornadoes were confirmed; one was rated F1.
April 19	1993	Arkansas, Illinois, Kentucky, Missouri, Tennessee	6	F2		0		Six tornadoes were confirmed; one was rated F2.
June 3	1993	Arkansas, Illinois, Kansas, Kentucky, Missouri, Oklahoma, Tennessee	0	—N/a		0		A high risk was issued for a derecho. No tornadoes were confirmed. Day 1 of 2 for the derecho.
June 4	1993	Kentucky, North Carolina, Tennessee, Virginia, West Virginia	13	F1	100 mph (160 km/h)	0		Major derecho event. The Lynchburg, Virginia area was hit the hardest. The city had a wind gust to 80 mph, with significant damage reported. Power was cut to 95% of the city. Thirteen tornadoes were confirmed; six were rated F1. Only the 1900 UTC outlook had a high risk.
June 7	1993	Upper Midwest	40	F4		0		Forty tornadoes were confirmed; two were rated F4.
June 8	1993	Great Plains, Upper Midwest	58	F3		0		Fifty-eight tornadoes were confirmed; one was rated F3.
June 23	1993	Kansas, Nebraska	3	F2		0		Only three tornadoes were confirmed; one was rated F2.
July 3	1993	Iowa, Minnesota, Nebraska, North Dakota, South Dakota	13	F1		0		Thirteen weak tornadoes were confirmed; four were rated F1.
March 27	1994	Southern U.S.	29	F4		40		1994 Palm Sunday tornado outbreak – Twenty-nine tornadoes were confirmed; two were rated F4. Only the 1900 UTC outlook included a high risk.
April 25	1994	Central U.S.	28	F4		3		Tornado outbreak of April 25–27, 1994 – Twenty-eight tornadoes were confirmed; one was rated F4. In addition, there were numerous large hail reports, with hail reaching 4.50".
June 14	1994	Michigan, Minnesota, Wisconsin	3	F1		0		Three weak tornadoes were confirmed; one was rated F1. Only the 1200 UTC outlook included a high risk.
August 27	1994	Iowa, Michigan, Minnesota, Nebraska, South Dakota, Wisconsin	12	F3		4		Only high risk ever issued in August. Twelve tornadoes were confirmed; two were rated F3. The same system also produced an F4 in Turtle Mountain, Manitoba in Canada.
November 27	1994	Southern U.S.	18	F3		6		Eighteen tornadoes were confirmed; four were rated F3.
April 17	1995	Oklahoma, Texas	21	F2		0		Primarily a derecho event. Twenty-one tornadoes were confirmed; two were rated F2.
May 7	1995	Kansas, Oklahoma, Texas	33	F3		6		Tornado outbreak sequence of May 6–27, 1995 – Day one of a 5-day event. Thirty-three tornadoes were confirmed; two were rated F3.
May 12	1995	Arkansas, Iowa, Kansas, Missouri, Nebraska, Oklahoma	14	F2		0		Tornado outbreak sequence of May 6–27, 1995 – Twelve tornadoes were confirmed; two were rated F2.
May 13	1995	Ohio Valley	26	F4		3		Tornado outbreak sequence of May 6–27, 1995 – Included a major derecho. Twenty-six tornadoes were confirmed; two were rated F4.
May 17	1995	Oklahoma	9	F3		0		Tornado outbreak sequence of May 6–27, 1995 – Nine tornadoes were confirmed; one was rated F3.
March 18	1996	Alabama, Florida, Georgia, Mississippi, South Carolina	21	F3		0		Twenty-one tornadoes were confirmed; one was rated F3.
April 19	1996	Illinois, Indiana, Missouri, Kentucky	60	F3	104 mph (167 km/h)	1		Tornado outbreak sequence of April 1996 – A total of 60 tornadoes were confirmed; six were rated F3.
March 2	1997	Alabama, Louisiana, Mississippi	2	F0		0		Two weak and short lived tornadoes were confirmed. Only the 1900 UTC outlook included a high risk.
May 2	1997	Alabama, Mississippi	8	F3	92 mph (148 km/h)	1		Also a derecho event. Eight tornadoes were confirmed; two were rated F3.
July 1	1997	Upper Mississippi Valley	20	F3	109 mph (175 km/h)	0		Moderate tornado outbreak reorganized into a progressive derecho. Twenty tornadoes were confirmed; one was rated F3. High risk was discontinued at 02Z.
October 25	1997	Arkansas, Louisiana, Mississippi, Oklahoma, Texas	9	F1		0		Nine tornadoes were confirmed; four were rated F1. Only the 1900 UTC outlook included a high risk.
February 10	1998	Alabama, Louisiana, Mississippi, Texas	11	F1	135 mph (217 km/h)	0		High risk issued 15Z and discontinued 02Z. Rare winter serial derecho. Eleven tornadoes were confirmed; five were rated F1.
April 8	1998	Alabama	14	F5	92 mph (148 km/h)	35		Tornado outbreak of April 6–9, 1998 – High risk lasted the entire outlook cycle. Fourteen tornadoes were confirmed, including the Birmingham, AL F5 tornado.
April 15	1998	Middle Mississippi Valley	21	F4	75 mph (121 km/h)	2		Tornado outbreak of April 15–16, 1998 – High risk issued 12Z and discontinued 02Z. Day 1 of outbreak. Twenty-one tornadoes were confirmed; one was rated F4.
April 16	1998	Tennessee	41	F5	98 mph (158 km/h)	12		Tornado outbreak of April 15–16, 1998 – High risk issued 15Z and subsequently maintained. Day 2 of outbreak. Forty-one tornadoes were confirmed; one was rated F5.
May 9	1998	Arkansas, Mississippi, Tennessee	5	F1		0		Five weak tornadoes were confirmed; one was rated F1. Only the 1930 UTC outlook included a high risk.
May 31	1998	Northeastern U.S.	42	F3	128 mph (206 km/h)	1		Late-May 1998 tornado outbreak and derecho – Only high risk ever issued in the Northeast (although it was discontinued and reduced to moderate risk at 1930Z, following a morning remnant derecho but prior to/concurrent with occurrence of afternoon into overnight severe weather outbreak). Forty-two tornadoes were confirmed; six were rated F3.
June 14	1998	Ohio Valley	22	F1	92 mph (148 km/h)	0		High risk was issued 15Z and discontinued 02Z. Followed by a progressive derecho. Twenty-two tornadoes were confirmed; six were rated F1.
January 21	1999	Arkansas	82	F4		8		Tornado outbreak of January 21–23, 1999 – largest outbreak in the month of January; High risk was maintained through the day. Second earliest date that a high risk was issued. Eighty-two tornadoes were confirmed; one was rated F4.
March 8	1999	Arkansas, Louisiana, Texas	10	F2		0		High risk was issued 13Z and discontinued 01Z. Few tornadoes with some scattered hail and wind.
April 8	1999	Iowa, Missouri, Illinois	47	F4		2		Tornado outbreak of April 8–9, 1999 – High risk was maintained through the day. Fifty-four tornadoes were confirmed; three were rated F4. Some occurred overnight, outside the 01Z high risk area.
May 3	1999	Oklahoma, Kansas	73	F5		46		1999 Great Plains tornado outbreak – High risk was issued at 20Z and maintained thereafter. Highest winds ever recorded in a tornado, 321 mph (517 km/h); seventy-three tornadoes were confirmed, including three F4s and the Bridge Creek-Moore F5.
May 4	1999	Oklahoma, Arkansas, Texas	43	F3		1		1999 Great Plains tornado outbreak – High risk was issued 06Z and discontinued at 01Z. Day 2 of outbreak
May 5	1999	Southern U.S.	15	F4		3		1999 Great Plains tornado outbreak – High risk was issued 13Z and discontinued 01Z. Only streak of three consecutive High risk days as of March 2025. Major derecho event.
June 5	1999	South Dakota, Nebraska	21	F1		0		High risk was maintained throughout the day; however, event failed to consolidate with only isolated tornadoes and scattered severe wind reported. A shortwave ridge maintained a capping inversion.

=== 2000–2009 ===
There were no high risk days in 2000. Thirty-eight high risks were issued in the 2000s.

Storm Prediction Center High Risk Events – 2000–2009 (Note: Starting on February 1, 2007, the Fujita Scale was replaced with the Enhanced Fujita Scale for rating tornadoes.)
Date	Year	Region	Tornadoes	Max rating	Peak gust	Fatalities	Outlook	Notes
April 6	2001	Texas Panhandle, Western Oklahoma, much of Kansas, and extreme southern Nebraska	6	F2	124 mph (200 km/h)^{†}	0		Tornadoes of 2001#April 6–7 – The high risk was issued at 0600Z and discontinued at 0100Z. A serial derecho formed, producing widespread wind damage. 162 damaging wind gusts were reported, including 12 hurricane force. One person was killed by lightning in Ohio. Six tornadoes were also confirmed; two were rated F2.
April 11	2001	Eastern Iowa, Southern Wisconsin, and northwest Illinois	33	F3	92 mph (148 km/h)	3		Tornado outbreak of April 10–11, 2001 – The High risk was issued at 1630Z and discontinued at 0100Z. Three people were killed by tornadoes. The event also featured the costly Tri-State hailstorm on the prior day. Thirty-three tornadoes were confirmed; one was rated F3.
June 11	2001	Southern Minnesota, Northeastern Iowa, and West-Central Wisconsin	29	F2	120 mph (190 km/h)	1		Tornadoes of 2001#June 11–13 – The high risk was issued at 2000Z and maintained at 0100Z. A progressive derecho produced widespread wind damage, including a measured thunderstorm wind gust of 120 miles per hour (193 km/h) near Atwater, Minnesota. 194 damaging wind gusts were reported, including 5 hurricane force. Twenty-nine tornadoes were also confirmed; one was rated F2. However, some of the tornadoes were associated with landfalling Tropical Storm Allison, not the system that triggered the high risk. One of the tornadoes in Florida killed one person.
October 13	2001	U.S. Gulf Coast	32	F3	112 mph (180 km/h)^{†}	1		The high risk was issued for only the 2000Z update. Thirty-two tornadoes were confirmed; one was rated F3. One person was killed by straight-line winds in Illinois.
October 24	2001	Midwest	25	F3	104 mph (167 km/h)^{†}	2		Tornadoes of 2001#October 24 – The high risk was maintained throughout the entire day (smaller at 0100Z ahead of the most intense storms over Ohio at that time). A significant tornado event was concentrated mostly in northern portions of the high risk area, with nearly the entire high risk area also experiencing a major serial derecho. One person was killed by straight-line winds in Michigan while another person was also killed in Tennessee. Twenty-five tornadoes were confirmed; two were rated F3. Over 446 damaging wind gusts were reported across 18 states, including 2 hurricane force.
April 16	2002	Upper Midwest	14	F3	85 mph (137 km/h)^{†}	1		This was the last time a High Risk was issued by SPC with no surrounding "Moderate Risk" area. The high risk was issued at 0600Z update; it was removed at 2000Z outlook update due to concern over the extent of how favorable conditions would be for severe weather. However, the initiation of the most intense severe weather occurred after that time. Fourteen tornadoes, with one being rated F3, were confirmed, but were all in Texas and Oklahoma, well outside the high risk. However, widespread hail damage occurred and one person was killed by straight-line winds in Kansas.
July 31	2002	Minnesota, Wisconsin	3	F0	75 mph (121 km/h)^{†}	0		Only the 0600Z outlook included a high risk, which was for a significant wind event instead of tornadoes. This is the only day in which a High Risk was issued in only the initial Day 1 outlook, and the second consecutive high risk issuance to be downgraded to a moderate risk before the expected onset of the highest severe weather potential; such a downgrade remains rare as of 2025. It is also the most recent use of a high risk during the July through September period (typically a mid and late summer into very early fall minimum for such outlooks). No fatalities took place. Three weak tornadoes were confirmed. Most severe weather was damaging wind reports.
November 10	2002	Midwest and Southern U.S.	67	F4	100 mph (160 km/h)^{†}	34		Tornado outbreak of November 9–11, 2002 – This was the second and most intense day of a late fall tornado outbreak. The high risk was maintained throughout the entire day and is the only time since 1990 in which a fall high risk was issued in back to back years (see October 24, 2001). The issuance of a high risk at the initial 06Z Day 1 Outlook notably followed a Day 2 Outlook for the same period that did not contain a moderate risk area, as both Day 2 outlooks issued the day before included only an enhanced slight risk. This is the last time as of 2025 that a High Risk outlook was issued for a 12Z-12Z convective period without at least one prior Moderate Risk outlook valid for the same period. The main high risk area featured numerous tornadoes, including a pair of long-tracked F-3s. However, the strongest tornado, rated F-4, occurred in a separate, significant outbreak over Ohio, outside the high hisk. The 01z outlook extended the moderate and high risk zones north into this area, but few tornadoes would occur in this area beyond 01Z, while significant tornadoes continued past 01Z in southern portions of the high risk area. In total, sixty-one tornadoes were confirmed. Thirty-one people were killed during the outlook period.
December 23	2002	Texas, Louisiana	15	F1	70 mph (110 km/h)^{†}	0		Tornadoes of 2002#December 23–24 – One of only two high risks ever issued in December and second latest in the year (first was December 24, 1982). The high risk was maintained throughout the entire day for both widespread wind damage and isolated strong tornadoes, but the day busted as a whole. Fifteen tornadoes were confirmed; three were rated F1.
April 6	2003	Texas, Louisiana, Mississippi	18	F3	83 mph (134 km/h)	0		Tornadoes of 2003#April 4–7 – The high risk was issued at 1630Z and subsequently maintained. Eighteen tornadoes were confirmed; one was rated F3.
May 4	2003	Central U.S.	79	F4	89 mph (143 km/h)^{†}	38		May 2003 tornado outbreak sequence – Most prolific day of an at the time record setting tornado outbreak sequence. The high risk was issued at 13Z and subsequently maintained. Seventy-nine tornadoes were confirmed; four were rated F4.
May 5	2003	Southern U.S.	28	F3	104 mph (167 km/h)^{†}	0		May 2003 tornado outbreak sequence – The high risk was issued at 1630Z and discontinued at 01Z. Twenty-eight tornadoes were confirmed; one was rated F3.
May 8	2003	Kansas, Oklahoma	45	F4	104 mph (167 km/h)	0		May 2003 tornado outbreak sequence – The high risk was issued at 1630Z and expanded southward at 20Z, then fully discontinued at 01Z. Forty-five tornadoes were confirmed; one was rated F4 (occurring in the area not upgraded to a high risk until 20Z).
May 10	2003	Central U.S.	49	F3	92 mph (148 km/h)^{†}	0		May 2003 tornado outbreak sequence – The high risk was issued at 13Z and subsequently maintained. Forty-nine tornadoes were confirmed; three were rated F3. Also included 35% tornado probability area, above the 25% (prior to 2006) minimum threshold for a high risk.
May 15	2003	Texas, Oklahoma	47	F2	92 mph (148 km/h)^{†}	0		The high risk spanned the entire Day 1 Outlook cycle. Forty-seven tornadoes were confirmed; seven were rated F2.
March 4	2004	Texas, Oklahoma	25	F2	91 mph (146 km/h)	0		The high risk was issued at 1630Z and discontinued at 01Z. Reorganized into a large serial derecho. Twenty-five tornadoes were confirmed; two were rated F2.
May 22	2004	Nebraska, Iowa	68	F4	106 mph (171 km/h)	1		May 2004 tornado outbreak sequence/2004 Hallam tornado – Sixty-eight tornadoes were confirmed; one was rated F4. The F4 tornado was the largest tornado on record at the time with a peak width of 2.5 miles (4.0 km) as it struck Hallam, Nebraska. This is the first time a high risk did not appear until the 01Z outlook (which was prior to the Hallam tornado) within an outlook cycle, which has occurred one additional time since (on April 30, 2010).
May 24	2004	Nebraska, Iowa	54	F2	104 mph (167 km/h)^{†}	1		May 2004 tornado outbreak sequence – The high risk lasted the entire Day 1 Outlook cycle. Also a major derecho event. Included a 45% sig risk for damaging winds, meeting high risk criteria for the time (prior to 2006). Fifty-four tornadoes were confirmed; two were rated F2. 128 damaging wind gusts were reported, including 3 hurricane force.
May 29	2004	Central U.S.	80	F4	90 mph (140 km/h)	3		May 2004 tornado outbreak sequence – The high risk lasted the entire Day 1 Outlook cycle. Eighty tornadoes were confirmed; one was rated F4.
May 30	2004	Central U.S.	86	F3	120 mph (190 km/h)^{†}	2		May 2004 tornado outbreak sequence – For the second consecutive May and the last occurrence as of March 2025, a fourth high risk day was issued in an eight-day period. The high risk lasted the entire Day 1 Outlook cycle. Eighty-six tornadoes were confirmed; two were rated F3. Included 35% tornado risk area above the (at the time) minimum threshold of 25%.
April 11	2005	Louisiana, Mississippi	3	F0	86 mph (138 km/h)	0		Only the 1630Z outlook had a high risk. Three weak tornadoes were confirmed.
June 4	2005	Central U.S.	44	F2	81 mph (130 km/h)^{†}	0		The high risk was issued at 13Z and discontinued at 01Z. Forty-four tornadoes were confirmed; one was rated F2.
November 15	2005	Midwest and Southern U.S.	49	F4	98 mph (158 km/h)^{†}	1		Mid-November 2005 tornado outbreak – The high risk lasted the entire outlook cycle. Forty-nine tornadoes were confirmed; one was rated F4. This was the only violent tornado to be recorded in 2005. Two days later, portions of the High Risk area had below freezing high temperatures - the coldest conditions within two of any High Risk outlook since at least 1995.
March 12	2006	Midwest	59	F4	107 mph (172 km/h)^{†}	8		Tornado outbreak sequence of March 9–13, 2006 – The high risk lasted the entire outlook cycle. This was the first High Risk to use a 30% tornado probability, which became the minimum threshold in 2006 (25% and 35% contours were discontinued). Fifty-nine tornadoes were confirmed; one was rated F4. Most F2+ tornadoes were in Missouri, making it one of the state's strongest tornado outbreaks, and the strongest this early in the year. One supercell storm tracked nearly 800 miles from Oklahoma to Michigan, producing many tornadoes along its path.
April 6	2006	Nebraska, Kansas	12	F2	82 mph (132 km/h)	0		Tornado outbreak of April 6–8, 2006 – The high risk was issued at 13Z and subsequently maintained. Twelve tornadoes were confirmed; one was rated F2.
April 7	2006	Southern U.S.	47	F3	92 mph (148 km/h)^{†}	10		Tornado outbreak of April 6–8, 2006 – Only known high risk to include a 60% tornado contour, the highest level issued by the SPC. It was also the first of only three known occurrences (the others being April 14, 2012 and March 15, 2025) in which a Day 2 high risk outlook was issued, and the high risk persisted for the entire Day 1 Outlook cycle. This aforementioned Day 2 high risk produced the first/only instance to date (as of 2025) where a high risk was simultaneously in effect for both Day 1 (see April 6, 2006 above) and Day 2, and a simultaneous occurrence of a Day 1 moderate risk and Day 2 high risk was not observed until March 14–15, 2025. Forty-seven tornadoes were confirmed; two were rated F3.
March 1	2007	Southern U.S.	42	EF4	81 mph (130 km/h)^{†}	20		Tornado outbreak of February 28 – March 2, 2007 – The high risk was issued 06Z and discontinued 01Z. 42 tornadoes were confirmed during the outlook period; two were rated EF4.
April 13	2007	Texas	7	EF1	81 mph (130 km/h)^{†}	1		April 2007 nor'easter – The high risk was issued at 20Z and subsequently maintained. However, only seven tornadoes were confirmed during the outlook period; one was rated EF1. That tornado caused a fatality in the DFW area.
April 24	2007	Texas	23	EF3	90 mph (140 km/h)^{†}	10		Tornado outbreak sequence of April 20–27, 2007 – The high risk was issued at 20Z and subsequently maintained. 23 tornadoes were confirmed during the outlook period; one was rated F4 in Mexico before crossing the international border and causing EF3 damage in Texas. However, this all occurred outside the high-risk area, which saw virtually no activity. Additionally, other than the F4 tornado, no other tornado was rated higher the EF1.
May 5	2007	Nebraska, Kansas	92	EF3	100 mph (160 km/h)	1		Tornado outbreak of May 4–6, 2007 – The high risk was issued at 13Z and subsequently maintained. 92 tornadoes were confirmed during the outlook period; two were rated EF3.
June 7	2007	Upper Midwest	12	EF3	81 mph (130 km/h)^{†}	0		Tornadoes of 2007#June 6–8 (U.S. and Canada) – The high risk was issued at 06Z and discontinued at 01Z. Reorganized into a moderate wind event. Included a 60% sig risk for damaging winds for the 1200z outlook before being switched back to a 30% sig tornado risk in the 1300z outlook. This is the latest date in the spring severe weather season during the 20th century that a 30% tornado area has been issued. 12 tornadoes were confirmed; one was rated EF3. This included an isolated EF0 tornado in Florida. 135 damaging gusts were reported. However, the 3 hurricane-force wind gusts occurred in Missouri, outside the high risk.
February 5	2008	Middle Mississippi Valley	86	EF4	100 mph (160 km/h)^{†}	57		2008 Super Tuesday tornado outbreak – The high risk was issued at 13Z and subsequently maintained. 86 tornadoes were confirmed during the outlook period; five were rated EF4. One EF4 tornado in Arkansas tracked over 120 miles. One of only two high risks issued in January or February since January 21, 1999, continuing to present, with the other being January 22, 2017. This was the deadliest day at the time for tornadoes since May 31, 1985.
March 15	2008	Georgia, South Carolina	44	EF3	100 mph (160 km/h)^{†}	2		2008 Atlanta tornado outbreak – Only the 20Z outlook had a high risk area. 44 tornadoes were confirmed during the outlook period; three were rated EF3.
May 22	2008	Kansas	28	EF3	100 mph (160 km/h)^{†}	1		Tornado outbreak of May 22–27, 2008 – The high risk was issued at 20Z and subsequently maintained. 28 tornadoes were confirmed during the outlook period; one was rated EF3, although it occurred to the west in Colorado well before the high risk was issued.
May 29	2008	Nebraska, Iowa, South Dakota	40	EF3	85 mph (137 km/h)^{†}	0		Tornadoes of 2008#May 28–31 – The high risk was issued at 1630Z and discontinued at 01Z. 40 tornadoes were confirmed during the outlook period; two were rated EF3.
June 5	2008	Midwest	40	EF2	100 mph (160 km/h)^{†}	0		Tornado outbreak sequence of June 3–11, 2008 – The high risk was issued at 13Z and subsequently maintained. Also included a 60% significant severe wind probability, which meets high risk standards (the High Risk area in the 01Z outlook was sustained by this wind risk, with a maximum 15% tornado probability in that outlook; and the 30% tornado area in prior outlooks was considerably smaller than the 60% wind area). 40 tornadoes were confirmed during the outlook period; three were rated EF2. 261 damaging wind gusts were reported including 10 hurricane-force which were up to 100 mph, though many occurred south of the high risk.
April 10	2009	Alabama, Georgia, Tennessee	61	EF4	96 mph (154 km/h)^{†}	2		Tornado outbreak of April 9–11, 2009 – Only the 20Z outlook had a high risk. 61 tornadoes were confirmed during the outlook period; one was rated EF4.
April 26	2009	Oklahoma, Kansas, Texas	11	EF2	81 mph (130 km/h)^{†}	0		Tornadoes of 2009#April 25–26 (United States and Canada) – 11 tornadoes were confirmed during the outlook period; one was rated EF2. The high risk was issued at 1630Z and, despite the maintenance of the high risk through the rest of the day, the outbreak busted as a whole.
† – Value is estimated

=== 2010–2019 ===
There were no high risk days in 2015, 2016, or 2018. This is the first decade to feature multiple years without a High Risk. 2018 was also the only year since 1950 to feature no violent (EF4+ tornadoes) nationwide. Twenty-three high risks were issued in the 2010s.

Storm Prediction Center High Risk Events – 2010–2019
Date	Year	Region	Tornadoes	Max rating	Peak gust	Fatalities	Outlook	Notes
April 24	2010	Southern U.S.	39	EF4	120 mph (190 km/h)^{†}	10		Tornado outbreak of April 22–25, 2010 – A high risk was issued at 06Z issued for a 30% probability of significant tornadoes. There were 39 tornadoes confirmed; two were rated EF4. One of the EF4 tornado was the second (then-first) widest in Mississippi state history, and the fourth-longest tracked in the state. The strongest tornadoes were in/near the high risk area. The high risk was discontinued at 0100Z.
April 30	2010	Arkansas	26	EF3	75 mph (121 km/h)^{†}	1		Tornado outbreak of April 30 – May 2, 2010 – A high risk was issued on the first day of the aforementioned outbreak for a 30% probability of significant tornadoes. For only the second known time a high risk was not issued until 0100 UTC (the other occurrence May 22, 2004). This is the last 01Z High Risk upgrade to date. The eventual high risk area was only in an enhanced slight risk prior to 20Z. This is the only day in which the entire area to eventually be in a high risk was not even in a moderate risk until 2000Z. There were 26 tornadoes confirmed; two were rated EF3.
May 1	2010	Middle Mississippi Valley	30	EF3	83 mph (134 km/h)^{†}	0		Tornado outbreak of April 30 – May 2, 2010 – A high risk was issued at 13Z on the second day of the aforementioned outbreak for a 30% probability of significant tornadoes, and was subsequently maintained. Only 11 weak tornadoes were confirmed during the day, but several strong tornadoes, one of which was rated EF3, occurred overnight focused on the eastern portions of the high risk area and into the bordering moderate risk. A major flood disaster also occurred from the same storm.
May 10	2010	Oklahoma, Kansas	70	EF4	100 mph (160 km/h)^{†}	3		Tornado outbreak of May 10–13, 2010 – A high risk lasted the entire outlook cycle on the first day of the aforementioned outbreak for a 30% probability of significant tornadoes. There were 70 tornadoes confirmed; two were rated EF4, both of which occurred around the west edge of the high risk in the southern suburbs of the Oklahoma City metropolitan area and were responsible for the three fatalities during the outbreak.
May 19	2010	Oklahoma	21	EF1	70 mph (110 km/h)^{†}	0		Tornadoes of 2010#May 18–21 – A high risk was issued at 1630Z on the second day of the aforementioned outbreak for a 30% probability of significant tornadoes. Overall, the event busted; only 21 weak tornadoes, seven of which were rated EF1, were confirmed; one of the tornadoes occurred in Washington. Significant flooding occurred from the same storm system. The high risk was discontinued at 01Z.
October 26	2010	Ohio, Indiana, Illinois, Michigan	43	EF2	85 mph (137 km/h)^{†}	0		October 2010 North American storm complex – This was a major derecho event. The high risk was issued at 06Z based on 60% significant severe wind probability, with a tornado probability of 15% falling short of high risk standards. There were 43 tornadoes confirmed; five were rated EF2. There were also 339 damaging wind reports including 7 hurricane-force gusts (many inside the high risk) up to 85 mph (137 km/h). The high risk was discontinued at 2000Z as the squall line was most intense in the morning and early afternoon. The storm system (nicknamed "Octbomb") responsible for this severe weather outbreak also featured near-record nontropical low pressure over Minnesota.
April 16	2011	North Carolina, Virginia	53	EF3	81 mph (130 km/h)^{†}	26		Tornado outbreak of April 14–16, 2011 – A high risk was issued at 1630Z on the third day of the aforementioned outbreak (which had already produced a substantial tornado outbreak on the prior days) for a 30% probability of significant tornadoes. A total of 58 tornadoes were confirmed; six were rated EF3, two of which had path lengths of over 50 miles (80 km) with the first striking Raleigh, North Carolina (albeit at EF1 strength). The high risk was discontinued at 0100Z as the storms had mostly moved off the East Coast.
April 26	2011	South-Central U.S.	55	EF3	110 mph (180 km/h)^{†}	0		2011 Super Outbreak – A high risk was issued at 13Z and subsequently maintained on the second day of the record-setting aforementioned outbreak for a 30% probability of significant tornadoes. In the 1630z outlook, the wind risk was also upgraded to 60%, which meets high risk criteria. There were 55 tornado touch downs during the day; one was rated EF3. 390 damaging wind gusts were also reported, including 5 hurricane gusts. Despite the abundance of tornadoes and wind reports, most of the severe activity happened either along and south of the southern part of the high-risk area or well to the east in the slight risk area over Alabama. Additionally, on the previous day (April 25, the first day of this sequence), a moderate risk was in effect simultaneously for that day (the 25th), in anticipation for this day (the 26th; Day 2 outlook), and also in anticipation for the following day (April 27; Day 3 outlook; which turned into an extremely destructive and record setting high risk day - see below). This is the only known simultaneous occurrence of Day 1, 2, and 3 moderate risk outlooks.
April 27	2011	Southern U.S.	215	EF5	100 mph (160 km/h)^{†}	316		2011 Super Outbreak – The high risk lasted the entire Day 1 Outlook cycle. This was day 3 of the record-setting aforementioned outbreak; this day alone set the record for most tornadoes in a 24-hour period. It was also the deadliest high risk day on record as well as the deadliest single day outbreak in the United States since the Tri-State tornado outbreak on March 18, 1925. The outlook included a 45% significant tornado area that was introduced at 1630Z (the first instance of a 45% tornado area being added prior to the 20Z outlook), which is above the minimum threshold for a high risk. It also produced the first known watch (PDS tornado watch 235) with a >95% probability for all severe and significant severe hazards. The tornadoes came in three rounds starting with two damaging morning squall lines followed by an outbreak of large tornadic supercells. The strongest (violent EF4/EF5) tornadoes occurred in the high risk area (many in/near the 45% probability) associated with these large supercells, while dozens of other tornadoes were confirmed throughout the other risk areas. Three of the tornadoes tracked over 100 miles (160 km), with one of them becoming the deadliest tornado ever recorded in Alabama. Several areas that had experienced tornadoes either from that morning or from other outbreaks earlier that year were struck again as well. One violent tornado struck both Tuscaloosa and Birmingham, Alabama, remaining on the ground in-between. There were 215 tornado touchdowns; four were rated EF5, the second most for a calendar day (the record is the Super Outbreak of April 3, 1974). An additional 11 EF4 tornadoes were also reported, and the total of 15 violent tornadoes (EF4+) was the third most on record, behind the 1974 Super Outbreak and the 1965 Palm Sunday outbreak (all of these numbers are the most of any day since 1982, when records of High Risk outlooks begin). An additional F0 tornado was confirmed in Canada.
May 24	2011	Oklahoma, Kansas, Texas	47	EF5	92 mph (148 km/h)^{†*}	17		Tornado outbreak sequence of May 21–26, 2011 – The high risk was issued at 06Z and discontinued at 01Z. This was day 4 of the aforementioned outbreak sequence and included a 45% significant tornado area introduced at 1630Z, above the minimum high-risk threshold. There were 47 tornado touchdowns; with the El Reno-Piedmont tornado (occurring within the high risk and 45% tornado area over Oklahoma) being rated an EF5. This EF5 occurred only two days after the devastating Joplin EF5 from the same overall storm sequence (however, a high risk outlook was not issued on May 22). Two of the three EF4 tornadoes that were confirmed that day may have also reached EF5 intensity. The high risk was discontinued at 0100Z. This is the last High Risk day as of August 2025 to produce an official EF5 tornado (however, an EF5 tornado did occur more recently in 2013 in Oklahoma on a Moderate Risk day).
May 25	2011	Midwest	94	EF3	100 mph (160 km/h)^{†}	1		Tornado outbreak sequence of May 21–26, 2011 – A high risk was issued at 13Z on the fifth day of the aforementioned outbreak sequence for a 30% probability of significant tornadoes. A total of 94 tornadoes were confirmed; two (both of which occurred inside of the high risk) were rated EF3; three of the tornadoes were in California, well to the west of the main risk area. The high-risk was discontinued at 0100Z.
March 2	2012	Midwest and Southern U.S.	64	EF4	86 mph (138 km/h)^{†}	41		Tornado outbreak of March 2–3, 2012 – A high risk was issued at 13Z on the first day of the aforementioned outbreak (but fourth day of a storm sequence that began February 28) for a 30% probability of significant tornadoes. A total of 64 tornadoes were confirmed; two were rated EF4, both of which were produced by the same supercell, which also produced an EF3 tornado, all within the high risk area. Another EF3 tornado tracked for over 80 miles (130 km) through eastern Kentucky and southwestern West Virginia. The high risk was discontinued at 0100Z.
April 14	2012	Central U.S.	83	EF4	97 mph (156 km/h)	6		Tornado outbreak of April 13–16, 2012 – This was day 2 of aforementioned outbreak; it was the second of three high risks to be issued on Day 2 (the day before the event; first Day 2 high risk was for April 7, 2006, and the third was for March 15, 2025) and the first/only to date ever issued on the initial (0600Z) Day 2 outlook. It included 45% tornado probability above minimum threshold of 30%. This was the only day to have a 45% tornado area in its 06Z Day 1 Outlook (although that 45% area was north of most of the tornadoes; by 20Z the 45% area had been shifted southward and covered the region that ultimately saw the most/densest tornado activity). A total of 83 tornadoes were confirmed; one was rated EF4. The high risk largely busted in most of Oklahoma (except far northern and western) as the brunt of outbreak was focused in Kansas. The high risk was maintained for the entire Day 1 cycle (in addition to both Day 2 outlooks) in the regions where most of the tornadoes including the strongest tornadoes occurred (the southern end of the high risk, which lacked storms due to capping until well into the night when a moderate squall line containing only a few embedded tornadoes developed along the cold front as it overtook the dryline, was trimmed back to a moderate risk at 01Z).
June 12	2013	Midwest	19	EF3	95 mph (153 km/h)^{†}	0		June 12–13, 2013 derecho series – This is the latest date of a 'spring season' high risk in the 21st century to date. The high risk was issued at 1630Z driven by 60% significant severe wind probability as the maximum tornado probability was a hatched 15% area, just short of the high risk level. (The latest spring season issuance of a 30% tornado area in the 21st century is June 7, 2007.) A total of 19 tornadoes were confirmed; one was rated EF3. 278 damaging wind gusts were reported, including 4 hurricane-force gusts, though most occurred over Ohio and were east of the high risk and near or after its 01Z discontinuation. The high risk was discontinued at 01Z.
November 17	2013	Midwest	77	EF4	100 mph (160 km/h)^{†}	8		Tornado outbreak of November 17, 2013 – The high risk was initially issued at 06Z for a 30% probability of significant tornadoes. This was an unusually far north tornado outbreak and one of only five high risk days during the month of November in recorded history (three since 2000). Many Midwest cities (including Chicago, South Bend, and Fort Wayne) outside the climatologically most frequent high risk locations experienced their second high risk day of 2013. It was the second latest date in the year a high risk has been issued since 2000 (the latest was December 23, 2002, in the Deep South), and latest date in a calendar year that a high risk has been issued in the Midwest (second latest is November 15, 2005). It also included a high risk level (60% significant severe) wind probability in the 2000Z outlook. In all, 77 tornadoes were confirmed largely in and near the high risk area; two were rated EF4, both occurring in the western portion of the high risk area. 579 wind reports were also recorded, including 19 hurricane-force. The high risk was discontinued at 0100Z as the cold front and related storms had moved eastward into the bordering moderate area (which was maintained primarily for wind). This was the last High Risk issued during the fall severe weather season for over a decade (although incidents of significant fall/early winter season tornadoes have occurred more recently).
April 27	2014	Southwestern Arkansas	18	EF4	90 mph (140 km/h)^{†}	19		Tornado outbreak and floods of April 27–30, 2014 – This was the first day of the aforementioned outbreak. A small high risk area was issued at the 2000Z outlook that included the cities of Little Rock, Camden, and Danville for a 30% probability of significant tornadoes. An EF4 tornado was confirmed in the risk area before the high risk was discontinued in a special outlook update at 0230Z. The outlook period as a whole produced 18 tornadoes.
April 28	2014	Alabama, Mississippi	57	EF4	70 mph (110 km/h)^{†}	16		Tornado outbreak and floods of April 27–30, 2014 – This was the second day of the aforementioned outbreak. A high risk was issued at the 2000Z outlook for a 30% probability of significant tornadoes. Numerous long-tracked and/or strong to violent tornadoes occurred across Mississippi, Alabama, and Tennessee. It was the largest tornado outbreak in central Alabama since April 27, 2011. A total of 57 tornadoes were confirmed during the outlook period; one was rated EF4. The strongest tornadoes were in or nearby to the high risk. This is the last occurrence of back to back high risk days for at least a decade (continuing as of early 2025; and three consecutive high risk days have not occurred in 25 years, since May 1999). The high risk was discontinued at 0100Z.
June 3	2014	Nebraska, Iowa, Missouri	9	EF3	100 mph (160 km/h)^{†}	0		Tornadoes of 2014#June 3–4 – The high risk was issued at 2000Z for 60% wind probability and potential derecho; tornado probability was 10%, well short of high risk level. Extreme hail/wind and some tornadoes were reported, although most of the activity remained along or south of the southern part of the high risk. Nine tornadoes were confirmed during the outlook period; one tornado was rated EF3. The high risk was discontinued at 0100Z. As of March 2026, this was the most recent high risk to be wind-driven with less than high risk level tornado probabilities.
January 22	2017	Georgia, Florida	17	EF3	75 mph (121 km/h)	16		Tornado outbreak of January 21–23, 2017 – An unusual January High Risk (the first since 1999) followed the longest known gap (over 30 months) between High Risk days. This was the second day of the aforementioned outbreak. The high risk was issued at 13Z for a 30% probability of significant tornadoes, primarily in northern Florida and southern Georgia. This was also the first high risk issued under the five-category system (which began in October 2014), and also the furthest southeast (Florida panhandle) a high risk has been issued in the 21st century. The outbreak failed to reach its full potential due to the warm front not going as far north as expected, but 17 confirmed tornado touchdowns did occur during the outlook period; one tornado, which was rated EF3, traveled over 70 miles (110 km) and was over a 1 mile (1.6 km) wide. There were six fatalities from tornadoes along with one non-tornadic death. The high risk was discontinued at 0100Z.
April 2	2017	Texas, Louisiana	24	EF2	70 mph (110 km/h)	2		Tornado outbreak of April 2–3, 2017 – This was the first day of the aforementioned outbreak. The high risk was issued at 1630Z for a 30% probability of significant tornadoes. Seven tornadoes that touched down during the outlook period were more than 1/2 mi (0.80 km) wide, including one that reached a peak width of just over 1 1/4 mi (2.0 km) wide, and multiple tornado emergencies were issued. There were 24 tornadoes confirmed during the outlook period; six of them were rated EF2. The high risk was discontinued at 0100Z.
April 5	2017	Georgia, South Carolina	26	EF2	80 mph (130 km/h)	0		Tornadoes of 2017#April 4–6 – This was the second day of the aforementioned outbreak. The high risk was issued at 1630Z for a 30% probability of significant tornadoes. A total of 26 tornadoes were confirmed during the outlook period, four of which were rated EF2, although the tornadoes were mostly scattered throughout the various severe risk areas rather than being concentrated within the high risk area, which had only three tornadoes. Those tornadoes were produced by a supercell that moved into high risk area and prompted the issuance of a three tornado emergencies. The high risk was discontinued at around 0100Z.
May 18	2017	Kansas, Oklahoma	58	EF2	104 mph (167 km/h)	0		Tornado outbreak sequence of May 15–20, 2017 – This was day 4 of the outbreak sequence. The high risk was issued at 06Z for a 30% probability of significant tornadoes. A total of 58 tornadoes were confirmed during the outlook period, three of which were rated EF2. However, only weak, scattered tornadoes were reported in the high risk area, which saw a large area of heavy rain when the most favorable tornado parameters arrived; the strongest tornadoes occurred to the east of that area. The high risk was discontinued at 01Z.
May 20	2019	Oklahoma, Texas	51	EF3	94 mph (151 km/h)	0		Tornado outbreak of May 20–23, 2019 – This was the first day of the aforementioned outbreak. The high risk was initially issued at 06Z for a 30% probability of significant tornadoes; this risk area was subsequently expanded and upgraded to a 45% probability of significant tornadoes, exceeding the minimum high risk criteria at the 1630Z outlook. This high risk produced the second known tornado watch with a >95% chance of all hazards (PDS Tornado Watch 199). The event did not quite live up to the high parameters that were in place for the day with sustained supercells failing to develop in the 45% risk, likely in part because of more persistent low cloud cover. However, 50 tornadoes were confirmed during the outlook period, many in/near the high risk area and one of which was rated EF3 (one of the tornadoes was also well outside of the risk area in Arizona). The high risk lasted for the entire outlook period, although the 01Z outlook had only a much smaller high risk area focusing on one lone supercell.
† – Value is estimated * – Peak wind gust of 151 mph (243 km/h) measured during the EF5 El Reno tornado

=== 2020–present ===
There were no high-risk days in 2020 or 2022. Six high risks have been issued so far in the 2020s.

Storm Prediction Center High Risk Events – 2020–2026
Date	Year	Region	Tornadoes (Note: This number reflects the number of tornadoes during the outlook period between 12Z on the day of the high risk to 12Z the next day.)	Max rating	Peak gust	Fatalities	Outlook	Notes
March 17	2021	Mississippi, Alabama, Louisiana, Arkansas	40	EF2	64 mph (103 km/h)	0		Tornado outbreak of March 16–18, 2021 – This was day 2 of the outbreak. The high risk, which lasted the entire Day 1 Outlook cycle, was initially issued for a 30% hatched area for tornadoes; this was upgraded to a 45% hatched area for tornadoes at 1606Z. A total of 40 tornadoes were confirmed during the outlook period, four of which were rated EF2, although little tornado activity occurred within the 45% risk area.
March 25	2021	Mississippi, Alabama, Tennessee	20	EF4	105 mph (169 km/h)	6		Tornado outbreak sequence of March 24–28, 2021 – This was day 2 of the outbreak sequence. The high risk was issued at 06Z for a 30% hatched area for tornadoes. A PDS tornado watch was issued, with a >95% chance for both tornadoes and strong tornadoes, and high probabilities for most other categories. Multiple tornado emergencies were issued for three different tornadoes with multiple large, long-tracked EF3 tornadoes being confirmed in Alabama. The high risk was discontinued at 01z and downgraded to an enhanced risk as the storm system began weakening and the supercells began dying off, although the strongest tornado, which was rated EF4, took place a few hours after that time, and was east of where the high risk had been in place in earlier outlooks. A total of 20 tornadoes were confirmed during the outlook period.
March 31	2023	Upper and Lower Mississippi Valleys	134	EF4	85 mph (137 km/h)	25		Tornado outbreak of March 31 – April 1, 2023 – Two high risk zones were issued at 1630Z with 30% hatched areas for tornadoes. The northern of the two zones was discontinued at 01Z, whereas the southern zone was subsequently maintained. Multiple tornado emergencies and mass casualty events were issued during the outbreak. A total of 134 tornadoes were confirmed during the outlook period, one of which was rated EF4 and occurred in the northern high risk area prior to its 01Z removal. This was the first instance of two separate high risk areas since the initial 06Z outlook on April 14, 2012, and the first time in the 21st century in which the 1630Z and 20Z outlooks had separate high risk zones. This was also the deadliest high risk day since March 2, 2012.
May 6	2024	Oklahoma, Kansas	58	EF4	82 mph (132 km/h)	2		Tornado outbreak of May 6–10, 2024 – A high risk zone was issued at the 13Z outlook and subsequently maintained for a 30% hatched area for tornadoes. 58 tornadoes were confirmed during the outlook period, including a violent EF4 tornado that struck Barnsdall and Bartlesville, Oklahoma after dark, occurring within the high risk area in the 01Z outlook update and killing two people. However, all but one of the other tornadoes (which was rated EF2) were weak, and the southern portion of the high risk generally lacked tornado reports.
March 15	2025	Mississippi, Alabama	41	EF4	95 mph (153 km/h)	11		Tornado outbreak of March 14–16, 2025 – A high risk was issued in the 1730Z Day 2 convective outlook, with a 30% risk for significant tornadoes. It was only the third ever issuance of a Day 2 high risk in SPC history, and the first since April 14, 2012. This is also the first Day 2 high risk under the five category outlook system, which began in October 2014, as well as the first Day 2 high risk since Day 2 individual hazard probability graphics began in January 2020. The high risk area was expanded slightly for the 0600 UTC Day 1 Outlook issuance, with a continued focus on a 30% hatched (significant) area for tornadoes. Before the tornado outbreak started, two PDS Tornado watches were issued and both had >95% probability for both tornadoes, and strong tornadoes. Multiple intense tornadoes occurred in the High Risk area, particularly across southern Mississippi. This included an EF4 tornado that struck the northwestern portion of Walthall County, Mississippi near Tylertown, Mississippi. In all, 41 tornadoes occurred during the outbreak period. The high risk was discontinued at 0100 UTC update.
April 2	2025	Arkansas, Mississippi, Tennessee, Missouri, Illinois, Kentucky	93	EF3	100 mph (160 km/h)	7		Tornado outbreak and floods of April 2–7, 2025 – A high risk was issued in the 0600Z Day 1 convective outlook, with a 30% risk for significant tornadoes. The high risk would be expanded southwestward in the 13Z outlook update. Widespread intense severe thunderstorms occurred across the high risk area. Numerous tornado warnings, including several PDS tornado warnings and two tornado emergencies were issued. The high risk was maintained throughout the entire outlook cycle with 93 tornadoes touching down during that time, six of which were rated EF3. This was the final high risk issued prior to the new categorical outlook system that the SPC began to use in March 2026.

== See also ==
- List of Storm Prediction Center extremely critical days
- List of tornado emergencies
