= Storm Riders =

Storm Riders may refer to:

- The Storm Rider, a 1957 American Western film
- The Grand Duel, also known as Storm Rider, a 1972 Spaghetti Western film
- Storm Riders (1982 film), a documentary featuring surfers and windsurfers
- Storm Riders (module), 1990 adventure module
- The Storm Riders, a 1998 Hong Kong film based on a comic book called Fung Wan
- Storm Rider (2013 film), an American family drama film starring Kevin Sorbo
- Storm Riders, 2019 South African movie.
- Storm Rider (G.I. Joe)
- Storm Riders (TV series), program on The Weather Channel

== See also ==
- "Riders on the Storm", a song by The Doors on their 1971 album, L.A. Woman
