= Middle States =

Middle States may refer to:

- Middle States Association of Colleges and Schools
- Mid-Atlantic (United States)
- Midwestern United States

== See also ==
- Great Plains
- Central United States
