= Sammy Chand =

- Born: Sammy Chand; March 19, 1975 (age 50)
- Occupations: Artist, Songwriter, Record Producer, Owner, CEO
- Instruments: Vocals, keyboards, sampler, percussion, synthesizer
- Years active: 1996–present
- Labels: Rukus Avenue
- Website: rukusavenue.com

Sammy Chand is a record producer, soundtrack composer, artist, and entrepreneur. He is also the founder of Rukus Avenue, a South Asian record label based in Los Angeles, CA.

== Career ==
Sammy has transformed both the musical landscape and the South Asian community with a storied career spanning over two decades. In 1996, he laid the foundation for Rukus Avenue, as an independent record label and platform for an emerging scene of South Asian musicians in North America. This seminal company was at the forefront of a community-driven movement to establish a new identity for South-Asian Americans, that were charged with the task of reconciling traditional cultural values with American ones. Chand had made a name for himself in the world of film and television through a lengthy list of placements. Under his leadership, the label gained an international presence, beginning with a landmark distribution deal with Sony Music in India and a more recent global agreement with The Orchard.

Early releases such as Passage to India (Various, 2001) and The Movement (Karmacy, 2005), helped to cement Chand's status as dynamic music producer and cultural ambassador. His solo debut, Tale of a Crown (2010) further demonstrates his ability to pair original musical elements found in South Asian music with a variety of other genres - a Chand signature.

Throughout his career, Chand and his music have built a formidable bond with the film and television community. His notable placements include CBS News, PBS, The Oprah Winfrey Show, America's Most Wanted, Leela, So You Think You Can Dance?, Anthony Bourdain's No Reservations and the Weather Channel's Storm Riders. In 2008, he partnered with the Indian Film Festival of Los Angeles to bring a live musical component to the festival that would properly articulate the intimate relationship between music and film in Indian Cinema. The IFFLA Rhythm Village and IFFLA Rhythm Village Unplugged under his direction, have become highly popular additions to the annual festival.

Today, Chand is further advancing this movement and his sound with the third generation of Rukus Avenue artists. He is currently producing the debut from Elephants With Guns, an eclectic band that, “collects music, sounds and noises from different parts of the world, wraps them in twine, and presents them to you.” He is also currently writing and recording material for Blood and Treasure, the follow-up to Tale of a Crown. Chand currently resides in Los Angeles.

== Discography ==
=== Solo albums ===
- Passage to India (2001)
- Tale of a Crown (2010)

=== Collaborations ===
- Karmacy - The Movement (2005)
- Rasika - Sari (W)rap (2010)

=== Music Placements ===
- The Oprah Winfrey Show (ABC)
- America's Most Wanted - multiple (FOX)
- So You Think You Can Dance (FOX)
- Fetch! With Ruffman Ruff (Fox)
- CBS News
- No Reservations With Anthony Bourdain (travel)
- PBS Newshour
- Bizarre Foods (travel)
- Cupcake Wars (food)
- CMJ New Music CD
- NBA/ India day Los Angeles Clippers Campaign
- PETA India Campaign
- Talking heads - (ABC)Australia
- Steven and Chris - Canada
- Ne Dites Pas A Mere - multiple- France
- People's Du Feu Philippines - France
- Alberta Primetime - Canada
- E! Talk - Canada
- Sentinelles De La Nature - France
- Living Halifax, Toronto, Saskatchewan, Vancouver - Canada
- Delhi Daka - France
- Storm Riders - (Weather Channel)
- Haravak Aruts - Israel
- Hisardut Haphilipinim - Israel
- Travels to the Edge with Art W - Canada
- Frat Party - movie
- American Desi - movie
- American Chai - movie
- Bride and Prejudice - movie
- Leela - movie
- Wheres the party yaar - movie
- NBC summer Olympics Commercials 2004
- Friday Night Lights (NBC)
- Quarter Life Crisis - movie
- Universal Music Urban Fusion
- Current TV
- Bellytwins Bollywood DVD workout
- Bellytwins Bhangra DVD workout
- Virgin Airlines inflight music
- KTLA Morning News
