= Tornado outbreak sequence of May 2004 =

Series of tornados in North America

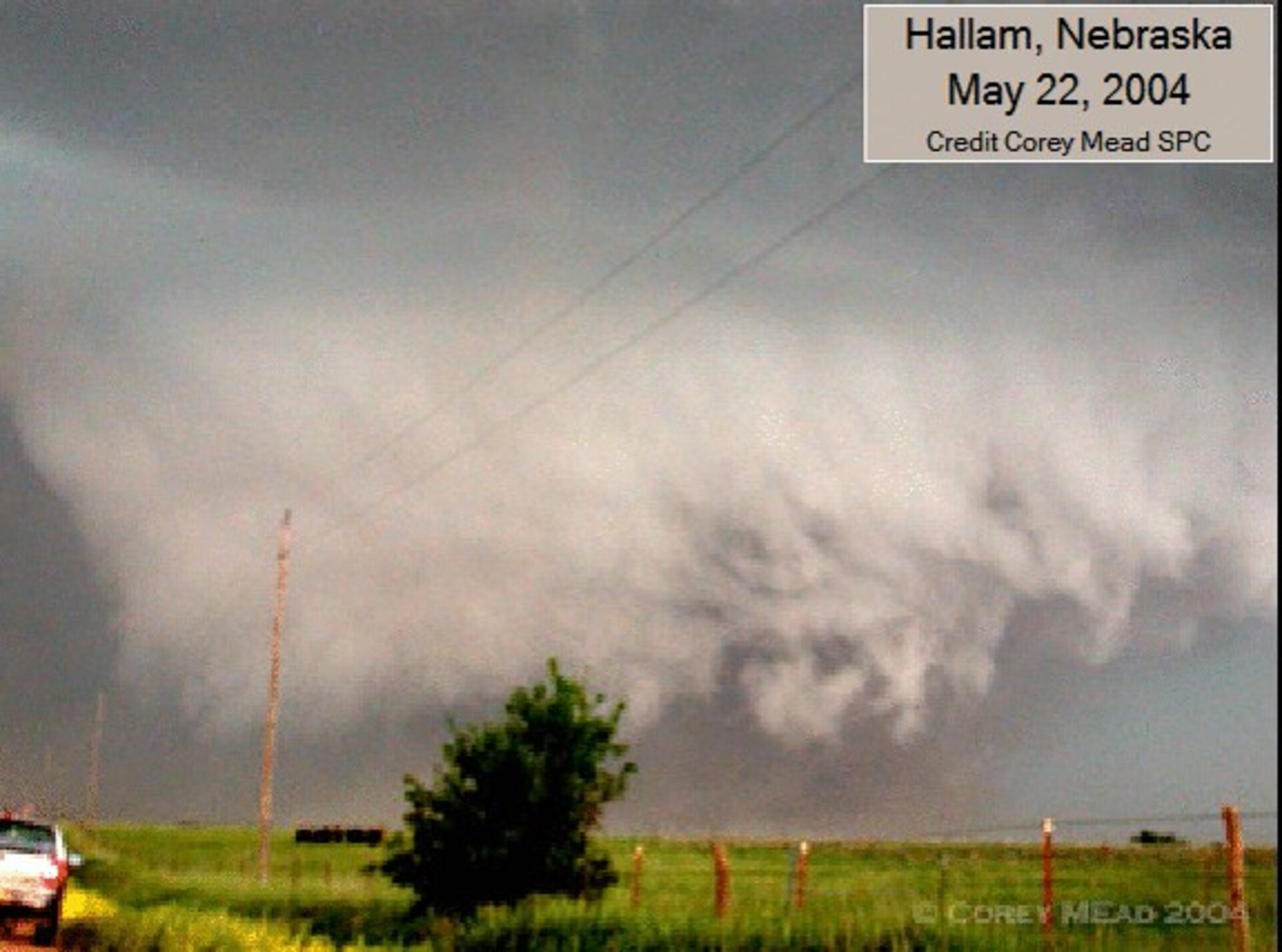
- The Hallam, Nebraska F4 near the town of Western, Nebraska.

Meteorological history
- Duration: May 21, 2004 – May 31, 2004

Tornado outbreak
- Tornadoes: 389 (33 significant)
- Max. rating: F4 tornado
- Duration: 11 days
- Highest winds: 207–260 mph (333–418 km/h) (Hallam, Nebraska F4 on May 22 & Weatherby, Missouri F4 on May 29)

Overall effects
- Fatalities: 7
- Injuries: 123
- Damage: $175 million (May 22) $65 million (May 29–31)
- Areas affected: Central, Southern, and Eastern United States, Ontario
- Part of the tornado outbreaks of 2004

The tornado outbreak sequence of May 2004 was a series of tornado outbreaks that affected much of southern Ontario, Canada, the Central and Southern United States from east of the Rockies to the Mid-Atlantic States from May 21 to May 31, 2004. Particularly hard hit were the central Plains from Missouri to Iowa and the Ohio Valley. The Central Plains were hit by two significant outbreaks on May 22 and May 24, the first outbreak of which produced a very large and violent F4 tornado in Hallam, Nebraska on May 22. The Ohio Valley was affected by one of the largest tornado outbreaks ever during the Memorial Day weekend on May 29–30.

Seven people were killed in four states during the entire event. In all, 389 tornadoes were confirmed over an 11-day period – close to the number of tornadoes in the May 2003 tornado outbreak sequence which affected more or less the same area. However, the 2003 outbreak sequence produced several more destructive and violent tornadoes and had a much higher death toll than in May 2004.

== Confirmed tornadoes ==
Confirmed tornadoes by Fujita rating
FU	F0	F1	F2	F3	F4	F5	Total
0	241	115	23	8	2	0	389

=== Wilber–Clatonia–Hallam–Bennet, Nebraska ===
Wilber–Clatonia–Hallam–Bennet, Nebraska
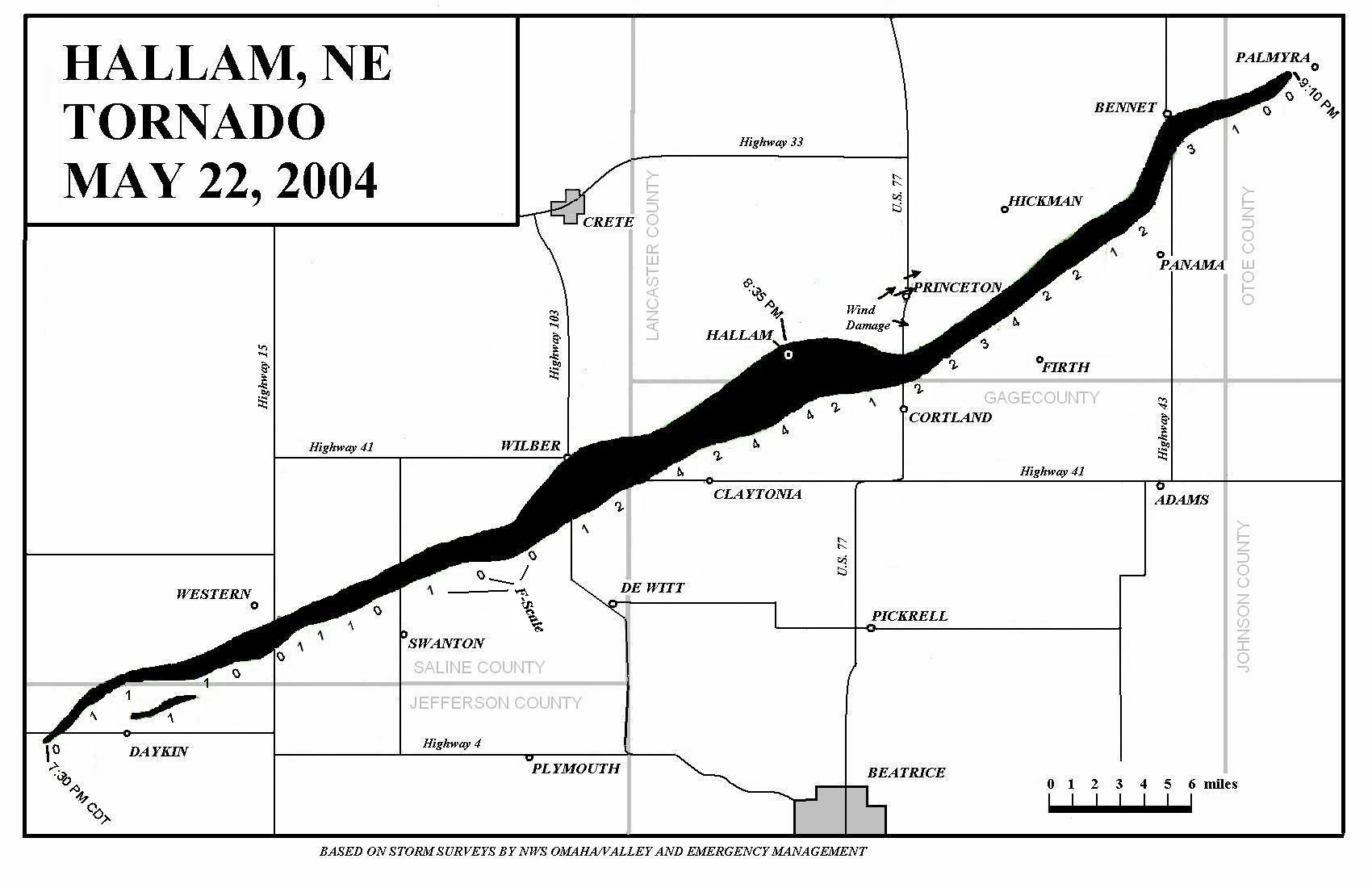
- Track of the tornado.

Meteorological history
- Formed: May 22, 2004; 7:30 PM CDT (UTC-5:00)
- Dissipated: May 22, 2004; 9:10 PM CDT (UTC-5:00)
- Duration: 1 hour, 40 minutes

F4 tornado
- on the Fujita scale
- Highest winds: 207–260 mph (333–418 km/h)

Overall effects
- Fatalities: 1
- Injuries: 38
- Damage: $160 million (2004 USD)

This enormous, long-tracked (Note: Long-track is defined as traversing 30–60 miles (48–97 km) or more.) and powerful F4 tornado began southwest of Daykin at 7:30 PM CDT (12:30 UTC) in northwestern Jefferson County. Here, the tornado caused F1 damage to several farm silos, grain bins and trees. 5 minutes later, an F0 satellite tornado occurred over to the east of Daykin. After entering Saline County, near Western, the storm widened quickly into a large wedge-shaped tornado as it caused spots of isolated F0-F1 damage between Western and beyond Swanton to the northeast. Thereafter, the tornado impacted the southern side of Wilber, causing F2 roof damage to many homes before continuing to the northeast. Eight people were injured in Saline County.

Making its way into Gage County, the tornado grew to 2,640 yd (1.50 mi; 2.41 km) wide and became violent. Northwest of Clatonia, the tornado caused F4 damage to several residences and farmhouses as it made its way through the northern parts of Gage County. 20 minutes after, the tornado crossed over into Lancaster County, just south of the proper Lincoln metropolitan area whilst maintaining its strength. The tornado at the same time widened to at the time, a world-record 4,400 yd (2.5 mi; 4.0 km) wide as it encroached on Hallam. The village was completely engulfed by the violent tornado, with 95% of all structures damaged or destroyed. Hallam though, was spared by the worst of the tornado's winds as the main core passed just south of the community. One woman was killed and many were injured.

Continuing to the northeast, the tornado decreased in width and power, inflicting F2 damage north of Cortland. Near Firth, the tornado caused severe damage to Norris School District 160, with several busses hurled around and most of the exterior walls collapsed. Up ahead, F4 damage once again appeared as more rural homes and farmsteads were impacted. Heading towards Holland, the tornado weakened in intensity as it inflicted F2 damage north of Panama. The storm then abruptly headed north towards Bennet, scraping the south side of the village and causing F3 damage, before heading east and moving into Otoe County, injuring 30 people across Lancaster County. After a few minutes, the tornado dissipated southwest of Palmyra at 9:10 PM CDT (02:10 UTC) after being on the ground for 100 minutes.

The Hallam tornado is recognized by the National Oceanic and Atmospheric Administration as the second widest tornado in American history. It stands behind the 2013 El Reno tornado in Oklahoma, but ahead of the 2020 Bassfield–Soso tornado in Mississippi.

=== Memorial Weekend outbreak ===
The 2004 Memorial Day Weekend tornado outbreak was the largest continuous tornado outbreak ever recorded in the month of May. It lasted for two days from May 29–30, with the final tornadoes occurring during the early morning hours of May 31. This tornado outbreak began in the Great Plains and continued throughout the Midwest. Tornadoes on the 29th were focused from the Dakotas to Missouri and Oklahoma before shifting east to the Mississippi, Ohio and Tennessee Valleys on the 30th.

The official Storm Data archives from NOAA list a total of 168 tornadoes during the two-day period. Unofficial storm reports compiled by the Storm Prediction Center indicated 199 tornadoes, but these reports are strictly preliminary and are not quality controlled to the degree of Storm Data publications.

The 168 tornadoes occurred in 32 hours of continuous activity, which would not at all break the record held by the 1974 Super Outbreak, which saw 148 tornadoes in 18 hours. There was also a greater number of large and violent tornadoes in the Super Outbreak event. Most of the tornadoes were produced by supercells, though a few were produced by the following squall line. There were also widespread wind damage reports from a large squall line that moved through after the tornadoes. Damage totals from this outbreak are at $62.321 million.

The tornado outbreak killed at least 5 people across two states including 4 in Missouri and 1 in Indiana. 3 of the fatalities were caused by an F4 tornado that struck the Weatherby area in DeKalb County, Missouri late during the evening of May 29. Another person was killed in the St. Louis Metropolitan area while the fifth fatality was northwest of Louisville, Kentucky in the Marengo area where 80% of the town was damaged or destroyed.

In addition, an F2 tornado on May 30 affected portions of the Indianapolis Metropolitan Area just a few hours after the Indianapolis 500 was taking place. The tornado missed the Indianapolis Motor Speedway by six miles and forced post-racing events to be held indoors. The tornado did however cause extensive damage across southern and eastern Marion County south of the downtown area. While 26 people were injured, over 700 structures were damaged by the storm.

=== Other outbreaks ===
Outbreak death toll
State	Total	County	County total
Illinois	1	Scott	1
Indiana	1	Crawford	1
Missouri	4	De Kalb	3
Missouri	4	St. Louis	1
Nebraska	1	Lancaster	1
Totals	7		
All deaths were tornado-related

Several other smaller tornado outbreaks took place between May 21 to May 31, 2004, and affected many of the regions impacted by the two main outbreaks. On May 21, a series of tornadoes hit Iowa causing major damage to the town of Bradgate where 75% of the buildings were either damaged or destroyed. On this day, several clusters of thunderstorms traveled from the Midwest to the Mid-Atlantic States producing widespread damaging wind and weaker tornadoes across Michigan.

On May 24, several tornadoes touched down across the Great Plains and the Mid-Mississippi Valley. Most tornadoes were weak although one person was killed in Illinois inside a mobile home.

On May 26–27, several tornadoes affected portions of the Ohio Valley. One tornado north of Louisville producing significant damage in Washington and Clark Counties. An F3 tornado tore through a residential subdivision just north of Lexington, Kentucky causing major damage to about 50 homes.

== See also ==
- List of North American tornadoes and tornado outbreaks
- List of Canadian tornadoes and tornado outbreaks (since 2001)
