= 2004 Hallam tornado =

Massive 2004 F4 tornado in Nebraska, USA

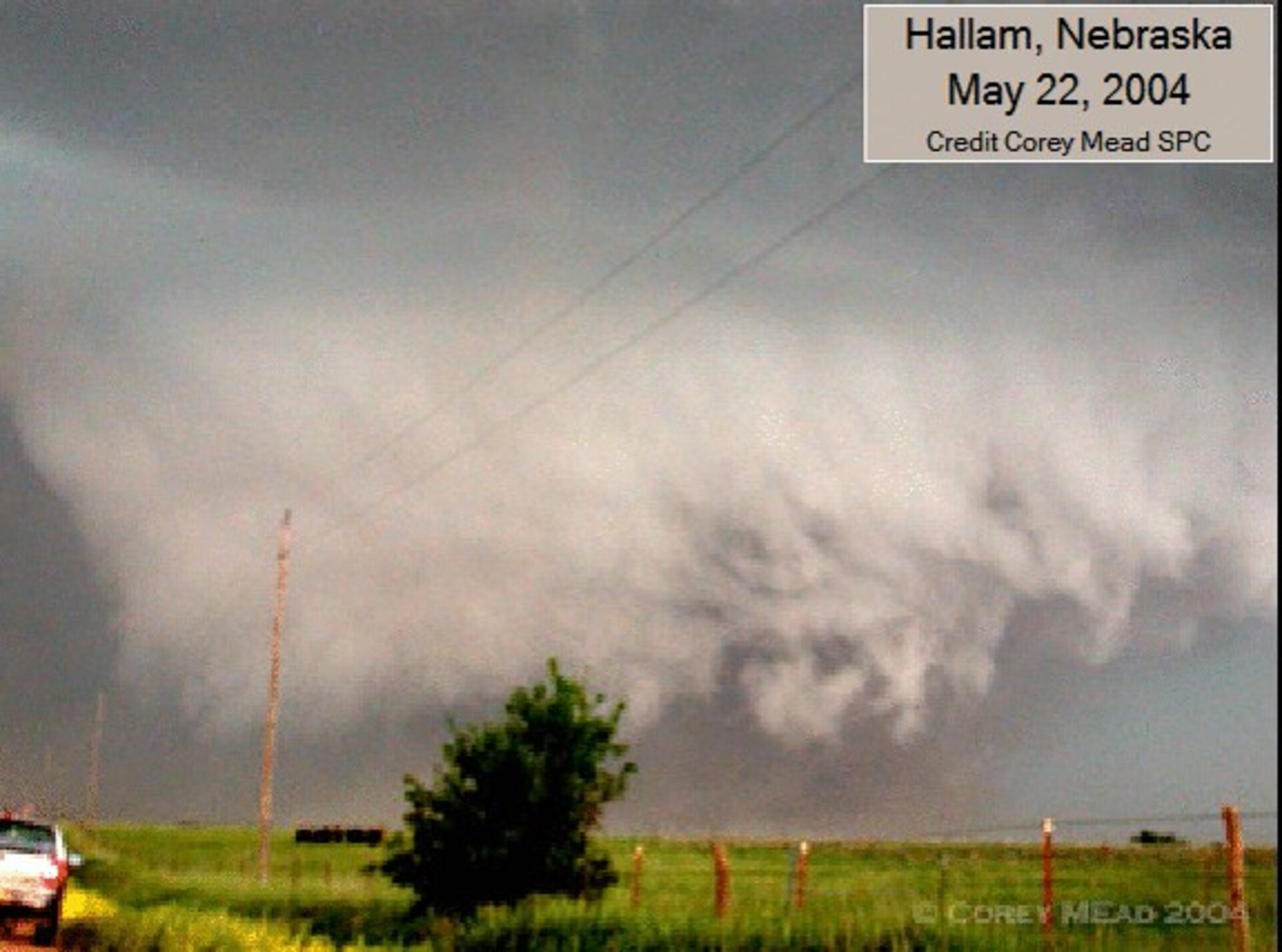
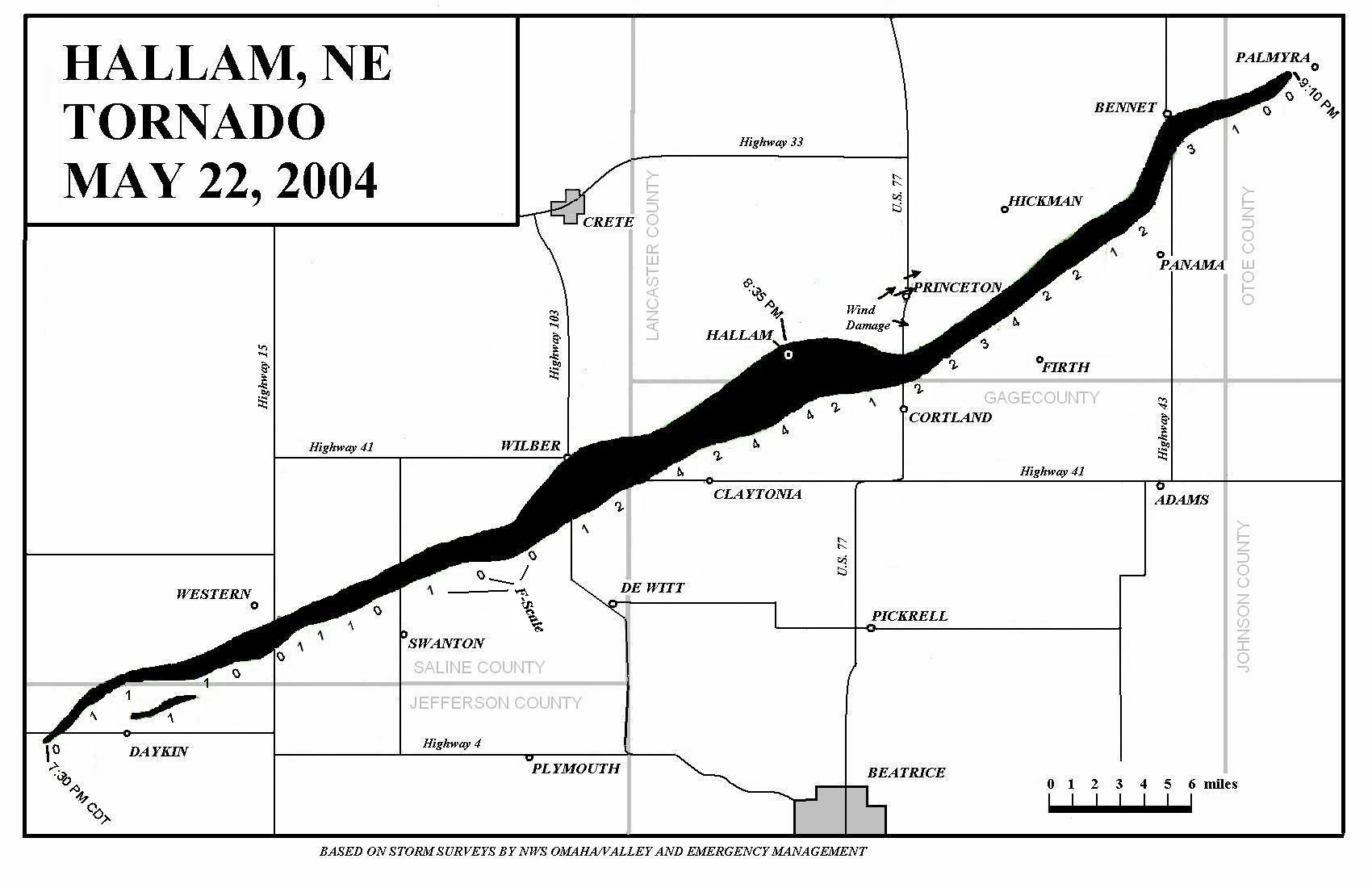
- Clockwise from top: The large and dusty wedge tornado seen near Western, a map and tornado track made by the National Oceanic and Atmospheric Administration (NOAA), a Next-Generation Radar (NEXRAD) loop of the F4 tornado.

Meteorological history
- Formed: May 22, 2004; 7:30 PM CDT (UTC-5:00)
- Dissipated: May 22, 2004; 9:10 PM CDT (UTC-5:00)
- Duration: 1 hour, 40 minutes

F4 tornado
- on the Fujita scale
- Max width: 4,400 yards (2.5 mi; 4.0 km)
- Path length: 54 miles (87 km)
- Highest winds: 207–260 mph (333–418 km/h)

Overall effects
- Fatalities: 1
- Injuries: 38
- Damage: $160 million (2004 USD)
- Areas affected: Jefferson, Saline, Gage, Lancaster and Otoe Counties; primarily in or around Daykin, Western, Wilber, Clatonia, Hallam, Firth, Holland and Bennet, Nebraska, United States
- Part of the Tornado outbreak sequence of May 2004 and tornado outbreaks of 2004

Around dusk and into the evening hours of May 22, 2004, a massive, powerful and long-tracked (Note: Long-track is defined as traversing 30–60 miles (48–97 km) or more.) F4 tornado tore across the southeastern portions of the U.S. state of Nebraska. The tornado, part of a multi-day severe weather sequence throughout late-May, damaged or destroyed many rural farmsteads and communities along its path, but its most destructive effect occurred within the village of Hallam, where nearly most of the community was severely damaged.

The Hallam tornado is recognized by the National Oceanic and Atmospheric Administration (NOAA) as the second-largest tornado on record, peaking at 4,400 yards (2.5 mi; 4.0 km) wide, behind only the 2013 El Reno tornado. The tornado holds the record as the largest by size in Nebraska's history. (Note: Both sources do not directly mention the tornado itself being exclusively the widest ever recorded in Nebraska.) Approximately 38 people were injured and one fatality occurred. The tornado caused $160 million (2004 USD) in damages along its 54 mi (87 km) path.

== Meteorological synopsis ==
=== Episode narrative ===
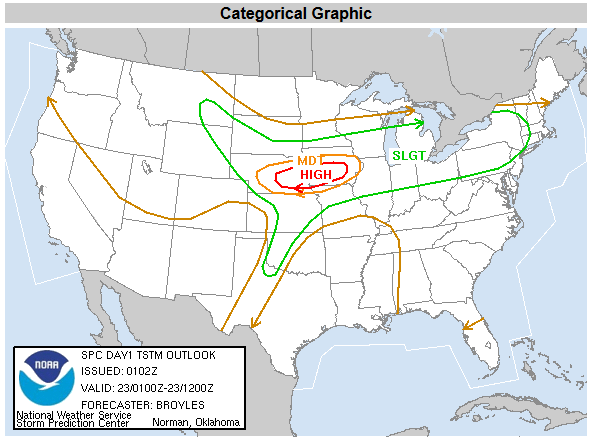
SPC high risk outlook issued for May 22, 2004 around 8:00 PM CDT (01:00 UTC).

One day prior at approximately 8:00 PM CDT (01:00 UTC) on May 21, the NOAA Storm Prediction Center (SPC) in Norman, Oklahoma issued a level 4/5 "moderate risk" for severe thunderstorms, which extended from extreme southeastern South Dakota, northern Iowa and Illinois, southern Wisconsin and extreme northwestern Indiana. Across a large swath of area within the continental United States, high instability kept feeding into a frontal boundary from the central Great Plains, all the way to most of the Corn Belt region. Two distinctive, and powerful mesoscale convective complexes were ongoing along the frontal boundary over northern Illinois to southern Michigan, while the other was situated west across north-central Iowa. The high abundance of instability and wind shear affected these ongoing storms, continuing to cause large hail, damaging winds and a few tornadoes.

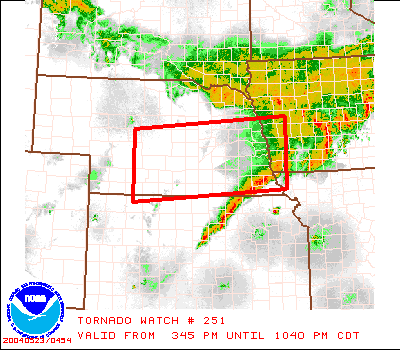
A particularly dangerous situation (PDS) tornado watch issued around 3:45 PM CDT (20:45 UTC).

The next morning at 1:00 AM CDT (06:00 UTC) on May 22, the SPC adjusted the moderate risk to be located from west-central Nebraska to most of central to northeastern Iowa. A belt of warm west-southwesterly mid-level winds from the High Plains persisted to support very steep lapse rates along the frontal boundary, while at the same time continued low-level moisture was favorably transported across the entire length of the boundary. Within the central Great Plains, potent Mixed Layer Convective Available Potential Energy (MLCAPE) levels of 4000 J/KG were forecasted to expand from Kansas to eastern Nebraska, but also western Iowa. This very unstable airmass was expected to remain sealed due to a capping inversion until the afternoon hours over most of Kansas. A combination of forcing and heating along the boundary, plus the weakening convective inhibition, resulted in rapid storm formations over Nebraska and northwestern Kansas. Deep shear was adequate for supercell structure, while robust low-level storm relative helicity was favorable for rotation as the cells moved eastward. The tornado potential was maximized in the vicinity of the a developing surface low-pressure area, near the dry line and warm front intersection over south-central Nebraska at late noon. Atmospheric soundings launched from weather balloons showed that numerous supercells with tornadoes would track northeastward across the Missouri River Valley later in the day. By 8:00 AM CDT (13:00 UTC), a 15% risk for tornadoes spanned from the Kearney, Nebraska region, all the way to areas west of the Des Moines, Iowa metro area. The greatest threat for tornadoes, some expected to be strong, were in the vicinity of the frontal boundary and gust front which were overlapping the highest tornado risk zone.

=== Event narrative ===
Onward from 3:00 PM CDT (20:00 UTC), the SPC issued a "hatched risk" within the main target area in southeastern Nebraska and southwestern Iowa, citing for development of cells in Colorado and Wyoming into a sub-synoptic low-pressure area that was wrapping the dew points in the 50° degree Fahrenheit (10° Celsius) range along the Kansas–Nebraska border. 45 minutes after the 20z outlook, a PDS tornado watch was issued spanning from extreme northern Kansas, central to eastern Nebraska, and southwest Iowa. Later, amid the ongoing tornado outbreak and Hallam tornado, at 8:00 PM CDT (01:00 UTC) the SPC issued a level 5/5 "high risk" and 25% hatched risk for tornadoes for eastern Nebraska and central Iowa due to the presence of these dangerous storms.

== Tornado summary ==
=== Jefferson and Saline Counties ===
Prior to the initial beginning of the then record-breaking Hallam tornado, the National Weather Service in Omaha, Nebraska issued a tornado warning at 7:19 PM CDT (12:19 UTC) for the area. At 7:30 PM CDT (12:30 UTC) or 11 minutes later, the Hallam tornado touched down to the southwest of Daykin, in northwestern Jefferson County, Nebraska. Throughout its 4 mi (6.4 km) track within the county, F1 damage was observed by the tornado as it damaged several silos, grain bins and trees. (Note: See [3] "Nebraska Event Report: F1 Tornado in Jefferson County") While the main tornado was ongoing, an F0 satellite tornado briefly occurred at 7:35 PM CDT (12:35 UTC) to the east of Daykin. The storm then left Jefferson County for Saline County at 7:38 PM CDT (12:38 UTC) to the southwest of Western. The tornado, upon its entrance began heading more northeasterly, while widening to 1,200 yd (0.68 mi; 1.1 km) across. F0-F1 damage was noted to occur as the tornado also passed north of Swanton, before it struck the southern side of Wilber at F2 intensity where homes had their roofs blown off on the southeast side. (Note: See [3] "Nebraska Event Report: F2 Tornado in Saline County")

=== Gage and Lancaster Counties ===
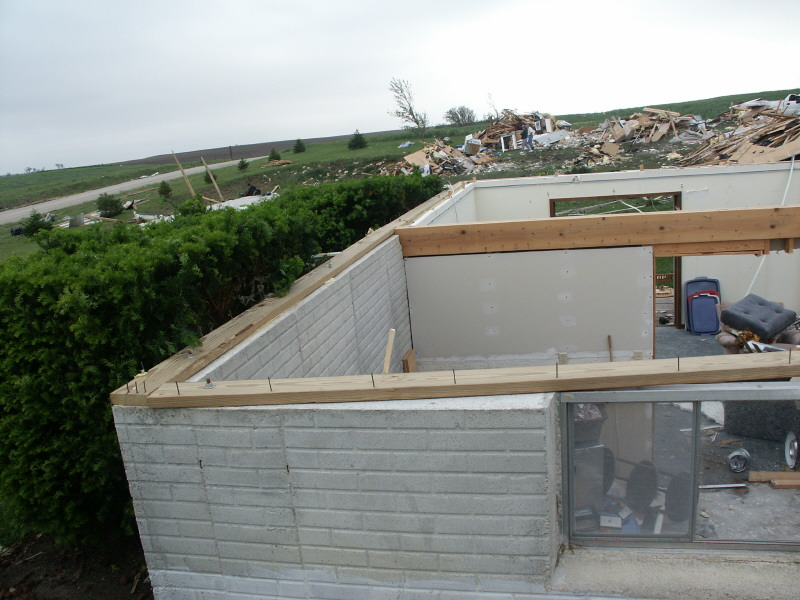
A home near Hallam swept away at F4 intensity.

The National Weather Service in Omaha issued another tornado warning across this point, at 8:09 PM CDT (01:09 UTC). One minute later, the now massive tornado grew to 2,640 yd (1.50 mi; 2.41 km) as it made its way into Gage County at 8:10 PM CDT (01:10 UTC) to the west of Clatonia. At the same time, the tornado intensified to violent status, inflicting F4 damage as struck many rural homes and farmsteads northwest of Clatonia, and the northern extent of Gage County. (Note: See [3] "Nebraska Event Report: F4 Tornado in Gage County") After traveling for 20 minutes within the previous county, around 8:30 PM CDT (01:30 UTC) the enormous and violent tornado crossed over into Lancaster County, maintaining F4 intensity and growing to its peak width of 4,400 yd (2.5 mi; 4.0 km) wide. Thereafter, the storm impacted Hallam, causing very widespread damage throughout the village and destroying farming equipment as well. 95% of Hallam was damaged or destroyed and 55 railroad cars from a train were derailed in town. Many people were injured and one person was killed in this area. Hallam though, was spared from the worst of the winds, as the tornado's core passed just to the south. (Note: See [3] "Nebraska Event Report: F4 Tornado in Lancaster County")

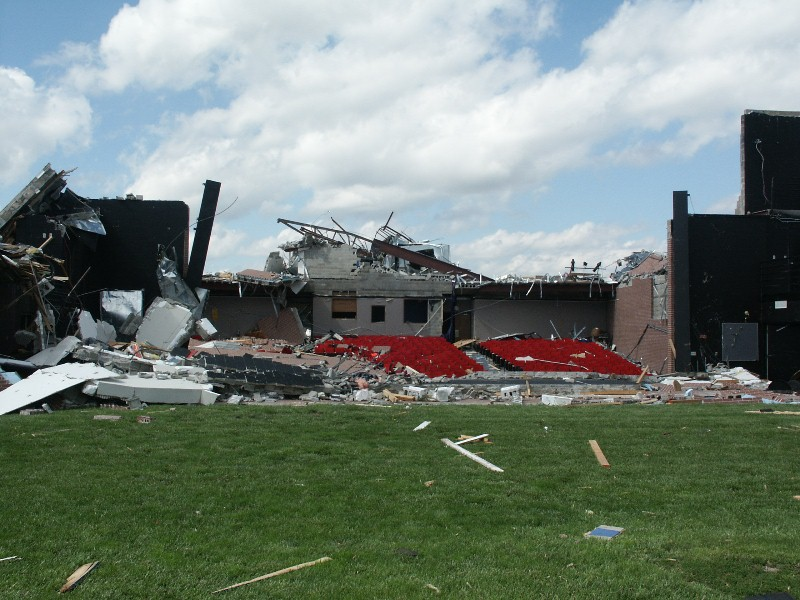
Damage to School District #160 to the northwest of Firth.

From the community and onwards, the tornado headed towards the east before turning northeast as it went north of Cortland, drastically decreasing in width and inflicting F2 damage in the area. Tracking 2 mi (3.2 km) near Firth, the tornado impacted the Norris High School, tossing several school busses around and damaging most of the exterior. Northeast of the school, the tornado intensified to violent status yet again as isolated residences and farmhouses were struck at F4 intensity. The storm's damage path continued but weakened to F2 strength towards Holland and 2 mi (3.2 km) north of Panama. The tornado then curved more northwards, becoming intense as it scraped the south side of Bennet at F3 intensity with a few houses impacted here.

=== Dissipation in Otoe County ===
The tornado changed in direction yet again to the northeast, after passing by Bennet. The tornado entered neighboring Otoe County at 9:05 PM CDT (02:05 UTC), once more having been issued another tornado warning though the storm was decreasing in intensity. The weakening vortex continued onwards as it approached Palmyra from the southwest. After being on the ground for 1 hour and 40 minutes, the tornado dissipated at 9:10 PM CDT (02:10 UTC) just 1 mi (1.6 km) southwest of Palmyra, prior to making a direct impact. (Note: See [3] "Nebraska Event Report: F1 Tornado in Otoe County")

== Tornado feats ==
=== Width record ===
The 2004 Hallam tornado became the widest tornado ever in modern United States history at the time, growing to a diameter of 4,400 yards (2.5 mi; 4.0 km) wide in Lancaster County according to the National Centers for Environmental Information. It held the record for more than nine years, until the May 31, 2013 El Reno EF3 tornado in central Oklahoma, which was slightly larger at 4,576 yards (2.600 mi; 4.184 km) wide. In 2016, another massive EF4 tornado struck China's Jiangsu province with a similar but marginally wider width to the Hallam tornado, at 2.55 miles (4.10 km) wide.

Since then, the Hallam tornado is listed at second place for largest U.S. tornadoes. The F4-rated storm ranked behind the previously mentioned 2013 El Reno, Oklahoma tornado. At third place behind the Hallam tornado was an enormous EF4 tornado that struck Bassfield and Soso, across southeast Mississippi, on April 12, 2020.

=== Other statistics ===
The Hallam tornado aside from its 4,400 yd (2.5 mi; 4.0 km) wide path width statistics, tracked for 54 miles (87 km) and lasted 100 minutes across Jefferson, Saline, Gage, Lancaster and Otoe Counties in southeast Nebraska, including the Lincoln metro area. The tornado was part of a massive and long-lasting sequence of severe weather outbreaks from May 21–31, 2004.

== Aftermath ==
=== Casualties and damage ===
An estimated 38 people were injured by the tornado, with eight reported from Saline County, while the remainder and lone death were from Lancaster County. The deceased person was identified as 73-year old Elaine A. Focken, who was struck by flying debris after trying to head to the basement of her home in Hallam.

An aerial view of Hallam after the tornado.

The tornado caused approximately $160 million (2004 USD) in damages throughout its near 55 mi (89 km) track. Hallam was the most heavily impacted area, as it was for 95% damaged by the tornado. 158 homes were destroyed, while 57 were damaged in the area. A coal train in town was tossed from its track as well by the tornado.

=== Recovery efforts ===
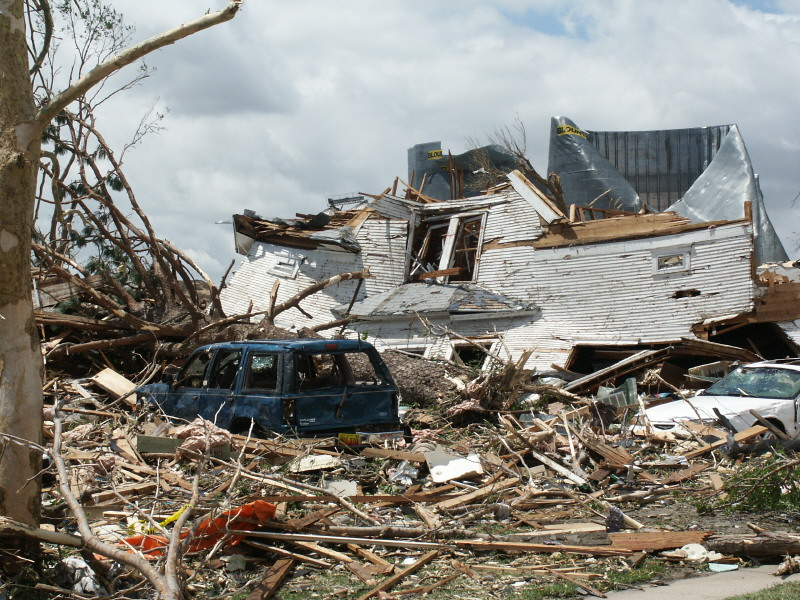
Destruction the tornado left behind in Hallam.

Former Nebraska governor Michael Johanns visited Hallam, to tour the damage the tornado left behind the day after on May 23. “It looked like it just settled down on Hallam and just beat that community. And there just isn’t a lot left,” Johanns stated after seeing the devastation in the village. The governor later issued an emergency declaration for the state of Nebraska following the tornadoes. On May 25, the Federal Emergency Management Agency (FEMA) under former U.S. president George W. Bush, declared certain parts of Nebraska, where Hallam also fell under, a major disaster area and eligible for FEMA's Individual Assistance program.

Seventy residents of Hallam moved out of the community following the tornado. In 2017, Hallam has since recovered over a decade later and slowly has been rebuilding its damaged structures, assisted by agencies and volunteers. At the same time, new residents started coming into the thriving community. The Norris High School, which was damaged and closed for the summer of 2004, was rebuilt and reopened during the 2006-2007 schoolyear.

== See also ==
- Weather of 2004
- Tornadoes of 2004
- Tornado records
- List of North American tornadoes and tornado outbreaks
- List of F4 and EF4 tornadoes
  - List of F4 and EF4 tornadoes (2000–2009)
