= Storm Riders (1982 film) =

- Directed by: David Lourie; Dick Hoole; Jack McCoy
- Starring: Wayne 'Rabbit' Bartholomew; Gerry Lopez; Mark Richards
- Release date: 1982
- Running time: 90 minutes
- Country: Australia
- Language: English

Storm Riders is a 1982 film by David Lourie, Jack McCoy and Dick Hoole, featuring some of the world's best surfers and the world's champion windsurfers. The film was produced by "Hoole/McCoy Films" in association with "Rip Curl Wetsuits", and "L.K. Communications".

The documentary was filmed in Sumatra, Java, Bali, Africa, Hawaii and Australia.

Storm Riders was digitally remastered and re-released in 2007 to celebrate the movie's 25th anniversary.

== Featured Riders ==
- Surfer – Wayne 'Rabbit' Bartholomew
- Surfer – Gerry Lopez
- Surfer – Mark Richards
- Surfer – Wayne Lynch
- Surfer – Joe Engel
- Surfer – Peter McCabe
- Surfer – Simon Anderson
- Surfer – Shaun Thomson
- Surfer – Thornton Fallander
- Surfer – Tommy Carroll
- Surfer – Soeda_Hiromitch
- Surfer – Tako Misao
- Surfer - Ted Deerhurst
- Windsurfer – Robbie Naish

== Soundtrack ==
LP EMI EMX-112 Film soundtrack compiled by Hugh Rule and Brett Goldsmith.

Track Listing: (Aus)

1. "The Unloved One" instrumental performed by INXS
2. "Summer of 81" performed by Mondo Rock
3. "Hard Act to Follow" performed by Split Enz
4. "Bustin' Loose" performed by Moving Pictures
5. "Life Speeds Up" performed by The Church
6. "Local and/or General" performed by Models
7. "Unpublished Critics" performed by Australian Crawl
8. "Cool Change" performed by Little River Band
9. "Tunnel of Love" performed by Sunnyboys
10. "Hit & Run" performed by Jo Jo Zep & The Falcons
11. "Asian Paradise" performed by Sharon O'Neil
12. "Hot Cover" performed by Matt Finish
13. "I'm Not Like Everybody Else" performed by Jimmy & The Boys
14. "Falling" performed by Mark Gillespie

Track Listing: (US version)

1. "Hard Act to Follow" performed by Split Enz
2. "Summer of 81" performed by Mondo Rock
3. "Life Speeds Up" performed by The Church
4. "Look at Me" performed by Matt Finish
5. "Big City Talk" performed by Marc Hunter
6. "Unpublished Critics" performed by Australian Crawl
7. "Gay Guys" performed by The Dugites
8. "This Is the Ritz" performed by N Z Pop
9. "People" performed by Mi-Sex
10. "I'm Not Like Everybody Else" performed by Jimmy & The Boys
11. "Local and/or General" performed by Models
12. "Albert of India" performed by Split Enz

=== Charts ===
Chart (1982)	Peak position
Australia (Kent Music Report)	25
