= Storm Riders (TV series) =

- Starring: Simon Brewer; Juston Drake
- Narrated by: Carl Bishop
- Theme music composer: David Varga
- Country of origin: United States
- Original language: English
- No. of seasons: 4
- No. of episodes: 32

Production
- Executive producers: Benjamin Page; Knute Wlaker; Keith May
- Producers: Erin McGarry; Teri Lemon
- Cinematography: Erin McGarry
- Editor: Collin Dow
- Running time: 30 minutes
- Production companies: Peacock Productions; The Weather Channel

Original release
- Network: The Weather Channel
- Release: December 13, 2009 – April 30, 2013

Storm Riders is a reality television series following two meteorologists as they travel across the Great Plains and East Coast of the United States in search of thunderstorms, tornadoes, and other severe weather. Storm Riders was aired on The Weather Channel, and it was included on the channel's Tornado Week programming.

== Premise ==
Simon Brewer and Juston Drake, two young meteorologists and the titular "Storm Riders," travel the United States in the pursuit of recording severe weather, while working as a "bare-bones operation" with limited technology.

== Cast ==
=== Simon Brewer ===
A meteorologist and storm chaser from Norman, Oklahoma, Simon received his degree in meteorology from the University of Oklahoma in 2008. He chases and documents extreme weather phenomena. Over the course of his career, he has observed numerous tornadoes, hurricanes, tropical storms, winter storms, and supercells. Simon recorded the 2004 Hallam tornado, which holds the record for the second-widest diameter of a tornado in history. He has intercepted three major hurricanes, including Hurricane Katrina.

=== Juston Drake ===
Justin is a meteorologist and storm chaser from Topeka, Kansas. His interest in weather arose from listening to his mother's stories of when an F5 tornado destroyed her home. He began storm chasing in 2006, and has witnesses tornadoes, supercells, and hurricanes. His degree in meteorology allows him to collect data and document storms.

== Episodes ==
=== Season 1 (2009–11) ===
No. overall	No. in season	Title	Original release date
1	1	"Pilot"	December 13, 2009
Meteorologists, Simon Brewer and Juston Drake, follow bad weather across the United States.
2	2	"Aurora Tornadoes"	April 3, 2010
In the series opener, Juston and Simon tracks tornadoes and other severe storms using technology and their instincts.
3	3	"Jacksboro Tornado"	April 3, 2010
The meteorologists chase a tornado in Jacksboro, Texas.
4	4	"Hurricane Bill"	July 5, 2010
Simon and Juston track Hurricane Bill.
5	5	"Campo, CO Tornado"	September 11, 2010
A gale in Colorado surprises the storm chasers.
6	6	"Lightning Strikes in the Heart of Texas"	September 18, 2010
The team dodges a lighting storm in Texas.
7	7	"Wyoming Tornado"	September 25, 2010
Simon and Juston follow tornadoes to Wyoming.
8	8	"Night Chasing in Minnesota"	October 2, 2010
The team chases tornadoes at night, and the dangers of doing so are spotlighted.
9	9	"Danger in Nebraska"	February 1, 2011
The crew encounters a frightening situation in Nebraska.

=== Season 2 (2011) ===
No. overall	No. in season	Title	Original release date
10	1	"Ice Storm"	February 17, 2011
In Oklahoma, a storm throws freezing rain, sleet, and snow at Simon and Juston.
11	2	"Oklahoma Tornado Outbreak"	February 24, 2009
The meteorologists track a tornado outbreak of three tornadoes through Oklahoma.
12	3	"Minnesota Tornado Outbreak"	March 3, 2011
Tornadoes break out in Minnesota.
13	4	"Oklahoma Tornado Night Chase"	March 10, 2011
Nighttime tornado detection proves difficult for the team.
14	5	"G Meets the Storm Riders"	March 17, 2011
Dr. Greg Forbes, a severe weather expert, joins the Storm Riders on a chase.
15	6	"Colorado Tornado"	March 24, 2011
The team chase tornadoes in Colorado.
16	7	"Texas Tornadoes"	March 24, 2011
Within three hours, the team chases five storms.

=== Season 3 (2011–12) ===
No. overall	No. in season	Title	Original release date
17	1	"Mapleton, IA Tornadoes"	August 1, 2011
The Storm Riders follow tornado activity to Mapleton, IA.
18	2	"NE Oklahoma Tornado Outbreak (and Joplin Tornado)"	August 2, 2011
Multiple tornadoes arrive in Oklahoma, and Joplin, MO is devastated by a severe tornado.
19	3	"Tuscaloosa Tornado"	September 27, 2011
Juston and Simon chase the 2011 Tuscaloosa–Birmingham tornado in Tuscaloosa, AL.
20	4	"Central Oklahoma Tornado Outbreak"	October 4, 2011
Simon is concerned about a tornado heading for his hometown.
21	5	"TX/WI Tornadoes"	October 11, 2011
The Storm Riders encounter a multiple-vortex tornado.
22	6	"SE Oklahoma Tornadoes"	October 24, 2011
Simon and Juston chase to a tornado in southeast Oklahoma.
23	7	"Dupree, SD Tornadoes"	October 25, 2011
The team is trapped by a slow-moving flood in South Dakota.
24	8	"KS/IL/NE Coldcore Tornadoes"	November 8, 2011
The team tracks tornadoes through Kansas, Illinois, and Nebraska
25	9	"KS/OK Tornadoes"	November 15, 2011
A multi-vortex tornado moves through Kansas and Oklahoma.
26	10	"Hurricane Irene"	March 26, 2012
The Storm Riders track Hurricane Irene on the US's East Coast. They decide to travel into the eye of the storm.

=== Season 4 (2011–12) ===
No. overall	No. in season	Title	Original release date
27	1	"Massive Hail"	March 30, 2013
Hail pummels the team and they witness a supercell storm. One of them chases and nearly gets hit by a tornado in Indiana.
28	2	"Twisters Snake Across the Sky"	March 30, 2013
The Storm Riders chase two tornadoes in Oklahoma, where destructive hail slows down the pursuit.
29	3	"Tornadoes Hit Close to Home"	March 30, 2013
A rain-wrapped tornado hits Norman, OK. A second arrives in Hobart, OK. Two simultaneous tornadoes, which is a rare weather event, are tracked.
