= June 4, 1993, derecho =

Weather event in the United States

June 4, 1993 Derecho
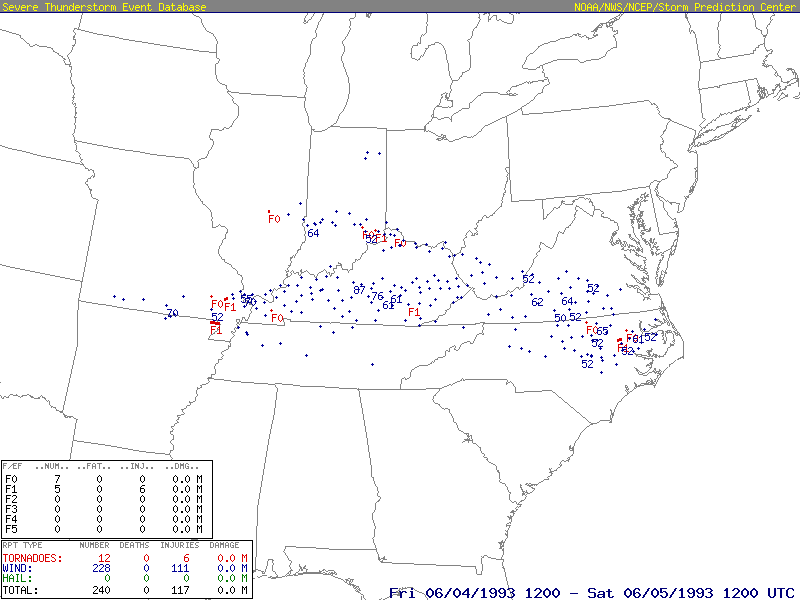
- Wind and tornado reports from the derecho
- Date(s): June 4, 1993
- Duration: 7 hours
- Peak wind gust (measured): 100 mph (161 km/h; 44.7 m/s) (Elizabethtown, KY, United States)
- Largest hail: 3.50 in (8.9 cm) (Mocksville, North Carolina)
- Tornado count: 12
- Strongest tornado^{1}: F1 tornado
- Damage costs: est. $70 million
- Types of damage: Significant damage to structures was reported, including peeled roofs and toppled church steeples. Numerous trees were damaged, causing widespread power outages. Crops were impacted by winds and hail.
- Areas affected: Midwestern United States Eastern United States State Breakdown: Missouri (SE); Illinois (S); Kentucky; Indiana; West Virginia; Virginia; North Carolina
- ^{1}Most severe tornado damage; see Fujita scale

On June 4, 1993, a severe derecho swept across the Midwestern and Eastern United States. The most significant damage was reported in portions of southern Virginia, especially Lynchburg. The derecho caused widespread wind damage in a swath from Missouri eastward through much of Kentucky into Virginia and North Carolina. In addition, several severe wind reports were received across this swath and a few weak tornadoes were confirmed along the path. Widespread large and damaging hail was also observed along the path.

Moderate to significant damage was observed along the path. The hardest hit area was in Lynchburg, Virginia, where winds of 80 mph were recorded. Significant damages to homes were reported, with roofs being peeled and church steeples being toppled. In addition, numerous trees toppled caused 95% of the city to be without power.

Widespread crop damage was reported in portions of Virginia and North Carolina due to very large hail and damaging winds. There were also several spin-up tornadoes confirmed in North Carolina. In Virginia, there were several reports of tornado sightings, but none were actually confirmed.

== Meteorological synopsis ==
=== Surface features ===
On the morning of June 4th, a storm complex was moving across the Midwest. At the 12z Weather Prediction Center surface analysis, a surface low pressure was analyzed near the border of western Missouri and Arkansas. A large cold front extended from the surface low draped southwestward through Texas and into New Mexico. A cut-off low was also centered over Eastern Oklahoma along the cold front and southwest of the main low pressure. To the east, a stationary front extended from the main low and persisted due eastward across the Ohio River valley. An outflow boundary near the triple point was associated with a high-precipitation (HP) supercell that would be the foundational thunderstorm for the derecho.

Throughout the day, the main low pressure system continued moving slowly to the northeast. The stationary boundary which was due east at 12z became slightly tilted to the southeast while very slowly moving northward. The associated outflow boundary with the now mature squall line was on the south end of this system, and was moving to the south. By the 00z analysis, the squall line was in Virginia and North Carolina, with the outflow boundary extending from the North Carolina/Tennessee border to the islands of North Carolina and the far western Atlantic Ocean. The derecho was winding down by this point.

=== Environmental factors ===
At 1200 UTC, a weak 500 mb shortwave axis extended north to south across the southern Great Plains states. The 1200 UTC Paducah, KY (KPAH) sounding indicated a convective available potential energy (CAPE) of 1,838 J/kg and a lifted index (LI) of -6. The low level wind profile indicated little directional shear, but significant speed shear was present. The 1200 UTC PAH sounding indicated a mean wind of 250° at 25 knots. This is more than favorable for a squall line to produce significant damaging winds over a long period of time and a large area, creating the potential for a derecho.

== Derecho event ==
During the morning and early afternoon of 4 June 1993, a storm complex moved across southern Missouri, southern Illinois, western and central Kentucky, and northern middle Tennessee. An associated HP supercell evolved into a derecho. The derecho moved slightly south of and parallel to a surface boundary along the Ohio River valley. This serial derecho produced widespread wind damage and F0/F1 tornadoes, injuring 79 and causing more than $70 million in damage.

The first report of wind damage was at 1345 UTC about 20 miles northwest of Poplar Bluff, MO. Initial storm movement was from the west at 45 kts, although the bow echo complex quickly accelerated to 50 kts as it moved across southeast Missouri and western Kentucky, reaching PAH at 1525 UTC. The derecho reached Hopkinsville, KY at 1615 UTC, with its forward speed having increased to 70 kts. The derecho continued across central Kentucky and northern middle Tennessee, maintaining an average speed of 60 kts. The storm reached Bowling Green, KY and Gallatin, TN at 1700 UTC and continued into eastern Kentucky, reaching Somerset at 1810 UTC. The derecho exited Kentucky by 2000 UTC and continued eastward through Ohio and West Virginia. By 0000 UTC, 5 June, the derecho had moved to northeast North Carolina, producing windespread wind damage.

Although the derecho evolved from a HP supercell, it was likely sustained by a gravity wave, as suggested by the 60 kt movement of the derecho. The gravity wave developed in an atmosphere exhibiting stability near the surface with instability aloft, as indicated by the strong inversion present between the surface and 925 mb on the 1200 UTC PAH sounding. Gravity waves thrive near boundaries, as convergence near boundaries forces air to rise with capping, and the lack of buoyancy will cause the air to sink to its original position. Repetitive upward and downward motion beneath the inversion often induces gravity waves. Areas of high and low pressure, or the crests and troughs of a gravity wave respectively, often propagate with and help maintain convection above the capped layer.

Gravity waves weaken considerably when capping is eliminated. Without trapping, the amplitudes of most gravity waves decrease rapidly. Accordingly, the derecho weakened considerably as it entered Ohio and West Virginia during the late afternoon after the capping inversion had been eliminated by afternoon heating.

== Damage ==
There was significant damage reported along the path, primarily from strong winds. However, with widespread very large hail present along the entire path of the derecho, significant hail damage was reported to vehicles, windows, and especially crops. The total damage cost exceeded $70 million across the path.

=== Virginia and North Carolina ===
Portions of southern Virginia and northern North Carolina suffered the most severe known damage from the derecho. The strong winds blew across the Appalachian Mountains and into farmland, causing significant crop damage and toppling numerous trees in forests.

The derecho continued pushing eastward, reaching the Lynchburg, Virginia area, where the worst damage overall was reported. In Lynchburg, gusts of nearly 80 mph knocked over two church steeples, peeled back roofs and brick walls, damaged thousands of cars and toppled so many trees that power was cut to 95 percent of the city. At least 23 people were hurt by the falling trees, but no deaths were reported in the state. The damage in Lynchburg alone was estimated at $21 million at the time.

The Governor of Virginia declared a state of emergency for this area due to the severe damage.
