= Hallam, Nebraska =

- Village
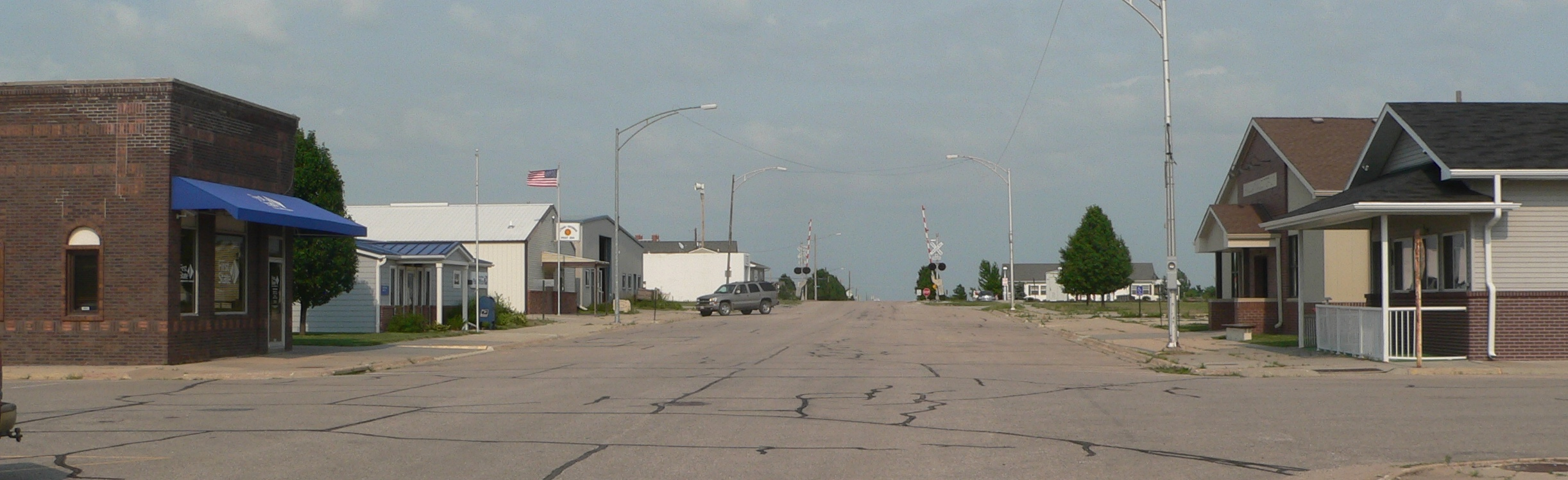
- Main Street in Hallam (2013)

- Location within Lancaster County and Nebraska
- Coordinates: 40°32′11″N 96°47′12″W
- Country: United States
- State: Nebraska
- County: Lancaster
- Platted: 1892
- Named for: Hallau

Area
  - Total: 0.22 sq mi (0.56 km^{2})
  - Land: 0.22 sq mi (0.56 km^{2})
  - Water: 0 sq mi (0.00 km^{2})
- Elevation: 1,486 ft (453 m)

Population (2020)
  - Total: 268
  - Density: 1,200/sq mi (480/km^{2})
- Time zone: UTC-6 (Central (CST))
  - Summer (DST): UTC-5 (CDT)
- ZIP Code: 68368
- Area code: 402
- FIPS code: 31-20610
- GNIS ID: 2398224
- Website: villageofhallamnebraska.com

Hallam is a village in Lancaster County, Nebraska, United States. The population was 268 at the 2020 census.

== History ==
Hallam was platted in 1892 when the Chicago, Rock Island and Pacific Railroad was extended to that point. The land was sold by Frederick Schneider, who was asked to name the village. However, Schneider's proposals were already names of towns in Nebraska, so the first landowner in the village, Jacob Schadd, was given the honor of naming the settlement. Schadd suggested Hallau, after his hometown in Switzerland. However, due to a transcription error at the post office, the name was recorded as Hallam rather than Hallau, similar to the error which altered Norfork to Norfolk, Nebraska.

Mrs. Maggie Classen owned several lots in Hallam, unusual for a woman in the 1890s, upon which were built the telephone office and a doctor's office. By the early 1900s, Hallam featured a bank, a hardware store, a dry goods store, a shoe shop, a druggist, a livery barn, and a doctor.

In 1962, the second nuclear power plant in the United States, the Hallam Nuclear Power Facility, was completed in Hallam. However, the plant only produced nuclear power for approximately one year before being converted to coal power.

=== 2004 tornado ===
On May 22, 2004, Hallam was struck by an F4 tornado, which killed one person, injured nearly 40 more, and destroyed most of the town. The tornado's path was 2.5 miles (4.0 km) wide, making it the widest tornado on record at the time. That record was broken on May 31, 2013, by the 2.6 mile-wide EF3 wedge tornado that hit El Reno, Oklahoma.

== Geography ==
According to the United States Census Bureau, the village has a total area of 0.17 square miles (0.44 km^{2}), all land.

== Demographics ==
Historical population
Census	Pop.	Note	%±
1910	168		—
1920	212		26.2%
1930	193		−9.0%
1940	168		−13.0%
1950	172		2.4%
1960	264		53.5%
1970	280		6.1%
1980	290		3.6%
1990	309		6.6%
2000	276		−10.7%
2010	213		−22.8%
2020	268		25.8%
U.S. Decennial Census

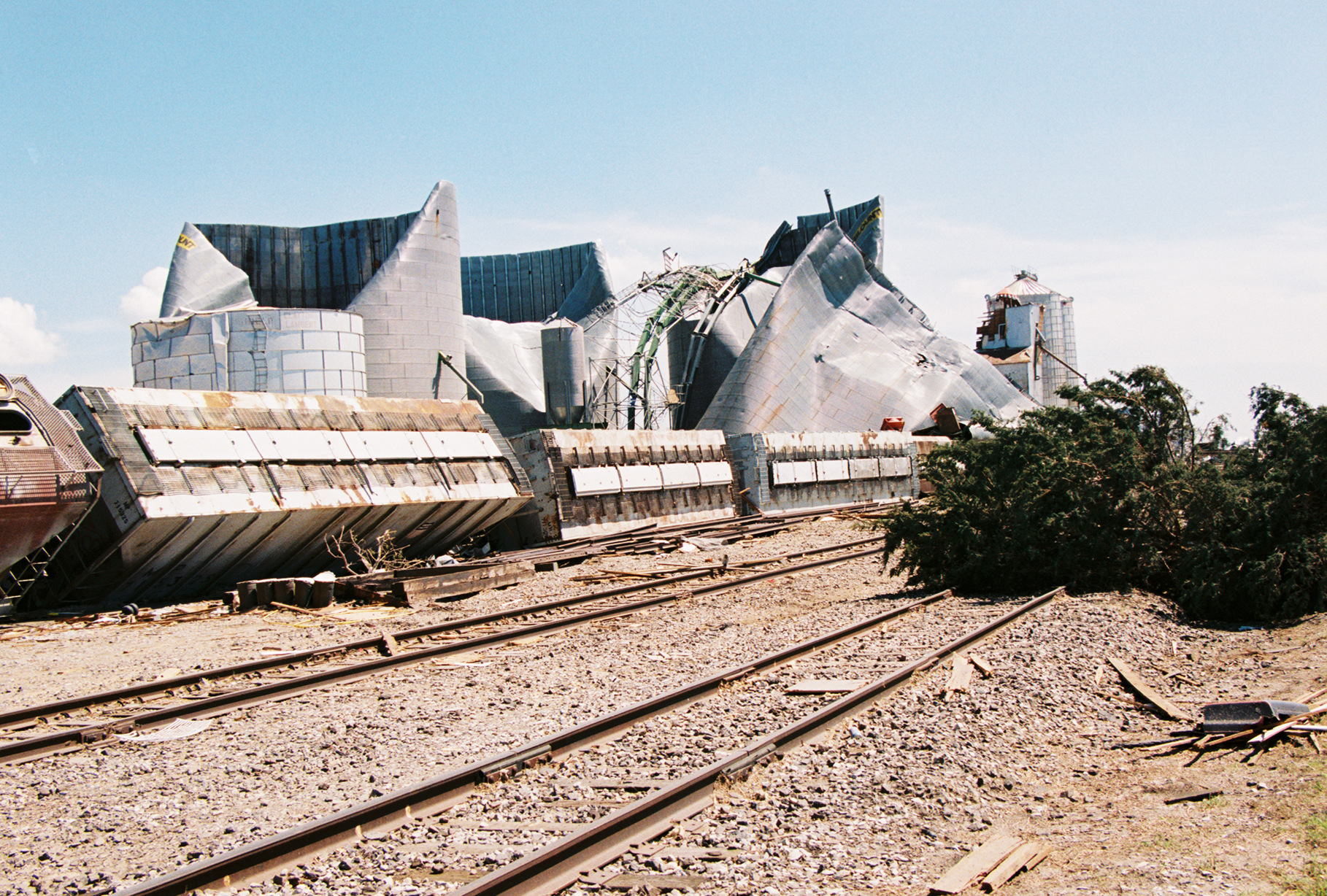
May 2004 tornado damage

Hallam is part of the Lincoln, Nebraska Metropolitan Statistical Area.

=== 2010 census ===
As of the census of 2010, there were 213 people, 78 households, and 63 families living in the village. The population density was 1,252.9 inhabitants per square mile (483.7/km^{2}). There were 81 housing units at an average density of 476.5 per square mile (184.0/km^{2}). The racial makeup of the village was 95.3% White, 0.9% Native American, 3.3% Asian, and 0.5% from two or more races.

There were 78 households, of which 41.0% had children under the age of 18 living with them, 65.4% were married couples living together, 10.3% had a female householder with no husband present, 5.1% had a male householder with no wife present, and 19.2% were non-families. 12.8% of all households were made up of individuals, and 6.4% had someone living alone who was 65 years of age or older. The average household size was 2.73 and the average family size was 2.95.

The median age in the village was 35.1 years. 27.7% of residents were under the age of 18; 5.2% were between the ages of 18 and 24; 30% were from 25 to 44; 30.1% were from 45 to 64; and 7% were 65 years of age or older. The gender makeup of the village was 53.5% male and 46.5% female.

=== 2000 census ===
As of the census of 2000, there were 276 people, 110 households, and 86 families living in the village. The population density was 1,680.2 inhabitants per square mile (648.7/km^{2}). There were 118 housing units at an average density of 718.4 per square mile (277.4/km^{2}). The racial makeup of the village was 92.39% White, 2.54% Native American, 4.35% Asian, and 0.72% from two or more races. And .0753% are Black.

There were 110 households, out of which 32.7% had children under the age of 18 living with them, 67.3% were married couples living together, 6.4% had a female householder with no husband present, and 21.8% were non-families. 15.5% of all households were made up of individuals, and 9.1% had someone living alone who was 65 years of age or older. The average household size was 2.51 and the average family size was 2.83.

In the village, the population was spread out, with 25.0% under the age of 18, 5.1% from 18 to 24, 36.6% from 25 to 44, 19.2% from 45 to 64, and 14.1% who were 65 years of age or older. The median age was 36 years. For every 100 females, there were 95.7 males. For every 100 females age 18 and over, there were 95.3 males.

As of 2000 the median income for a household in the village was $42,031, and the median income for a family was $45,156. Males had a median income of $32,361 versus $19,531 for females. The per capita income for the village was $20,071. None of the families and 2.5% of the population were living below the poverty line, including no under eighteens and 12.5% of those over 64.
