= Central United States =

Geographical region of the United States

Coordinates: 40°N 98°W

This video was taken by the crew of Expedition 29 on board the ISS. The pass begins over Canada and ends in the Caribbean Sea, covering the entire Central United States.

The Central United States is sometimes conceived as between the Eastern and Western as part of a three-region model, roughly coincident with the U.S. Census Bureau's definition of the Midwestern United States plus the western and central portions of the U.S. Census's definition of the Southern United States. The Central States are typically considered to consist of North Dakota, South Dakota, Nebraska, Kansas, Oklahoma, Texas, Minnesota, Iowa, Missouri, Arkansas, Louisiana, Wisconsin, Illinois, Michigan, Indiana, Ohio, Kentucky, Tennessee, West Virginia, Mississippi and Alabama.

== Geography ==
Chicago is the area's largest city and metropolitan area; other large cities with large metropolitan areas include New Orleans, Houston, Dallas, Fort Worth, San Antonio, Austin, Oklahoma City, Tulsa, Kansas City, Kansas and Kansas City, Missouri, Topeka, Wichita, Omaha, Nebraska and Lincoln, Minneapolis and St. Paul, Madison and Milwaukee, St. Louis, Louisville, Lexington, Detroit and Grand Rapids, Cincinnati, Cleveland, Columbus, Toledo, Dayton, Rockford, Peoria, Indianapolis, Evansville, Fort Wayne and South Bend.

Four of nine Census Bureau Divisions have names containing "Central", though they are not grouped as a region. They include 20 states and 39.45% of the U.S. population as of July 1, 2007.

Almost all of the area is in the Gulf of Mexico drainage basin and most of that is in the Mississippi basin. Small waterways near the Great Lakes drain into the Great Lakes, and eventually the St. Lawrence River. The Red River Valley is centered on the North Dakota-Minnesota border and drains to Hudson Bay. Floods have been a problem for the region during the 20th and early 21st century.

The Central Time Zone includes portions of the Florida panhandle, upper portions of Michigan, parts of Indiana, western Kentucky, western Tennessee, all of Texas except El Paso, and extends to the westernmost fringes of Great Plains states.

== Gallery ==
Central United States in 1908 from The Harmsworth atlas and Gazetter

Census Bureau Divisions with "Central" in their name include the West North Central and East North Central in the Midwest, along with the West South Central and East South Central in the South.

Map of U.S. time zones between April 2, 2006, and March 11, 2007. The current time zone now has Pulaski County, Indiana in the Eastern Time Zone and no longer in the Central Time Zone.

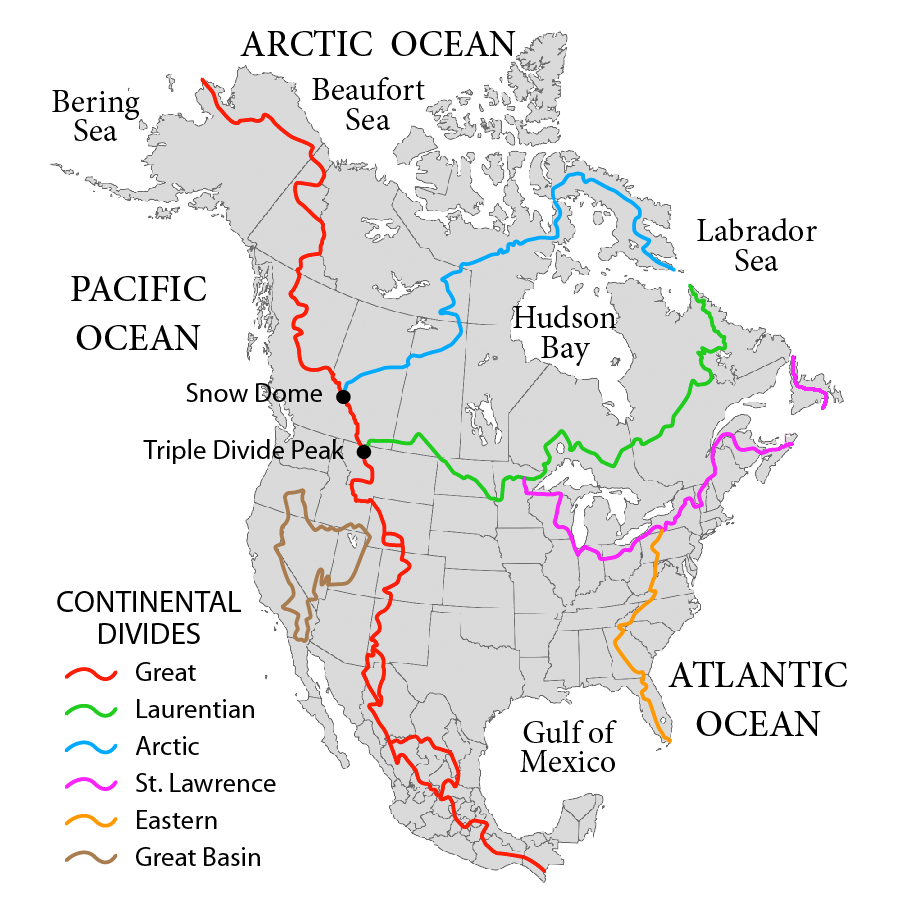
Continental divides in North America

== Central regions defined by organizations ==
Different organizations define the central regions of the United States in a variety of ways:

- YPO Only 6 central states of the Midwest, (Note: See Census definition) plus KY
- CERI All of Midwest and South including MD, DE
- NOAA Midwest minus OH, plus KY, CO, WY
- HSUS Midwest minus ND, SD, KS, plus KY
- USGS West North Central States, South Central United States, 4 eastern Mountain states
- Adventure Camp Midwest plus South minus Atlantic states, AL, WV
- Geography of the Interior United States
- MLB's National League Central Division, members in PA, OH, WI, IL, MO; TX through 2012
- MLB's American League Central Division, members in OH, MI, IL, MN, MO
- NBA's Central Division, members in OH, MI, IN, IL, WI, former members from NC, FL, GA, LA and Ontario (Canada)
- NHL's Central Division, members in CO, MN, TN, TX, IL, MO and Manitoba (Canada), former members in MI, AZ, OH and Ontario (Canada)
- The NFL's former National Football Conference Central Division, members in FL, MI, IL, WI, and MN
- The NFL's former American Football Conference Central Division, members in MD, PA, FL, OH, TN, former member from TX

== Geographic center of the United States ==
The geographic center of the 48 contiguous or conterminous United States, determined in a 1918 survey, is located at , about 2.6 miles (4.2 km) northwest of the center of Lebanon, Kansas, approximately 12 miles (19 km) south of the Kansas–Nebraska border. The determination is accurate to about 20 miles (32 km).

The NGS coordinates are recognized in a historical marker in a small park at the intersection of AA Road and K-191, although again, this will always be slightly off due changing shorelines and other factors. It is accessible by a turn-off from U.S. Route 281.

== See also ==
- Central Canada
- Gulf Coast of the United States
- Great Lakes region
- Heartland (United States) – Central area of the US that is culturally associated with traditional values
- List of regions of the United States
