= List of costliest tornadoes in the Americas =

The following is a list of the costliest tornadoes in the Americas including Canada and the United States. It includes all tornadoes that, when damage totals are adjusted for inflation, have cost at least $100 million in damages (in 2024 dollars).

As of September 18, 2024, there are 165 entries on this list with several of those entries including multiple tornadoes. This is dependent on how damages are assessed by certain agencies as well as the significance of certain events (e.g. 1980 Grand Island tornado outbreak when seven tornadoes struck the city of Grand Island, Nebraska in the same night; and the Dunrobin—Ottawa, Ontario—Gatineau, Quebec, Canada tornadoes in 2018 — of which there were seven — since monetary damages in Canada are often reported by province and not by individual tornado).

== Analysis ==
- Besides being one of the deadliest tornadoes on record in the Americas, the 1896 St. Louis–East St. Louis tornado is also the costliest; when adjusted for inflation and changes in wealth, it resulted in nearly $5.9 billion in damages.
- When adjusted for inflation, a total of thirteen (13) tornadoes/events have (each) caused in excess of $1 billion in damages;
- a total of thirty-two (32) tornadoes/events have (each) caused in excess of $500 million in damages;
- and a total of sixty-seven (67) tornadoes/events have caused in excess of $250 million in damages.

== List of costliest tornadoes ==
Affected Communities (Note: These are the communities (e.g. cities, towns, counties) where the greatest damage or loss of life occurred or at the beginning or end of the tornado’s track. The number of places that experience loss of life or damage is often higher than this. Colloquial tornado/event names, if applicable/known, are included in the Notes column of this table.)	Year	Month & Day	Original Cost (Note: Estimated total damages are primarily taken from the NCEI database; however, before 1996, coding included on the Storm Data reports provided an extremely broad, often inaccurate, range for damage totals. If a more accurate or updated total can be obtained from a reputable source, it will be included here instead.)	Adjusted Cost [USD] (March 1, 2024) (Note: Wikipedia formulas only allow adjusting damage totals (for inflation) through 2021. Adjustments of damage totals for inflation and wealth changes have been calculated with the website in2013dollars.com and Charles A. Doswell's 1997 paper which includes rates of inflation through the current year and normalised damage values. As these rates can be volatile (possibly changing from month to month), note that these calculations were made on May 15, 2023 and will be updated regularly.)	F or EF (Note: After the Fujita Scale was implemented in 1971, tornadoes from the previous 100 years (1871-1971) were retrospectively reviewed to determine their ratings. These reviews were completed by either Ted Fujita or Thomas P. Grazulis. Damage assessments from 1971-2006 were completed by using the Fujita Scale or, since 2007, the Enhanced Fujita Scale. These reviews have been handled by teams of meteorologists and structural engineers as assigned by National Weather Service (NWS) offices around the United States.)	References & Notes
St. Louis—East St. Louis, Illinois	1896	May 27	$10,000,000	$5,922,975,990	F4	1896 St. Louis–East St. Louis tornado
Joplin—Duquesne, Missouri	2011	May 22	$2,800,000,000	$3,839,119,050	EF5	2011 Joplin tornado
St. Louis, Missouri	1927	September 29	$53,000,000	$3,655,074,146	F3	Tornado outbreak of September 29, 1927, (Grazulis, p. 814)
Tuscaloosa—Holt—Alberta City—Concord—Pleasant Grove—Birmingham (Pratt City)—Fultondale, Alabama	2011	April 27	$2,450,000,000	$3,359,229,169	EF4	2011 Tuscaloosa–Birmingham tornado
Ellington, Missouri-Murphysboro/De Soto, Illinois-Griffin, Indiana/Princeton, Indiana	1925	March 18	$16,500,000	$2,922,730,672	F5	1925 Tri-State tornado, (Grazulis, p. 796)
Newcastle—Moore, Oklahoma	2013	May 20	$2,000,000,000	$2,647,844,881	EF5	2013 Moore tornado
Petersham—Barre—Rutland—Holden—Worcester—Shrewsbury—Westborough—Southborough, Massachusetts	1953	June 9	$52,193,000	$2,319,210,704	F4+	1953 Worcester tornado (includes crop damage of ~$50,000)
Topeka, Kansas	1966	June 8	$100,000,000	$2,298,062,133	F5	Tornado outbreak sequence of June 1966, (Grazulis, p. 1,081) (Total damages may have been greater than this.)
Lubbock, Texas	1970	May 11	$135,000,000	$2,199,201,632	F5	Lubbock tornado, (Grazulis, p. 1,113)
Nashville—Mount Juliet, Tennessee	2020	March 3	$1,504,000,000	$1,906,665,207	EF3	2020 Nashville tornado, (Grazulis 2023, p. 590) Damage estimates range from $1.5 - $1.6 billion
North Dallas—Richardson, Texas	2019	October 20	$1,550,000,000	$1,869,870,237	EF3	2019 North Dallas tornado
Bridge Creek—Moore, Oklahoma	1999	May 3	$1,000,000,000	$1,851,242,497	F5	1999 Bridge Creek–Moore tornado
Waco, Texas	1953	May 11	$41,150,000	$1,826,623,536	F5	1953 Waco tornado outbreak
Poquonock/Windsor Locks, Connecticut—Feeding Hills, Massachusetts	1979	October 3	$420,000,000	$1,784,230,579	F4	Windsor Locks tornado Grazulis reported that damages totaled $214,000,000 or $909,107,961, adjusted. (Grazulis, p. 1,216)
Hackleburg—Phil Campbell—Tanner—Harvest—Athens, Alabama	2011	April 27	$1,290,000,000	$1,768,736,991	EF5	2011 Hackleburg-Phil Campbell tornado
Wichita Falls, Texas	1979	April 10	$400,000,000	$1,699,267,217	F4	1979 Wichita Falls tornado, (Grazulis, p. 1,209)
Richmond Heights-Clayton-St. Louis, Missouri-Granite City-Pontoon Beach-Edwardsville, Illinois	2025	May 16	$1,600,000,000	$1,557,789,865	EF3	2025 St. Louis tornado
Omaha, Nebraska	1975	May 6	$250,000,000	$1,433,164,498	F4	1975 Omaha tornado outbreak, (Grazulis, p. 1,174) (Total damages may have been greater than this.)
East Peoria—Washington—Long Point, Illinois	2013	November 17	$935,000,000	$1,237,867,482	EF4	2013 Washington, Illinois tornado
Grand Island, Nebraska	1980	June 3	$300,000,000	$1,122,877,427	F4 (max)	1980 Grand Island tornado outbreak: "The Night of the Twisters" This includes all seven tornadoes. (Grazulis, p. 1,223)
Atlanta, Georgia	2008	March 14	$500,000,000	$766,856,476	EF2	2008 Atlanta, Georgia tornado
Grand Island, Nebraska (#5)	1980	June 3	$200,000,000	$748,584,951	F4	1980 Grand Island tornado outbreak: This was the strongest and costliest of the seven tornadoes that touched down on "The Night of the Twisters"
Jackson, Mississippi	1966	March 3	$75,500,000	$718,687,762	F5	1966 Jackson, Mississippi tornado
Fort Worth, Texas	2000	March 28	$400,000,000	$716,415,796	F3	2000 Fort Worth tornado outbreak
Andover—Wichita, Kansas	1991	April 26	$300,000,000	$679,332,599	F5	1991 Andover tornado
Xenia, Ohio	1974	April 3	$107,500,000	$672,511,714	F5	1974 Xenia tornado, (Grazulis, p. 1,154)
Monticello, Indiana (tornado family)	1974	April 3	$100,000,000	$625,592,292	F4	List of tornadoes in the 1974 Super Outbreak (Total damages may have been greater than this.)
Conyers, Stockbridge, Georgia	1973	March 31	$90,000,000	$625,169,594	F4	(Grazulis, p. 1,135)
Moore—Oklahoma City—Choctaw, Oklahoma	2003	May 8	$370,500,000	$621,024,448	F3	Tornado outbreak sequence of May 2003
Brookville—Trotwood—Dayton—Riverside, Ohio	2019	May 27	$500,000,000	$603,183,947	EF4	2019 Dayton tornado
Fort Smith—Van Buren, Arkansas	1996	April 21	$300,000,000	$589,707,456	F3	Tornado outbreak sequence of April 1996
Tallulah, Louisiana—Yazoo City/Durant, Mississippi	2010	April 24	$409,555,000	$589,173,874	EF4	2010 Yazoo City tornado Grazulis reported $400 million (or $565,757,420, adjusted) in damages. (Grazulis 2023, p. 438)
Woodland Mills, Tennessee—Cayce—Mayfield—Princeton—Dawson Springs—Barnsley—Bremen—Hartford, Kentucky	2021	December 10	$507,000,000	$586,604,560	EF4	2021 Western Kentucky tornado
Edmonton, Alberta, Canada	1987	July 31	CA$332,270,000	$572,485,510	F4	Edmonton tornado CA$770,565,549, adjusted (average exchange rate for 2024, CA$1 = US$0.742942)
Conestogo Lake—Fergus—Tavistock, Ontario, Canada	2005	August 19	CA$500,000,000	$551,433,463	F2-F1	Southern Ontario tornado outbreak of 2005 CA$742,229,492, adjusted (Total damages may have been greater than this.) (average exchange rate for 2024, CA$1 = US$0.742942)
Oak Leaf—Lancaster—Dallas, Texas	2012	April 3	$400,000,000	$537,325,888	EF2	Tornado outbreak of April 3, 2012
Little Rock–North Little Rock, Arkansas	2023	March 31	>$489,000,000	$502,940,000	EF3	2023 Little Rock tornado
Margaret/Ragland/Shoal Creek Valley/Ohatchee/Piedmont, Alabama—Cave Spring/Kingston, Georgia	2011	April 27	$366,755,000	$502,862,895	EF4	2011 Shoal Creek Valley-Ohatchee tornado
Fayetteville, Tennessee	1952	February 29	$43,000,000	$500,450,226	F3	Tornado outbreak of Leap Day 1952, (Grazulis, p. 962)
Golden Valley—Mounds View—Centerville, Minnesota	1965	May 6	$51,000,000	$499,341,810	F4	Early May 1965 tornado outbreak, (Grazulis, p. 1,074)
Altus—Altus AFB, Oklahoma	1982	May 11	$150,000,000	$479,404,663	F3	Grazulis reported $200 million in damages including hail, estimated $150 million from the tornado alone (Grazulis, p. 1,239)
Shreveport—Bossier City, Louisiana	1978	December 3	$100,000,000	$473,032,209	F4	1978 Bossier City tornado outbreak (Total damages may have been greater than this.)
Enterprise, Alabama	2007	March 1	$307,000,000	$456,656,244	EF4	Tornado outbreak of February 28 – March 2, 2007
Albany—Ashburn—Rochelle, Georgia	2017	January 22	$310,000,000	$390,050,873	EF3	Tornado outbreak of January 21–23, 2017
Plainfield, Illinois	1990	August 28	$165,000,000	$389,355,815	F5	1990 Plainfield tornado
Birmingham, Alabama	1998	April 8	$202,830,000	$383,780,491	F5	1998 Oak Grove–Birmingham tornado
Oak Lawn—Evergreen Park—Chicago Illinois	1967	April 21	$40,000,000	$369,361,677	F4	1967 Oak Lawn tornado outbreak (Total damages may have been greater than this.)
Jonesboro, Arkansas	2020	March 28	$300,000,000	$357,499,726	EF3	2020 Jonesboro tornado (Grazulis 2023, p. 590)
St. Louis, Missouri—Granite City, Illinois	2011	April 22	$250,000,000	$342,778,487	EF4	2011 St. Louis tornado
Atlanta, Georgia	1975	March 24	$56,500,000	$323,895,177	F3	"The Governor's Tornado" as it caused damage to the Governor's mansion among many other buildings (Grazulis, p. 1,173)
Haysville—McConnell AFB—Andover, Kansas	2012	April 14	$238,000,000	$319,708,904	EF3	Tornado outbreak of April 13–16, 2012 (Grazulis 2023, p. 495) Other reports claim upwards of $500 million in damage, but this was proven inaccurate.
Carterville—Crainville—Marion, Illinois	1982	May 29	$100,000,000	$319,603,109	F4	Marion, Illinois, tornado outbreak, (Grazulis, p. 1,242)
Salt Lake City, Utah	1999	August 11	$170,000,000	$314,711,224	F2	1999 Salt Lake City tornado
Orland, Indiana—East Gilead/Reading/Hillsdale/Manitou Beach, Michigan (two tornadoes)	1965	April 11	$32,000,000	$313,312,508	F4	List of tornadoes in the 1965 Palm Sunday tornado outbreak
Westfield—West Springfield—Springfield—Wilbraham—Monson—Brimfield—Sturbridge—Southbridge—Charlton, Massachusetts	2011	June 1	$227,600,000	$312,065,534	EF3	2011 Springfield tornado
Augusta—Tupelo—Otwell—Jonesboro, Arkansas	1973	May 26	$44,110,000	$306,402,565	F4	(Total damages may have been greater than this.) Grazulis reported $37 million in damages or $257,014,167, adjusted (Grazulis, p. 1,141)
Hamden—North Haven, Connecticut	1989	July 10	$120,000,000	$298,468,065	F4	July 1989 Northeastern United States tornado outbreak
Brownsville—Monroe, Louisiana	2020	April 12	$250,000,000	$297,916,439	EF3	2020 Monroe tornado,
Woodstock, Stratford, Ontario, Canada	1979	August 7	CA$100,000,000	$295,070,920	F4	1979 Woodstock, Ontario, tornado CA$397,165,486, adjusted (Total damages may have been greater than this.) (average exchange rate for 2024, CA$1 = US$0.742942)
Mayflower, Vilonia, Arkansas	2014	April 27	$223,450,000	$291,108,149	EF4	2014 Mayflower–Vilonia tornado
Vicksburg, Mississippi	1953	December 5	$25,000,000	$288,779,963	F5	1953 Vicksburg, Mississippi, tornado
Gainesville, Georgia	1936	April 6	$13,000,000	$288,447,554	F4	1936 Tupelo–Gainesville tornado outbreak, (Grazulis, p. 866)
Barrie, Ontario, Canada	1985	May 31	CA$150,000,000	$281,014,346	F4	1985 Barrie tornado: CA$378,245,335, adjusted (Total damages may have been greater than this) (average exchange rate for 2024, CA$1 = US$0.742942)
Charles City, Iowa	1968	May 15	$31,500,000	$279,170,560	F5	1968 Charles City tornado, (Grazulis, p. 1,097)
Indianapolis	2002	September 20	$156,000,000	$269,190,000	F3	2002 Indianapolis tornado
Kennedale—Arlington, Texas	2012	April 3	$200,000,000	$268,662,944	EF2	Tornado outbreak of April 3, 2012
Haysville—South Wichita, Kansas	1999	May 3	$145,000,000	$268,430,162	F4	1999 Haysville–Wichita tornado
Wildwood—Colfax, Wisconsin	1958	June 4	$25,000,000	$266,796,713	F5	Tornado outbreak of June 3–4, 1958
Wilber—Hallam—Norris School District 160—Holland, Nebraska	2004	May 22	$160,220,000	$261,591,169	F4	2004 Hallam tornado The second-widest tornado on record (~2.5 miles) almost completely destroyed the small town of Hallam.
Dunrobin—Ottawa, Ontario—Gatineau, Quebec, Canada	2018	September 21	CA$294,000,000	$260,046,596	EF3 max	2018 United States-Canada tornado outbreak: CA$350,022,742, adjusted (Total damages may have been greater than this.) (average exchange rate for 2024, CA$1 = US$0.742942) This includes all seven tornadoes from this event as damages (per event/outbreak) are reported by province, not individual tornado. Damages in Ontario were CA$192 million+, and damages in Quebec were CA$102 million+.
Yale—Tulsa, Oklahoma	1981	April 19	$75,000,000	$254,469,472	F3	(Grazulis, p. 1,229)
Huntsville, Alabama	1989	November 15	$100,000,000	$248,723,387	F4	November 1989 tornado outbreak
Falmouth/Berlin/Bladeston/Chatham/Dover, Kentucky—Decatur/Otway, Ohio	1968	April 23	$27,775,000	$246,157,534	F4	Tornado outbreak of April 21–24, 1968 (Total damages were estimated.)
Marshalltown, Iowa	2018	July 19	$200,000,000	$245,525,614	EF3	Iowa tornado outbreak of July 2018 (Grazulis 2023, p. 569)
Toledo, Ohio—Lost Peninsula (Michigan)	1965	April 11	$25,000,000	$244,775,397	F4	List of tornadoes in the 1965 Palm Sunday tornado outbreak, (Grazulis, p. 1,071)
Sanford—Raleigh, North Carolina	2011	April 16	$172,000,000	$235,831,599	EF3	Tornado outbreak of April 14–16, 2011 Grazulis reported $132 million (or $180,987,040, adjusted) in damages (Grazulis 2023, p. 458)
Tulsa/Tulsa County—Catoosa/Rogers County, Oklahoma	1993	April 24	$110,000,000	$234,781,107	F4	(Grazulis, p. 1,348)
Carrollton—Reform—Cordova—Sipsey—Blountsville, Alabama	2011	April 27	$170,344,000	$233,561,034	EF4	2011 Cordova–Blountsville tornado Grazulis estimated $150 million (or $205,667,092, adjusted) in damages (Grazulis 2023, p. 467)
Macksburg—Winterset—Norwalk—Newton, Iowa	2022	March 5	$220,000,000	$231,848,240	EF4	Winterset tornado Grazulis reported $200 million (or $210,771,127, adjusted) in damages (Grazulis 2023, p. 619)
Mount Vernon/De Kalb, Texas—Mineral Springs, Arkansas	1999	May 4	$125,000,000	$231,405,312	F3	List of tornadoes in the 1999 Oklahoma tornado outbreak
Wetumpka—LaFayette, Alabama	2011	April 27	$167,000,000	$228,976,029	EF4	List of tornadoes in the 2011 Super Outbreak
Largo—Clearwater—Carrollwood—Temple Terrace—Galloway—Gibsonia—Loughman, Florida	1966	April 4	$24,000,000	$228,457,037	F4	Tornado outbreak of April 4–5, 1966, (Grazulis, p. 1,079)
Hennepin County, Minnesota	2011	May 22	$166,620,000	$228,455,006	EF1	List of tornadoes in the tornado outbreak sequence of May 21–26, 2011
Greensburg, Kansas	2007	May 4	$153,000,000	$227,584,382	EF5	2007 Greensburg tornado
St. Peter, Minnesota	1998	March 29	$120,000,000	$227,055,460	F3	1998 Comfrey-St. Peter tornado outbreak
Sandusky—Lorain, Ohio	1924	June 28	$12,500,000	$225,451,023	F4	1924 Lorain–Sandusky tornado, (Grazulis, p. 790)
Flint—Beecher, Michigan	1953	June 8	$19,000,000	$219,472,772	F5	1953 Flint-Beecher tornado, (Grazulis, p. 974)
Windsor, Colorado	2008	May 22	$147,000,000	$210,574,395	EF3	Tornado outbreak of May 22–27, 2008
Jefferson City, Missouri	2019	May 22	$174,000,000	$209,908,014	EF3	Tornado outbreak of May 20–23, 2019
Tinker Air Force Base, Oklahoma County, Oklahoma	1948	March 20/25	$16,400,000	$209,877,129	F3	1948 Tinker Air Force Base tornadoes: Three tornadoes affected Tinker AFB in the span of six days: two on March 20 led to successful prediction of the third on March 25. These tornadoes significantly contributed to the process of predicting severe weather events. (Grazulis, p. 935)
Sarasota, Florida	1978	May 4	$43,000,000	$203,403,850	F3	(Grazulis, p. 1,202)
Belvidere, Illinois	1967	April 21	$22,000,000	$203,148,922	F4	1967 Belvidere tornado, (Grazulis, p. 1,088)
Raleigh, North Carolina	1988	November 28	$77,000,000	$200,744,793	F4	1988 Raleigh tornado outbreak
Southern Louisville suburbs, including Pioneer Village, Hillview, and Mount Washington, Kentucky	1996	May 28	$101,000,000	$198,534,843	F4	May 1996 Kentucky tornado outbreak
La Plata, Maryland	2002	April 28	$115,000,000	$197,153,724	F4	2002 La Plata tornado
Fayetteville, North Carolina	2011	April 16	$141,100,000	$193,464,178	EF3	Tornado outbreak of April 14–16, 2011 Grazulis reported $136 million (or $186,471,497, adjusted) in damages (Grazulis 2023, p. 458)
Nashville—East Nashville—Donelson—The Hermitage—Mt. Juliet, Tennessee	1998	April 16	$101,000,000	$191,105,012	F3	Tornado outbreak of April 15–16, 1998 (1998 Nashville tornado outbreak)
Granbury, Texas	2013	May 15	$143,000,000	$189,320,909	EF4	2013 Granbury tornado (Grazulis 2023, p. 500)
Austin, Texas	1980	August 10	$50,000,000	$187,146,237	F2	(Grazulis, p. 1,226)
Kalamazoo, Michigan	1980	May 13	$50,000,000	$187,146,237	F3	1980 Kalamazoo tornado, (Grazulis, p. 1,221)
Mena, Arkansas	2009	April 9	$130,000,000	$186,887,157	EF3	Tornado outbreak of April 9–11, 2009
Oelwein—Maynard, Iowa	1968	May 15	$21,000,000	$186,113,707	F5	1968 Oelwein tornado, (Grazulis, p. 1,098)
Southaven, Mississippi—Memphis, Tennessee	2008	February 5	$128,400,000	$183,930,288	EF2	List of tornadoes in the 2008 Super Tuesday tornado outbreak
Newton Falls/Niles/Hubbard, Ohio—Wheatland/Hermitage/Greenfield, Pennsylvania	1985	May 31	$63,800,000++	$182,871,790++	F5	1985 Niles–Wheatland tornado Grazulis reported $60 million in damages in Ohio alone. He also mentions a total of $3.8 million in damages in Pennsylvania but only with regard to trucks and other vehicles at a few different locations. He makes no mention of total damages in Pennsylvania and there are no resources available that provide that information. (Grazulis, p. 1,268) Considering the intensity of this violent tornado and the destruction of much of Wheatland's industry as well as the number of houses in and around Wheatland, we can safely surmise that the damage total is actually much higher.
Cordell, Oklahoma	2001	October 9	$100,000,000	$174,148,504	F3	Tornadoes of 2001
Center Point, Alabama	1973	May 27	$25,000,000	$173,658,220	F3	(Grazulis, p. 1,142)
Brent, Alabama	1973	May 27	$25,000,000	$173,658,220	F4	1973 Central Alabama tornado (Grazulis, p. 1,142)
Warner Robins—Robins Air Force Base—Jeffersonville, Georgia	1953	April 30	$15,000,000	$173,267,978	F4	Tornado outbreak sequence of April 28 – May 2, 1953, (Grazulis, p. 968)
Highland Park—Detroit, Michigan	1997	July 2	$90,000,000	$172,944,112	F2	Tornado outbreak of July 1–3, 1997
Little Rock Air Force Base—Jacksonville, Arkansas	2011	April 25	$125,000,000	$171,389,243	EF2	List of tornadoes in the 2011 Super Outbreak
Atkins—Clinton—Mountain View—Highland, Arkansas	2008	February 5	$119,310,000	$170,909,055	EF4	2008 Atkins–Clinton tornado
Wildwood—Lady Lake, Florida	2007	February 2	$114,000,000	$169,572,677	EF3	2007 Groundhog Day tornado outbreak
Monroe—Athens, Georgia	1973	March 31	$24,000,000	$166,711,892	F4	(Grazulis, p. 1,136)
Americus, Georgia	2007	March 1	$111,000,000	$165,110,238	EF4	Tornado outbreak of February 28 – March 2, 2007
Louisville, Mississippi	2014	April 28	$126,150,000	$164,346,802	EF4	2014 Louisville, Mississippi tornado Grazulis reported $117 million (or $152,426,284, adjusted) in damages (Grazulis 2023, p. 516)
Lake Pat Cleburne—Cleburne, Texas	2013	May 15	$124,000,000	$164,166,383	EF3	Tornado outbreak of May 15–17, 2013 (Grazulis 2023, p. 500)
Paris—Reno—Blossom, Texas	1982	April 2	$50,000,000	$159,801,554	F4	Tornado outbreak of April 2–3, 1982, (Grazulis, p. 1,236)
Minneapolis—Roseville, Minnesota	1981	June 14	$47,000,000	$159,467,536	F3	(Grazulis, p. 1,232)
Whiteface—Whitharral—Anton, Texas	1970	April 17	$20,000,000	$158,977,835	F4	Tornado outbreak sequence of April 17–19, 1970
Arabi, Louisiana	2022	December 14	$150,000,000	$158,078,356	EF2	Tornado outbreak of December 12–15, 2022 (Grazulis 2023, p. 633)
Jackson, Tennessee	2008	February 5	$110,300,000	$158,002,420	EF4	List of tornadoes in the 2008 Super Tuesday tornado outbreak
Omaha, Nebraska	1913	March 23	$5,000,000	$155,766,162	F3	Tornado outbreak sequence of March 1913, (Grazulis, p. 737)
Port Huron, Michigan, United States—Sarnia, Ontario, Canada	1953	May 21	$2,600,000 (US, USD) + $15,000,000 (CA, USD)	$153,066,781	F4	1953 Sarnia tornado CA: US$15 million = CA$14,617,170 (average exchange rate for 1953: US$1 = 0.CA$974478), CA$165,603,324 adjusted = US$123,033,665 adjusted (average exchange rate for 2024, CA$1 = US$0.742942).US: US$2.6 million = US$30,033,116 adjusted
Ardmore, Oklahoma	1995	May 7	$75,000,000	$151,780,020	F3	List of tornadoes in the May 1995 tornado outbreak sequence. Grazulis reported at least $100 million (or $202,373,359, adjusted) in damages. (Grazulis, p. 1,373)
Wichita Falls, Texas	1964	April 3	$15,000,000	$149,234,032	F5	1964 Wichita Falls tornado (Grazulis, p. 1,050)
Tampa—Pinellas County, Florida	1979	May 8	$35,000,000	$148,685,882	F2	(Grazulis, p. 1,213)
Pella—Peoria, Iowa	2018	July 19	$120,000,000	$147,315,368	EF3	Iowa tornado outbreak of July 2018 (Grazulis 2023, p. 569)
Comstock Park—Alpine—Grand Rapids, Michigan	1965	April 11	$15,000,000	$146,865,238	F4	List of tornadoes in the 1965 Palm Sunday tornado outbreak, (Grazulis, p. 1,065)
Millbury—Lake Township, Ohio	2010	June 5	$102,400,000	$144,833,900	EF4	2010 Millbury tornado
Delhi, Louisiana—Moorhead, Mississippi + Cary—Oxford, Mississippi + Vicksburg—Lexington, Mississippi (three tornadoes)	1971	February 21	$19,000,000	$144,689,457	F5	Tornado outbreak of February 21–22, 1971
Bauxite—Vimy Ridge—Shannon Hills—North Little Rock, Arkansas	1997	March 1	$75,000,000	$144,120,093	F4	March 1997 tornado outbreak
Murfreesboro, Tennessee	2009	April 10	$100,000,000	$143,759,352	EF4	Tornado outbreak of April 9–11, 2009
Jeffers—Comfrey—Hanska, Minnesota	1998	March 29	$75,050,000	$142,004,269	F4	1998 Comfrey-St. Peter tornado outbreak
Dunwoody, Georgia	1998	April 8	$75,000,000	$141,909,663	F2	Tornado outbreak of April 6–9, 1998
Chesterfield—Maryland Heights—St. Ann—Lambert Field, St. Louis—Spanish Lake, Missouri	1967	January 24	$15,000,000	$138,510,629	F4	1967 St. Louis tornado outbreak, (Grazulis, p. 1,087)
Smith Mills, Kentucky—Evansville/Paradise/Gentryville, Indiana	2005	November 6	$87,260,000	$137,800,652	F3	Evansville tornado outbreak of November 2005
Oologah, Oklahoma	1991	April 26	$60,000,000	$135,866,520	F4	1991 Andover tornado outbreak, (Grazulis, p. 1,412)
Cedar Park, Texas	1997	May 27	$70,110,000	$134,723,463	F3	1997 Central Texas tornado outbreak
Forney, Texas	2012	April 3	$100,000,000	$134,331,472	EF3	Tornado outbreak of April 3, 2012
Mechanicville/Stillwater, New York—Bennington, Vermont	1998	May 31	$70,630,000	$133,641,060	F3	Late-May 1998 tornado outbreak and derecho
Marmaduke, Arkansas—Caruthersville, Missouri	2006	April 2	$86,500,000	$132,331,699	F3	Tornado outbreak of April 2, 2006
Tinker AFB, Oklahoma	1948	March 20	$10,250,000	$131,173,205	F3	1948 Tinker Air Force Base tornadoes (Grazulis, p. 935)
Goderich, Ontario, Canada	2011	August 21	CA$130,000,000	$127,961,855	F3	2011 Goderich, Ontario, tornado CA$172,236,668, adjusted (average exchange rate for 2024, CA$1 = US$0.742942)
Bloodland—Fort Leonard Wood, Missouri	2010	December 31	$90,000,000	$127,295,420	EF3	2010 New Year's Eve tornado outbreak
College Park—Beltsville—Laurel, Maryland	2001	September 24	$73,000,000	$127,128,408	F3	Tornado outbreak of September 24, 2001
Cincinnati—Williamsburg, Ohio	1969	August 9	$15,000,000	$126,055,995	F3	(Grazulis, p. 1,107)
Emporia, Kansas	1974	June 8	$20,000,000	$125,118,458	F4	Tornado outbreak of June 8, 1974, (Grazulis, p. 1,166)
Camden—Hermitage, Arkansas	1979	April 8	$28,800,000	$122,347,240	F3	(Grazulis, p. 1,207)
Goodlettsville—Gallatin, Tennessee	2006	April 7	$79,000,000	$120,857,852	F3	Tornado outbreak of April 6–8, 2006
Windsor—Tecumseh, Ontario, Canada	1946	June 17	CA$9,663,000	$120,851,545	F4	1946 Windsor-Tecumseh tornado CA$162,666,191, adjusted (average exchange rate for 2024, CA$1 = US$0.742942)
Cookeville—Putnam County, Tennessee	2020	March 3	$100,000,000	$119,166,575	EF4	2020 Baxter–Cookeville tornado
Seneca—Clemson, South Carolina	2020	April 13	$100,000,000	$119,166,575	EF3	List of tornadoes in the 2020 Easter tornado outbreak
Eagle Pass, Texas	2007	April 24	$80,000,000	$118,998,370	EF3	Tornado outbreak sequence of April 20–27, 2007
Barneveld—Black Earth, Wisconsin	1984	June 7	$40,000,000	$118,736,092	F5	Tornado outbreak of June 7–8, 1984 (Grazulis, p. 1,259)
Lockett/Vernon, Texas—Davidson, Oklahoma	1979	April 10	$27,000,000	$114,700,537	F4	1979 Red River Valley tornado outbreak, (Grazulis, p. 1,207)
Fiatt—Canton, Illinois	1975	July 23	$20,000,000	$114,653,160	F3	1975 Canton, Illinois, tornado
Clarion—Belmond, Iowa	1966	October 14	$12,000,000	$114,228,518	F4	(Grazulis, p. 1,084)
Saugatuck—Hudsonville—Standale—Grand Rapids, Michigan	1956	April 3	$10,000,000	$113,388,603	F5	Tornado outbreak of April 2–3, 1956, (Grazulis, p. 995)
Atlanta Motor Speedway; Hampton, Georgia	2005	July 6	$71,500,000	$112,912,522	F2	Hurricane Cindy (2005)
Chandler—Lake Wilson, Minnesota	1992	June 16	$50,000,000	$109,913,400	F5	Tornado outbreak of June 14–18, 1992 Grazulis reported $45 million or $98,922,060 adjusted. (Grazulis, p. 1,331)
Tupelo, Mississippi	2023	March 31	$105,000,000	$109,750,000	EF1	List of tornadoes in the tornado outbreak of March 31 – April 1, 2023#Mississippi (March 31 – April 1)
Parkersburg—New Hartford, Iowa	2008	May 25	$75,000,000	$107,435,916	EF5	2008 Parkersburg–New Hartford tornado
St. Louis, Missouri	1959	February 10	$10,000,000	$105,985,223	F4	St. Louis tornado outbreak of February 1959: Total damages may have been greater than this. (Grazulis, p. 1,018)
Canton—Hazlehurst—Newton—Meridian, Mississippi	1976	March 29	$19,550,000	$105,967,528	F4	(Grazulis, p. 1,183)
Ragland—Piedmont—Rock Run, Alabama	1994	March 27	$50,500,000	$105,094,862	F4	1994 Palm Sunday tornado outbreak
Campbell—Poinciana—Kissimmee—Buenaventura Lakes—Lake Hart—Lake Mary Jane, Florida	1998	February 22	$55,000,000	$104,067,086	F3	1998 Kissimmee tornado outbreak
Dallas—De Soto, Texas	1994	April 25	$50,000,000	$104,054,318	F2	Tornado outbreak of April 25–27, 1994
Louisville—Jefferson County, Kentucky	1890	March 27	$3,000,000	$101,675,934	F4	Tornado outbreak of March 27, 1890, (Grazulis, p. 651)
Rolling Fork, Mississippi—Silver City, Mississippi	2023	March 24	$100,000,000	$101,219,168	EF4	2023 Rolling Fork–Silver City tornado Total damages may have been greater than this.
Adairsville—Blackwood, Georgia	2013	January 30	$75,000,000	$99,294,183	EF3	Tornado outbreak of January 29–30, 2013 (Grazulis 2023, p. 499)

== Bibliography ==
- Grazulis, Thomas (1993). Significant Tornadoes 1680–1991. St. Johnsbury, Vermont: The Tornado Project of Environmental Films. ISBN 1-879362-03-1.
- Grazulis, Thomas (1997). Significant Tornadoes Update, 1992–1995. St. Johnsbury, Vermont: The Tornado Project of Environmental Films. ISBN 1-879362-04-X.
- Grazulis, Thomas (2023). Significant Tornadoes 1974-2022. St. Johnsbury, Vermont: The Tornado Project of Environmental Films. ISBN 1-879362-01-5.

== See also ==
- Ted Fujita, creator of the original Fujita Scale (used in the United States from 1971 to 2007)
- Thomas P. Grazulis, meteorologist and author of "Significant Tornadoes"
- List of deadliest tornadoes in the Americas
- List of tornadoes and tornado outbreaks
  - List of Canadian tornadoes and tornado outbreaks (before 2001)
  - List of Canadian tornadoes and tornado outbreaks (since 2001)
  - List of North American tornadoes and tornado outbreaks
  - List of Southern Hemisphere tornadoes and tornado outbreaks
- List of F5 and EF5 tornadoes
- List of F4 and EF4 tornadoes
- Tornado climatology
- Tornado records
