= James Austin Kern =

Founder of the Florida Trail

James Austin Kern (born August 14, 1934) is an American naturalist, conservationist, hiker and author. He is the founder of the 1,300 mi (2,100 km) Florida National Scenic Trail (FT).

== Education and career ==
James Austin Kern was born in New York City and grew up in Leonia, New Jersey. In 1966, Kern founded the Florida Trail and the Florida Trail Association. On March 28, 1983, the United States Congress added the Florida Trail to the National Trails System. National Trails System In 1976, Kern co-founded the American Hiking Society with Bill Kemsley, founding publisher and former editor of Backpacker magazine, and Paul Pritchard, past president of the Appalachian Trail Conference. From April 1980 through May 1981, Kern organized and directed HikaNation, a historic 14-month cross-country backpacking trip from Golden Gate Park in San Francisco, California to the United States Capitol in Washington, D.C. The American Discovery Trail evolved from HikaNation. In 1990, Kern founded Big City Mountaineers, a high adventure program for disadvantaged teens.

Kern currently lives in St. Augustine, Florida and Highlands, North Carolina.
