= Crosby Island Marsh Preserve =

Nature reserve in Florida, US

The Crosby Island Marsh Preserve is a 243-acre nature preserve in southeast Orange County, Florida. It is part of Orange County's Green PLACE (Park Land Acquisition for Conservation and Environmental Protection) program, and opened to the public on July 17, 2019.

The preserve's habitats include pine flatwoods, freshwater marshes, oak hammocks, and the littoral zone of Lake Mary Jane. A portion of the land is dedicated to the United States Forest Service for the Florida National Scenic Trail.

Orange County bought the property in 2004 for $2.2 million, and the purchase added to a 3,000-acre wildlife corridor which includes Split Oak Forest and Moss Park.

== See also ==
- Environmentally Endangered Lands Programs
