= Zipline (disambiguation) =

A zipline is a pulley suspended on a cable, which allows travel from the top to the bottom of a slope.

Zipline may also refer to:

- Zipline (drone delivery company), an American company that builds and operates small drone aircraft for delivery of medical products
- Zipline Creative, a South Wales-based film, TV, and radio production company

== See also ==
- Zipline Safari, a zip-line course in Florida
