= Florida Trail =

American National Scenic trail

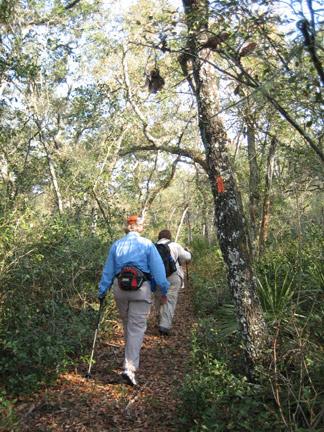
- Hiking the Florida Trail
- Length: 1,500 mi (2,400 km)
- Location: Florida
- Established: October 29, 1966
- Designation: National Scenic Trail
- Trailheads: North: 30.3286°N 87.2896°W; Parking lot, Fort Pickens at Gulf Islands National Seashore; South: 25.8571°N 81.0329°W; Big Cypress Oasis Visitor Center
- Use: Hiking allowed throughout, other non-motorized uses allowed in certain sections by land manager
- Difficulty: Moderate
- Season: Year-round, maintained for seasonal use September through April
- Hazards: Severe weather, alligators, venomous snakes, bears
Trail map

The Florida Trail is one of eleven National Scenic Trails in the United States, created by the National Trails System Act of 1968 (Public Law 90-543). It runs 1,500 miles (2,400 km), from Big Cypress National Preserve (between Miami and Naples, along the Tamiami Trail) to Fort Pickens at Gulf Islands National Seashore on Santa Rosa Island, Florida. Also known as the Florida National Scenic Trail (which applies only to its federally certified segments), the trail provides permanent non-motorized recreation for hiking and other compatible activities within an hour's drive of most Floridians.

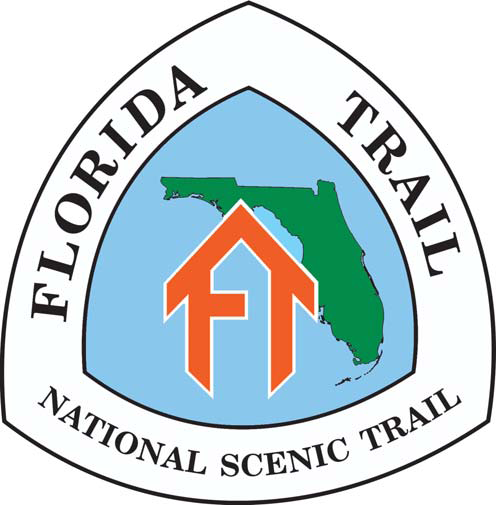
Trail logo

The trail began on October 29, 1966 when members of the Florida Trail Association marked its first blaze at Clearwater Lake Recreation Area in the Ocala National Forest. It was officially designated as a National Scenic Trail in 1983. The U.S. Forest Service, through the National Forests in Florida program, officially oversees the trail but volunteers and land managers throughout the state are responsible for its development, maintenance and management.

== History ==
In the early 1960s, Miami resident Jim Kern founded the Florida Trail Association after hiking the Appalachian Trail with his brother and encouraged members to share his vision of creating something similar across Florida. By October 1966, he received permission from Ocala National Forest managers to start blazing a hiking trail. It was officially designated a National Scenic Trail in 1983. It has been a volunteer-driven construction project ever since, built in disconnected segments in corridors where public land (or easements granted by private individuals) was available.

== Florida National State Trail partners ==
More than 25 agencies and private partners manage the trail. Partnerships, memoranda of understanding and certification agreements between these parties facilitate the project.

=== Land managers ===
- Land managers include the National Park Service, South Florida Water Management District, St. Johns River WMD, Suwannee River WMD, Northwest Florida WMD, US Army Corps of Engineers, US Air Force, Florida Fish and Wildlife Conservation Commission, Forever Florida, Florida Forest Service, Seminole County, US Forest Service, FDEP-Division of Recreation & Parks, Florida Department of Military Affairs, Plum Creek Timber Company, City of Blountstown, Florida Department of Transportation, Nokuse Plantation, Santa Rosa Island Authority, Escambia County, the University of West Florida, and US Fish & Wildlife Service.

=== Stewardship partners ===
The Florida Trail Association is a non-profit partner of the project, administering a volunteer program to construct, maintain, and garner support for the trail.

=== The Florida National Scenic Trail Coalition ===
This coalition was established in 2010 by the forest supervisor of the national forests in Florida to engage a broader group of partners to manage the Trail and serve recreationists. It is composed primarily of agency, district, or company leaders who own or manage the land through which the trail passes. The Florida National Scenic Trail 5-Year Strategic Plan was released in 2012, setting goals for trail completion, standards, partnerships, and trail promotion. Coalition members participate in bi-annual meetings to address emerging issues and to exchange resources such as expertise, funding, and information.

== Florida National Scenic Trail route ==
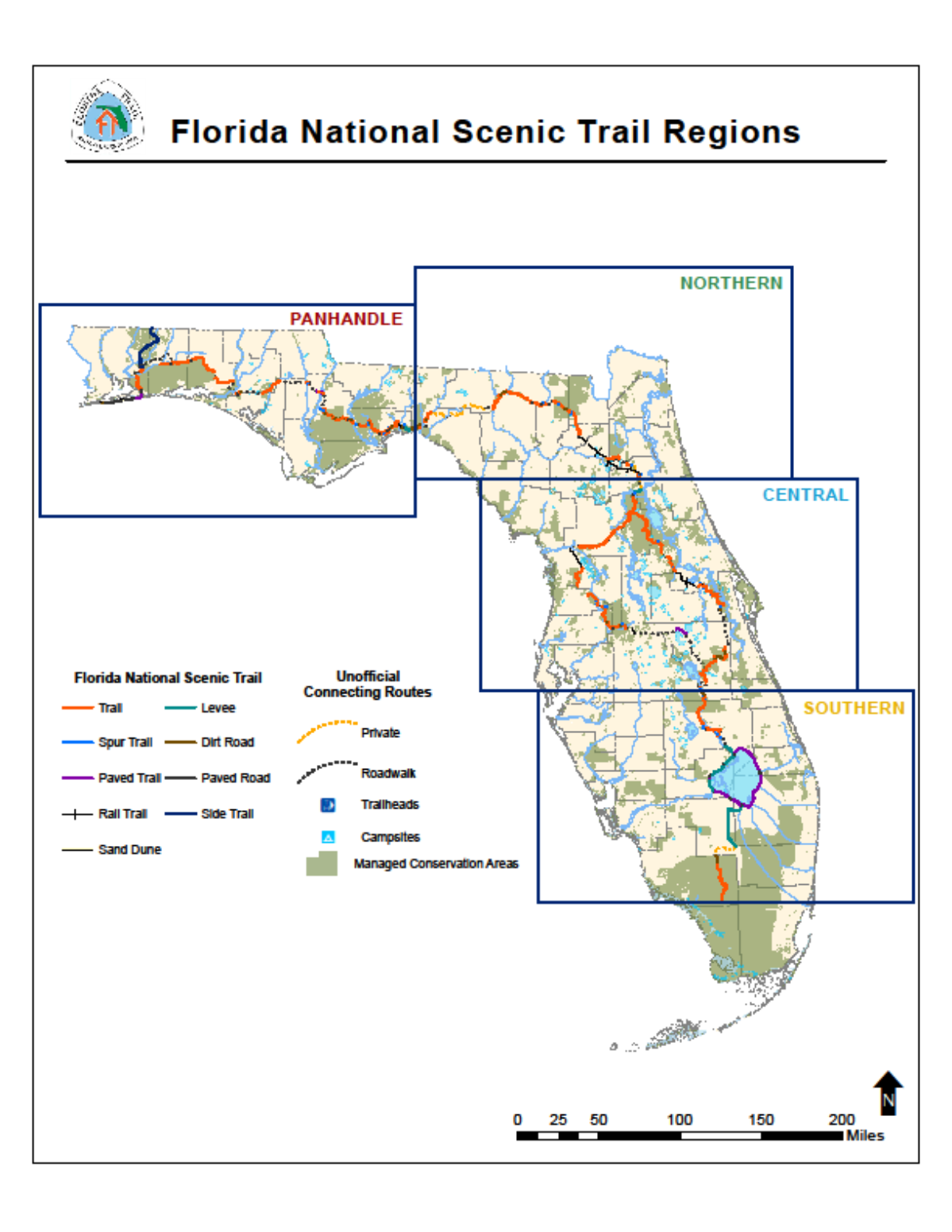
The four regions of the Florida National Scenic Trail.

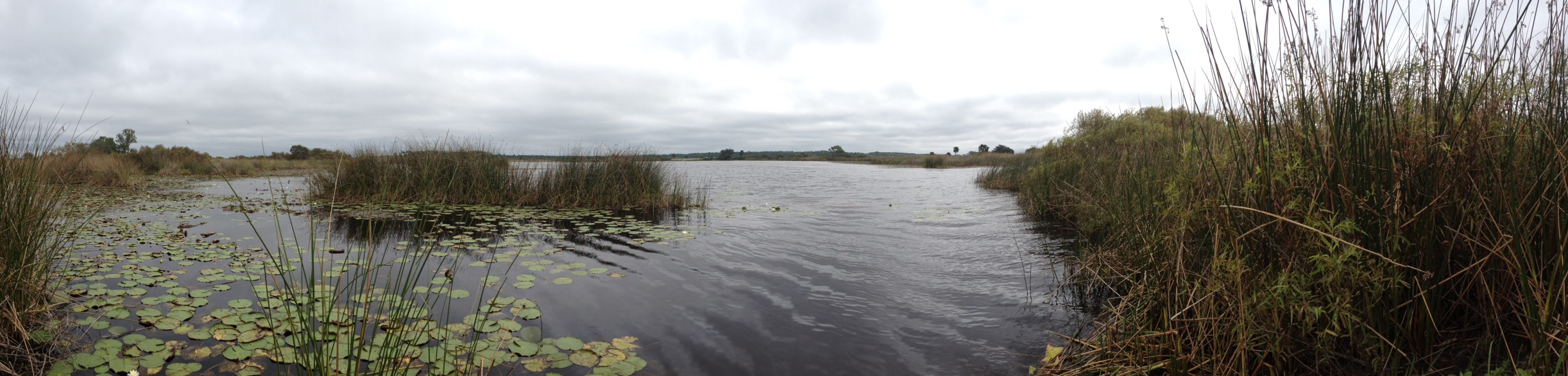
Hiking the Florida National Scenic Trail in St. Marks National Wildlife Refuge

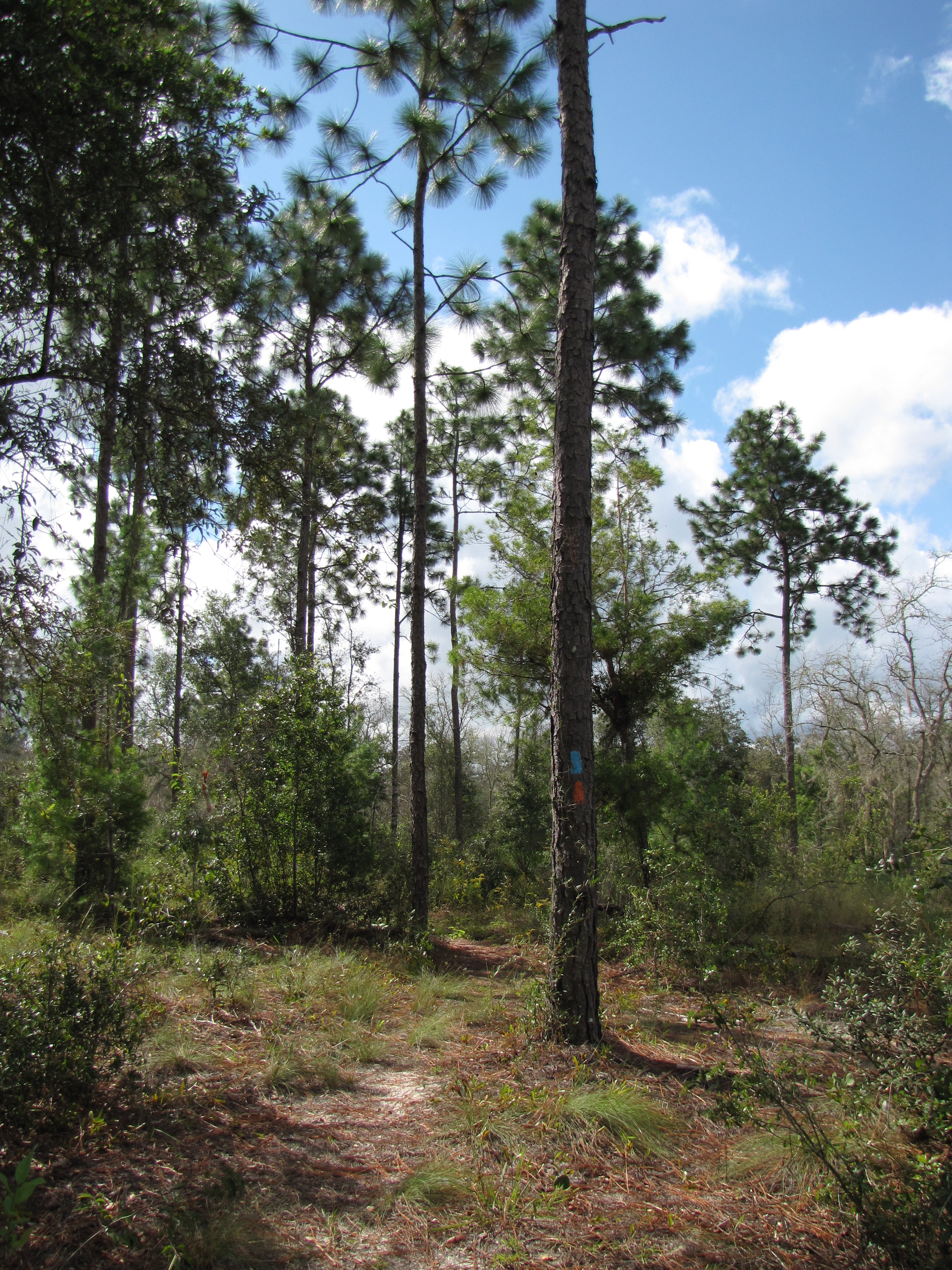
Pinus palustris along the Longleaf Pine Trail section of the Florida National Scenic Trail in the Etoniah Creek State Forest in Putnam County, Florida

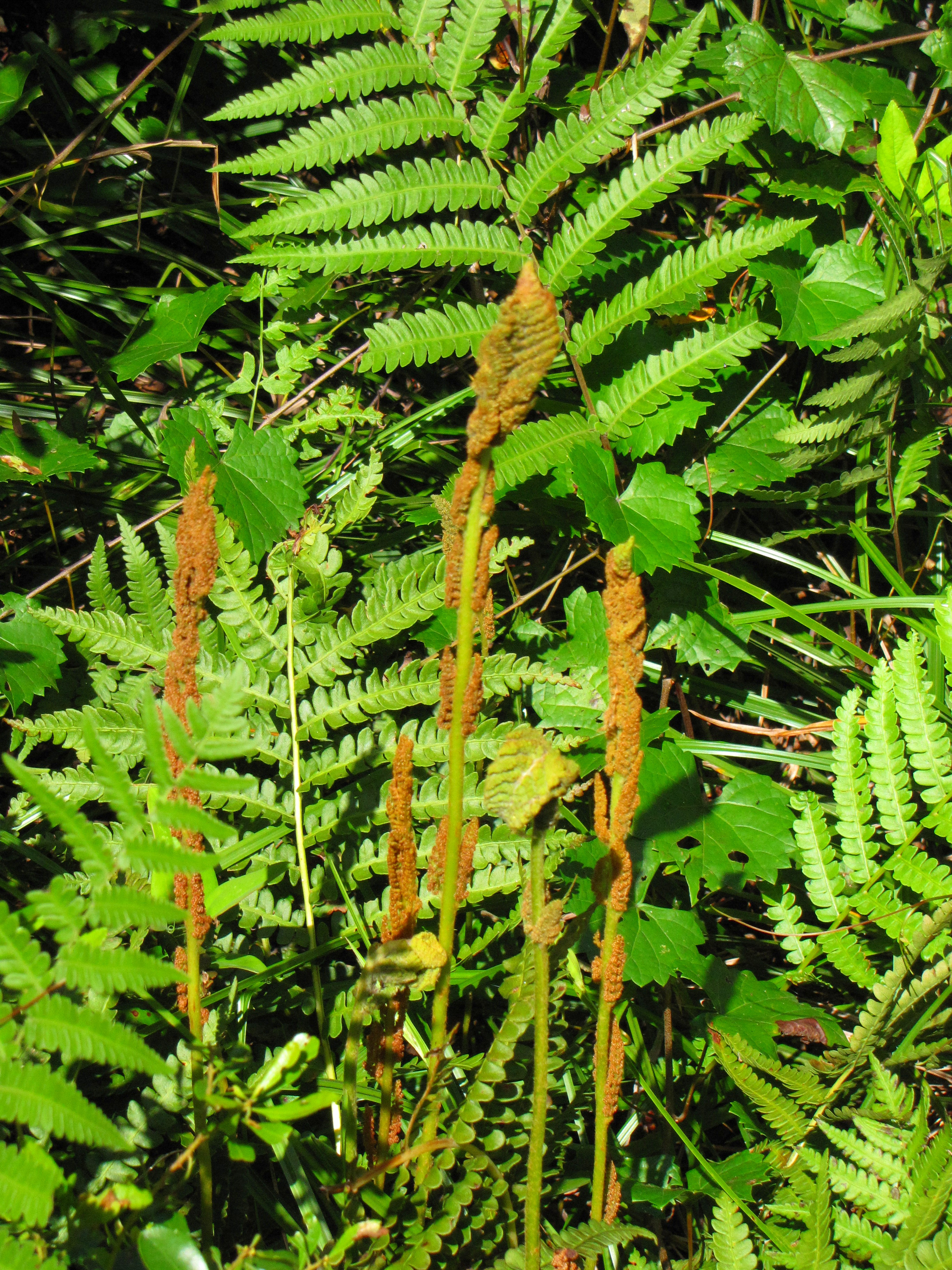
Osmundastrum cinnamomeum along the Longleaf Pine Trail section of the Florida National Scenic Trail in the Etoniah Creek State Forest

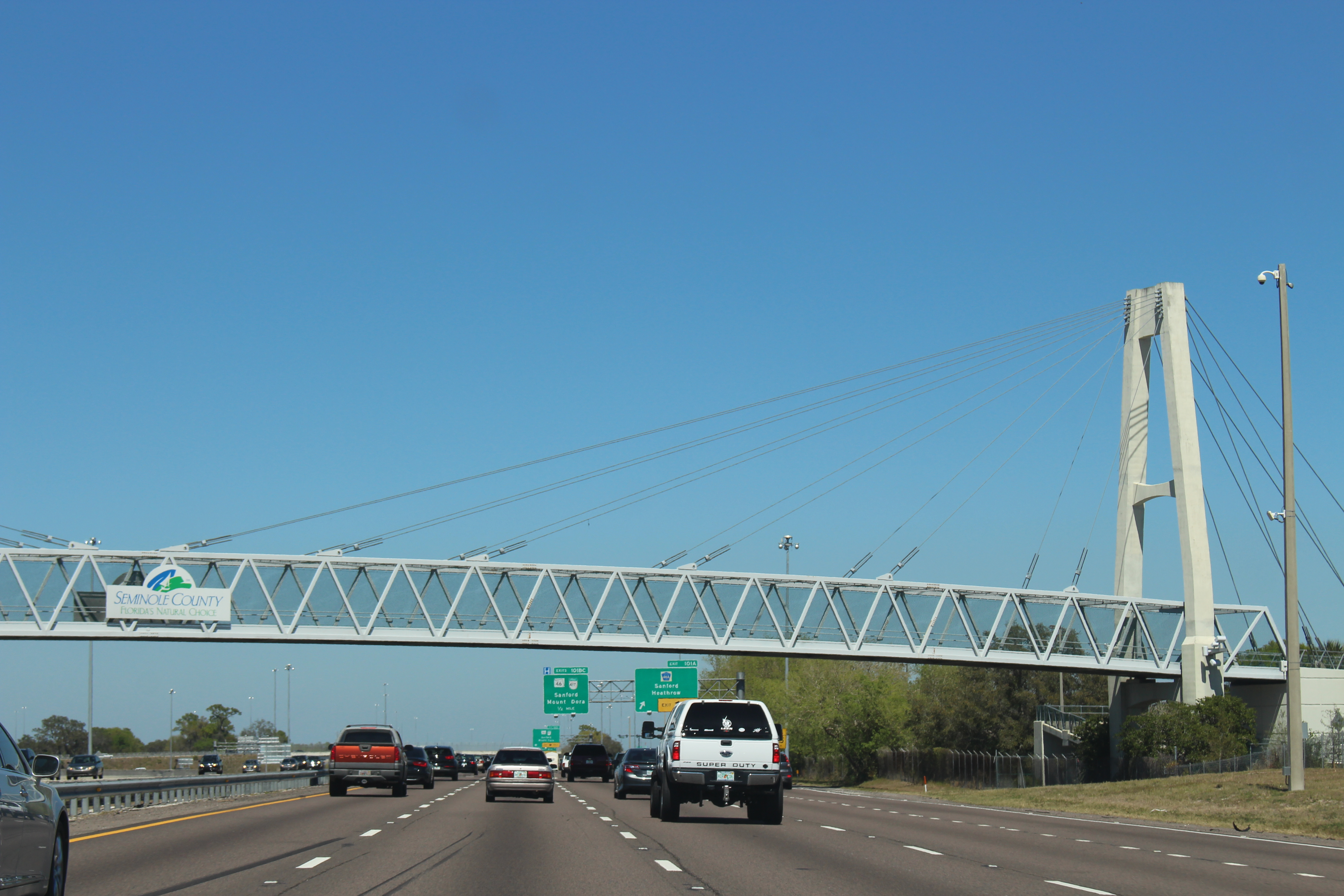
Florida National Scenic Trail crosses Interstate 4 in Lake Mary, Seminole County

The 1,500-mile (2,400 km) trail consists of four main geographic regions:

=== Regions ===
- The Southern Region consists of:
  - Big Cypress National Preserve
  - Miami Canal Levee L1, L2, L3
  - Lake Okeechobee & Okeechobee North
  - Kissimmee River Lands
  - Avon Park Air Force Range
  - KICCO Wildlife Management Area
- The Central Region consists of:
  - Three Lakes Wildlife Management Area
  - Forever Florida
  - Herky Huffman/Bull Creek Wildlife Management Area
  - Tosohatchee Wildlife Management Area
  - Seminole Ranch Conservation Area
  - C.H. Bronson State Forest
  - Mills Creek Woodlands
  - Little Big Econ State Forest & Flagler Trail
  - Cross Seminole Trail
  - Lower Wekiva River Preserve State Park
  - Seminole State Forest
  - Ocala National Forest
  - The Cross Florida Greenway
  - Withlacoochee State Forest
  - Green Swamp Wild Management Area
- The Northern Region consists of:
  - Rice Creek Conservation Area
  - Etoniah Creek State Forest & Palatka-Lake Butler State Trail
  - Plum Creek
  - Osceola National Forest & Olustee Battlefield
  - Fall Creek
  - Forest Service Tracts & Stephen Foster Folk Culture Center State Park
  - Swift Creek Conservation Area & Camp Branch Conservation Area
  - Suwannee River Farms Management Areas
  - Holton Creek Conservation Area & Lower Alapaha Conservation Area
  - Suwannee River State Park
  - Twin Rivers State Forest
  - Aucilla River
- The Panhandle Region consists of:
  - St. Marks National Wildlife Refuge
  - Tallahassee-St. Marks Historic Railroad State Trail
  - Apalachicola National Forest
  - Blountstown Greenway & SR 20
  - Upper Chipola Water Management Area
  - Econfina Creek Water Management Area
  - Pine Log State Forest
  - Nokuse Plantation & Choctawhatchee River Water Management Area
  - Eglin Air Force Base
  - Yellow River Water Management Area
  - Gulf Islands (Gulf Islands National Seashore, Santa Rosa County, Navarre Beach, Pensacola Beach)

=== Additional trails ===
- Blackwater River State Forest & Blackwater River State Park
- Crosby Island Marsh Preserve
- Lake Okeechobee Scenic Trail
- Ocean to Lake Trail
- Split Oak Forest Wildlife and Environmental Area
- Western Corridor

== Flora and fauna ==
Florida is home to a range of environments not seen elsewhere in the world. The Trail crosses swamps, forests, prairies and springs in both urban and remote wilderness areas, traversing a variety of semi-tropical ecosystems.

- Types of Plant Life by Region
  - Southern Region: Cypress swamp, pine, prairies of cabbage palm, saw palmetto, sawgrass, marsh, oak hammocks, and scrub.
  - Central Region: Palmetto prairies, pine flatwoods, ranch land, cypress sloughs, freshwater marshes, scrub, and oak hammocks.
  - Northern Region: Longleaf pine and wiregrass, flatwoods, pine plantations, hardwoods, cypress, and oak hammocks.
  - Panhandle Region: Salt marsh, hardwood hammocks, coastal pine flatwoods, pine savannas, wild ground orchids, pitcher plants, titi swamp, hydrangea, magnolia, liverworts, and dune grasses.
- Types of Wildlife by Region
  - Southern Region: panthers, Florida black bears, cattle, alligators, and a wide variety of birds.
  - Central Region: Sandhill cranes, wood storks, cattle, white-tailed deer, feral hogs, wild turkey, bobwhite quail, river otters, alligators, Red Widow spider, Florida pine snake, black bears, and gopher tortoises.
  - Northern Region: Red-cockaded woodpeckers, gopher tortoises, black bears, eastern cottontail rabbits, wild turkeys, deer, red-tailed hawks, gators, and Gulf sturgeon.
  - Panhandle Region: Waterfowl, bald eagles, ospreys, otters, alligators, deer, black bears, warblers, sea turtles, and piping plovers.
- Caution
  - Seven species of venomous snake live in Florida. Eastern diamondback rattlesnakes, Florida cottonmouths (Agkistrodon conanti), dusky pygmy rattlesnakes and coral snakes are found across the entire state. The eastern copperhead is typically only found in the Panhandle, whereas the timber rattlesnake is found in northeastern and north central parts of the state, with few sightings in the panhandle. The eastern cottonmouth (Agkistrodon piscivorus) is found only in the western edge of the panhandle.
