= Lake Mary Jane, Florida =

Unincorporated area in Florida, US

- Census-designated place
- Interactive map of Lake Mary Jane, Florida
- Coordinates: 28°22′42″N 81°10′08″W
- Country: United States
- State: Florida
- County: Orange

Area
  - Total: 6.12 sq mi (15.85 km^{2})
  - Land: 5.25 sq mi (13.60 km^{2})
  - Water: 0.87 sq mi (2.25 km^{2})
- Elevation: 59 ft (18 m)

Population (2020)
  - Total: 1,790
  - Density: 340.8/sq mi (131.59/km^{2})
- Time zone: UTC-5 (Eastern (EST))
  - Summer (DST): UTC-4 (EDT)
- ZIP code: 32832
- Area codes: 407, 689
- FIPS code: 12-38430
- GNIS ID: 2583358

Lake Mary Jane is a census-designated place and unincorporated area in Orange County, Florida, United States. As of the 2020 census, Lake Mary Jane had a population of 1,790. It is part of the Orlando–Kissimmee Metropolitan Statistical Area.

== History ==
As early as 2013, reports of the invasive apple snail occurred. The species is now established itself within the greater Lake Hart watershed.

In September 2017, strong winds from Hurricane Irma swept over Florida, causing major disruption to Lake Mary Jane. Nearby houses, and recreation institutions such as SORA Rowing (South Orlando Rowing Association) suffered heavy damage to their facilities.

In 2020, the developer Tavistock and the local governing bodies of Orange County and Osceola County, approved a plan to develop a significant portion of the nearby protected Split Oak Forest for new roads and housing communities. Split Oak is home to threatened and endemic species such as the Gopher Tortoise and Florida scrub jay.

== Geography ==
Lake Mary Jane is located in southern Orange County, 23 miles (37 km) southeast of downtown Orlando. The community is located on the east shore of the lake of the same name. The CDP was newly defined for the 2010 census.

According to the United States Census Bureau, the CDP has a total area of 5.3 square miles (13.6 km^{2}), all land.

=== Lake ===
Lake Mary Jane is the namesake of the census-dedicated area. It is large body of water that is part of the Lake Hart watershed, which includes nearby Lake Hart, Lake Whippoorwill, and Lake Nona. There are 3 notable parks and nature reserves bordering the lake. Isle of Pine Preserve on the south-eastern portion, Moss Park on the western portion, and Split Oak Forest on the south-western portion. These lakes are interconnected through a series of canals.

Some notable local wildlife endemic to the area includes but is not limited to animals such as the American alligator, Florida softshell turtle, Florida sand hill cranes, and Florida scrub jays.

== Demographics ==
Historical population
Census	Pop.	Note	%±
2020	1,790		—
U.S. Decennial Census

Lake Mary Jane first appeared as a census designated place in the 2010 U.S. census.

=== 2020 census ===
As of the 2020 census, Lake Mary Jane had a population of 1,790. The median age was 44.7 years. 22.3% of residents were under the age of 18 and 14.6% of residents were 65 years of age or older. For every 100 females there were 113.6 males, and for every 100 females age 18 and over there were 108.2 males age 18 and over.

0.0% of residents lived in urban areas, while 100.0% lived in rural areas.

There were 637 households in Lake Mary Jane, of which 36.6% had children under the age of 18 living in them. Of all households, 70.8% were married-couple households, 13.2% were households with a male householder and no spouse or partner present, and 11.1% were households with a female householder and no spouse or partner present. About 15.8% of all households were made up of individuals and 5.5% had someone living alone who was 65 years of age or older.

There were 667 housing units, of which 4.5% were vacant. The homeowner vacancy rate was 0.7% and the rental vacancy rate was 7.8%.

Racial composition as of the 2020 census
Race	Number	Percent
White	1,355	75.7%
Black or African American	44	2.5%
American Indian and Alaska Native	3	0.2%
Asian	51	2.8%
Native Hawaiian and Other Pacific Islander	1	0.1%
Some other race	64	3.6%
Two or more races	272	15.2%
Hispanic or Latino (of any race)	313	17.5%

== Recreation ==
Lake Mary Jane is lined with private homes alongside its banks often with docks leading out into 3–12 ft water. Popular activities in the Florida lake include fishing, watersports like wakeboarding or tubing, jetskiing, rowing, kayaking, and swimming.

Moss Park is a popular area for nature hikes, picnics, swimming, or as an entry point for watercraft.

The SORA Rowing team (South Orlando Rowing Association) is an established rowing organization of middle school, high school, and adult rowers who compete in a variety of local, state, and national events. Their facilities located within Moss Park include a boathouse, docks, and equipment for the rowers.
