= Tornado outbreak of April 3, 2012 =

Tornado outbreak

- Radar loop of storms affecting Dallas/Fort Worth during the outbreak

Meteorological history
- Duration: 6 hours, 27 minutes

Tornado outbreak
- Tornadoes: 21
- Max. rating: EF3 tornado
- Highest winds: 150 mph (240 km/h) (EF3 tornado near Forney, Texas and Royse City, Texas); 90 mph (140 km/h) (non-tornadic wind gust near Willow Park and Greenville, Texas)
- Largest hail: 3.5 in (89 mm) near Forney

Overall effects
- Injuries: 29
- Damage: ≥$1 billion (estimated)
- Part of the tornado outbreaks of 2012

A localized tornado outbreak affected primarily the Dallas–Fort Worth metroplex on April 3, 2012. During the morning of April 3, a large low-pressure area and associated frontal boundaries tracked across the Southern United States. Initially, environmental conditions did not favor the development of tornadoes. However, an outflow boundary from an area of storms in Oklahoma moved southwards before stalling over the Dallas–Fort Worth area. This allowed the formation of individual supercells, which would produce numerous tornadoes in the region. Many of these tornadoes occurred in the afternoon and evening hours of the day. One of these tornadoes was an EF3 tornado which struck areas of Forney, Texas, damaging or destroying multiple homes and businesses; this tornado would be the strongest confirmed during the outbreak. However, the costliest tornado was of EF2 intensity, and struck the counties of Ellis and Dallas, causing roughly $400 million in damages and damaging or destroying hundreds of homes. The same tornado also injured 10 people, but did not cause any fatalities. Throughout the duration of the outbreak, there were 21 confirmed tornadoes, though 16 of them were rated EF0—the lowest rating on the Enhanced Fujita scale.

Along with the tornadoes, numerous hail and wind reports were received by the Storm Prediction Center (SPC) that day, though it is unclear which were directly associated with the storm complex. However, severe weather in Texas resulted in excess of $1 billion in damages, mostly due to the tornadoes. It was estimated that at least 1,100 homes in the metropolitan area were damaged in the outbreak, including at least 349 that were destroyed. Despite hitting heavily populated areas, however, no deaths were reported. However, a total of 29 injuries were confirmed.

== Meteorological synopsis ==
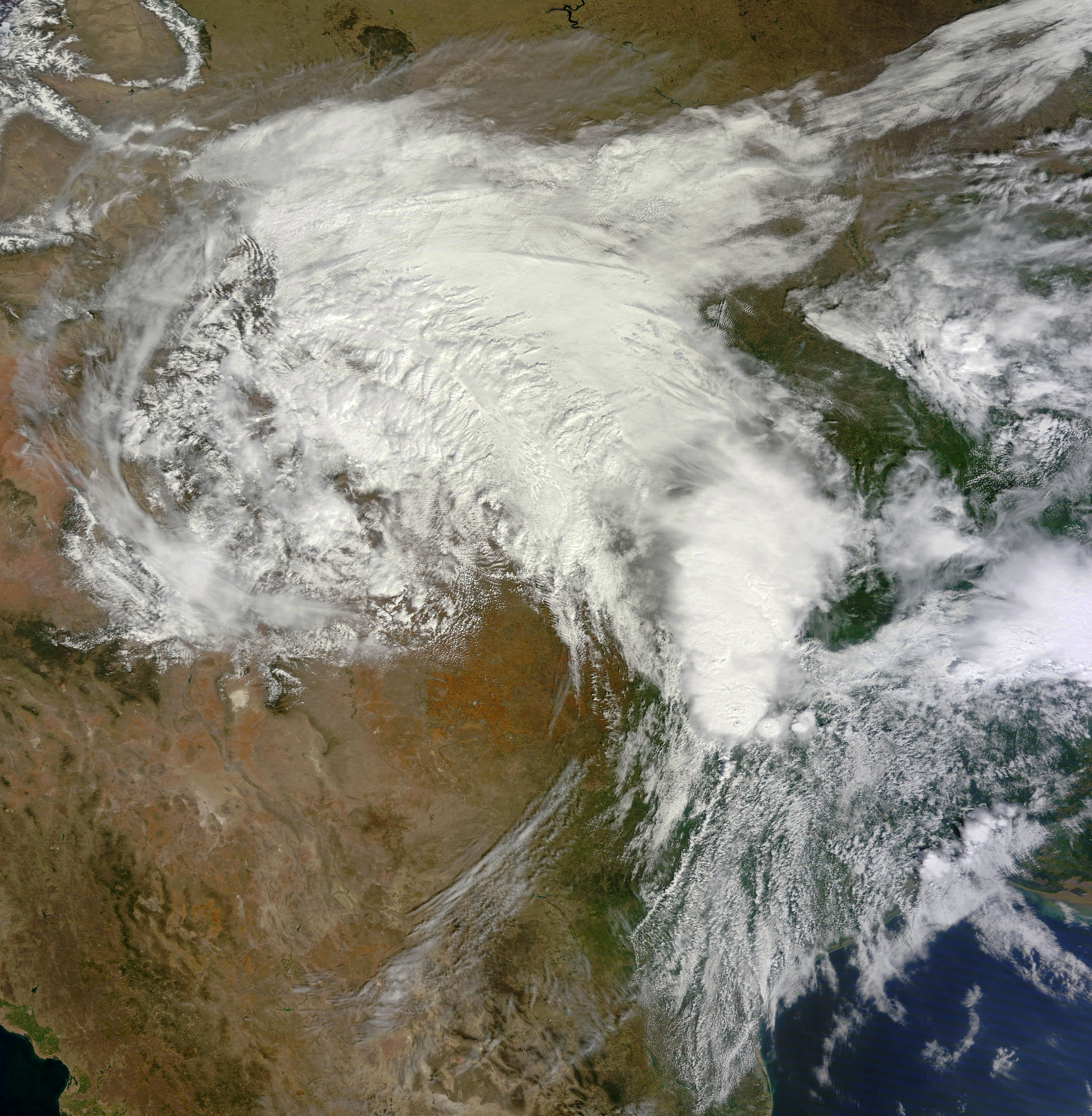
Satellite image of the low-pressure area and frontal supercells associated with the outbreak

A low pressure system and associated frontal boundaries tracked across the Southern Plains on April 3. The large-scale synoptics were marginal for tornadoes, hence only a slight risk of severe weather was issued by the Storm Prediction Center in Norman, Oklahoma, with large hail the primary threat and tornadoes and damaging winds secondary threats. As a result of the initially perceived low risk, only a severe thunderstorm watch was initially issued for the region at 9:20 am CDT (1420 UTC). Once the small-scale synoptics became more conducive for tornado activity, the watch was upgraded to a tornado watch for North Texas at 12:10 pm CDT (1720 UTC).

What was initially believed to be a wind and hail event from reliable models and forecast unexpectedly developed into a locally significant tornado outbreak as a result of changing mesoscale situations, concentrated on the heavily populated Dallas–Fort Worth metroplex. That development was attributed to an outflow boundary from another area of storms farther north in Oklahoma that tracked southward across the Red River and into the Metroplex where it stalled just south of the Interstate 20 corridor in the southern suburbs, allowing discrete supercells to form along the boundary. The boundary increased low-level wind shear significantly due to easterly winds, allowing for tornadoes to develop. As a result, taking advantage of the highly unstable environment that became much more highly sheared than initially forecasted with high CAPE values, the storms became much more intense than forecasted and quickly became tornadic and intense, resulting in severe damage across the region in heavily populated areas. South of the boundary, shear was much more marginal and tornadoes did not develop. Once the cells tracked eastward towards Louisiana, the atmosphere was much more stable and the cells rapidly weakened.

== Confirmed tornadoes ==
Confirmed tornadoes by Enhanced Fujita rating
EFU	EF0	EF1	EF2	EF3	EF4	EF5	Total
0	16	1	2	2	0	0	21

=== April 3 event ===
List of confirmed tornadoes – Tuesday, April 3, 2012 (Note: All dates are based on the local time zone where the tornado touched down; however, all times are in Coordinated Universal Time for consistency.)
EF#	Location	County / Parish	State	Start Coord.	Time (UTC)	Path length	Max width	Summary
EF1	N of Cleburne	Johnson	TX	32.35°N 97.40°W	17:41–17:43	1.16 miles (1.87 km)	60 yd (55 m)	Three manufactured homes were damaged, one of which lost its roof and an exterior wall. A horse trailer was overturned, a barn sustained roof damage, and two riding lawnmowers sustained damage. Damages totaled $60,000.
EF2	Oak Leaf to Southern Dallas	Ellis, Dallas	TX	32.60°N 96.75°W	18:00–18:35	13.7 miles (22.0 km)	200 yd (180 m)	In Oak Leaf, minor tree and shingle damage occurred before the tornado struck Lancaster and the southern fringes of Dallas at high-end EF2 strength. Many homes in Lancaster sustained severe damage or were destroyed, some of which lost roofs and exterior walls. Vehicles were moved and damaged, trees were downed, an RV was destroyed, and fence boards were speared into homes. Three buildings were damaged at an apartment complex, one of which had its roof torn off. The Cedar Valley Christian Academy was also heavily damaged and lost an exterior wall. A news helicopter broadcast live video as the tornado struck a Schneider National terminal and lofted several semi-trailers high into the air. Over 50 semi-trailers were damaged or destroyed, one of which was thrown into a house. Sixty-four homes were destroyed, and 109 others were damaged. Ten people were injured, two seriously. Damage was $400 million.
EF0	ENE of Burleson	Johnson	TX	32.54°N 97.28°W	18:08–18:09	0.27 miles (430 m)	50 yd (46 m)	Brief touchdown over an open field caused no damage.
EF2	Kennedale to Arlington	Tarrant	TX	32.63°N 97.22°W	18:21–18:40	6.4 miles (10.3 km)	150 yd (140 m)	A damaging multiple-vortex tornado caused high-end EF2 damage in Kennedale and Arlington. Five manufactured homes were destroyed at the beginning of the path near the Texas Raceway. Several businesses in Kennedale sustained damage, including a storage facility and a warehouse building that had a large portion of its roof torn off and tossed onto a water tower. Many apartments and homes in this area were damaged, some severely. Crossing into Arlington, the tornado caused damage to numerous additional houses and apartment buildings. Loss of roofs and exterior walls occurred, and a few two story homes sustained total destruction of their top floors. A nursing home had a large portion of its roof torn off and sustained damage to exterior walls, and a church was also damaged. Many trees and power poles were snapped along the path. Eighteen homes were destroyed and 291 others were damaged. Eight injuries occurred, one of which was serious. Damage was $200 million.
EF0	Eastern Dallas	Dallas	TX	32.78°N 96.69°W	18:54–18:55	0.09 miles (0.14 km)	25 yd (23 m)	A brief tornado touched down near Skyline High School, damaging trees and the roof of one house.
EF0	Northern Grand Prairie	Tarrant	TX	32.77°N 97.06°W	18:58–19:00	0.47 miles (0.76 km)	60 yd (55 m)	This brief tornado touched down in the northern part of Grand Prairie, damaging the roofs of a few warehouse buildings and a strip mall. A few light poles and power poles were blown over as well.
EF0	Northwestern Irving	Dallas	TX	32.86°N 96.98°W	19:08–19:13	1.31 miles (2.11 km)	30 yd (27 m)	This tornado struck Townsell Elementary School, where HVAC units were torn off the roof and a gas line was ruptured. The roof of a Goodwill store was damaged, and a house sustained awning damage. Trees and fences were downed, power poles were bent over, and a road sign was blown over as well.
EF0	Coppell	Dallas	TX	32.95°N 96.99°W	19:23–19:28	2.02 miles (3.25 km)	75 yd (69 m)	This tornado damaged a gas station awning and the roofs of several homes along a narrow, intermittent path through Coppell.
EF0	S of Denton	Denton	TX	33.16°N 97.14°W	19:40–19:41	0.21 miles (0.34 km)	50 yd (46 m)	Brief tornado touched down in an open field, causing no damage.
EF0	W of Cumby	Hunt	TX	33.1215°N 95.8967°W	20:20–20:21	0.3 miles (0.48 km)	25 yd (23 m)	A brief tornado occurred over open country, causing no damage.
EF0	Mesquite	Dallas	TX	32.77°N 96.60°W	20:22–20:24	0.28 miles (0.45 km)	30 yd (27 m)	This brief tornado touched down near the Mesquite Rodeo Arena. Several trees and tree limbs were downed, and houses sustained minor roof damage. An automotive business collapse of a masonry exterior wall. Two people were injured.
EF0	SW of Sulphur Springs	Hopkins	TX	33.08°N 95.66°W	20:24–20:25	0.12 miles (0.19 km)	25 yd (23 m)	This tornado remained over open country, causing no damage.
EF3	Forney	Kaufman	TX	32.75°N 96.47°W	20:33–20:39	7.73 miles (12.44 km)	150 yd (140 m)	This intense EF3 tornado caused major damage in Forney. At its initial touchdown point in downtown Forney, numerous trees were snapped and uprooted, the roof of a fire station was damaged, an outbuilding was destroyed, while other buildings sustained roof and window damage. A dry cleaning business suffered significant damage to its roof and signs. Several industrial buildings also sustained minor damage. The most intense damage occurred in the Diamond Creek subdivision, where several homes were completely destroyed and others sustained major structural damage. A few of these homes were nearly leveled, with only small portions of interior walls left intact. Vehicles were tossed and damaged in the parking lot at Crosby Elementary School, one of which was lofted 300 yards into a field. The school building itself sustained mainly roof damage. Seven people were injured, and damages amounted to $100 million.
EF0	N of Sulphur Springs	Hopkins	TX	33.13°N 95.60°W	20:54–20:55	0.58 miles (0.93 km)	50 yd (46 m)	Trees, power poles, and power lines were downed.
EF3	SE of Royse City	Rockwall, Hunt	TX	32.91°N 96.33°W	20:56–21:04	3.34 miles (5.38 km)	400 yd (370 m)	A large EF3 wedge tornado moved through a subdivision near Royse City, severely damaging or destroying multiple homes. In the subdivision, a home sustained mid-range EF3 damage as all of its exterior walls collapsed. A cabinet factory building sustained major structural damage, and other industrial buildings and a gas station were also damaged. Large amounts of structural debris from this area was scattered long distances through fields. Barns and mobile homes were completely destroyed and vehicles were tossed, one of which was thrown into the back of a house. A few additional homes were also sustained major damage farther along the path, and vegetation and trees were defoliated and debarked in some areas. Eight homes were destroyed and 26 others were damaged. Three people were injured. Peak wind speeds were estimated at 150 mph.
EF0	S of Greenville	Hunt	TX	33.04°N 96.14°W	21:27–21:29	0.57 miles (0.92 km)	50 yd (46 m)	A brief tornado remained over open country and caused no damage.
EF0	E of Hagansport	Franklin	TX	33.35°N 95.14°W	21:39–21:45	0.84 miles (1.35 km)	25 yd (23 m)	This tornado uprooted trees near the Sulphur River.
EF0	S of Clarksville	Red River	TX	33.46°N 95.06°W	21:41–21:45	1.41 miles (2.27 km)	25 yd (23 m)	Several trees were snapped or uprooted along the path.
EF0	SW of De Kalb	Bowie	TX	33.43°N 94.71°W	21:44–21:50	2.24 miles (3.60 km)	50 yd (46 m)	Several trees were snapped or uprooted along the path.
EF0	NW of Winnsboro	Hopkins	TX	33.01°N 95.36°W	22:36–22:37	0.54 miles (0.87 km)	25 yd (23 m)	Minor tree damage occurred along the path.
EF0	ESE of Rodessa	Caddo	LA	32.97°N 93.98°W	00:08–00:13	3.08 miles (4.96 km)	50 yd (46 m)	Several trees were snapped or uprooted, some of which fell on buildings. One outbuilding was directly damaged by the tornado.
Sources: SPC Storm Reports for 04/03/12, NWS Dallas/Fort Worth, NWS Shreveport, LA, NCDC Storm Events Database

== Aftermath ==
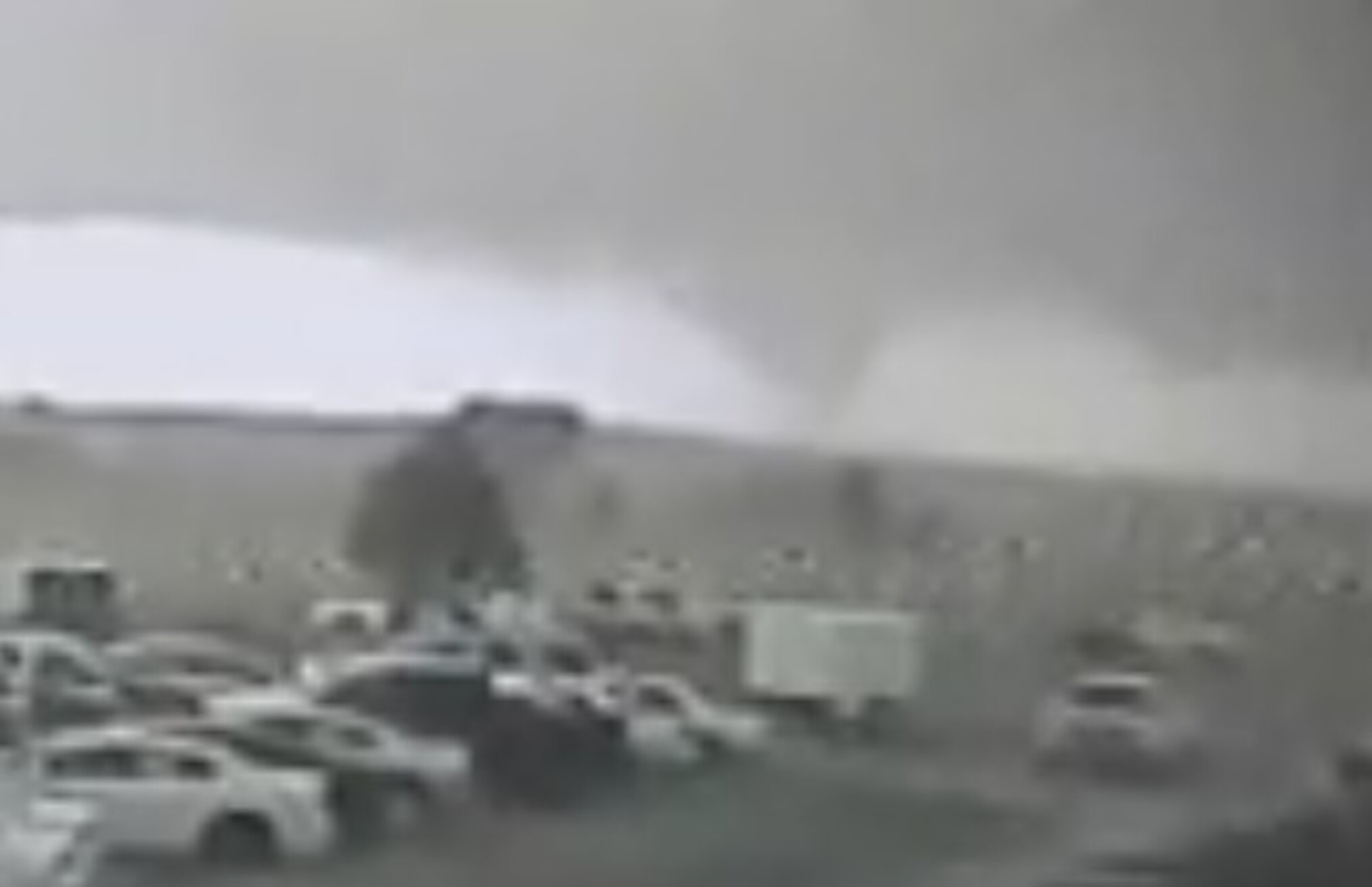
A security camera still of an EF3 tornado north of Royse City, Texas

The city of Kennedale was one of the first to declare itself a disaster area on April 3, 2012, just a few hours after one of the first tornadoes to hit the Dallas–Fort Worth metroplex area struck their town. Kennedale made the disaster declaration official on April 4, 2012. Both mayors Bryan Lankhorst of Kennedale and Robert Cluck of Arlington signed disaster declarations for their cities. These declarations paved the way for Texas Governor Rick Perry to declare Dallas, Kaufman, and Tarrant counties disaster areas on Thursday, April 5, 2012.

== See also ==
- List of North American tornadoes and tornado outbreaks
- April 1994 tornado outbreak – On April 25, 1994, a tornado outbreak hit the Dallas–Fort Worth area, spawning 25 tornadoes that day and causing three deaths locally in Lancaster.
- 2000 Fort Worth tornado – On March 28, 2000, two tornadoes caused massive damage to downtown Fort Worth, as well as damage to the cities of Arlington and Grand Prairie.
- December 2015 North American storm complex – On December 26, 2015, 12 tornadoes struck around the Dallas–Fort Worth metroplex, including a couple of devastating tornadoes striking southern Dallas County and Garland/Rowlett. Thirteen deaths were reported.
- Tornado outbreak of October 20–22, 2019 – On October 20, 2019, discrete supercells spawned across North Texas producing several tornadoes, including an EF3 tornado in North Dallas and Richardson.
