= List of tornadoes in the 2008 Super Tuesday tornado outbreak =

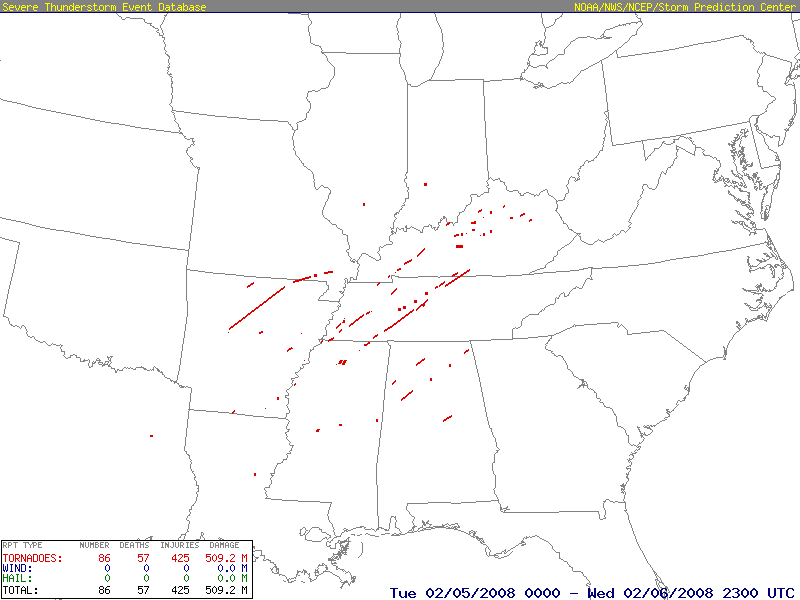
Tracks of all confirmed tornadoes that touched down during the Super Tuesday Outbreak

This is a complete list of the reported and confirmed tornadoes in the 2008 Super Tuesday tornado outbreak, which took place on February 5 and 6, 2008 across a large portion of the southern United States and the lower Ohio Valley. The event began on Super Tuesday, while 24 U.S. states were holding primary elections and caucuses to select the presidential candidates for the upcoming presidential election. During a 12-hour period, 87 tornadoes were produced in nine states. Five tornadoes were rated EF4 on the Enhanced Fujita Scale and five others were rated EF3. There were 57 fatalities across four states, becoming the deadliest tornado outbreak in the United States since May 31, 1985.

== Confirmed tornadoes ==
Confirmed tornadoes by Enhanced Fujita rating
EFU	EF0	EF1	EF2	EF3	EF4	EF5	Total
0	31	30	16	5	5	0	87

=== February 5 event ===
List of confirmed tornadoes – Tuesday, February 5, 2008 (Note: All dates are based on the local time zone where the tornado touched down; however, all times are in Coordinated Universal Time for consistency.)
EF#	Location	County / Parish	State	Start Coord.	Time (UTC)	Path length	Max width	Damage (Note: All damage totals are in 2008 USD unless otherwise stated.)	Summary
EF1	Southern Hamburg	Ashley	AR	33.2062°N 91.799°W	2126–2127	0.62 mi (1.00 km)	50 yd (46 m)	$40,000	A high school had a portion of its roof peeled back. Several trees were snapped or uprooted.
EF0	S of Dermott	Chicot	AR	33.4781°N 91.4471°W	2204–2205	1.1 mi (1.8 km)	50 yd (46 m)	$0	A couple of trees were downed.
EF0	SW of Helena	Phillips	AR	34.46°N 90.71°W	2227–2228	0.16 mi (0.26 km)	25 yd (23 m)	$0	A brief tornado caused no damage.
EF0	E of Rosedale	Bolivar	MS	33.8319°N 90.972°W	2245–2248	3.43 mi (5.52 km)	50 yd (46 m)	$70,000	A few trees were uprooted, the roof was ripped off a mobile home, and a large gas storage tank was rolled.
EF4	NE of New Neely to Atkins to Mountain View to NE of Highland	Yell, Pope, Conway, Van Buren, Stone, Izard, Sharp	AR	35.0975°N 93.0733°W	2249–0056	121.84 mi (196.08 km)	1,320 yd (1,210 m)	$119,310,000	13 deaths – See article on this tornado – 140 people were injured.
EF1	NNE of Arp	Smith	TX	32.2434°N 95.0635°W	2250–2252	1 mi (1.6 km)	300 yd (270 m)	$30,000	A barn was destroyed, many trees were snapped or uprooted, and downed power lines sparked a grass fire.
EF2	NW of Arlington	Shelby, Tipton	TN	35.3097°N 89.7592°W	2300–2311	8.09 mi (13.02 km)	150 yd (140 m)	$1,005,000	This tornado moved through multiple semi-rural subdivisions outside of Arlington, causing considerable damage to homes. Houses had roofs ripped off, brick veneer dislodged, windows blown out, and one home had its entire second floor destroyed. Large trees were snapped and uprooted along the path, and two power line support towers were knocked down while another was twisted. One person was injured.
EF2	SE of Yellville to W of Mountain Home	Marion, Baxter	AR	36.2073°N 92.6219°W	2302–2316	12.5 mi (20.1 km)	880 yd (800 m)	$17,500,000	1 death – This tornado moved directly through the town of Gassville, where significant damage to homes occurred and a mobile home park was severely impacted, killing an elderly woman at that location. Several business in Gassville were heavily damaged, including a gas station. Numerous trees were snapped, some of which had large amounts of debris and sheet metal wrapped around them, and a gas leak was reported in town. 21 frame homes were destroyed, 26 sustained major damage, and 40 sustained minor damage. 12 mobile homes were destroyed, 15 sustained major damage, and 12 sustained minor damage. Many power lines and power poles were downed as well, and 36 people were injured.
EF0	SE of Covington	Tipton	TN	35.4705°N 89.5857°W	2318–2319	0.17 mi (0.27 km)	50 yd (46 m)	$7,000	Power poles and power lines were downed.
EF0	E of Norfolk	DeSoto	MS	34.945°N 90.22°W	2318–2321	2.64 mi (4.25 km)	100 yd (91 m)	$50,000	A farm building roof and pivot irrigation system were damaged, and power poles were downed.
EF1	W of Charleston	Tipton	TN	35.4951°N 89.5462°W	2323–2324	0.73 mi (1.17 km)	50 yd (46 m)	$75,000	One trailer home was destroyed and another was damaged. A house was severely damaged and a trailer to an 18-wheeler was flipped.
EF0	W of Casa	Yell	AR	35.0333°N 93.1138°W	2331–2332	0.6 mi (0.97 km)	30 yd (27 m)	Unknown	Trees were downed on a private property.
EF1	E of Covington	Tipton	TN	35.5774°N 89.5241°W	2332–2333	0.29 mi (0.47 km)	50 yd (46 m)	$50,000	A trailer home was destroyed and an adjacent home was damaged.
EF2	Southaven, MS to Memphis, TN	DeSoto (MS), Shelby (TN)	MS, TN	34.9754°N 90.0086°W	2332–2345	10.24 mi (16.48 km)	440 yd (400 m)	$128,400,000	3 deaths – See section on this tornado – A total of 13 people were injured.
EF0	ESE of Sardis	Panola	MS	34.4069°N 89.7384°W	2353–2354	0.2 mi (0.32 km)	25 yd (23 m)	$12,000	A tractor was flipped, a shed was destroyed, and trees sustained minor damage.
EF1	NE of Palmersville	Weakley, Henry	TN	36.4232°N 88.5298°W	2355–0002	5.09 mi (8.19 km)	150 yd (140 m)	$160,000	Three barns and a shop building were destroyed. Several houses and mobile homes sustained varying degrees of damage. Numerous trees were snapped or uprooted.
EF1	NW of Oxford	Lafayette	MS	34.4307°N 89.6522°W	2357–0004	6.89 mi (11.09 km)	25 yd (23 m)	$25,000	Many structures were damaged and numerous trees were snapped or uprooted.
EF3	N of Oxford	Lafayette	MS	34.4071°N 89.5288°W	2357–0007	7.15 mi (11.51 km)	1,000 yd (910 m)	$35,000,000	This strong wedge tornado destroyed a Caterpillar plant, a county owned warehouse, an Ability Works Incorporated plant, a church, and a veterinary clinic along its path. A lumber company was severely damaged as well. 11 homes were destroyed and 15 others suffered heavy damage. 10 mobile homes were destroyed or heavily damaged as well. Nine commercial structures were destroyed with another 6 sustaining heavy damage. 2,500 acres (110,000,000 sq ft) of trees were snapped or uprooted in the Holly Springs National Forest, and about 70 structures were damaged or destroyed in total. Fourteen people were injured.
EF0	Eads	Shelby, Fayette	TN	35.204°N 89.667°W	0002–0009	4.9 mi (7.9 km)	50 yd (46 m)	$50,000	Tornado touchdown in a suburban area caused roof and gutter damage to homes and damaged a gazebo. Eads Elementary School lost a significant amount of roof shingles, and some trees were snapped and uprooted.
EF0	SSW of Salem (1st tornado)	Marion	IL	38.5067°N 88.9962°W	0012–0013	0.11 mi (0.18 km)	40 yd (37 m)	Unknown	A machine shed sustained severe damage, with several of its walls collapsed, the attached awning upturned, and the roof lifted and tossed.
EF0	SSW of Salem (2nd tornado)	Marion	IL	38.5115°N 88.9977°W	0012–0013	0.22 mi (0.35 km)	30 yd (27 m)	Unknown	Moderate damage was inflicted to a machine shed, and an adjacent home had two uprooted trees laid across its roof.
EF3	SSW of Stanton to W of Jackson	Fayette, Haywood, Madison	TN	35.3697°N 89.3712°W	0021–0054	31.13 mi (50.10 km)	600 yd (550 m)	$10,300,000	3 deaths – See section on this tornado – 14 people were injured.
EF1	NE of Murray	Calloway	KY	36.6384°N 88.1571°W	0025–0028	1.43 mi (2.30 km)	150 yd (140 m)	$35,000	One home sustained damage to its shingles while another had its interior ceilings blown out, its interior significantly damaged, and its windows shattered.
EF0	WNW of Ripley	Tippah	MS	34.7604°N 89.0528°W	0036–0037	1.35 mi (2.17 km)	50 yd (46 m)	$50,000	Two homes and two vehicles were damaged. Numerous trees were downed.
EF1	S of Canton	Trigg	KY	36.76°N 87.96°W	0045–0046	0.08 mi (0.13 km)	40 yd (37 m)	$8,000	Trees were snapped and uprooted.
EF0	SE of Walnut	Tippah	MS	34.8873°N 88.8739°W	0050–0053	2.48 mi (3.99 km)	50 yd (46 m)	$100,000	A few barns and storage buildings were destroyed, a few homes sustained minor damage, and many trees were downed; a fallen tree knocked down half of a brick chimney.
EF1	S of Cadiz	Trigg	KY	36.8062°N 87.88°W	0050–0100	5.56 mi (8.95 km)	150 yd (140 m)	$60,000	The roof was partially blown off one home while others sustained lesser damage. A barn was shifted slightly off its foundation, and trees were snapped or uprooted.
EF1	ESE of Walnut	Alcorn	MS	34.9192°N 88.7856°W	0056–0059	2.56 mi (4.12 km)	100 yd (91 m)	$250,000	Six mobile homes were impacted, of which two were completely destroyed and two others sustained severe damage. Several vehicles and an RV were tossed. Three houses, a church, and a cemetery sustained damage, and numerous trees were downed. Four people were injured.
EF4	Northern Jackson	Madison	TN	35.6772°N 88.8646°W	0059–0107	7.61 mi (12.25 km)	125 yd (114 m)	$100,000,000	See article on this tornado – 51 people were injured.
EF1	E of Vilonia	Faulkner, White	AR	35.0712°N 92.1407°W	0105–0112	5.46 mi (8.79 km)	100 yd (91 m)	$140,000	A barn and a mobile home were destroyed, part of an old chicken house was collapsed, and trees and power lines were downed.
EF2	NNW of Hopkinsville	Christian	KY	36.9614°N 87.6479°W	0109–0125	14.06 mi (22.63 km)	275 yd (251 m)	$4,400,000	Seventeen houses (including at least five mobile homes) were destroyed and 27 were damaged. Nineteen garages, sheds, and barns were damaged or destroyed. Two people were injured.
EF2	Spring Creek	Madison	TN	35.7655°N 88.6877°W	0113–0114	0.38 mi (0.61 km)	150 yd (140 m)	$200,000	One home had its entire roof ripped off and front exterior wall partially collapsed; three other homes sustained extensive roof damage. Large trees were snapped or uprooted.
EF1	Eastview	McNairy	TN	35.07°N 88.6123°W	0113–0122	8.95 mi (14.40 km)	150 yd (140 m)	$250,000	One business was destroyed and another was damaged. A mobile home was destroyed and two houses sustained roof damage. Numerous trees were downed.
EF0	W of Colt	St. Francis	AR	35.1348°N 90.8502°W	0119–0120	0.1 mi (0.16 km)	25 yd (23 m)	$1,000	A brief tornado was reported.
EF1	NW of Pocahontas, AR to W of Naylor, MO	Randolph (AR), Ripley (MO)	AR, MO	36.4235°N 91.1749°W	0120–0148	31.92 mi (51.37 km)	200 yd (180 m)	$280,000	Several homes were impacted, including one that was destroyed. Four to five mobile homes were damaged or destroyed, a manufactured home and a cabin were moved off their foundations, a large metal building sustained severe damage, and a garage was impacted. An old barn was knocked over, and numerous trees were snapped or uprooted.
EF0	NW of Junction City	Union	AR	33.02°N 92.7645°W	0130–0136	7 mi (11 km)	100 yd (91 m)	$200,000	Several porches and awnings were destroyed, many trees were snapped, and several structures sustained roof damage (including a church that sustained severe damage to its roof).
EF4	NW of Savannah to SW of Clifton	Hardin	TN	35.2676°N 88.2926°W	0140–0157	16.17 mi (26.02 km)	880 yd (800 m)	$17,600,000	3 deaths – This large wedge tornado destroyed 59 houses, 11 mobile homes, 11 public buildings, a vacant store, and 11 farm buildings. This included a few frame homes that were leveled or swept from their foundations. Another 117 structures received varying degrees of damage. Violent damage was observed at Sharon Baptist Church, where five buildings were destroyed. This included a 550-seat sanctuary housed in a large, well-built metal frame building that was completely flattened. Large, well-anchored steel beams were completely ripped out of the structure's slab foundation, which had some sections pushed clean of debris and metal framing. A nearby church school building was partially leveled as well, and metal light poles in the parking lot were twisted off at the base and blown away. Vehicles were tossed and destroyed, and a boat was hurled through the exterior wall of a brick mansion that was badly damaged in the tornado. Hundreds of trees along the Tennessee River were snapped and shredded, and five people were injured. All three fatalities occurred in mobile homes.
EF3	SW Greenville to N of Martwick	Muhlenberg	KY	37.1591°N 87.2314°W	0144–0201	18.05 mi (29.05 km)	375 yd (343 m)	$21,300,000	3 deaths – This strong tornado struck the neighboring towns of Greenville and Powderly, destroying 48 homes and mobile homes and severely damaging 32 others in the area. A half dozen businesses and churches were damaged, including a hotel and a car dealership. A high school sustained damage to its gymnasium roof. One building in an industrial park was flattened, with another building being severely damaged. Numerous trees were downed, some of which landed on roads and vehicles in the Central City area. All three fatalities took place in a mobile home park. In total, 69 homes were destroyed and 203 were damaged along the path. Twenty-four people were injured.
EF0	E of Clarendon	Monroe	AR	34.68°N 91.2314°W	0148–0156	7.96 mi (12.81 km)	75 yd (69 m)	$15,000	Several dozen trees were snapped or downed, power lines were downed, and a few roofs lost shingles.
EF0	SW of Moro	Lee	AR	34.7451°N 91.0893°W	0159–0200	0.09 mi (0.14 km)	25 yd (23 m)	$1,000	A tree was snapped.
EF1	S of Harviell	Butler	MO	36.6332°N 90.5159°W	0203–0209	3.38 mi (5.44 km)	300 yd (270 m)	$100,000	Large trees and tree limbs were snapped off, some of which fell onto cars and homes. An old barn was blown over, and a newer barn lost part of its roof and a large door. Several grain bins were dented by wind-blown debris, and an equipment shed was blown away. Several homes had shingle damage, and power poles were snapped.
EF1	SE of Big Sandy	Benton	TN	36.2022°N 88.0768°W	0205–0210	2.02 mi (3.25 km)	50 yd (46 m)	$0	Trees were damaged.
EF2	WSW of Tennessee Ridge	Benton, Houston	TN	36.2542°N 88.0073°W	0207–0230	6.56 mi (10.56 km)	440 yd (400 m)	$10,250,000	Sixteen houses or mobile homes were destroyed and 31 houses or mobile homes sustained major damage. Trees were uprooted and snapped, and 20 power poles were downed.
EF1	Western Clifton	Wayne, Perry	TN	35.3792°N 88.0208°W	0210–0222	10.11 mi (16.27 km)	50 yd (46 m)	Unknown	Several houses were damaged at the west edge of Clifton and trees were downed along the path.
EF1	W of Hohenwald to E of Centerville	Perry, Lewis, Hickman	TN	35.5667°N 87.6833°W	0210–0235	22.85 mi (36.77 km)	200 yd (180 m)	$900,000	Four houses and two mobile homes were destroyed. Six houses sustained major damage. Barns and outbuildings were flattened, and trees were snapped and uprooted.
EF1	Western Bloomfield	Greene	IN	39.0204°N 86.9488°W	0215–0219	2 mi (3.2 km)	50 yd (46 m)	$1,250,000	Several dozen homes, garages, and outbuildings, as well as an elementary school, sustained significant roof and wall damage. Numerous trees were snapped or uprooted and power lines were downed.
EF2	E of Broseley to N of Bernie	Butler, Stoddard	MO	36.6859°N 90.22°W	0218–0238	13.9 mi (22.4 km)	200 yd (180 m)	$300,000	Near Broseley, this high-end EF2 tornado ripped large sections of roof from several homes, and obliterated an abandoned mobile home leaving the frame bent. Metal silos were thrown up to 900 yards away from where they originated. One of these silos was smashed into a house, which lost its roof and most of its exterior walls. Near Bernie, a metal barn was destroyed with debris scattered hundreds of yards away, a concrete silo was destroyed, and a wagon was thrown 150 yards. Extensive damage to trees and power poles occurred along the path.
EF2	SW of Primm Springs to W of Brentwood	Hickman, Williamson	TN	35.8042°N 87.2875°W	0240–0315	25.32 mi (40.75 km)	300 yd (270 m)	$750,000	Severe damage occurred in the rural community of Brushy with 8 houses destroyed and 39 others heavily damaged. Additional homes were damaged near Leiper's Fork, one of which collapsed. One person was injured. The tornado dissipated just before reaching the Nashville suburbs.
EF3	SW of Castalian Springs, TN to Lafayette, TN to NE of Tompkinsville, KY	Sumner (TN), Trousdale (TN), Macon (TN), Monroe (KY), Cumberland (KY)	TN, KY	36.3822°N 86.3358°W	0402–0451	50.32 mi (80.98 km)	880 yd (800 m)	$28,802,000	22 deaths – See section on this tornado – A total of 63 people were injured.
EF0	WSW of Jonesville	Catahoula	LA	31.5629°N 91.9836°W	0517–0518	1.47 mi (2.37 km)	50 yd (46 m)	$2,000	Tin was ripped off a barn and numerous limbs were downed.
EF2	W of Cecilia to Elizabethtown	Hardin	KY	37.6625°N 86.0125°W	0521–0525	7.1 mi (11.4 km)	400 yd (370 m)	$3,000,000	This tornado was embedded within a squall line. It destroyed a mobile home and an outbuilding at the beginning of the path before striking Cecilia and Elizabethtown. Central Hardin High School in Elizabethtown sustained major roof damage. Concrete pillar stadium lights at the school football stadium were snapped, and the press box was thrown onto the field and destroyed. Homes along the path sustained severe roof damage, and one home lost its roof entirely. An industrial building had roof damage and its garage doors blown in. Several boats were flipped over, and a large bus was pushed two feet as well.
EF2	E of Elizabethtown	Hardin	KY	37.6965°N 85.7759°W	0527–0529	1.02 mi (1.64 km)	300 yd (270 m)	$150,000	One mobile home was destroyed while another was knocked off its foundation and a third was turned onto its roof.
EF1	N of Bonnieville	Hart	KY	37.4031°N 85.9556°W	0532–0543	10.53 mi (16.95 km)	150 yd (140 m)	$500,000	Several barns and mobile homes were damaged or destroyed. A house was damaged.
EF0	NNW of Fairfield	Spencer	KY	37.9917°N 85.4187°W	0538–0540	0.66 mi (1.06 km)	220 yd (200 m)	$150,000	Two mobile homes were destroyed. Roofs and trees were damaged.
EF2	N of New Haven	Nelson	KY	37.7265°N 85.6326°W	0538–0542	1.29 mi (2.08 km)	300 yd (270 m)	$150,000	An outbuilding was destroyed, the top half of a silo was knocked off, and trees were downed.
EF0	WNW of Lobelville	Perry	TN	35.81°N 87.822°W	0541	0.1 mi (0.16 km)	20 yd (18 m)	$0	Trees were damaged.
EF0	S of Taylorsville	Spencer	KY	38.0179°N 85.34°W	0543–0545	0.56 mi (0.90 km)	220 yd (200 m)	$300,000	Two barns were destroyed while several other barns and homes were damaged. One person was injured.
EF2	NNE of Shelbyville	Shelby	KY	38.268°N 85.2028°W	0546–0552	6.99 mi (11.25 km)	250 yd (230 m)	$175,000	A large, well-built barn was destroyed and tossed 50 yd (46 m). An 18,000 lb (8,200 kg) trailer was moved and flipped. Another barn was destroyed, shingles were removed from a well-constructed roof top, several homes sustained some sort of roof damage, and trees were damaged.
EF2	E of Bardstown	Nelson	KY	37.8113°N 85.3812°W	0550–0552	0.76 mi (1.22 km)	300 yd (270 m)	$250,000	Two shop buildings were heavily damaged or destroyed. A couple trailers were rolled over, and a mobile home was knocked off its foundation and rolled onto two cars. Two people were injured.
EF0	E of Only	Hickman	TN	35.8708°N 87.6639°W	0551	0.1 mi (0.16 km)	20 yd (18 m)	$0	Trees were damaged.
EF0	SE of Waddy	Shelby	KY	38.1218°N 85.0512°W	0552–0554	0.35 mi (0.56 km)	125 yd (114 m)	$60,000	A barn was destroyed, with its sheet metal thrown long distances in several directions.
EF1	Brandenburg	Meade	KY	37.9615°N 86.2713°W	0554–0605	6.45 mi (10.38 km)	350 yd (320 m)	$2,000,000	This tornado caused considerable damage in Brandenburg, which was devastated by a violent F5 tornado during the 1974 Super Outbreak. Several businesses were damaged, a cinder block storage building collapsed, and another storage building lifted up and thrown. One building sustained collapse of an exterior wall, the Old Brandenburg Telephone Company had roof damage, a church was damaged, and extensive tree and power line damage occurred as well.

=== February 6 event ===
List of confirmed tornadoes – Wednesday, February 6, 2008
EF#	Location	County / Parish	State	Start Coord.	Time (UTC)	Path length	Max width	Damage	Summary
EF1	E of Springfield	Washington	KY	37.6663°N 85.1817°W	0601–0603	0.3 mi (0.48 km)	150 yd (140 m)	$60,000	The roof was blown off a house and tossed 125 yd (114 m). Several trees were snapped, and small outbuildings were destroyed.
EF2	S of Mackville	Washington	KY	37.6889°N 85.0649°W	0606–0608	0.99 mi (1.59 km)	250 yd (230 m)	$15,000	A large, well-constructed outbuilding was blown away. Six-by-six inch posts were snapped, metal sheeting was thrown long distances, and 200 lb (91 kg) concrete joists were displaced.
EF1	NE of Frankfort	Franklin	KY	38.2428°N 84.8121°W	0608–0612	2.44 mi (3.93 km)	170 yd (160 m)	$500,000	Numerous hardwood trees were downed. Two homes sustained extensive roof damage, and five barns were destroyed.
EF1	Eastern Harrodsburg	Mercer	KY	37.7603°N 84.8393°W	0620–0622	0.88 mi (1.42 km)	350 yd (320 m)	$1,000,000	A warehouse had three of its walls collapsed, a garage was destroyed, the roof of a factory was blown in, and an elementary school sustained extensive roof and ceiling damage. Trees were snapped or uprooted; fallen trees and flying limbs damaged homes and vehicles. A chimney and power lines were downed.
EF2	SW of Cynthiana	Harrison	KY	38.3633°N 84.3778°W	0629–0634	3.49 mi (5.62 km)	440 yd (400 m)	$700,000	Several homes sustained damage, including a few that had their entire roofs ripped off. Several barns and outbuildings were damaged or destroyed, and numerous hardwood trees were snapped.
EF0	S of Burns	Dickson	TN	36.0125°N 87.3167°W	0632	0.1 mi (0.16 km)	20 yd (18 m)	$0	Minor tree damage occurred.
EF0	WNW of Nashville	Davidson	TN	36.2083°N 86.9514°W	0644	0.1 mi (0.16 km)	20 yd (18 m)	$0	Trees were downed.
EF0	SE of Benton	Yazoo	MS	32.7093°N 90.2314°W	0646–0652	4.77 mi (7.68 km)	75 yd (69 m)	$180,000	Two grain bins were destroyed, a tractor trailer was blown on its side, metal roofing was peeled off a home, and power poles were downed.
EF0	NNE of Winchester	Clark	KY	38.0732°N 84.1446°W	0651–0652	0.92 mi (1.48 km)	125 yd (114 m)	$200,000	Two barns were destroyed and three more were severely damaged. A house was damaged, a corn crib was destroyed, and many trees were snapped or uprooted.
EF1	S of Owingsville	Bath	KY	38.0989°N 83.8332°W	0706–0715	8.73 mi (14.05 km)	250 yd (230 m)	$250,000	Two mobile homes, several barns, and outbuildings were almost completely destroyed.
EF0	E of Millersville	Sumner	TN	36.3528°N 86.6736°W	0712–0718	3.26 mi (5.25 km)	50 yd (46 m)	$0	Minor tree damage occurred.
EF1	NNW of Gallatin	Sumner	TN	36.4042°N 86.5417°W	0722–0745	11.76 mi (18.93 km)	100 yd (91 m)	$0	Some tree damage was observed.
EF0	NNE of Denniston	Menifee	KY	37.949°N 83.53°W	0723–0727	4.03 mi (6.49 km)	150 yd (140 m)	$50,000	Two older barns were destroyed, and several trees were snapped or uprooted.
EF1	N of Carthage	Leake	MS	32.8813°N 89.5544°W	0725–0727	1.5 mi (2.4 km)	50 yd (46 m)	$0	Several large pine trees were downed and other smaller trees were snapped.
EF3	Amos to SW of Fountain Run	Allen, Monroe	KY	36.6403°N 86.1132°W	0740–0753	9.44 mi (15.19 km)	440 yd (400 m)	$1,480,000	4 deaths – This high-end EF3 tornado caused major damage in the Amos community. 12 homes and mobile homes were completely destroyed in this area, including a few older frame homes that were swept from their foundations. Mobile home frames, pieces of farm machinery, and vehicles were thrown and mangled. Large swaths of trees were mowed down in wooded areas, destroying about 200,000 log feet of timber. Fences were flattened, and many farm animals were killed. Eleven people were injured.
EF0	W of Franklin	Williamson	TN	35.8875°N 87.0542°W	0745–0747	1.6 mi (2.6 km)	300 yd (270 m)	$0	Trees sustained minor damage.
EF0	SE of Macon	Noxubee	MS	33.02°N 88.49°W	0755–0757	1.67 mi (2.69 km)	50 yd (46 m)	$0	Trees were snapped and limbs were downed.
EF1	Beaverton	Lamar, Marion	AL	33.9265°N 88.0309°W	0804–0813	7.3 mi (11.7 km)	150 yd (140 m)	$70,000	In Beaverton, the town's post office had its metal roof blown off, and the city hall building sustained roof damage. Many trees were snapped in town, some of which landed on homes and caused major damage. Other trees landed on roads and railroad tracks. North of Guin, additional trees were downed, one of which landed on and destroyed a barn.
EF2	E of Newtonville to NW of Oakman	Fayette, Tuscaloosa, Walker	AL	33.5294°N 87.7729°W	0851–0919	26.19 mi (42.15 km)	2,000 yd (1,800 m)	$335,000	Near the beginning of the path, this very large wedge tornado caused major damage to mobile homes. A gas station in the New Lexington area was damaged. The most severe damage occurred near Oakman, where frame homes sustained major damage and mobile homes were destroyed. A total of eight structures were destroyed, and 15 others were damaged. Numerous trees were snapped and uprooted along the path, and four people were injured.
EF4	S of Moulton to SW of Decatur	Lawrence, Morgan	AL	34.397°N 87.289°W	0902–0924	16.7 mi (26.9 km)	880 yd (800 m)	Unknown	4 deaths – See section on this tornado – A total of 23 people were injured.
EF0	E of Dodge City	Cullman	AL	34.0445°N 86.867°W	1000–1001	0.33 mi (0.53 km)	20 yd (18 m)	$0	Trees were damaged and uprooted.
EF1	N of Guntersville	Marshall	AL	34.391°N 86.2761°W	1045–1046	0.16 mi (0.26 km)	35 yd (32 m)	Unknown	Eight trees were snapped or uprooted, an unanchored carport and two small storage sheds were destroyed, and a house sustained minor roof damage. Three windows were blown out, and a large telephone pole was destroyed.
EF4	S of Pisgah to S of Flat Rock	Jackson	AL	34.667°N 85.844°W	1117–1129	10.9 mi (17.5 km)	660 yd (600 m)	Unknown	1 death – This violent tornado produced its worst damage near Rosalie, where multiple frame homes were destroyed. Some of these homes were swept clean from their foundations. Numerous trees were snapped and denuded, chicken houses were destroyed, and 2,500-pound hay bales were thrown and shredded. Aerial surveys revealed some ground scouring in open fields as well. The fatality occurred when a woman was killed in the destruction of her frame home, and twelve others were injured.
EF2	NE of Clanton to S of Sylacauga	Coosa, Talladega	AL	32.9955°N 86.5022°W	1225–1245	15.9 mi (25.6 km)	2,000 yd (1,800 m)	$120,000	This massive wedge tornado was more than a mile wide at times. A wide swath of hardwood trees was mowed down, two mobile homes were blown off of their foundations and rolled over, and four large power poles were snapped. A carport was overturned as well.

== See also ==
- Weather of 2008
- List of North American tornadoes and tornado outbreaks
- List of F4 and EF4 tornadoes
  - List of F4 and EF4 tornadoes (2000–2009)
