= Nokuse Preserve =

Privately owned nature reserve in Florida

Coordinates: 30.4597°N 85.9587°W

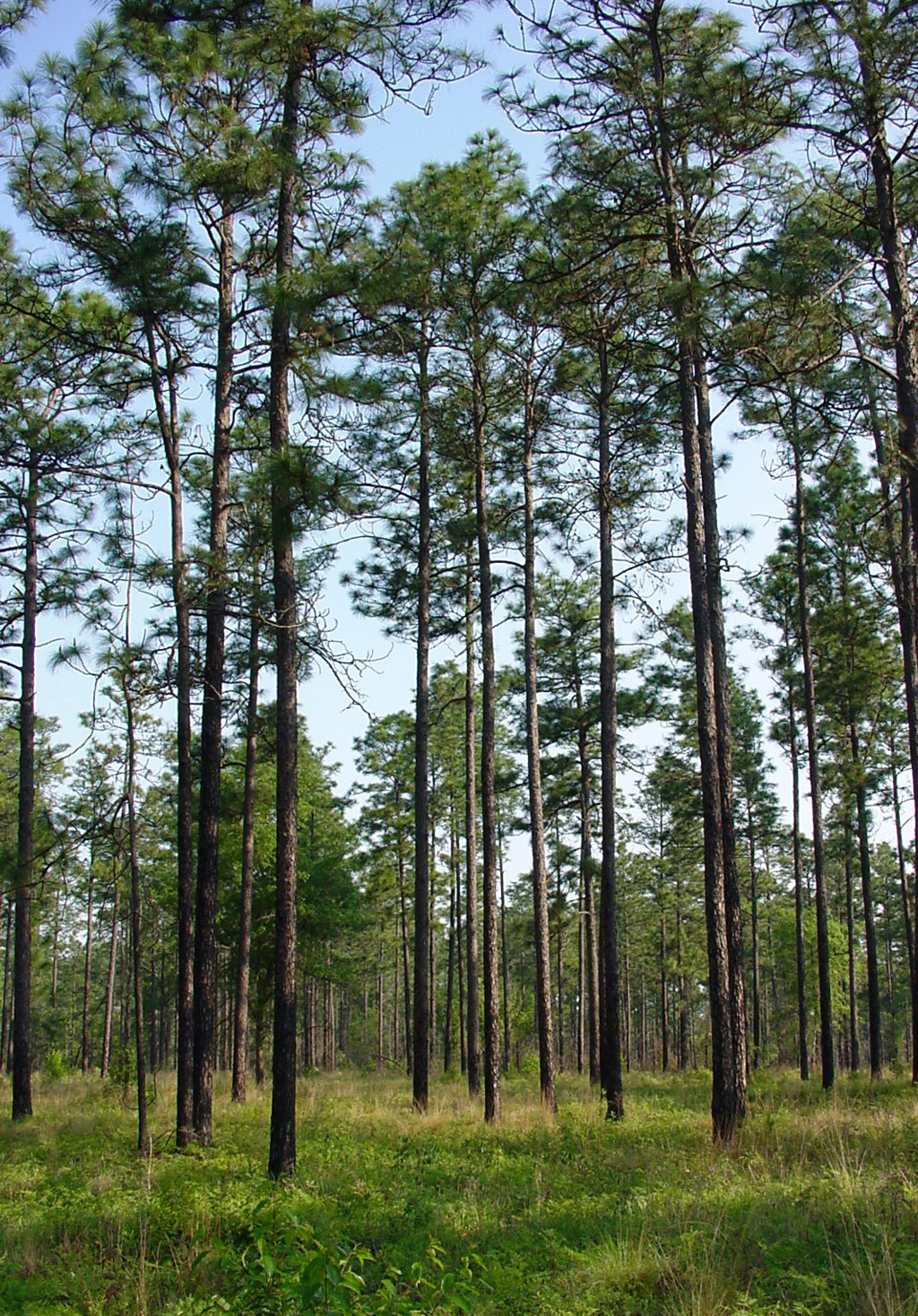
Longleaf pine forestry: such forests once covered much of the American southeast.

Nokuse Preserve (formerly, Plantation) is a privately owned nature preserve in northwest Florida's Walton County. It consists of approximately 56,000 acres (230 km^{2}) and is the largest privately owned nature preserve in the Southeastern United States. Founded in 2000, it is funded by timber and oil commodities trader Marion Clifton Davis and his wife, Stella Davis. Its name, Nokuse, is the Native American word for black bear in the Muscogee language, an umbrella species on the preserve. The reserve serves as a haven for the locally threatened gopher tortoise, an inhabitant of longleaf pine forests. Tortoises recovered from local urbanised areas have been released into the reserve.

Land in the "Northwest Florida Greenway area" was chosen because of the availability of large tracts and because the Florida Panhandle was one of six designated biologically hyperdiverse hotspots in the United States. The majority of property was purchased for $90 million from timber companies and was planted with eight million seedlings to restore it to the kind of pine woodland that had been deforested by the early twentieth century A wildlife underpass connects Nokuse with Eglin Air Force Base which contains a remnant of longleaf pine forest, with some 500-year-old trees.

Nokuse includes a 28,000-square-foot (2,600 m^{2}), $12 million nature discovery center named for the evolutionary biologist, E.O. Wilson.
