= Lake Whippoorill (Orange County, Florida) =

- Location within Florida Location within the United States
- Location: eastern edge of Ocoee, Florida, along West Colonial Drive
- Coordinates: 28.3890°N 81.2360°W
- Lake type: natural freshwater lake
- Basin countries: United States
- Max. length: 1.14 miles (1.83 km)
- Max. width: 0.65 miles (1.05 km)
- Surface area: 326 acres (132 ha)
- Average depth: 13 feet (4.0 m)
- Water volume: 1,391,581,111 US gallons (5.26770754×10^{9} L)
- Surface elevation: 69 feet (21 m)

Lake Whippoorill, also known as Barton Lake, is an oblong freshwater lake in the community of Lake Hart, which is in Orange County, Florida. Some development surrounds this lake and on the west side it is bordered by the Lake Whippoorill Kampground of America. Just to the north and west is the Central Florida GreeneWay, (Florida State Road 417). A canal, probably not even traversable by even a very small boat, connects Lake Whippoorill to Lake Hart, to the east.

Boating is allowed on this lake, but it has no public boat docks. It also has no public swimming areas.
