= Split Oak Forest Wildlife and Environmental Area =

Protected area in Orlando, Florida, United States

- Center trail of Split Oak Forest Wildlife and Environmental Area

- Location within Florida
- Interactive map of Split Oak Forest Wildlife and Environmental Area
- Location: Orange County, Florida; Osceola County, Florida
- Nearest city: Orlando, Florida
- Coordinates: 28.3516°N 81.2019°W
- Area: 1,689 acres (684 ha)
- Governing body: Florida Fish and Wildlife Conservation Commission

Split Oak Forest Wildlife and Environmental Area is an area of wilderness conservation lands southeast of Orlando, Florida. It straddles the border between Orange County and Osceola County and is managed by the Florida Fish and Wildlife Conservation Commission, which has been granted a conservation easement over the property by the two counties.

The Florida Fish and Wildlife Conservation Commission's management plan for Split Oak Forest is "to restore and maintain the habitats critical to the long-term benefit of state and federally listed upland species, particularly the gopher tortoise."

The wilderness area includes prairie and scrub habitat, including sandhill terrain, and is home to gopher tortoises, sandhill cranes, eastern indigo snakes, fox squirrels, butterflies, woodpeckers, kestrels, various songbirds, and some rare plant species.

There are trails throughout the wilderness area for visitors. The wilderness area trails are accessible via both Moss Park and Clapp Simms Duda Road. The wilderness area is adjacent to Eagles Roost Park, home of the Back to Nature wildlife refuge.

== Toll Road Proposal ==
A parkway extension project across the southern portion of the forest is proposed to provide vehicular access to an area of new development. Groups such as the Friends of Split Oak Forest and Save Split Oak have formed to advocate protecting the area from the intrusion of the road. A conservation land swap is proposed to mitigate impact from the road and this plan has received support from county commissioners and Charles Lee of the Florida Audubon Society. The Orlando Sentinel editorial board supports the road project with planned mitigation.

A proposed Osceola Parkway extension is planned through the southern part of the preserve. The road project is one of many including new toll roads being proposed through largely undeveloped areas during Governor Ron DeSantis' tenure.

In 2020, Orange County voters approved a charter amendment restricting Split Oak Forest to conservation purposes and limiting the county commission's authority to alter those protections. The measure was prompted by the plans to route the Osceola Parkway Extension through part of the preserve, despite earlier conservation commitments. Osceola County challenged the amendment in court, contending that it misled voters and improperly obstructed a transportation project, while advocates argued it reflected public opposition to development within the forest and sought to ensure its long-term preservation.

== See also ==
- Crosby Island Marsh Preserve
- Florida Trail
