= Florida Trail Association =

American non-profit organization

The Florida Trail Association is a private non-profit organization founded in 1966 that oversees the volunteer effort to build, maintain, protect and promote the Florida National Scenic Trail, one of eleven National Scenic Trails in the United States. Based in Gainesville, the Florida Trail Association's mission also includes:

- Building and maintaining hiking trails on other public lands.
- Providing educational opportunities for people to learn to appreciate and conserve the natural beauty of Florida.
- Providing recreational opportunities for hiking and camping.

With nineteen local chapters dispersed geographically throughout Florida, the Florida Trail Association draws on local support to build and maintain hiking trails, to provide guided outdoor recreation opportunities for the public, and to work with landowners to acquire protected natural lands to ensure a quality hiking experience for hikers on the Florida Trail corridor.

The Florida Trail Association works directly in concert with the federal land manager of the Florida Trail, the USDA Forest Service, to facilitate the acquisition of land, to direct volunteer efforts, and to provide public outreach.

The Florida Trail Association's main building was badly damaged by Hurricane Gloria in 1985.
