= Lake Hart, Florida =

Unincorporated area in Florida, US

- Census-designated place
- Location in Orange County and the state of Florida
- Coordinates: 28°22′42″N 81°13′38″W
- Country: United States
- State: Florida
- County: Orange

Area
  - Total: 1.68 sq mi (4.36 km^{2})
  - Land: 1.11 sq mi (2.88 km^{2})
  - Water: 0.57 sq mi (1.48 km^{2})
- Elevation: 69 ft (21 m)

Population (2020)
  - Total: 1,052
  - Density: 946.2/sq mi (365.32/km^{2})
- Time zone: UTC-5 (Eastern (EST))
  - Summer (DST): UTC-4 (EDT)
- ZIP code: 32832
- Area code: 321
- FIPS code: 12-38012
- GNIS feature ID: 2403192

Lake Hart is a census-designated place and an unincorporated area in Orange County, Florida, United States. As of the 2020 census, Lake Hart had a population of 1,052. It is part of the Orlando–Kissimmee Metropolitan Statistical Area.

== Geography ==
According to the United States Census Bureau, the CDP has a total area of 4.8 km^{2} (1.9 sq mi), of which 3.5 km^{2} (1.4 sq mi) is land and 1.2 km^{2} (0.46 sq mi) (25.95%) is water.

The CDP does not include the lake of the same name, but abuts it. It does include a smaller lake to the west of Lake Hart, named Lake Whippoorwill.

== Demographics ==
Historical population
Census	Pop.	Note	%±
2020	1,052		—
U.S. Decennial Census

=== 2020 census ===
As of the 2020 census, Lake Hart had a population of 1,052. The median age was 35.3 years. 19.0% of residents were under the age of 18 and 8.8% of residents were 65 years of age or older. For every 100 females there were 113.8 males, and for every 100 females age 18 and over there were 112.5 males age 18 and over.

100.0% of residents lived in urban areas, while 0.0% lived in rural areas.

There were 426 households in Lake Hart, of which 30.8% had children under the age of 18 living in them. Of all households, 54.2% were married-couple households, 14.1% were households with a male householder and no spouse or partner present, and 21.8% were households with a female householder and no spouse or partner present. About 19.4% of all households were made up of individuals and 5.4% had someone living alone who was 65 years of age or older.

There were 469 housing units, of which 9.2% were vacant. The homeowner vacancy rate was 0.6% and the rental vacancy rate was 10.3%.

Racial composition as of the 2020 census
Race	Number	Percent
White	576	54.8%
Black or African American	71	6.7%
American Indian and Alaska Native	1	0.1%
Asian	109	10.4%
Native Hawaiian and Other Pacific Islander	5	0.5%
Some other race	65	6.2%
Two or more races	225	21.4%
Hispanic or Latino (of any race)	308	29.3%

=== 2000 census ===
As of the 2000 census, there were 557 people, 227 households, and 155 families residing in the CDP. The population density was 157.0 people/km^{2} (407 people/mi^{2}). There were 258 housing units at an average density of 72.7 units/km^{2} (188 units/mi^{2}). The racial makeup of the CDP was 94.79% White, 0.54% African American, 0.18% Native American, 1.44% Asian, 1.44% from other races, and 1.62% from two or more races. Hispanic or Latino of any race were 3.95% of the population.

There were 227 households, out of which 23.8% had children under the age of 18 living with them, 59.5% were married couples living together, 5.7% had a female householder with no husband present, and 31.3% were non-families. 21.6% of all households were made up of individuals, and 6.6% had someone living alone who was 65 years of age or older. The average household size was 2.45 and the average family size was 2.78.

In the CDP, the population was spread out, with 20.3% under the age of 18, 4.3% from 18 to 24, 31.4% from 25 to 44, 31.2% from 45 to 64, and 12.7% who were 65 years of age or older. The median age was 42 years. For every 100 females, there were 111.8 males. For every 100 females age 18 and over, there were 112.4 males.

The median income for a household in the CDP was $50,625, and the median income for a family was $55,568. Males had a median income of $36,000 versus $22,361 for females. The per capita income for the CDP was $44,665. None of the families and 6.9% of the population were living below the poverty line, including no under eighteens and none of those over 64.
