= Zipline Safari =

Zip-line course in Florida, US

Coordinates: 29.2703°N 82.1797°W

Zipline Safari is a zip-line course in Florida. It is the only zip-line course in the state, and is claimed to be the world's only zip-line created for flat land. Zipline Safari opened on 16 January 2009 in Forever Florida, a wildlife attraction near Holopaw, Florida. The zip-line cost $350,000 to build, and consists of nine platforms built up from the ground and traveled between by zip-lining. Forever Florida built the course to promote ecotourism and interaction with the natural environment of Florida.
