= List of F4 and EF4 tornadoes (2000–2009) =

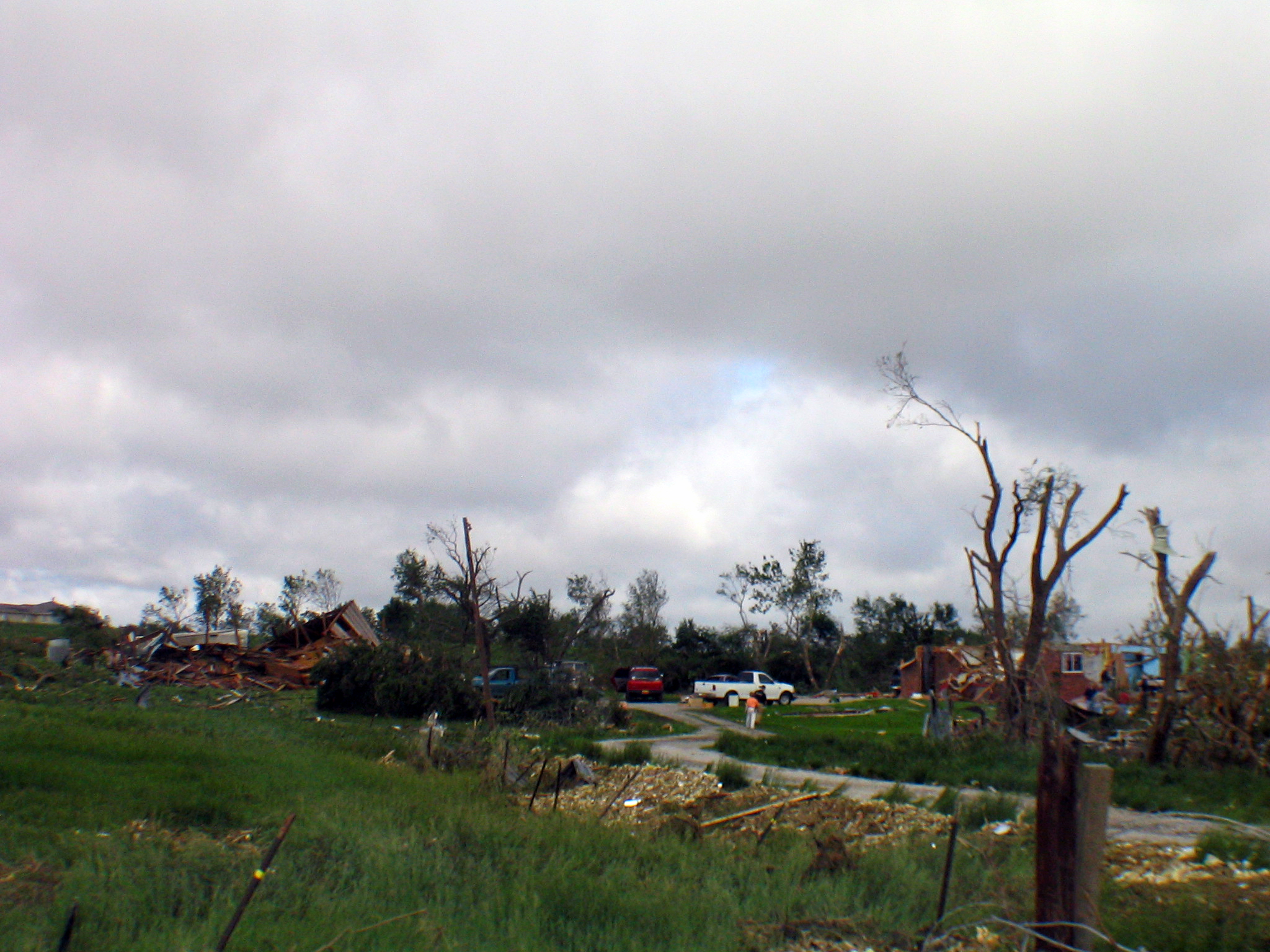
Building destroyed north of the Norris School district caused by an enormous F4 tornado in Hallam, Nebraska in 2004.

This is a list of tornadoes which have been officially labeled as F4, EF4, IF4, or an equivalent rating during the 2000s decade. These scales – the Fujita scale, the Enhanced Fujita scale, the International Fujita scale, and the TORRO tornado intensity scale – attempt to estimate the intensity of a tornado by classifying the damage caused to natural features and man-made structures in the tornado's path.

Tornadoes are among the most violent known meteorological phenomena. Each year, more than 2,000 tornadoes are recorded worldwide, with the vast majority occurring in North America and Europe. To assess the intensity of these events, meteorologist Ted Fujita devised a method to estimate maximum wind speeds within tornadic storms based on the damage caused; this became known as the Fujita scale. The scale ranks tornadoes from F0 to F5, with F0 being the least intense and F5 being the most intense. F4 tornadoes were estimated to have had maximum winds between 207 mph (333 km/h) and 260 mph (420 km/h) and are considered violent tornadoes, along with F5 tornadoes. (Note: The winds estimated by the Fujita Scale are estimated values and have not been verified scientifically.)

Following two particularly devastating tornadoes in 1997 and 1999, engineers questioned the reliability of the Fujita scale. Ultimately, a new scale was devised that took into account 28 different damage indicators; this became known as the Enhanced Fujita scale. With building design and structural integrity taken more into account, winds in an EF4 tornado were estimated to between 166 mph (267 km/h) and 200 mph (320 km/h). The Enhanced Fujita scale is used predominantly in North America. Most of Europe, on the other hand, uses the TORRO tornado intensity scale (or T-Scale), which ranks tornado intensity between T0 and T11; F4/EF4 tornadoes are approximately equivalent to T8 to T9 on the T-Scale. Tornadoes rated IF4 on the International Fujita scale are also included on this list. Violent tornadoes, those rated F4/EF4 and F5/EF5 are rare and only make up 2% of all recorded tornadoes.

== List ==
Tornadoes officially rated F4/EF4 or equivalent
Day	Year	Country	Subdivision	Location	Fatalities	Notes	Rated by
July 25	2000	United States	Minnesota	Granite Falls	1 (15 injuries)	Most of the damage caused by this tornado was caused by F2-F3 winds in a primarily residential area of Granite Falls. However, a single F4 damage indicator was given based on the twisted wreckage of an overturned railroad car. The tornado caused $20 million (2000 USD) in damage.	NWS
September 20	2000	United States	Ohio	Xenia	1 (100 injuries)	2000 Xenia tornado – A violent tornado that moved at 65 mph hit the town of Xenia for the second time in 26 years damaging some of the same areas that were hit in 1974. Along the path, over 300 structures were damaged or destroyed. A strip mall was nearly destroyed, cars were thrown from the Highway 35 bypass into ditches, 4 semi-trailers were thrown up to 400 yards, and most of the buildings were damaged or destroyed at the Greene county fairgrounds. The tornado caused $15 million (2000 USD) in damage.	NWS
December 16	2000	United States	Alabama	Tuscaloosa	11 (144 injuries)	Tornado outbreak of December 16, 2000 — Near the beginning of the tornado's 18-mile path, the tornado completely destroyed a shopping center and destroyed numerous residential structures. Further down the path, numerous mobile homes were destroyed and trees were snapped.	NWS
April 21	2001	United States	Kansas	Hoisington	1 (28 injuries)	2001 Hoisington tornado – After touching down, this tornado rapidly strengthened to F3 intensity. Minutes later, it strengthened to F4 intensity as it caused a 2-mile long path of destruction. The tornado destroyed 194 structures, caused major damage to 52 structures, and tore the roof off a hospital in this area.	NWS
June 13	2001	United States	Nebraska	Ruby, Seward	0 (2 injuries)	A slow-moving tornado that was filmed by numerous storm chasers. At F4 intensity, the tornado destroyed an entire farmstead and a propane and anhydrous ammonia tank farm and machine shed. Several vehicles were tumbled and tossed into a field across from the farmhouse.	NWS
September 24	2001	United States	Virginia	Rixeyville, Jeffersonton	0 (2 injuries)	Tornado outbreak of September 24, 2001 — The tornado leveled a solidly constructed 3-level brick home, carrying large debris up to a half-mile away.	NWS
November 23	2001	United States	Mississippi	Winterville, Mount Bayou	0 (48 injuries)	Tornado outbreak of November 23–24, 2001 — The worst part of the damage was in the Winterville area, where 16 homes, seven mobile homes, six businesses and a power substation were destroyed. A few of the destroyed homes were swept away. Numerous other structures including homes and mobile homes sustained minor to severe damage.	NWS
November 24	2001	United States	Mississippi	Madison, Canton	2 (21 injuries)	Tornado outbreak of November 23–24, 2001 — 84 homes and 10 mobile homes were severely damaged or destroyed with minor damage to 67 other homes and three mobile homes. The worst part of the damage occurred in the Fairfield subdivision of the Madison area, where several homes were leveled or swept away.	NWS
November 24	2001	United States	Alabama	Highland Lake, Oneonta, Altoona	0 (22 injuries)	Tornado outbreak of November 23–24, 2001 — Numerous homes were destroyed, some of which were completely leveled. Several heavy vehicles or equipment such as bulldozers, dump trunks, and storage containers were rolled over or moved a certain distance. Several other homes, one church, one pole-barn building, and trailers were damaged or destroyed.	NWS
April 24	2002	United States	Missouri	Van Buren, Ellsinore, Missouri, Mark Twain National Forest, Poplar Bluff	0 (16 injuries)	Damage on the south side of Ellsinore was severe, where about 7 businesses were destroyed by F-4 intensity winds. Further down the path, an upscale residential subdivision beyond the northern outskirts of Poplar Bluff received extensive damage. At least two well-constructed homes were leveled by peak winds estimated around 210 MPH. Around a hundred other homes in this area sustained damage and half were destroyed. Highway 67's asphalt was scoured. This tornado caused $45 million (2002 USD) in damage.	NWS
April 28	2002	United States	Maryland	La Plata	3 (122 injuries)	2002 La Plata tornado — A long-tracked violent tornado touched down in Marbury in southern Maryland. It continued on an ESE track eventually striking La Plata at F4 strength. Two homes next to a lumberyard sustained F4 damage. Most of the city sustained F3 damage aside from the two F4 rated homes. The tornado continued on a mainly eastward path eventually crossing the Patuxent River. It made shore on a stretch of land hitting a mobile home park. It crossed into the Chesapeake Bay eventually making landfall again near the Taylors Island Wildlife Management Area. The tornado continued ESE for a little while and then lifted west of Salisbury leaving 3 dead and 122 injured. Peak wind speeds were estimated to be in between 207 and 260 mph. This tornado was originally rated F5 by NWS surveyors but was later downgraded to an F4 after further surveys done by engineer and meteorologist Timothy P. Marshall.	NWS
June 23	2002	United States	South Dakota	Barnard	0 (0 injuries)	Tornado outbreak of June 23, 2002 — A violent tornado touched down southeast of Barnard in northeastern South Dakota. It continued on a NE track passing west of the Sand Lake National Wildlife Refuge. The tornado suddenly made a northern turn crossing State Highway 10 where it reached F4 strength completely sweeping away a farmstead. It continued north for a little longer before making a loop due to an occlusion of the mesocyclone. Peak wind speeds were estimated to be in between 207 and 260 mph.	NWS
August 11	2002	United States	North Dakota	Medina	0 (0 injuries)	A violent tornado touched down north of Medina in central North Dakota. It continued on a northern track eventually destroying a farmstead at F4 strength. A 9-ton grain truck was moved 250 feet and destroyed. 5 transmission towers were toppled. It eventually lifted southeast of the Chase Lake National Wildlife Refuge. Peak wind speeds were estimated to be in between 207 and 260 mph.	NWS
November 10	2002	United States	Ohio	Van Wert, Roselms	4 (17 injuries)	2002 Van Wert–Roselms tornado — A violent wedge tornado touched down southeast of Wren in western Ohio. It continued on a NE track where it then intensified to F4 strength along Zook Rd where one person was killed. The tornado continued northeast at F4 strength striking Van Wert where it hit the Twin Cinemas and the Vision Industrial Park. The cinema was mostly full of children but they took shelter before it hit. Vehicles from the parking lot were thrown into the seats where the children had been sitting. An 18-year-old male driving past the cinemas was thrown from his vehicle and killed. The tornado then destroyed five industries in the Vision Industrial Park, before moving north of U.S. Route 30, producing F4 damage to additional businesses and homes. The tornado weakened to F3 as it moved northeast and crossed into Paulding County, Ohio. 164 homes were damaged in Van Wert County, Ohio and 43 were totally destroyed. 27 businesses sustained damage, with 5 totally destroyed in Vision Park. Three county engineer buildings were destroyed, with one house used by a township. Total damage in Van Wert County, Ohio was near 30 million dollars. It continued much further northeast eventually lifted southwest of McClure leaving 4 dead and 17 injured. Peak wind speeds were estimated to be in between 207 and 260 mph.	NWS
May 4	2003	United States	Kansas, Missouri	Edwardsville, Kansas City, Riverside, Pleasant Valley	2 (30 injuries)	Tornado outbreak sequence of May 2003 — A violent stovepipe tornado touched down near the Kansas Speedway in northeastern Kansas. This tornado initially produced F0 to F1 damage but produced F3 damage to 2 homes, just south of Parallel Pkwy near Interstate 435. The tornado grew to a width of nearly 500 yards in Kansas City, where some marginal F4 damage was noted around N 91st St and Leavenworth Rd. The tornado continued some F2 to F3 damage near 84th Terrace north of Leavenworth Rd. This is the location where an 82-year-old man was killed in his residence. The tornado continued northeast through Wyandotte County, Kansas where another instance of marginal F4 damage was noted near 79th St and Cernech Rd. Considerable structural damage was noted in this location, along with four 150-foot-tall metal power poles engineered to withstand maximum winds over 200 mph. The tornado produced F1 to F2 damage up to the Missouri River before crossing into Platte County, Missouri. There were 14 buildings destroyed, 42 with major damage within Platte County, Missouri. The tornado dissipated in Riverside just south of Interstate 29 leaving 2 dead and 30 injured. Peak wind speeds were estimated to be in between 207 and 260 mph.	NWS
May 4	2003	United States	Kansas, Missouri	Franklin, Liberal	4 (30 injuries)	Tornado outbreak sequence of May 2003 — A violent wedge tornado touched down southeast of Saint Paul in southeastern Kansas. The tornado continued on an ENE track passing south of Girard until it struck Franklin at high-end F4 strength. The tornado is speculated by many people to be of F5 strength while it was in Franklin. It continued further ENE just barely missing the city of Mulberry and then crossing into Barton County, Missouri, Missouri. The tornado destroyed several farmhouses and outbuildings prior to dissipating one mile north of Liberal leaving 4 dead and 30 injured. Peak wind speeds were estimated to be in between 250 and 260 mph.	NWS
May 4	2003	United States	Missouri	Gladstone	0 (13 injuries)	Tornado outbreak sequence of May 2003 — A violent tornado touched down in Gladstone in northwestern Missouri. It touched down producing F0 to F1 damage to trees and roofs. The tornado intensified rather quickly, producing marginal F4 damage near the intersection of NE 63rd Terrace and N Jackson Dr. Another small area of marginal F4 damage was noted just northeast of this location, in the Carriage Hills subdivision, just south of Pleasant Valley Rd near N Brighton Ave. Areas of F1 to F3 intensity damage were noted around these specific neighborhoods. The tornado continued northeast lifting just shy of Interstate 435 before dissipating leaving 13 injured. Peak wind speeds were estimated to be in between 207 and 260 mph.	NWS
May 4	2003	United States	Tennessee	Leighton, Denmark, McKellar-Sipes Regional Airport, Oak Grove, Westover, Jackson, Lexington	11 (36 injuries)	Tornado outbreak sequence of May 2003 — A violent tornado touched down NW of Denmark in western Tennessee where it soon destroyed the Denmark Elementary School. It continued on an ENE track striking the McKellar–Sipes Regional Airport and then hitting downtown Jackson at F4 strength. St. Luke Episcopal Church, one of the oldest churches in Tennessee built in 1844, was destroyed. The Carl Perkins Civic Center, the Tennessee Supreme Court Building, the downtown Jackson Post Office, and the National Guard Armory were damaged. The Procter & Gamble factory where Pringles Potato Chips are made and a Coca-Cola bottling plant was also damaged. Jackson Middle School was destroyed and 24 other schools in the county were damaged. The tornado caused severe damage to the local power and water utilities across the county. The tornado moved into Henderson County, Tennessee where it hit the city of Lexington. 36 homes were destroyed and nearly 1,000 homes were damaged. Seven commercial buildings were destroyed and another 73 were damaged. The tornado dissipated in Lexington leaving 11 dead and 36 injured. Peak wind speeds were estimated to be between 207 and 260 mph.	NWS
May 6	2003	United States	Illinois	New Grand Chain, Hillerman, Golconda	2 (33 injuries)	Tornado outbreak sequence of May 2003 — A violent tornado touched down just west of New Grand Chain in southern Illinois. In Pulaski County, Illinois alone, 6 single family homes and 10 mobile homes were destroyed. Another 10 single-family homes and a mobile home had major damage. A few dozen other residences received some type of minor damage. A few dozen outbuildings, two businesses, and a campground were destroyed or had major damage. The tornado reached low-end F4 strength in the community of Hillerman along Tick Ridge Rd. Mobile homes were disintegrated and several modern framed homes were leveled. One frame house was swept clean off its foundation, with only the roof left intact in a creek about 200 yards away. Many vehicles were lifted, rolled, or thrown up to 100 yards or more. A deputy sheriff escaped unhurt after his patrol car was thrown about 50 yards and struck by a flying tree and telephone pole. Numerous cases of "missiling" was observed, including glass embedded in trees. Tree debarking was noted in forested areas. Most of the leveled frame homes were on Boaz Rd and Rolling Hills Rd in Hillerman. After passing through Hillerman, the tornado overturned dozens of railroad cars of a train just west of the Mermet Lake State Fish and Wildlife Area. The Mermet Lake State Fish and Wildlife Area was extensively damaged. An estimated 300 acres of forest were destroyed, boat docks were destroyed, and bathing facilities were destroyed. After destroying additional residences and high-tension power lines, the tornado crossed Interstate 24, tractor-trailer rigs and a tour bus were overturned on the interstate, injuring the drivers. The interstate was closed due to grain bins, tree limbs, and some building debris on the highway. Additional residences were destroyed between the interstate and the Pope County, Illinois line. In Massac County, Illinois, a total of 15 single-family houses and 13 mobile homes were destroyed. About 20 other single-family houses and 15 mobile homes received major damage. Several dozen other residences had some type of minor damage. The tornado dissipated just northeast of Golcanda leaving 2 dead and 33 injured. Peak wind speeds were estimated to be 210 mph.	NWS
May 8	2003	United States	Oklahoma	Moore, Tinker Air Force Base	0 (134 injuries)	Tornado outbreak sequence of May 2003 —	NWS
June 23	2003	United States	Nebraska	Coleridge	1 (0 injuries)	2003 South Dakota tornado outbreak — A violent tornado touched down WNW of Coleridge in northeastern Nebraska. The tornado moved southeast and then moved northeast based on aerial surveys of heavy ground scouring. It made a loop along 875 Rd and continued southeast once again. It then mde another turn northeast and crossed the northern sections of the city uprooting trees, downing power lines and destroying a couple of grain bins. A construction business in a garage was also destroyed. The tornado then continued east of town hitting a large hog farm. At this farm a 70-year-old man was killed while in a storage shed when a tractor that was flipped by the winds crushed him. Many livestock were also killed by debris or flung through the air by the deadly winds. In one case cattle were carried over a mile then left dead in a pile. The tornado then widened to around 3/4 of a mile, reaching its maximum intensity. It did another loop just north of 876 Rd and started to take an ESE track. Numerous vehicles were tossed at this location and a complete farmstead was flattened. Trees were also stripped and debarked. The tornado hit 2 more farmsteads and moved one house off of its foundation. In total, 11 homes received substantial damage and between 100 and 200 utility poles were downed.The tornado remained around 3/4 of a mile wide for a few more miles before suddenly turning SSE and lifting leaving 1 dead. Peak wind speeds were estimated to be in between 207 and 260 mph.	NWS
June 24	2003	United States	South Dakota	Manchester	0 (4 injuries)	2003 Manchester tornado — A violent wedge tornado touched down Manchester in eastern South Dakota. As it continued north the tornado damaged crops, trees, and power lines south of Manchester. It continued further north eventually crossing U.S. Route 14 where it destroyed or heavily damaged all buildings, other structures, and vehicles in the small town of Manchester. Propane and fuel oil tanks were destroyed. Many homes were stripped to the foundation. Of the six residents of the town, four were injured and were transported to hospitals. Three were deemed to be seriously injured, but none of the injuries were life-threatening. One of the injured was in a basement, One was blown out of the home on the way to the same basement, and two were in a mobile home which was destroyed. The tornado also heavily damaged several farms north of Manchester, including two farms on which several buildings including the homes were destroyed. One of the farms was a "Centennial Farm". About 12 cattle were killed and others injured. The amount of crop damage was not known. The tornado transitioned to a multiple-vortex tornado with vortices noted by chasers. The tornado was observed and video taped by numerous storm chasers and researchers including storm chaser and meteorologist Reed Timmer and engineer and storm chaser Tim Samaras. Researchers also deployed weather sensors around the town of Manchester. One of these sensors recorded a 100 millibar pressure drop as the tornado passed, making it the largest pressure drop recorded in a tornado at the time. The tornado dissipated a few miles north of Manchester leaving four injured. Peak wind speeds were estimated to be in between 207 and 260 mph.	NWS
May 12	2004	United States	Kansas	Harper	0 (1 injury)	An extremely violent wedge tornado touched down SE of Harper in southern Kansas. It completely swept away a well-built, two-story farmhouse and five other barns associated with the homestead. Cars and farm equipment were mangled beyond recognition or torn apart and thrown long distances. This tornado officially rated as an F4 for its slow movement.	NWS
May 22	2004	United States	Nebraska	Daykin, Wilber, Hallam, Palmyra	1 (38 injuries)	2004 Hallam tornado — An extremely wide violent wedge tornado touched down SW of Daykin in SE Nebraska. The tornado was of F1/F0 intensity during its track in Jefferson County, Nebraska, damaging farm outbuildings, grain bins, and trees. From there the tornado crossed into Saline County, Nebraska southwest of Western and remained an F1/F0 for most of its track in Saline County, Nebraska. It intensified to F2 strength when it struck the southern portion of Wilber. Homes southeast of Wilber had their roofs blown off at F2 strength. The tornado traveled from Wilber into Gage County, Nebraska, crossing the county line west of Clatonia where intensified to F4 strength. The tornado remained at F4 strength as it crossed into Lancaster County, Nebraska near Hallam. The tornado reached its peak width of 2.5 miles wide at this time as well. Many well-built homes were demolished from Clatonia to Hallam, along with grain bins, farm sheds, and outbuildings. Many trees were destroyed or uprooted. Although Hallam itself escaped the strongest winds from the storm, which occurred just south of town, 95 percent of the buildings in town were either destroyed or severely damaged. The lone fatality from the tornado occurred in Hallam. The storm also toppled several hopper cars from a freight train on the west edge of town. In total 55 railroad cars were derailed. From Hallam, the tornado traveled east for several miles before turning northeast again just north of Cortland. The storm then tracked 2 miles north of Firth, severely damaging the Firth-Norris high school and a nearby middle school. School buses were tossed in this area. Several homes northeast of the schools were flattened as the tornado once again intensified to F4 strength. The damage path continued northeast to Holland and then to 2 miles north of Panama where the tornado weakened to about F2 strength. The damage path began to narrow here as well. The track then curved more toward the north, passing just south of Bennet where a few homes sustained F3 damage. After passing south of Bennet, the storm moved back to the northeast and began to weaken to F1/F0 strength as it crossed into Otoe County, Nebraska southwest of Palmyra. The tornado finally dissipated 1 miles west southwest of Palmyra leaving 1 dead and 38 injured. In total, the tornado was on the ground for around 54 miles with a maximum intensity of F4. A total of 158 homes were leveled and 57 others were seriously damaged. The dollar amount of damage was estimated at 160 million, with 60 million of that agricultural including 100 cattle and 50 hogs lost. Some 150,000 acres of crop land sustained significant damage. The five counties were declared national disaster areas by FEMA. This tornado is also the second widest in recorded history second to the 2013 El Reno tornado at 2.6 miles wide. Peak wind speeds were estimated to be in-between 207 and 260 mph.	NWS
May 29	2004	United States	Missouri	Weatherby, Pattonsburg	3 (6 injuries)	A violent tornado touched down south of Weatherby in NW Missouri. The tornado moved east-northeast where it killed 3 people near Weatherby. 2 fatalities occurred in a destroyed frame house. Two mobile homes were destroyed with 1 fatality. The tornado crossed into Daviess County, Missouri 4 miles east of Weatherby. The tornado mainly stayed in rural areas after crossing into Daviess County, Missouri. It continued to stay over mainly rural land until it dissipated south of Bethany leaving 3 dead and 6 injured. Peak wind speeds were estimated to be in between 207 and 260 mph.	NWS
July 13	2004	United States	Illinois	Roanoke	0 (3 injuries)	2004 Roanoke tornado — A violent cone tornado touched down northeast of Metamora in central Illinois. The tornado traveled southeast, before beginning a temporary eastward jog between county roads 1300E and 1400E. The tornado curved southeast again, striking the Parsons Company, Inc.'s manufacturing plant at F4 strength along County Rd 1400 N. The plant was severely damaged by the tornado. Approximately 140 people were in the plant at the time, but all personnel made it to storm shelters in time (approximately 3 to 5 minutes before the tornado arrived). Steel beams and metal siding from the plant were found approximately three-quarters of a mile east in a farm field. From the plant, the tornado continued east, just south of Illinois Route 116/117, affecting 4 farmsteads approximately 1/2 to 1 mile east of the plant. Two of the farmsteads closest to the plant (about 1/2 to 3/4-mile east) had the 2-story houses completely blown away, with only debris remaining in the basements and nearby property. The other two farmsteads had significant damage to the 2-story houses with outbuildings demolished. The center of the tornado tracked about 100 yards south of the houses located on the south side of the road. From the plant to the farmsteads, the average width of the tornado was 400 yards and was close to 1/4-mile wide at times. The tornado was at F4 strength during the 1 mile stretch between the plant and the farmsteads. At this point, the tornado began to move more east-southeast and caused significant damage to a barn near the intersection of County Rds 1300N and 1600E, about 2.5 miles southwest of Roanoke. The tornado continued to move east-southeast and damaged a house about 1.25 miles south-southwest of Roanoke, near the intersection of County Rds 1300N and 1700E. The tornado crossed 1300N shortly afterward and curved sharply to the southeast. The tornado then lifted southeast of Roanoke leaving 3 injured. Peak wind speeds were estimated to be 240 mph.	NWS
July 18	2004	United States	North Dakota	Marion	0 (0 injuries)	A violent cone tornado touched down along 44th St SE north of Marion in southeast North Dakota. The tornado tracked south for about 4 miles along 97th Ave SE, then turned to the southeast and tracked about 6 more miles before it crossed into LaMoure County, North Dakota about 2 miles north-northwest of Marion. One abandoned farmstead 10 miles west-northwest of Litchville was nearly swept clean of its buildings. Eight to nine buildings and five to six metal grain bins were swept away. At an occupied farmstead about 9 miles west of Litchville, the most damage was reported. The family was out baling hay at the time and were not hurt. The equipment they used to bale hay (three tractors and a baler) were the only things left unscathed by the tornado. Two houses, five outbuildings, a cattle barn, and miscellaneous farm equipment were all leveled at F4 strength. Machinery and debris were scattered across the yard and in the nearby pond and fields. A new pickup truck was demolished and sheet metal and metal support beams were wrapped around trees and vehicles. About 35 cows were killed, 20 grain bins were demolished, and a semi-truck was overturned. A swath of ground scouring was estimated to be about 700 yds wide. Peak wind speeds were estimated to be in between 207 and 260 mph.	NWS
August 29	2005	Brazil	Rio Grande do Sul	Muitos Capões	0 (15 injuries)	In 2025, a re-analysis of this tornado by PREVOTS using newly discovered evidence resulted in it being upgraded from F3 to F4 (it was determined that the damage was also consistent with EF4 intensity on the newer Enhanced Fujita Scale). Among this damage were the total collapse of masonry structures, the removal of the top floor of a masonry house, and the displacement of and significant damage to a Volkswagen Beetle car.	PREVOTS
November 15	2005	United States	Kentucky	Earlington, Madisonville, Sacramento	0 (40 injuries)	Tornado outbreak of November 15, 2005 — A multiple-vortex tornado first struck Earlington at F4 intensity, with several homes being leveled, trees being "reduced to nubs", and the ground was reportedly scoured to bare soil. A steel beam was carried through the air and was found wedged against trees and other debris. The tornado then caused significant damage to Madisonville where 151 structures were destroyed and hundreds of others were damaged. This was the only violent tornado in the United States in the year 2005.	NWS
March 12	2006	United States	Missouri	Monroe City	0 (0 injuries)	Tornado outbreak sequence of March 9–13, 2006 —At the beginning of the path, the tornado impacted homes and farm buildings in rural areas of Monroe County. Two well-built homes were destroyed in that area, with one that was completely leveled. A pickup truck was thrown 100 yards into the living room of the other home, which only had one wall left standing. Debris from the leveled home was found a half-mile away. The tornado continued east, destroying 2 mobile homes and damaging 2 other homes. Numerous trees were snapped in this area. At one point, the circulation split in two, and a double funnel/damage path was observed. The tornado weakened and struck Monroe City before dissipating, where several mobile homes were destroyed on the west side of town. A church sustained considerable roof and wall damage, and other buildings suffered roof damage.	NWS
September 22	2006	United States	Missouri, Illinois	Crosstown, Murphysboro, Illinois	0 (5 injuries)	Tornado outbreak of September 21–23, 2006 —	National Weather Service
February 28	2007	United States	Kansas	Blue Mound, Mound City, Trading Post	0 (0 injuries)	Tornado outbreak of February 28 – March 2, 2007 —	NWS
March 1	2007	United States	Alabama	Millers Ferry	1 (2 injuries)	Tornado outbreak of February 28 – March 2, 2007 —	NWS
March 1	2007	United States	Alabama	Enterprise	9 (50 injuries)	Tornado outbreak of February 28 – March 2, 2007 —	NWS
April 24	2007	Mexico	Coahuila	Piedras Negras	10 (233 injuries)	Tornado outbreak sequence of April 20–27, 2007 — Major damage occurred, with numerous homes and businesses destroyed. Some of the structures were leveled, and extensive tree and power line damage occurred along the path. The worst damage occurred in the Villa de Fuente area of town.	SMN Mexico
August 26	2007	United States	North Dakota	Northwood	1 (18 injuries)		NWS
February 5	2008	United States	Arkansas	Atkins, Clinton, Mountain View, Highland	13 (140 injuries)	2008 Atkins–Clinton tornado —	NWS
February 5	2008	United States	Tennessee	Jackson	0 (51 injuries)	2008 Union University tornado —	NWS
February 5	2008	United States	Tennessee	Hardin County	3 (5 injuries)	2008 Super Tuesday tornado outbreak —	NWS
February 6	2008	United States	Alabama	Moulton, Decatur	4 (23 injuries)	2008 Super Tuesday tornado outbreak —	NWS
February 6	2008	United States	Alabama	Rosalie, Flat Rock	1 (12 injuries)	2008 Super Tuesday tornado outbreak —	NWS
May 10	2008	United States	Oklahoma, Missouri	Picher, Quapaw, Neosho, Newtonia, Purdy, McDowell	21 (350 injuries)	2008 Picher–Neosho tornado —	NWS
May 11	2008	United States	Georgia	Darien	0 (9 injuries)	Tornado outbreak sequence of May 7–11, 2008 —	NWS
May 23	2008	United States	Kansas	Quinter	0 (2 injuries)	Tornado outbreak of May 22–27, 2008 —	NWS
June 11	2008	United States	Kansas	Manhattan	0 (0 injuries)	Tornado outbreak sequence of June 3–11, 2008 —	NWS
August 3	2008	France	Nord	Pont-sur-Sambre, Hautmont, Maubeuge	3 (18 injuries)	August 2008 European tornado outbreak — The tornado rapidly strengthened immediately after hitting Pont-sur-Sambre, reaching F2-F3 strength just about 2 kilometres (1.2 mi) from the point of touchdown, and a few homes and structures sustained significant damage in this area. Minutes later, the tornado intensified to F4 intensity as it caused major damage to some rural brick homes, one of which was completely leveled to the ground at F4 (T8) strength, and the other sustaining F2 (T4-T5) damage. Winds were estimated at or over 300 kilometres per hour (190 mph) in this area and as the tornado reached a forested area, debarking or uprooting all the trees within a radius of 150 metres (160 yd). Maintaining its strength, the violent tornado struck Hautmont, flattening multiple brick homes and structures. Numerous other homes and some apartment buildings had major structural damage, and a sports complex was also severely damaged. Multiple cars were picked up and thrown hundreds of meters, some of which were hurled into buildings, and large trees were denuded and debarked. Small objects from town were also found tens of kilometers away.	ESSL
February 10	2009	United States	Texas, Oklahoma	Spanish Fort (Texas), Lone Grove (Oklahoma), Ardmore, Wilson	8 (46 injuries)	2009 Lone Grove tornado — In Lone Grove, buildings were thrown off their slabs and the local chamber of commerce office was flattened, indicating low-end EF4 intensity. The tornado destroyed businesses and residences across a swath over 0.5 mi (0.80 km) wide and 35 mi (56 km) long.	NWS
April 10	2009	United States	Tennessee	Murfreesboro	2 (58 injuries)	Tornado outbreak of April 9–11, 2009 — Nineteen minutes after touching down, the National Weather Service of Nashville issued a tornado emergency for Murfreesboro after weather spotters reported the tornado on the ground. The tornado then entered Murfreesboro and devastated the city. A two-story office building had the upper floor completely removed. Several vehicles were picked up and tossed, including numerous semi-trailer trucks. At one area, a two-story brick home was nearly destroyed with only part of a kitchen wall left standing. In another area, three homes were destroyed and thrown off their foundations, with one of the three homes not properly anchored and the other two very well constructed. A total of 845 homes sustained damage from the tornado, of which 117 were destroyed, 298 had major damage, 175 suffered minor damage and 255 were directly affected.	NWS
September 7	2009	Argentina	Tobuna, San Pedro	Tobuna, San Pedro	11	Several homes were completely swept away, trees were completely debarked, and vehicles were mangled as the tornado moved through the area.	SMN
September 7	2009	Brazil	Santa Catarina	Guaraciaba	4	The same supercell that produced the F4 tornado in Argentina spawned a second F4 tornado in Brazil. Many homes were swept away. A forested area was completely destroyed and all trees were debarked and uprooted, and cars were mangled beyond recognition. The same supercell again spawned two more tornadoes (both rated F3) near the municipality, both leaving a swath of intense forest damage.	INMETRO

== See also ==
- Tornado intensity and damage
- List of tornadoes and tornado outbreaks
  - List of F5 and EF5 tornadoes
  - List of F4 and EF4 tornadoes
    - List of F4 and EF4 tornadoes (2010–2019)
    - List of F4 and EF4 tornadoes (2020–present)
- List of tornadoes striking downtown areas
- Tornado myths
