= Tornado outbreak of June 23, 2002 =

Weather event in the United States

Meteorological history
- Formed: June 23, 2002

Tornado outbreak
- Tornadoes: 8
- Max. rating: F4 tornado
- Duration: 94 minutes

Overall effects
- Damage: ~$1 million (2002 USD)
- Areas affected: The Dakotas
- Part of the tornado outbreaks of 2002

A small but intense tornado outbreak occurred predominantly over McPherson and Brown County, South Dakota on June 23, 2002. A supercell thunderstorm produced six tornadoes in 72 minutes within the two counties. Two of the tornadoes were rated F3 and F4 respectively, and caused considerable damage to several homes and farms. Two other tornadoes occurred in North Dakota during the same time. The outbreak in Brown County was documented by a group of storm chasers and was featured on an episode of The Weather Channel's Storm Stories.

== Meteorological synopsis ==
The area hit by the outbreak was in a drought; in the past three months, the area had only received four inches of rain. On June 23, a triple point was set up across eastern South Dakota, setting the stage for a powerful supercell to form.

== Confirmed tornadoes ==
Confirmed tornadoes by Fujita rating
FU	F0	F1	F2	F3	F4	F5	Total
0	4	2	0	1	1	0	8

List of confirmed tornadoes – Sunday, June 23, 2002 (Note: All dates are based on the local time zone where the tornado touched down; however, all times are in Coordinated Universal Time for consistency.)
F#	Location	County / Parish	State	Start Coord.	Time (UTC)	Path length	Max width	Summary
F0	NE of Leola	McPherson	SD		00:20–00:22	0.2 mi (0.32 km)	50 yd (46 m)	A brief tornado caused no damage.
F1	NE of Leola to NW of Barnard	McPherson, Brown	SD		00:32–00:43	5 mi (8.0 km)	500 yd (460 m)	A barn was destroyed, a farmhouse was damaged, and many trees were downed in McPherson County. No damage was recorded in Brown County.
F0	NW of Barnard	Brown	SD		00:43–00:45	0.3 mi (0.48 km)	50 yd (46 m)	This tornado touched down as the previous tornado dissipated. No damage was reported.
F3	W of Barnard to SE of Barnard	Brown	SD		00:53–01:23	10 mi (16 km)	900 yd (820 m)	Two farmhouses sustained extensive damage, one of which lost its garage and most of its roof. Several farm buildings and equipment were heavily damaged, and a pickup truck was tossed 100 yards (91 m) into a grove of trees, totaling it. High-tension power lines and a support tower were downed, and numerous trees were downed, some of which were snapped off just above the base and/or debarked.
F0	N of Bismarck	Burleigh	ND		00:55	2 mi (3.2 km)	40 yd (37 m)	A brief tornado over open country caused no damage.
F4	SE of Barnard to NE of Barnard	Brown	SD		01:24–01:55	9 mi (14 km)	900 yd (820 m)	This violent tornado demolished two unoccupied homes and several outbuildings, damaged a farmhouse and several more outbuildings, and heavily damaged or destroyed farm equipment. Many trees were downed.
F0	E of Barnard	Brown	SD		01:30–01:32	0.1 mi (0.16 km)	50 yd (46 m)	This brief satellite tornado of the F4 tornado caused no damage.
F1	SW of Velva	Ward, McHenry	ND		01:34–01:54	2 mi (3.2 km)	50 yd (46 m)	Several homes had shingles blown off, and several trees were uprooted.

== See also ==
- Weather of 2002
- List of North American tornadoes and tornado outbreaks
- List of F4 and EF4 tornadoes
  - List of F4 and EF4 tornadoes (2000–2009)
- 2003 South Dakota tornado outbreak – Tornado outbreak that affected similar areas one year later
