= 2008 Union University tornado =

2008 EF4 tornado in Tennessee, USA

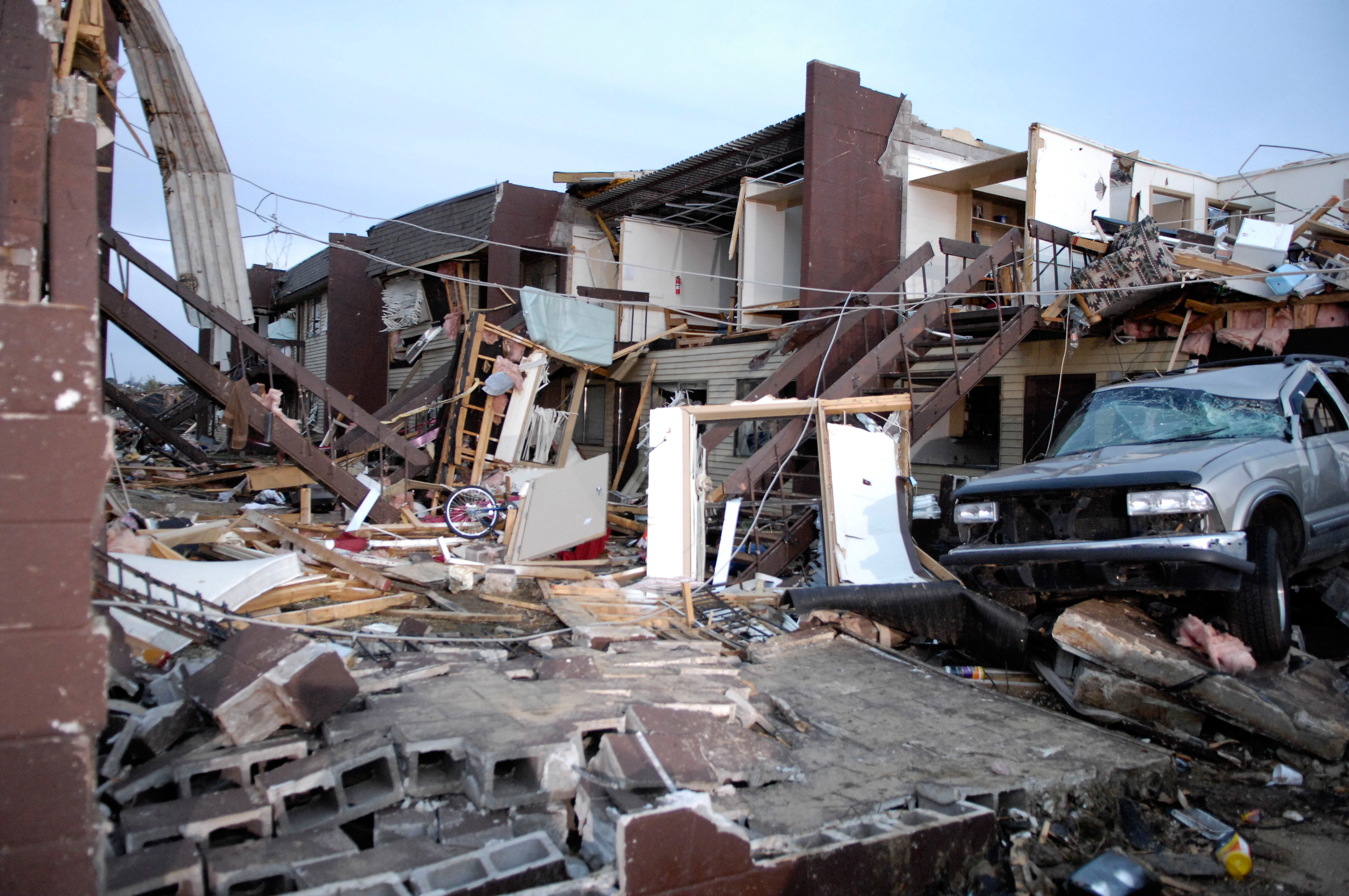
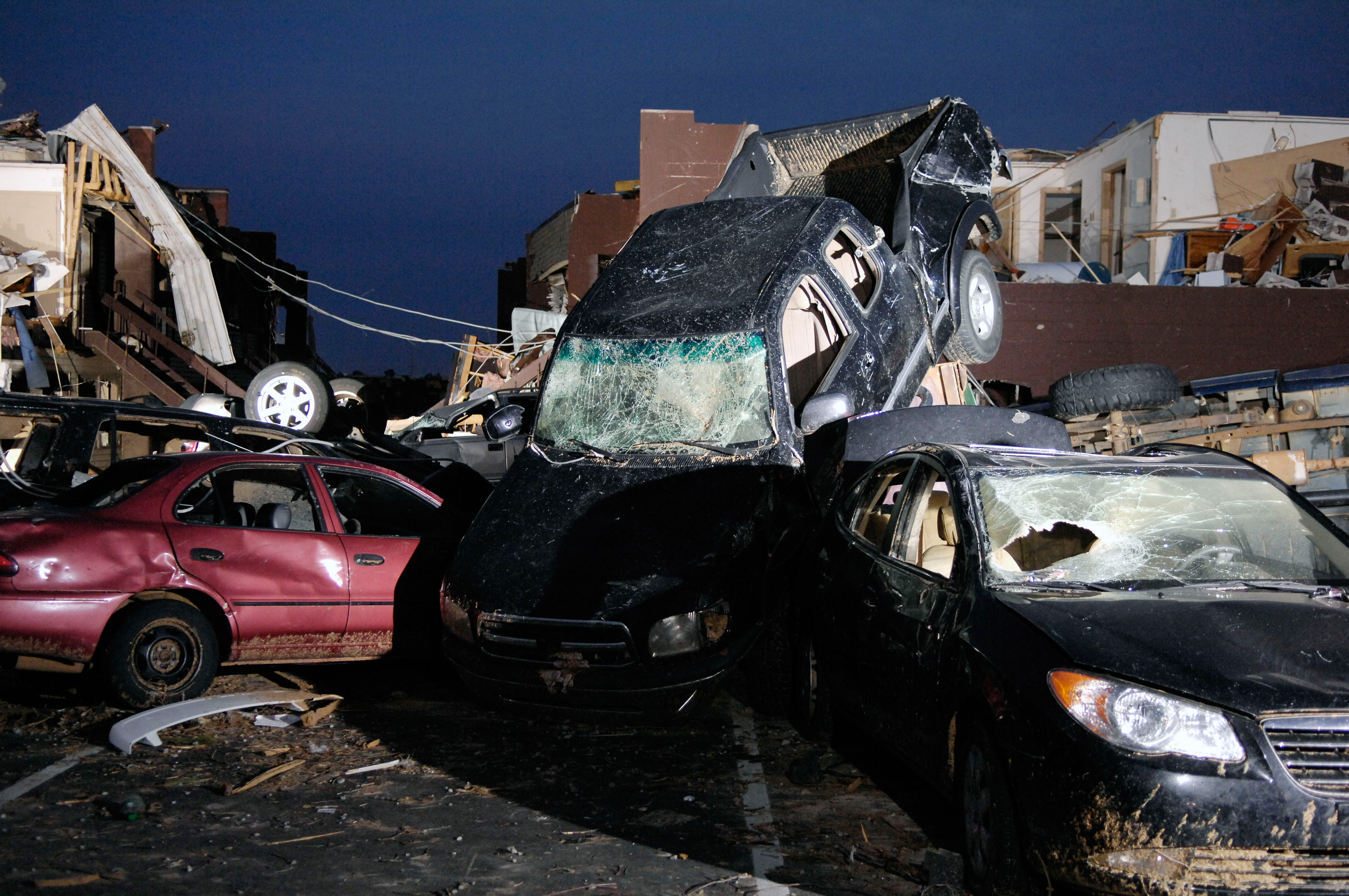
- Top and bottom: Severe damage to dormitories at Union University; Cars piled on top of each other in a Union University parking lot

Meteorological history
- Formed: February 5, 2008, 6:59 p.m. CST (UTC–04:00)
- Dissipated: February 5, 2008, 7:07 p.m. CST (UTC–04:00)
- Duration: 8 minutes

EF4 tornado
- on the Enhanced Fujita scale
- Max width: 125 yd (0.071 mi; 0.114 km)
- Path length: 7.61 mi (12.25 km)
- Highest winds: 170 mph (270 km/h)

Overall effects
- Fatalities: 0
- Injuries: 51
- Areas affected: Northern suburbs of Jackson, Tennessee, United States
- Part of the 2008 Super Tuesday tornado outbreak and Tornadoes of 2008

During the evening hours of February 5, 2008, a short-lived but violent tornado tracked 7.61 miles (12.25 km) through portions of Madison County, in the U.S. state of Tennessee. The tornado caused significant damage in the northern suburbs of the city of Jackson, and occurred as part of a deadly tornado outbreak, while the 2008 Super Tuesday primary elections were held throughout the nation. This powerful tornado was among the five EF4 tornadoes rated as such on the Enhanced Fujita scale that outbreak, and was one of two to occur in Tennessee on February 5, with the other one occurring over in Hardin County.

Along its 8-minute lifespan, the tornado, colloquially named the Union or Union University tornado, caused extensive damage throughout the northern sections of Jackson, most notably at Union University, where the tornado caused heavy damage to several campus dorms and other parts of the university. Elsewhere along its damage path, many homes and businesses were damaged or destroyed. Despite the tornado tracking through densely populated areas, only 51 people were injured and no deaths were reported.

== Meteorological synopsis ==
=== Episode narrative ===
SPC outlooks on February 5, 2008

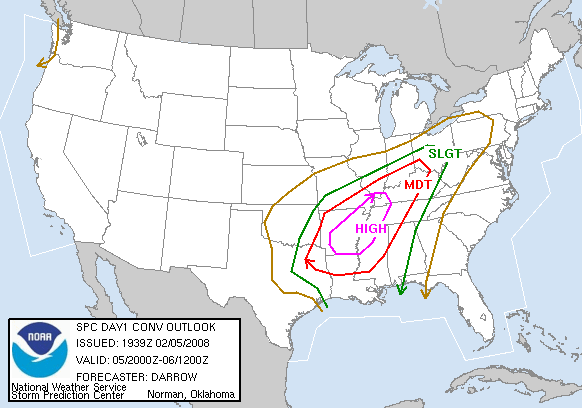
Day 1 2000z categorical outlooks.

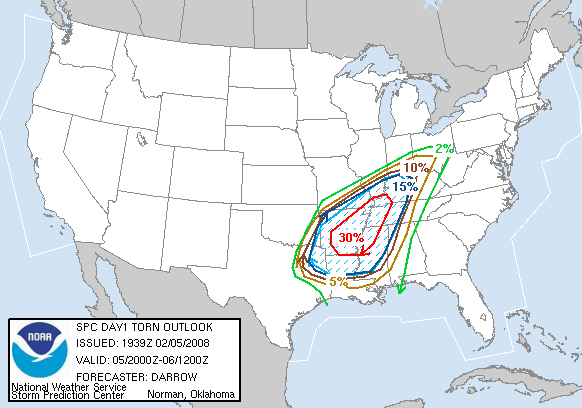
Day 1 2000z tornado outlooks.

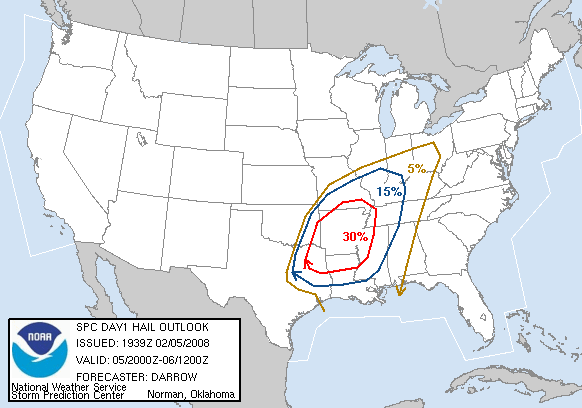
Day 1 2000z hail outlooks.

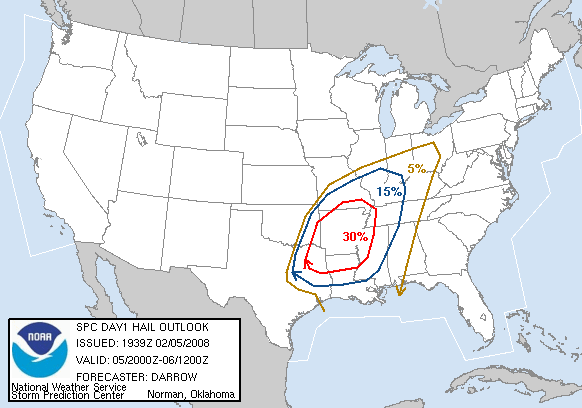
Day 1 2000z wind outlooks.

...SEVERE THUNDERSTORMS EXPECTED OVER PARTS OF THE PARTS OF THE MID SOUTH THIS AFTERNOON AND TONIGHT...

THE NWS STORM PREDICTION CENTER IN NORMAN OK IS FORECASTING THE DEVELOPMENT OF A FEW STRONG...LONG-TRACK TORNADOES OVER PARTS OF THE PARTS OF THE MID SOUTH THIS AFTERNOON AND TONIGHT.

THE AREAS MOST LIKELY TO EXPERIENCE THIS ACTIVITY INCLUDE

A LARGE PORTION OF ARKANSAS A SMALL PART OF SOUTHERN ILLINOIS PARTS OF WESTERN KENTUCKY SMALL PART OF SOUTHEASTERN MISSOURI NORTHWESTERN MISSISSIPPI WESTERN TENNESSEE

SURROUNDING THE HIGH RISK AREA...THERE IS A MODERATE RISK OF SEVERE THUNDERSTORMS FROM PORTIONS OF EASTERN OK/SOUTHERN MO EAST-NORTHEASTWARD INTO THE OHIO RIVER VALLEY AND ACROSS THE LOWER MISSISSIPPI RIVER VALLEY
$$

— National Weather Service Norman, Oklahoma, Public Severe Weather Outlook, 10:41 a.m. CST, February 5, 2008.

One day earlier at 7:00 p.m. CST (19:00 UTC) on February 4, the NOAA Storm Prediction Center (SPC) issued a widespread level 2/5 slight risk across the central United States, from central Texas to western Indiana. Accompanying it was a 5% tornado risk that spanned from northeastern Texas, eastern Oklahoma, western and northern Arkansas, and southern Missouri. During the overnight hours at 12:00 a.m. CST (06:00 UTC) on February 5, the SPC drastically took measures, and issued a large level 4/5 moderate risk for states within the Mississippi River Valley. A Public Severe Weather Outlook (PWO) was in effect due to the forecast of an outbreak of severe thunderstorms, widespread and damaging winds, and a few but strong tornadoes in an area from northern Louisiana, to southern Illinois and Indiana. Large 15% hatched, 45% and 30% risks for tornadoes, damaging winds and large hail encompassed portions of mainly Arkansas, Louisiana, Mississippi, Tennessee and Kentucky.

A strong, upper-level trough was transforming in the Four Corners region, and forecasted to lift northeastwards towards the southern Great Plains and mid-Mississippi River Valley regions. Mid and upper level jet streaks strengthened downstream from the Ark-La-Tex, towards the lower Ohio River Valley area. Near the surface, a low-pressure area in the Red River Valley, over central Oklahoma and north-central Texas was expected to deepen in nature whilst maturing to the northeast into north-central Arkansas, and southern Ohio later.

A nearby dry line over the southern Great Plains that accompanied the low area, was noted by the forecasters to evolve into a Pacific cold front as it headed east towards Arkansas and Louisiana. At the same time, a second but more potent cold front surged southeastwards from western Texas and central Oklahoma, taking over the Pacific cold front after at midnight in the Mississippi River Valley.

Around seven hours later at 7:00 a.m. CST (13:00 UTC) on February 5, the SPC increased the general categorical outlooks to a level 5/5 "high risk" of 30% chances of tornadoes for eastern Arkansas, northwestern Mississippi and extreme southwestern Tennessee. The environment was conducive enough for potentially long-lived tornadic supercells, within the Midsouth region of the contiguous United States. Deep, upper-level troughs, and associated extreme mid and upper-level wind fields in excess of 90 knots (100 miles per hour; 170 kilometres per hour) bolstered the severe threat of storms from the southern Great Plains, towards the northern Gulf states and Ohio River Valley later into the day.

Widespread, elevated storms increased in prevalence in the morning, due to the accompanying ejecting lower amplitude trough over northern Texas and most of Oklahoma. Additional thunderstorms persisted and began to backbuild in a large region of near-surface warm advection and enhanced lift, located near the cold front that moved southwards across the Ohio River Valley. Surface low area developed over far northern Texas, and expected to deepen as it lifted northeastwards along the surface front into northern Arkansas and southern Indiana later. The upper storm system ejected the dry line/north-south oriented surface trough eastwards, across the southern Great Plains in the morning, to the lower and mid-Mississippi River Valleys. Later, the front that followed the shortwave trough moved into the upper Midwest, was expected to stall and lift marginally north tonight as a warm front, in response to the intensifying surface low area over the Ohio River Valley. Persistent moisture encompassed a broad region within the warm sector from eastern Texas to the Tennessee River Valley, as surface dew points rose into the 60° degree Fahrenheit (15.5° Celsius) range.

=== Event narrative ===
At 10:30 a.m. CST (16:30 UTC) on the day of the event, the SPC situated the high risk, 30% tornado outlook to the Missouri Bootheel and extreme extreme Kentucky, with most of western Tennessee also encompassed under the hazardous risk. At 2:00 p.m. CST (20:00 UTC) at midday, the latest visible satellite imagery showcased the leading edge of the area of large scale lift, began to interact with the dry line over Texas. The region of where Cumulonimbus clouds were growing expanded to the Interstate 35 corridor. East of the dry line in southeastern Oklahoma, abundant sunshine was noted in a large area in that state. The unstable air mass heated up into the 70°F (21.1°C) range. Atmospheric sounding data from earlier at 12:00 p.m. CST (18:00 UTC) in the lower Mississippi River, towards north of the Gulf of Mexico suggested the strong capping inversion weakened, and become negligent as adjacent lift gets more prominent. A powerful, 110 kn (130 mph; 200 km/h) jet streak ejected into region spanning the Ark-La-Tex to western Kentucky and Tennessee. Extreme vertical shear profiles bolstered the storm potential. Despite a mode for discrete storms being highly anticipated, storm mergers and convective outflow gave signs to a very dangerous and damaging wind threat. Alongside the wind threat, large hail was more than likely to occur in supercells across the western half of the high risk outlook.

== Tornado summary ==
=== Preceding EF3 tornado ===
Prior to the Union tornado, a long-track, (Note: Long-track is defined as traversing 30–60 miles (48–97 km) or more.) and deadly EF3 tornado touched down in Fayette County, Tennessee, near the unincorporated community of Yum Yum at 6:21 p.m. CST (00:21 UTC). Right after formation, the tornado struck a residence at EF3 intensity on Yum Yum Road, killing a man who was sitting inside his vehicle within a shed. The truck was moved at least 40 feet (12 m) from its original spot and severely damaged, along with other vehicles. The tornado entered Haywood County and barreled towards Dancyville and Hillville at EF2 intensity. Two homes in Dancyville were both heavily damaged or destroyed, alongside a church and trees that were uprooted. In Hillville, many structures, including a convenience store, suffered varying levels of damage before the tornado left for Madison County. Now passing by Denmark, the tornado traversed the landscape, before impacting Huntersville at EF3 strength.

Two homes out of multiple in the community, including one on Huntersville-Denmark Road, were leveled and had both of their elderly occupants killed. The St. John #2 Baptist Church also suffered extensive damage, with a bus thrown hundreds of feet. On Interstate 40, numerous vehicles were blown off the road, such as one car that was thrown 75 yards (69 m) into a farm field, before the tornado dissipated at 6:54 p.m. CST (00:54 UTC). This intense and lethal tornado traveled for 31.13 miles (50.10 km) and was up to 600 yards (550 m) wide. Three elderly people were killed and 14 others were injured.

=== Union EF4 tornado ===
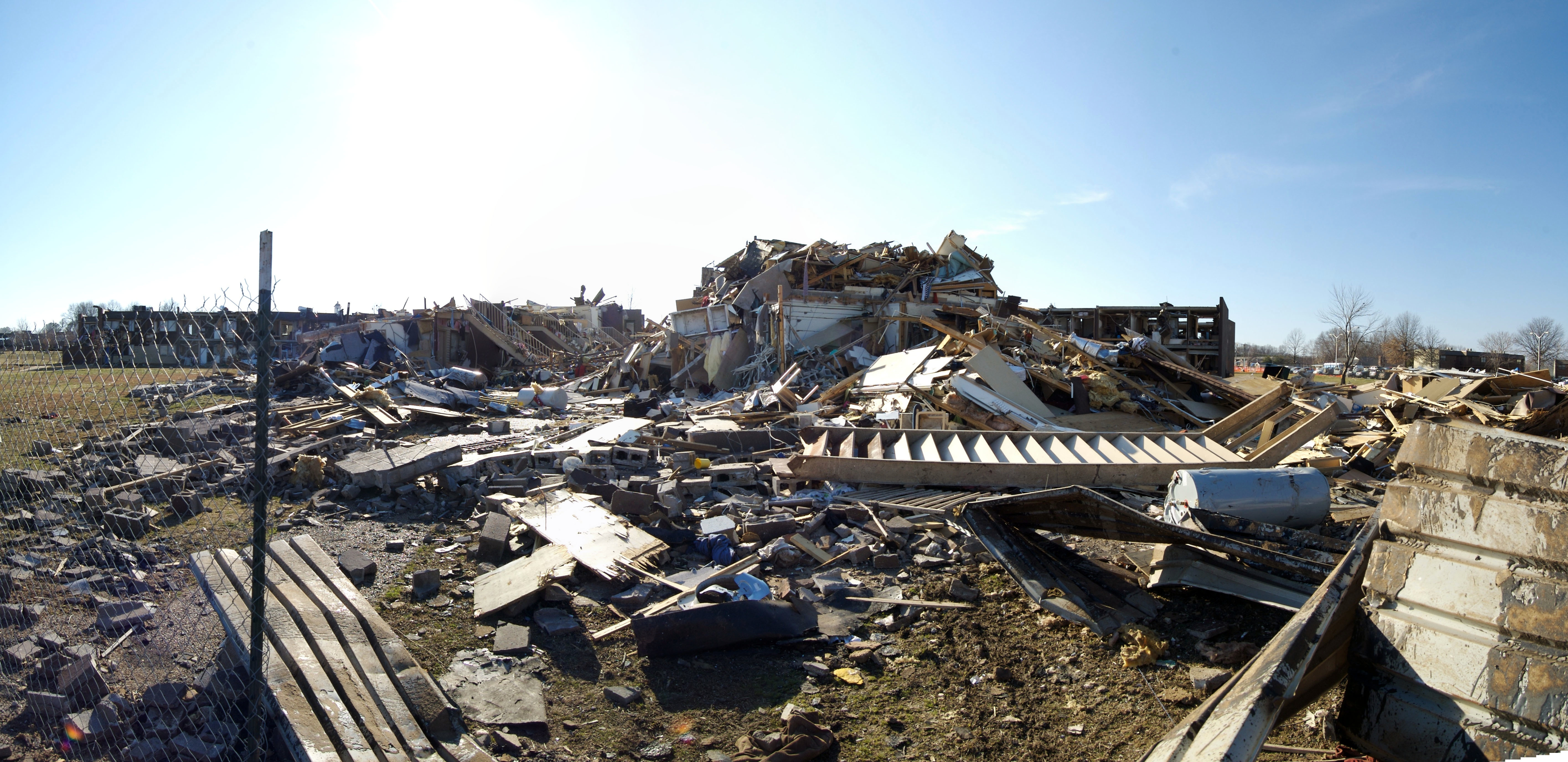
EF4 damage to dormitories at Union University.

The tornado first touched down at 6:59 p.m. CST (00:59 UTC) at Union University near the US 45 Bypass, before inflicting significant damage to various structures on the campus. Quickly reaching EF4 intensity with maximum estimated wind speeds of 170 mph (270 km/h), the tornado collapsed two dormitories, with 80% of the dorms being extensively damaged or destroyed. Students followed the university's emergency plan and sought shelter in bathrooms and interior rooms as the tornado continued to inflict damage. Around 1,200 students were in the campus dorms at the time, with 11 being trapped under the debris and 51 sustaining injuries.

The tornado then impacted 17 academic buildings, with three suffering severe damage. Hundreds of vehicles in the campus parking lots were damaged or destroyed by the tornado before it crossed the US 45 Bypass and damaged several banks and other businesses. The tornado then struck the Regional Hospital and several nearby doctors' offices before continuing into northern portions of Jackson, where it tracked across several subdivisions.

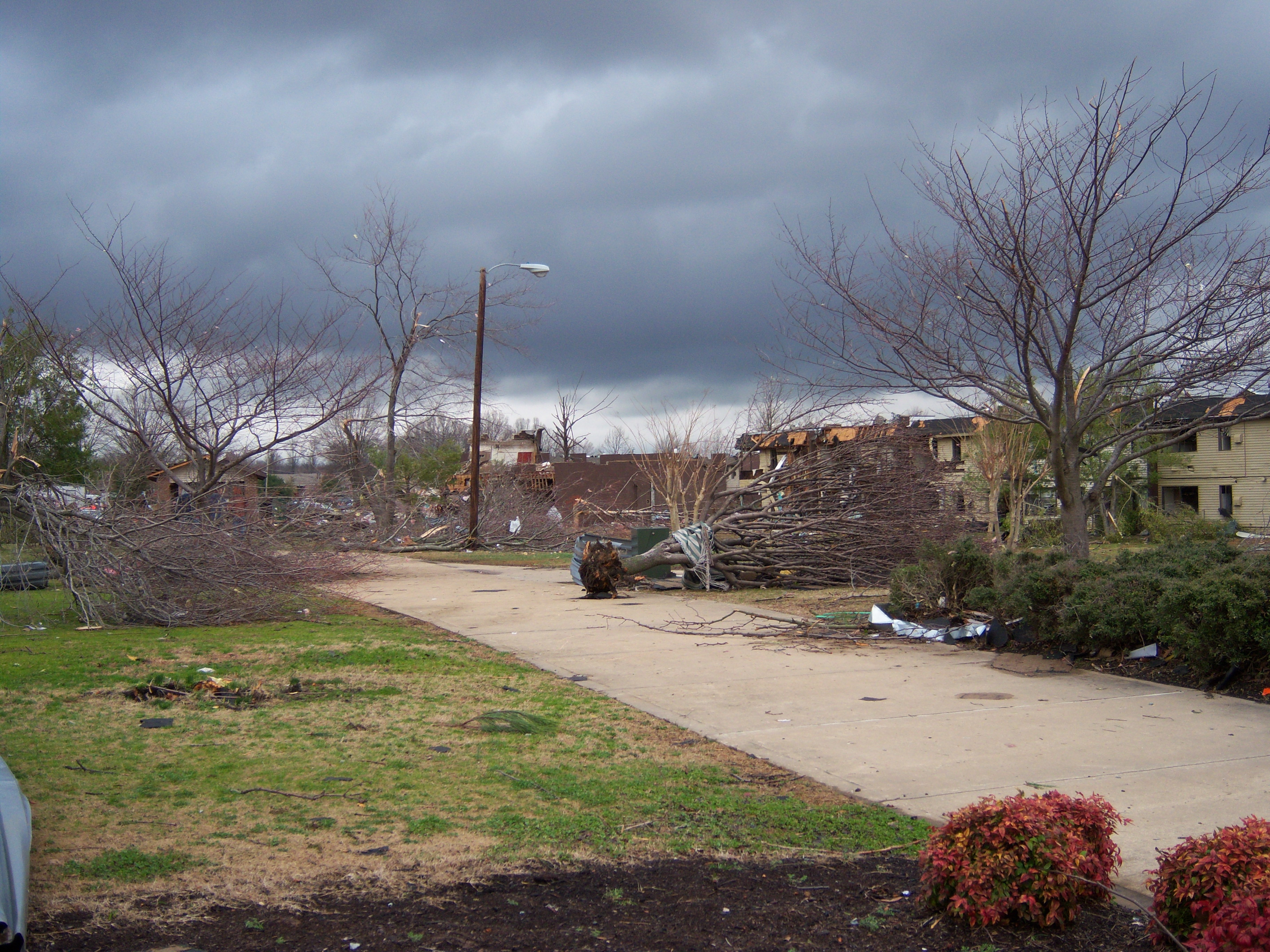
Tornado damage in urban areas of Jackson.

The tornado struck the subdivisions of Chapel Creek, Indian Hills, and Wyndhurst, and also inflicted damage to the Jackson Oaks Senior Living Complex before continuing to move northeastward. The tornado then impacted the Northside High School in the Oak Hill region and tracked across the Walnut Trace subdivision. The tornado crossed Old Medina Road and continued to damage homes, causing EF3 damage with estimated wind speeds of 145 mph (233 km/h) near the Christmasville Road/Ashport Road intersection where Madison County Fire Station 11 was destroyed. The station's fire engine, and water, brush, and pumper trucks sustained damage, and various homes in the area were also impacted. The tornado then quickly dissipated at 7:07 p.m. CST (12:07 UTC) after being on the ground for 7.61 miles (12.25 km).

The Union tornado was the third of a handful of violent tornadoes (F4/EF4+ on the Fujita and Enhanced Fujita scales) to strike the Jackson area in 10 years. Prior to the 2008 storm, the city was struck on May 4, 2003 and January 17, 1999.

== Aftermath ==
=== Damage ===
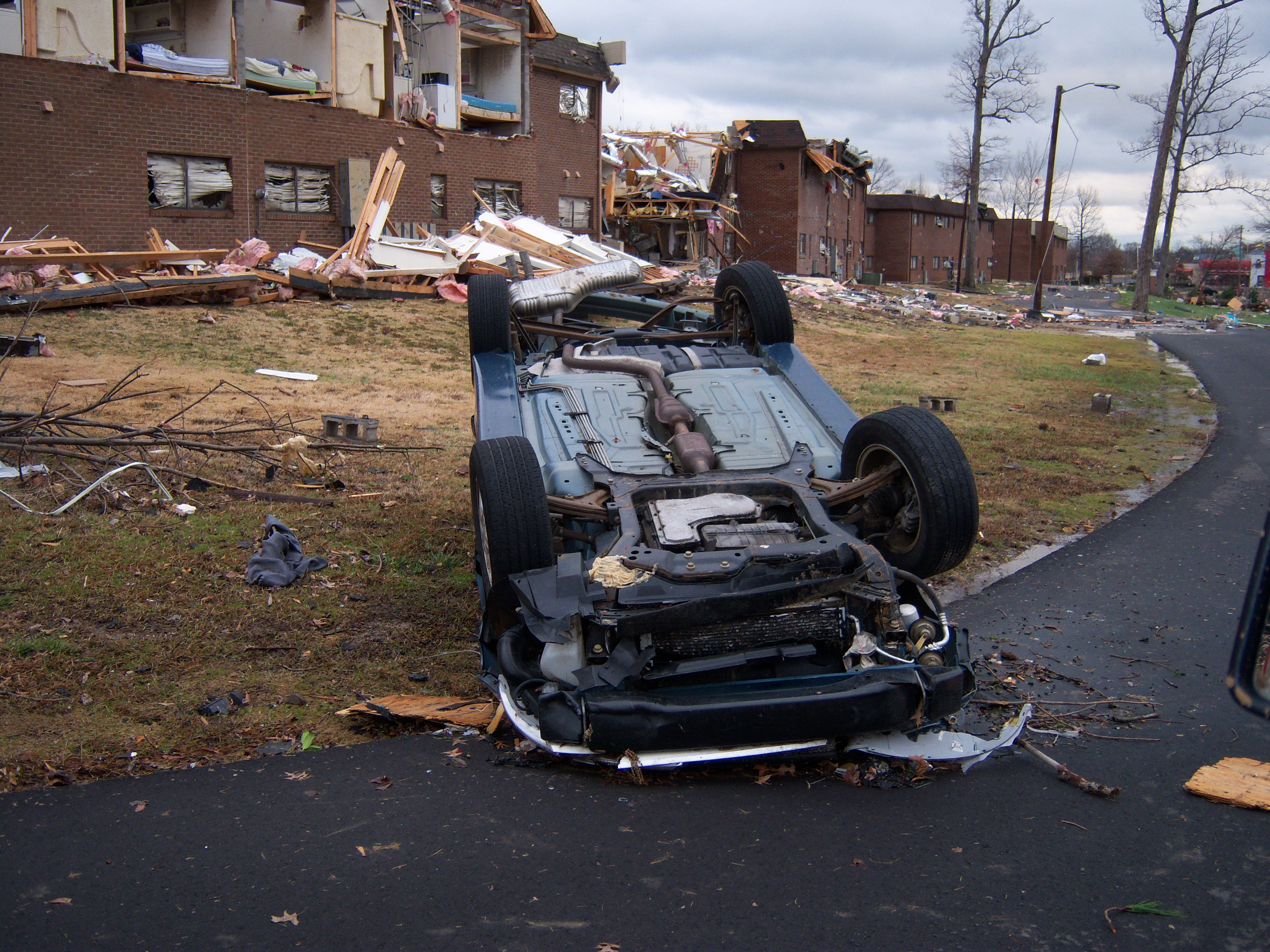
A car that was flipped upside down by the tornado.

Along its track, the tornado completely destroyed 70 structures, with over 500 others sustaining damage. At Union University, two dormitories completely collapsed and several others were impacted, with 80% of the dorms being destroyed or damaged, with the women's dormitories being more heavily impacted. An additional 17 buildings on the campus were damaged, with three suffering from major damage. The roof of the Jennings Hall was torn away, and several hundred vehicles in the campus parking lots were overturned and destroyed. Around $40 million (2008 USD) (Note: All amounts of money are in 2008 USD unless stated otherwise.) in damages was inflicted at Union University alone.

The tornado damaged numerous businesses and institutions, including banks, doctors' offices, and a hospital. Several subdivisions were also impacted, with numerous homes suffering damage. The Jackson Oaks Senior Living Complex was heavily damaged, and a store near North Side High School was destroyed. Signs off of I-40 were carried five miles and deposited in the back of a property along Ashport Road. Madison County Fire Station 11 was demolished, and several of its vehicles also sustained damage. In all, the tornado inflicted $100 million in damages.

=== Recovery efforts ===
Directly following the tornado, it was discovered that 11 students were trapped in the debris from the Union University dormitories. The Madison County fire chief ordered that 100 body bags be brought to the scene due to the dorms being heavily impacted and the large amount of students on campus. However, no students were killed, though dozens were injured, some seriously. Union University President Dr. David Dockery described the tornado as one of the worst natural disasters to happen at a college campus in United States history. On the night of February 6, Tennessee National Guard troops guarded the campus, securing the damaged dorms and academic buildings before assisting students in finding belongings the following morning.

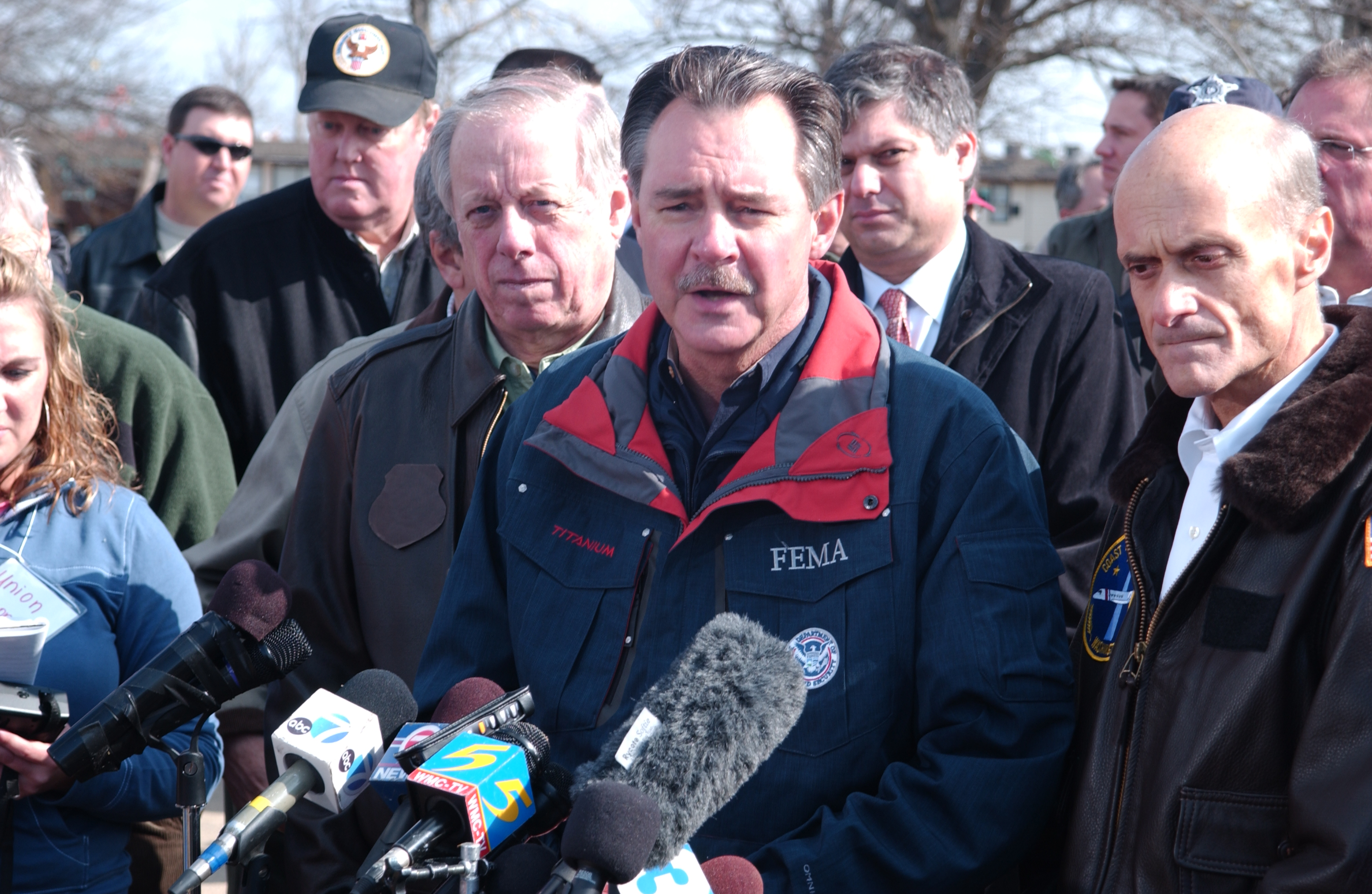
David Paulison, Michael Chertoff, and other officials at Union University.

The day following the tornado, around 1,000 volunteers assisted the university with cleanup and recovery. On February 7, Homeland Security Secretary Michael Chertoff, FEMA Administrator David Paulison, and Tennessee Governor Phil Bredesen toured the damage at Union University, with Chertoff stating that “We’re going to be here, to stand shoulder to shoulder with the governor and help you get cleaned up and get back to school.” President George W. Bush issued a major disaster declaration for the state of Tennessee following the outbreak, allowed individuals in Hardin, Macon, Madison, Shelby, and Sumner counties to receive federal assistance, including grants, low-cost loans, and other supporting programs. Faculty and staff at Union University met with students at a nearby shopping center and helped match them with volunteers who were offering temporary housing, and various local churches utilized buses to transport students to their temporary homes.

The Union University Disaster Relief Fund was established, where donations could be received. Radio station KCBI, located in Dallas, Texas, scheduled a three-hour-long telethon for February 8 to help support the campus, and at Southwestern Baptist Theological Seminary, students and faculty raised $5,000 USD to help fund cleanup efforts.

In the days following the tornado, two of the Union University dormitories that suffered the worst damage were torn down. A residential complex was under construction on the campus before the tornado, but was discontinued in the wake of the damage and in favor of a larger living complex. The new complex consisted of 14 buildings, and housed around 700 students. The complex was completed less than seven months after the tornado, and several other buildings were fully repaired. In February 2010, the Bowld Student Commons building was completed, which was the last tornado-damaged structure on campus to be rebuilt.

On February 5, 2013, exactly five years after the tornado, Union University students, faculty, and alumni held a gathering to remember the tornado and the recovery that followed.

=== Casualties ===
The tornado injured 51 students at the impacted dormitories on the Union University campus, nine of whom sustained injuries classified as severe and stayed overnight at a nearby hospital. Several students suffered from broken bones and serious lacerations, though the majority of patients only suffered minor injuries and were released within a few hours of being admitted. Despite the serious damage inflicted, no fatalities were attributed to the tornado.

== Union University's history with tornadoes ==
Just after midnight on November 10, 2002, an F1 tornado struck Union University and a nearby subdivision. The tornado reached a max width of 220 yards (0.20 km) and tracked for 4 miles (6.4 km). The tornado inflicted $2.6 million (2002 USD) in damages at the campus, with several buildings being severely damaged and over 500 cars being affected. Along its path, one home was destroyed and 150 residences and businesses sustained damage. David S. Dockery stated that the 2008 tornado was "15 times worse" than the one that struck in 2002.

== See also ==
- 2008 Super Tuesday tornado outbreak
- List of F4, EF4, and IF4 tornadoes
- List of F4 and EF4 tornadoes (2000–2009)
- Tornadoes of 2008
- 2008 Atkins–Clinton tornado - Another EF4 tornado apart of the same tornado outbreak.
- 2009 Murfreesboro tornado - The next violent tornado to hit Tennessee.
