= Disappearances of Shaina Kirkpatrick and Shausha Henson =

American children missing since 2001

Shaina Kirkpatrick
- Born: Shaina Ashley Kirkpatrick; April 27, 1997; Portland, Oregon, U.S.
- Disappeared: April 4, 2001 (aged 3); Portland, Oregon, U.S.
- Status: Missing for 25 years, 4 months and 24 days

Shausha Henson
- Born: Shausha Latine Henson; January 26, 2001; Portland, Oregon, U.S.
- Disappeared: April 4, 2001 (aged 2 months); Portland, Oregon, U.S.
- Status: Missing for 25 years, 4 months and 24 days

Shaina Ashley Kirkpatrick (born April 27, 1997) and her sister, Shausha Latine Henson (born January 26, 2001), are two missing American children who vanished under mysterious circumstances in 2001 from Portland, Oregon, United States. (Note: While the siblings went missing en route to California, the Federal Bureau of Investigation's website lists them as missing from Portland, Oregon, where they resided and from where they departed; the Portland Police Bureau is listed as the agency in charge of the case.) The siblings accompanied their mother, Kimyala Henson, on a road trip with Kimyala's childhood friend, Christina Noel Mayer, and Mayer's boyfriend, Frank Lee Oehring. The group had intended to travel to Canada, but first drove to California, where Kimyala obtained her birth certificate.

Two weeks later, Mayer and Oehring were found dead in a murder–suicide at a rest area in Collier County, Florida. Eight days later, Kimyala Henson's body was discovered in a rural area near Pyramid Lake in Nevada; she had been bludgeoned with a hatchet and shot to death. Mayer and Oehring were assumed responsible for Kimyala's murder, and evidence showed that Mayer had assumed Henson's identity and that she and Oehring had used Kimyala's credit cards to purchase gasoline and food.

Despite widespread searches, neither Shaina Kirkpatrick nor Shausha Henson were ever located. As of 2026, their whereabouts remain unknown.

== Timeline ==
=== Background and disappearance ===
The siblings, Shaina Kirkpatrick (age 3) and Shausha Henson (2 months), departed on a road trip from their home in Portland, Oregon, with their mother, Kimyala Henson. Kimyala was accompanied by her childhood friend, Christina Noel Mayer, and Frank Lee Oehring, a fugitive from Stewartsville, Missouri wanted by police after the attempted murder of his ex-wife. Mayer introduced Oehring to Kimyala as her husband, using the pseudonym of Curtis. Oehring reportedly led a Satanist group in Missouri, of which Mayer was an alleged member.

Mayer and Oehring made a surprise visit to the Portland area on approximately April 2, 2001, claiming they were scouting locations with the intent of possibly moving there. Mayer was able to contact Kimyala using a phone book. The former childhood friends spent a week together before Oehring offered to take Mayer, Kimyala, and her daughters on a vacation to British Columbia, Canada, an invitation Kimyala accepted.

Kimyala and her daughters were last seen at a hotel in Redding, California on April 5, 2001, accompanied by Mayer and Oehring. Earlier that day, the group had stopped in Sacramento to obtain Kimyala's birth certificate, as it is believed Mayer and Oehring convinced her she would need the document to enter Canada. Two days after the group had embarked on their road trip, Kimyala's mother died in Portland; when family members attempted to contact her by phone to notify her of the news, they were unable to reach her.

=== Murder–suicide of Mayer and Oehring ===
On April 20, 2001, an off-duty deputy found Mayer shot to death with a .22 caliber rifle in an apparent murder–suicide beside a picnic table at a rest area in Collier County, Florida. Oehring, who had shot himself in the head nearby, was still alive. He was flighted to Lee Memorial Hospital in Naples, where he died later that day. In a garbage can at the rest area, Kimyala's birth certificate was discovered by authorities, torn in half. Further investigation yielded that Kimyala's credit cards had been used to purchase gasoline and food through numerous states between April 6 and April 9, 2001, and that Mayer had fraudulently obtained a Nevada state identification card using Kimyala's identity. The Kia Sephia that the group had traveled in was left parked at the rest area; inside the car, a diaper bag was found, but no other evidence of the missing children could be located.

=== Discovery of Kimyala Henson ===
On April 28, 2001, eight days after the discovery of Mayer and Oehring, Kimyala Henson's body was found partially buried near Pyramid Lake, approximately 37 miles (60 km) north of Wadsworth, Nevada. She had been bludgeoned with a hatchet and shot to death. Ballistics analysis concluded that Kimyala had been shot with the same gun used in Mayer and Oehring's murder–suicide.

=== Developments ===
As of 2026, the whereabouts of Kirkpatrick and Henson remain unknown.

== See also ==
- List of people who disappeared mysteriously (2000–present)
