= Absolom Riggs House =

Historic house in Missouri, United States

- U.S. National Register of Historic Places
- Location within Missouri Location within the United States
- Location: SR 1, near Weatherby, Missouri
- Coordinates: 39°55′32″N 94°15′12″W
- Area: 2.5 acres (1.0 ha)
- Built: c. 1865, 1902
- Built by: Riggs, Absolom Hicks
- NRHP reference No.: 82004635
- Added to NRHP: April 12, 1982

Absolom Riggs House, also known as the Mathias House, is a historic home located near Weatherby, DeKalb County, Missouri. It was built about 1865, and is a two-story brick dwelling with an ell shaped plan. It has a gable roof and an addition was built in 1902. It is one of two examples of brick architecture in the county (the other is the Dalton-Uphoff House).

It was listed on the National Register of Historic Places in 1982.
