= Dalton-Uphoff House =

Historic house in Missouri, United States

- U.S. National Register of Historic Places
- Location within Missouri Location within the United States
- Location: North of Stewartsville, near Stewartsville, Missouri
- Coordinates: 39°51′12″N 94°29′58″W
- Area: 2.5 acres (1.0 ha)
- Built: c. 1850
- Built by: Dalton, Richmond
- NRHP reference No.: 82004634
- Added to NRHP: April 12, 1982

The Dalton-Uphoff House (also known as the David Delaney House) is a historic house located near Stewartsville, DeKalb County, Missouri.

== Description and history ==
It was built about 1850, and is a two-story brick dwelling with an ell shaped plan and a gabled roof. It was designed by Richmond Dalton, and is one of two examples of brick architecture in the county (the other is the Absolom Riggs House).

It was listed on the National Register of Historic Places on April 12, 1982.
