= Palmyra, Nebraska =

- Village
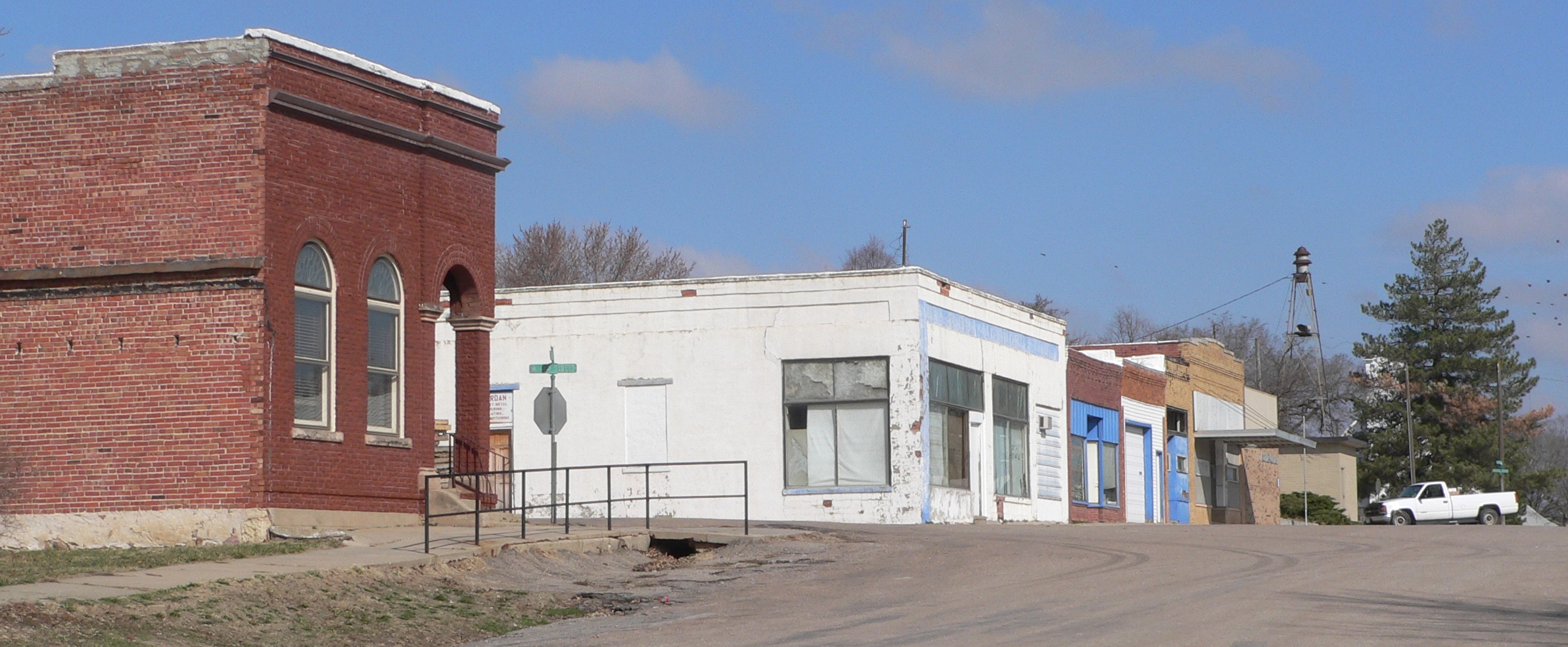
- Downtown Palmyra.

- Location of Palmyra, Nebraska
- Coordinates: 40°42′21″N 96°23′32″W
- Country: United States
- State: Nebraska
- County: Otoe

Area
  - Total: 0.34 sq mi (0.88 km^{2})
  - Land: 0.34 sq mi (0.88 km^{2})
  - Water: 0 sq mi (0.00 km^{2})
- Elevation: 1,201 ft (366 m)

Population (2020)
  - Total: 534
  - Density: 1,569.2/sq mi (605.88/km^{2})
- Time zone: UTC-6 (Central (CST))
  - Summer (DST): UTC-5 (CDT)
- ZIP code: 68418
- Area code: 402
- FIPS code: 31-38190
- GNIS feature ID: 2399615

Palmyra is a village in northwest Otoe County, Nebraska, United States. The population was 534 at the 2020 census.

== History ==
Palmyra was platted in 1870. Its name commemorates the ancient city of Palmyra.

== Geography ==
According to the United States Census Bureau, the village has a total area of 0.34 square miles (0.88 km^{2}), all land.

== Demographics ==
Historical population
Census	Pop.	Note	%±
1880	239		—
1900	301		—
1910	334		11.0%
1920	317		−5.1%
1930	344		8.5%
1940	401		16.6%
1950	372		−7.2%
1960	377		1.3%
1970	386		2.4%
1980	512		32.6%
1990	545		6.4%
2000	546		0.2%
2010	545		−0.2%
2020	534		−2.0%
U.S. Decennial Census

=== 2010 census ===
As of the census of 2010, there were 545 people, 207 households, and 146 families living in the village. The population density was 1,602.9 inhabitants per square mile (618.9/km^{2}). There were 227 housing units at an average density of 667.6 per square mile (257.8/km^{2}). The racial makeup of the village was 96.0% White, 1.7% African American, 0.6% Asian, 0.2% from other races, and 1.7% from two or more races. Hispanic or Latino of any race were 1.1% of the population.

There were 207 households, of which 36.7% had children under the age of 18 living with them, 56.0% were married couples living together, 7.2% had a female householder with no husband present, 7.2% had a male householder with no wife present, and 29.5% were non-families. 24.6% of all households were made up of individuals, and 10.6% had someone living alone who was 65 years of age or older. The average household size was 2.63 and the average family size was 3.15.

The median age in the village was 36.4 years. 27.9% of residents were under the age of 18; 6.2% were between the ages of 18 and 24; 28% were from 25 to 44; 25.4% were from 45 to 64; and 12.5% were 65 years of age or older. The gender makeup of the village was 51.0% male and 49.0% female.

=== 2000 census ===
As of the census of 2000, there were 546 people, 209 households, and 150 families living in the village. The population density was 1,597.8 inhabitants per square mile (616.9/km^{2}). There were 225 housing units at an average density of 658.4 per square mile (254.2/km^{2}). The racial makeup of the village was 98.72% White, 0.18% African American, 0.18% from other races, and 0.92% from two or more races. Hispanic or Latino of any race were 1.83% of the population.

There were 209 households, out of which 45.5% had children under the age of 18 living with them, 57.4% were married couples living together, 10.0% had a female householder with no husband present, and 27.8% were non-families. 24.4% of all households were made up of individuals, and 9.6% had someone living alone who was 65 years of age or older. The average household size was 2.61 and the average family size was 3.13.

In the village, the population was spread out, with 31.0% under the age of 18, 6.6% from 18 to 24, 30.6% from 25 to 44, 22.5% from 45 to 64, and 9.3% who were 65 years of age or older. The median age was 34 years. For every 100 females, there were 107.6 males. For every 100 females age 18 and over, there were 103.8 males.

As of 2000 the median income for a household in the village was $39,773, and the median income for a family was $47,083. Males had a median income of $31,607 versus $24,500 for females. The per capita income for the village was $16,632. About 6.2% of families and 5.8% of the population were below the poverty line, including 10.8% of those under age 18 and none of those age 65 or over.
