= Mermet Lake State Fish and Wildlife Area =

State park located in Illinois

- IUCN category IV (habitat/species management area)
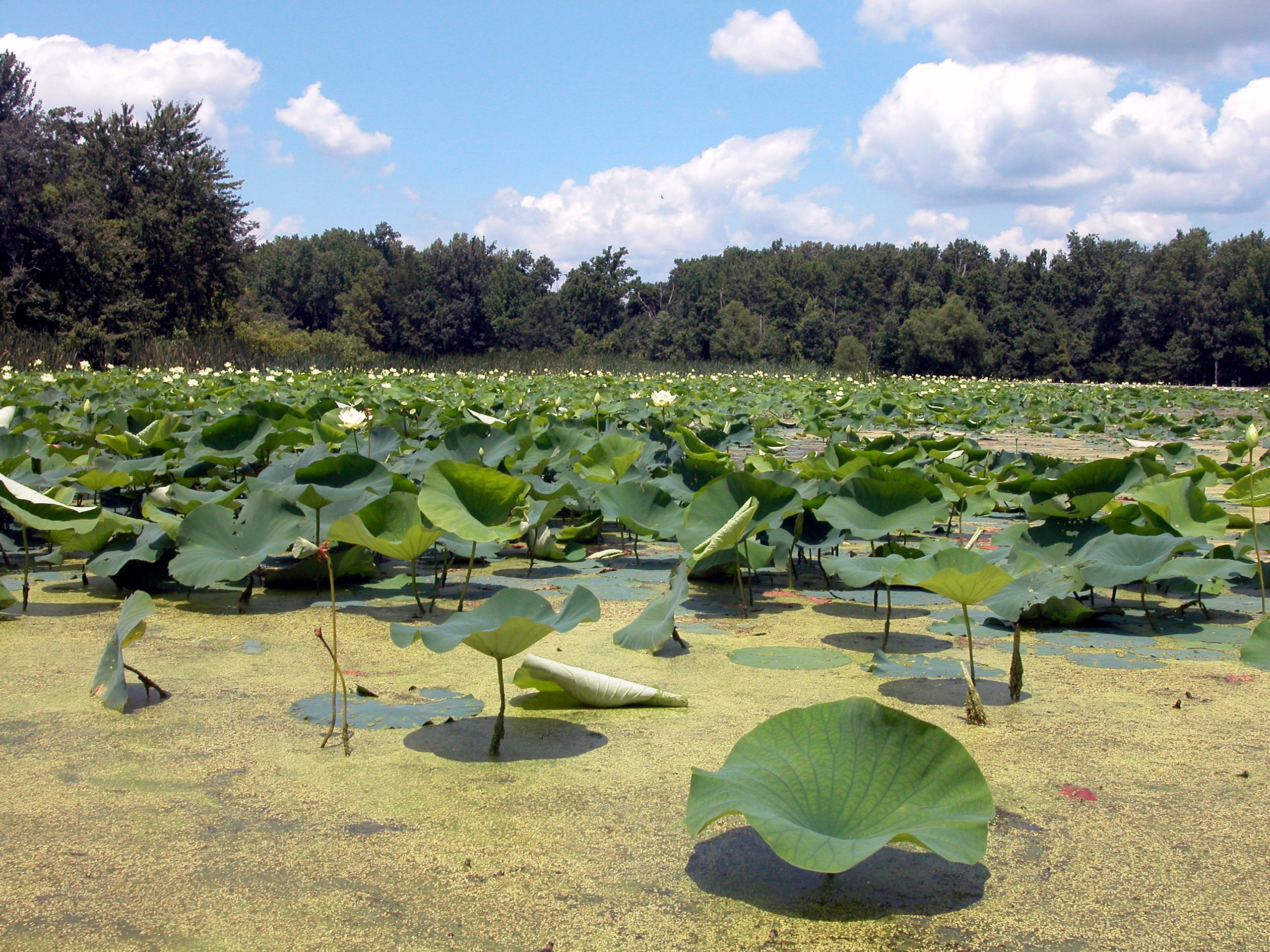

- Location within Illinois Location within the United States
- Location: Massac County, Illinois, U.S.
- Nearest city: Mermet, Illinois
- Coordinates: 37°15′44″N 88°51′02″W
- Area: 2,630 acres (1,060 ha)
- Established: 1949
- Governing body: Illinois Department of Natural Resources

Mermet Lake State Fish and Wildlife Area is an Illinois state park on 2,630 acres (1,060 ha) and 690 acres (280 ha) of water Massac County, Illinois, United States. It is an old cypress swamp that sports abundant fowl and fish. It also has hiking trails and a large archery competition called the Pro/Am National Archery Tournament, which is among the largest in the country. The land was acquired by the Government of Illinois in 1949.

Its ecosystem contains panfish, channel catfish, largemouth bass, Canada geese, ducks, and snow geese.
