= Hillerman, Illinois =

- Unincorporated community
- Location within Illinois Location within the United States
- Coordinates: 37°14′12″N 88°53′23″W
- Country: United States
- State: Illinois
- County: Massac
- Elevation: 390 ft (120 m)
- Time zone: UTC-6 (Central (CST))
  - Summer (DST): UTC-5 (CDT)
- Area code: 618
- GNIS feature ID: 410277

Hillerman is an unincorporated community in Massac County, Illinois, United States. Hillerman is 3.5 miles (5.6 km) west-northwest of Joppa.

Hillerman was established sometime prior to 1835 and named for a riverman, L.D. Hillerman. Hats were made in the village. By 1843, the town had a post office and an Ohio River wharf, warehouse, store, and various businesses. The post office was discontinued in 1851, and repeated flooding of the river led to the original town's discontinuance by the 1870s. The modern Hillerman is located about a mile north of the river.
