= Weatherby, Missouri =

- Village
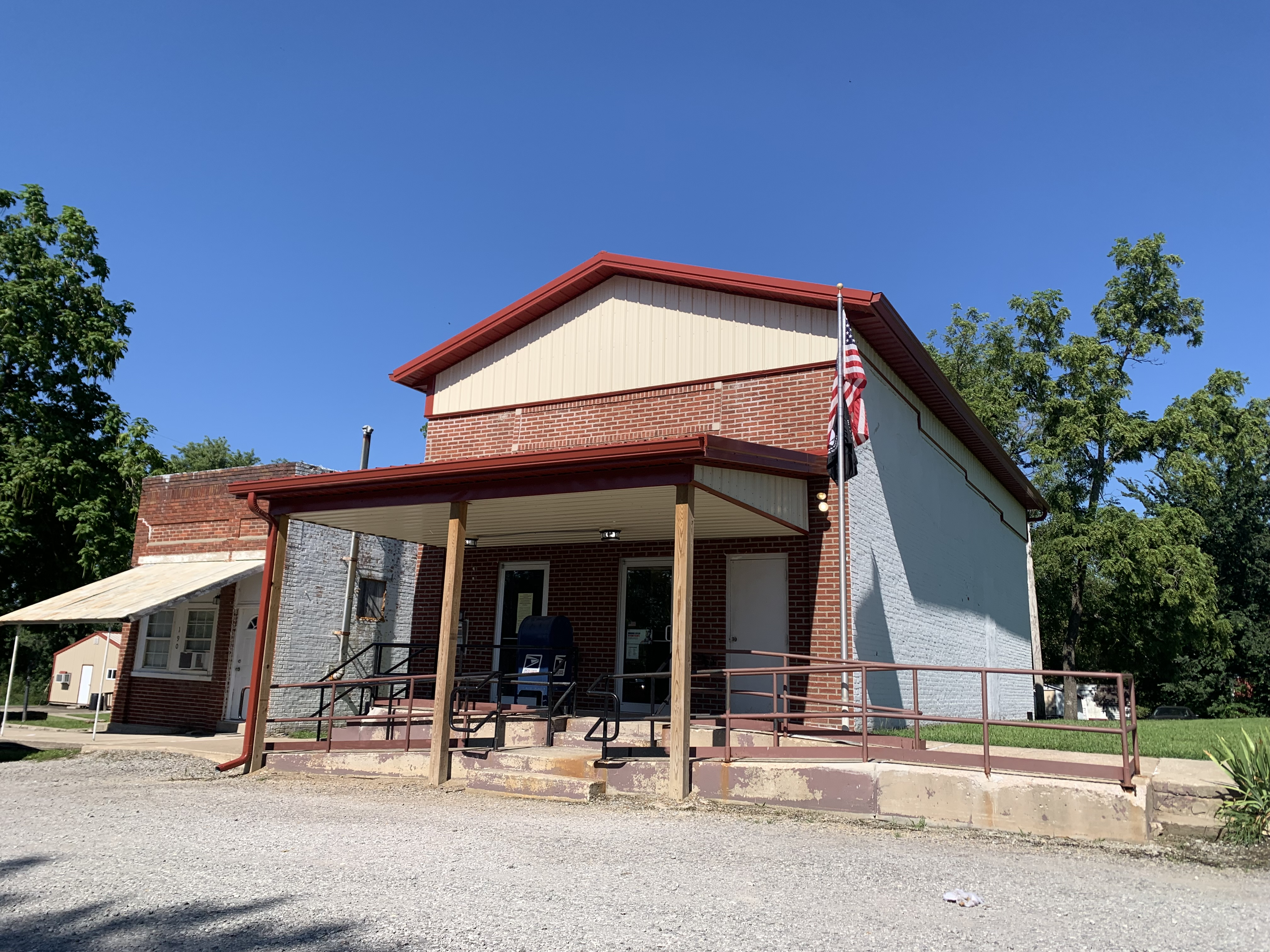
- Post Office in Weatherby

- Location of Weatherby, Missouri
- Coordinates: 39°54′33″N 94°14′31″W
- Country: United States
- State: Missouri
- County: DeKalb

Area
  - Total: 0.12 sq mi (0.31 km^{2})
  - Land: 0.12 sq mi (0.31 km^{2})
  - Water: 0 sq mi (0.00 km^{2})
- Elevation: 879 ft (268 m)

Population (2020)
  - Total: 80
  - Density: 677.0/sq mi (261.41/km^{2})
- Time zone: UTC-6 (Central (CST))
  - Summer (DST): UTC-5 (CDT)
- ZIP code: 64497
- Area code: 816
- FIPS code: 29-78028
- GNIS feature ID: 2397728

Weatherby is a village in eastern DeKalb County, Missouri, United States. The population was 80 at the 2020 census. It is part of the St. Joseph, MO–KS Metropolitan Statistical Area.

== History ==
Weatherby was laid out in 1885 by L. H. Weatherby, and named for him. A post office called Weatherby has been in operation since 1886.

The Absolom Riggs House was listed on the National Register of Historic Places in 1982.

== Geography ==
Weatherby is located on Missouri Route 6 six miles east of Maysville and two miles west of the Dekalb-Daviess county line. Grindstone Creek flows past one mile southeast of the community.

According to the United States Census Bureau, the village has a total area of 0.12 square miles (0.31 km^{2}), all land.

== Demographics ==
Historical population
Census	Pop.	Note	%±
1890	134		—
1900	228		70.1%
1910	171		−25.0%
1920	220		28.7%
1930	177		−19.5%
1940	208		17.5%
1950	156		−25.0%
1960	450		188.5%
1970	91		−79.8%
1980	121		33.0%
1990	91		−24.8%
2000	123		35.2%
2010	107		−13.0%
2020	80		−25.2%
U.S. Decennial Census

=== 2010 census ===
As of the census of 2010, there were 107 people, 41 households, and 28 families residing in the village. The population density was 891.7 inhabitants per square mile (344.3/km^{2}). There were 58 housing units at an average density of 483.3 per square mile (186.6/km^{2}). The racial makeup of the village was 99.1% White and 0.9% Native American.

There were 41 households, of which 36.6% had children under the age of 18 living with them, 41.5% were married couples living together, 22.0% had a female householder with no husband present, 4.9% had a male householder with no wife present, and 31.7% were non-families. 22.0% of all households were made up of individuals, and 7.3% had someone living alone who was 65 years of age or older. The average household size was 2.61 and the average family size was 3.04.

The median age in the village was 33.6 years. 26.2% of residents were under the age of 18; 9.2% were between the ages of 18 and 24; 26.1% were from 25 to 44; 29.8% were from 45 to 64; and 8.4% were 65 years of age or older. The gender makeup of the village was 51.4% male and 48.6% female.

=== 2000 census ===
As of the census of 2000, there were 123 people, 52 households, and 33 families residing in the town. The population density was 1,027.2 inhabitants per square mile (396.6/km^{2}). There were 61 housing units at an average density of 509.4 per square mile (196.7/km^{2}). The racial makeup of the town was 99.19% White, and 0.81% from two or more races.

There were 52 households, out of which 26.9% had children under the age of 18 living with them, 51.9% were married couples living together, 11.5% had a female householder with no husband present, and 36.5% were non-families. 32.7% of all households were made up of individuals, and 13.5% had someone living alone who was 65 years of age or older. The average household size was 2.37 and the average family size was 3.09.

In the town the population was spread out, with 25.2% under the age of 18, 7.3% from 18 to 24, 21.1% from 25 to 44, 28.5% from 45 to 64, and 17.9% who were 65 years of age or older. The median age was 42 years. For every 100 females, there were 98.4 males. For every 100 females age 18 and over, there were 95.7 males.

The median income for a household in the town was $19,375, and the median income for a family was $20,625. Males had a median income of $22,083 versus $16,250 for females. The per capita income for the town was $9,475. There were 19.0% of families and 21.1% of the population living below the poverty line, including 21.7% of under eighteens and 30.0% of those over 64.

== Education ==
It is in the Maysville R-I School District.

== Religion ==
There are three monasteries -- Protection of the Virgin Mary Monastery, St. Xenia Sisterhood, and Holy Archangel Michael and All Angels Skete located at 28650 105th Street in Weatherby, Missouri. All three are under the jurisdiction of the Serbian Orthodox Church in North and South America.
