= Marion, North Dakota =

Marion
- City
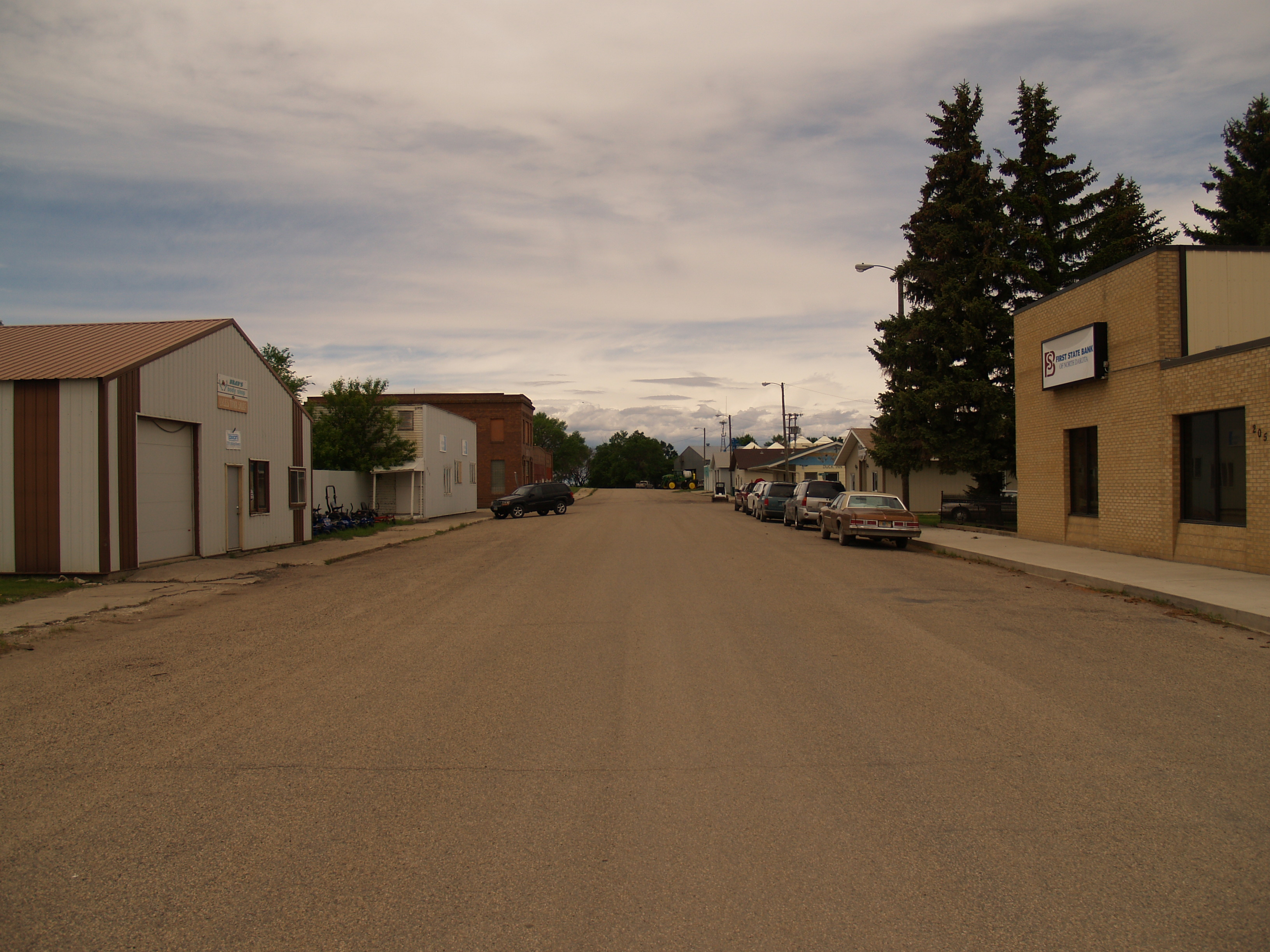
- Business District of Marion

- Location of Marion, North Dakota
- Coordinates: 46°36′26″N 98°20′1″W
- Country: United States
- State: North Dakota
- County: LaMoure
- Founded: 1900

Area
  - Total: 1.00 sq mi (2.60 km^{2})
  - Land: 0.84 sq mi (2.17 km^{2})
  - Water: 0.17 sq mi (0.43 km^{2})
- Elevation: 1,463 ft (446 m)

Population (2020)
  - Total: 125
  - Estimate (2022): 124
  - Density: 149.2/sq mi (57.61/km^{2})
- Time zone: UTC–6 (Central (CST))
  - Summer (DST): UTC–5 (CDT)
- ZIP code: 58466
- Area code: 701
- FIPS code: 38-50780
- GNIS feature ID: 1033654

Marion is a city in LaMoure County, North Dakota, United States. The population was 125 at the 2020 census.

== History ==
The city was founded in 1900 as Elmo, but changed its name to Marion in 1902. The new name came from Marion Mellen, daughter of Northern Pacific Railway president Charles Sanger Mellen. Marion was located at the end of a Northern Pacific branch line starting in Casselton and known as the "lady line" due to the many cities bearing female names located alongside the tracks. The line was in place in Marion until 2002, when eventual owner Red River Valley & Western filed for abandonment.

== Geography ==
Marion is located at 46°36′26″N 98°20′1″W (46.607360, -98.333510).

According to the United States Census Bureau, the city has a total area of 1.01 square miles (2.62 km^{2}), of which 0.84 square miles (2.18 km^{2}) is land and 0.17 square miles (0.44 km^{2}) is water.

== Demographics ==
Historical population
Census	Pop.	Note	%±
1910	241		—
1920	294		22.0%
1930	258		−12.2%
1940	242		−6.2%
1950	272		12.4%
1960	309		13.6%
1970	215		−30.4%
1980	214		−0.5%
1990	169		−21.0%
2000	146		−13.6%
2010	133		−8.9%
2020	125		−6.0%
2022 (est.)	124		−0.8%
U.S. Decennial Census; 2020 Census

=== 2010 census ===
As of the census of 2010, there were 133 people, 64 households, and 36 families residing in the city. The population density was 158.3 inhabitants per square mile (61.1/km^{2}). There were 81 housing units at an average density of 96.4 per square mile (37.2/km^{2}). The racial makeup of the city was 98.5% White and 1.5% from two or more races.

There were 64 households, of which 18.8% had children under the age of 18 living with them, 46.9% were married couples living together, 7.8% had a female householder with no husband present, 1.6% had a male householder with no wife present, and 43.8% were non-families. 37.5% of all households were made up of individuals, and 20.3% had someone living alone who was 65 years of age or older. The average household size was 2.08 and the average family size was 2.69.

The median age in the city was 50.3 years. 15% of residents were under the age of 18; 10.7% were between the ages of 18 and 24; 18.1% were from 25 to 44; 27.1% were from 45 to 64; and 29.3% were 65 years of age or older. The gender makeup of the city was 51.1% male and 48.9% female.

=== 2000 census ===
As of the census of 2000, there were 146 people, 71 households, and 40 families residing in the city. The population density was 174.4 inhabitants per square mile (67.3/km^{2}). There were 86 housing units at an average density of 102.8 per square mile (39.7/km^{2}). The racial makeup of the city was 98.63% White, 0.68% Asian, and 0.68% from two or more races.

There were 71 households, out of which 21.1% had children under the age of 18 living with them, 49.3% were married couples living together, 5.6% had a female householder with no husband present, and 16.2% were non-families. 40.8% of all households were made up of individuals, and 22.5% had someone living alone who was 65 years of age or older. The average household size was 2.06 and the average family size was 2.80.

In the city, the population was spread out, with 20.5% under the age of 18, 4.8% from 18 to 24, 19.9% from 25 to 44, 26.0% from 45 to 64, and 28.8% who were 65 years of age or older. The median age was 49 years. For every 100 females, there were 97.3 males. For every 100 females age 18 and over, there were 96.6 males.

The median income for a household in the city was $21,250, and the median income for a family was $24,583. Males had a median income of $39,000 versus $34,000 for females. The per capita income for the city was $31,041. There were 10.4% of families and 22.8% of the population living below the poverty line, including 25.6% of under eighteens and 27.9% of those over 64.

== Education ==
It is in the Litchville-Marion School District. The district was formed in 2002.

== In passing ==
Marion was mentioned on the March 5, 2014 episode of "Wheel of Fortune". A former resident, Stephanie Limesand, appeared on the show.
