= Barnard, South Dakota =

Barnard
- Unincorporated community
- Location within the state of South Dakota Barnard (the United States)
- Coordinates: 45°43′57″N 98°29′47″W
- Country: United States
- State: South Dakota
- County: Brown

Area
  - Total: 7.0000 sq mi (18.1299 km^{2})
- Elevation: 1,391 ft (424 m)

Population (2000)
  - Total: 36
  - Density: 5.1/sq mi (2.0/km^{2})
- Time zone: UTC-6 (Central (CST))
  - Summer (DST): UTC-5 (CDT)
- ZIP codes: 57426
- Area code: 605
- GNIS feature ID: 1253773

Barnard is an unincorporated community in Brown County, South Dakota, United States.

== History ==
Barnard was laid out in 1906, and named for a local resident. A post office was established at Barnard in 1910.

== Demographics ==
The population in Barnard is 36. There are 5 people per square mile. The median age in Barnard is 57.3. The number of people per household in Barnard is 2.1.
