= List of disasters in the United States by death toll =

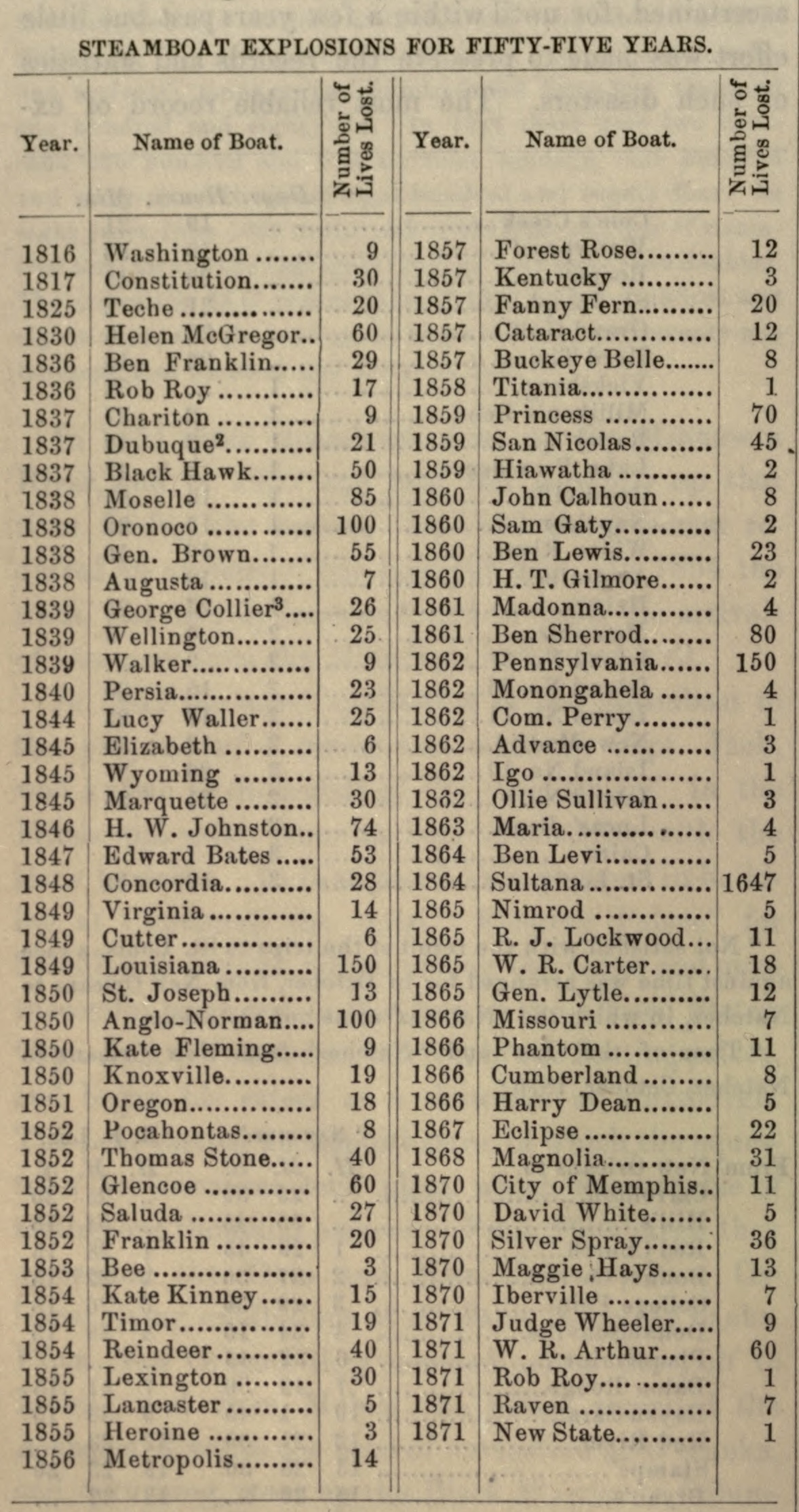
Steamboat boiler explosions were a common cause of 19th-century mass-casualty events in the United States.

Beginning in the 1890s, mass-casualty coal-mining accidents were frequent

This list of United States disasters by death toll includes disasters that occurred either in the United States, at diplomatic missions of the United States, or incidents outside of the United States in which a number of U.S. citizens were killed.

- Domestic deaths due to war in America are included except the American Civil War. For stats on this and U.S. military deaths in foreign locations, see United States military casualties of war and list of battles with most United States military fatalities.
- Due to inflation, the monetary damage estimates are not comparable. Unless otherwise noted, the year given is the year in which the currency's valuation was calculated.

== Over 1,000,000 deaths ==
Fatalities	Year	Article	Type	Location	Damage (US$)	Comments
1,131,819	2020–2023	COVID-19 pandemic in the United States	Pandemic	Nationwide	see Economic impact of the COVID-19 pandemic in the United States	Fatalities estimated. Deadliest known disaster in United States history.

== Over 100,000 deaths ==
Fatalities	Year	Article	Type	Location	Damage (US$)	Comments
725,000+	since 1999	Opioid epidemic in the United States	Drug Epidemic	Nationwide		Second-deadliest disaster in United States history. Deadliest drug epidemic in United States history.
700,000	since 1981	HIV/AIDS in the United States	Pandemic	Nationwide		Fatalities estimated. Third-deadliest disaster in United States history.
675,000	1918 – 1920	1918 influenza pandemic	Pandemic	Nationwide		Fatalities estimated. Fourth-deadliest disaster in United States history.
116,000	1957 – 1958	1957–1958 influenza pandemic	Pandemic	Nationwide		Fatalities estimated. Fifth-deadliest disaster in United States history.
100,000	1968	1968 influenza pandemic	Pandemic	Nationwide		Fatalities estimated. Sixth-deadliest disaster in United States history.

== Over 400 deaths ==
Fatalities	Year	Article	Type	Location	Damage (US$)	Comments
8,542+	1919–1930	1919–1930 encephalitis lethargica epidemic	Epidemic	United States		This statistic comes from recorded deaths 1919–1925. If the epidemic increased by its usual rate of 500–1,000 per year until 1927 the death toll could be over 10,500.
6,000–12,000	1900	1900 Galveston hurricane	Tropical cyclone	Texas	$34,000,000 (1900)	The deadliest natural disaster in United States history.
5,000	1936	1936 North American heat wave	Heat wave	United States, Canada		
4,000+	1862	Great Flood of 1862	Flood	Western United States	$100,000,000 (1862)	
3,389	1899	1899 San Ciriaco hurricane	Tropical cyclone	Puerto Rico, East Coast of the United States	$20,000,000 (1899)	
3,000+	1906	1906 San Francisco earthquake	Earthquake and fire (urban conflagration)	San Francisco, California	$235,000,000 (1906)	Conflagration followed quake; fatalities estimated; also major casualties in Santa Rosa and San Jose. Deadliest earthquake in U.S. history.
2,996 (2,977 ex. perps)	2001	September 11 attacks	Terrorism	New York City, Arlington County, Virginia, and Stonycreek Township near Shanksville, Pennsylvania	$10,000,000,000 (2001)	2,977 victims and 19 hijackers. Deadliest disaster in New York City and the Washington, D.C. metropolitan area.
2,982 (estimated)	2017	Hurricane Maria	Tropical cyclone	Puerto Rico, United States Virgin Islands, East Coast of the United States	$94,500,000,000 (2017)	Total includes at least 2,975 deaths based on a study by GWU on the estimated excess mortality. The official death count was previously 64. The storm caused $90 billion (2017 USD) in damage in Puerto Rico, and three deaths in the U.S. Virgin Islands, plus 75 deaths and $1.6 billion in damage across the rest of the Caribbean.
2,823	1928	1928 Okeechobee hurricane	Tropical cyclone	Florida, Puerto Rico	$800,000,000 (2005)	4,000+ believed dead total. Includes 2,511+ in the contiguous United States, 312 in Puerto Rico.
2,467	1941	Attack on Pearl Harbor	Military strike – bombing	Honolulu, Territory of Hawaii and nearby military installations		2,403 U.S. victims and 64 Japanese attackers. Deadliest attack on U.S. soil by a foreign government.
2,209	1889	Johnstown Flood	Accident – dam failure	Pennsylvania		Much rain, deforestation; dam failed
2,000	1893	1893 Cheniere Caminada hurricane	Tropical cyclone	Louisiana		Fatalities estimated
1,700	1980	1980 United States heat wave	Heat wave	Central and southern states	$20,000,000,000 (1980 USD)	Official death toll, may have been higher
1,547-1,864	1865	Sultana	Accident – shipwreck	Marion, Arkansas		Steamboat sank due to boiler explosion; fatalities estimated. Deadliest maritime disaster in U.S. history
1,500–2,500	1871	Peshtigo Fire	Wildfire	Peshtigo, Wisconsin, Upper Peninsula of Michigan		Fatalities estimated; most deaths in one fire in U.S. history
1,500	1896	1896 Eastern North America heat wave	Heat wave	Northeastern United States, Midwestern United States		Fatalities estimated
1,392	2005	Hurricane Katrina	Tropical cyclone	Florida, Louisiana, Mississippi, Alabama, Georgia, Kentucky, and Ohio	$125,000,000,000 (2005)	Tied with Hurricane Harvey as the costliest natural disaster in U.S. history.
1,173	1943	HMT Rohna	Military strike – bombing	Mediterranean Sea		Luftwaffe glide bomb hit troopship causing the largest loss of U.S. soldiers (1,050) at sea due to enemy action in a single incident.
1,021	1904	PS General Slocum	Accident – shipwreck	East River near New York City		Steamship sank due to fire on board. Deadliest maritime disaster in New York City, and deadliest disaster in city's history until 2001.
1,000–2,000	1893	1893 Sea Islands hurricane	Tropical cyclone	Georgia, South Carolina		Fatalities estimated
1,000	1918	1918 Cloquet fire	Wildfire (rural)	Minnesota	$7,300,000	
918	1978	Jonestown	Mass murder	Jonestown, Guyana		Jim Jones, cult leader of the Peoples Temple Agricultural Project, convinced most of the group to drink grape Flavor Aid poisoned with cyanide or to inject themselves and their children with cyanide, totaling 909 deaths of U.S. nationals. A family of four other Temple members committed murder/suicide by knife in Georgetown. Five others were shot and killed while trying to escape from Jonestown, including U.S. Congressman Leo Ryan.
879	1945	USS Indianapolis	Military strike – submarine	Philippine Sea		Largest loss of life in the history of the U.S. Navy at sea
844	1915	SS Eastland	Accident – shipwreck	Chicago, Illinois		Passenger ship capsized in Chicago harbor while loading charter for company picnic, causing great loss of life despite shallow water and proximity to land. Deadliest disaster in the history of Great Lakes shipping, and deadliest disaster in Chicago history.
819	1944	SS Léopoldville	Military strike – submarine	English Channel		Approximately 763 United States Army soldiers drowned.
800	1875	1875 Indianola hurricane	Tropical cyclone	Louisiana, Texas		Fatalities estimated
749	1944	Exercise Tiger	Military strike – E-boats	English Channel		USS LST-289, LST-507 and LST-531 sunk during a training exercise.
747	1925	Tornado outbreak of March 18, 1925	Tornado outbreak	Missouri, Illinois, Indiana, Kentucky, Tennessee	$1,650,000,000 (2005)	At least 12 tornadoes, including the following: 1925 tri-state tornado: 695 deaths (deadliest tornado in U.S. history); Buck Lodge, Tennessee/Beaumont, Kentucky: 41 deaths
745	1919	1919 Florida Keys hurricane	Tropical cyclone	Florida, Texas		Including 488 deaths aboard SS Valbanera
739	1995	Chicago Heat Wave of 1995	Heat wave	Chicago, Illinois		
683	1942	USS Juneau	Military strike – submarine	Guadalcanal		Sunk by submarine while retreating with damage from naval battle of Guadalcanal.
682–800	1938	1938 New England hurricane	Tropical cyclone			
675	1943	SS Dorchester	Military strike – submarine	Greenland		United States troopship.
650	1913	Great Flood of 1913	Flood	Central United States, Eastern United States		Fatalities estimated
644	1943	USS Liscombe Bay	Military strike – submarine	Gilbert Islands		Submarine torpedo detonated the aircraft carrier's bomb magazine during Operation Galvanic.
602	1903	Iroquois Theatre fire	Fire (building)	Chicago, Illinois		Worst theater fire in American history; worst single-building fire.
600	1928	St. Francis Dam	Accident – dam failure	Santa Clarita, California		
581	1947	Texas City disaster	Accident – explosion	Texas City, Texas		Ammonium nitrate on board ship
501+	1896	Tornado outbreak sequence of May 1896	Tornado outbreak sequence	Central United States, Southern United States	$2,900,000,000 (1997)	At least 38 tornadoes, including the following: 1896 St. Louis–East St. Louis tornado: 255–400 deaths; Sherman, Texas: 73+ deaths; Ortonville–Thomas–Oakwood, Michigan: 47+ deaths; Seneca–Oneida, Kansas/Falls City, Nebraska: 25+ deaths; Imbs–Germantown, Illinois: 24 deaths
500+	1804	1804 Antigua–Charleston hurricane	Tropical cyclone	Southeastern United States		
500	1865	American steamship General Lyon (1864)	Accident – fire, shipwreck	Off Cape Hatteras, North Carolina		Fatalities estimated
500	1871	Great Michigan Fire	Wildfire (rural)	Michigan		Fatalities estimated
492	1942	Cocoanut Grove fire	Fire (building)	Boston, Massachusetts		Deadliest nightclub fire ever, and second-deadliest structure fire in U.S. history; loss of life due to blocked exits; burn victims were among the first treated with penicillin
476–1,000+	1927	Hawks Nest Tunnel disaster	Industrial, silicosis	Gauley Bridge, West Virginia		178 admitted deaths, 476 with congressional inquiry, 1,000+ by epidemiologists.
454+	1936	1936 Tupelo–Gainesville tornado outbreak	Tornado outbreak	Alabama, Arkansas, Mississippi, Georgia, South Carolina, Tennessee		At least 12 tornadoes, including the following: Tupelo, Mississippi: 216+ deaths; Gainesville, Georgia: 203+ deaths
450–800	1862	Dakota War of 1862	Massacre			
428	1913	1913 (Ohio) statewide flood	Flood	Ohio		
418+	1894	Great Hinckley Fire	Wildfire (rural)	Hinckley, Minnesota and vicinity		
416	1957	Hurricane Audrey	Tropical cyclone	Louisiana, Texas, Mississippi, Alabama	$147,000,000 (1957)	
408	1935	1935 Labor Day hurricane	Tropical cyclone	Florida		

== 201 to 400 deaths ==
Fatalities	Year	Article	Type	Location	Damage (US$)	Comments
400	1857	SS Central America	Accident – shipwreck	Off the coast of Georgia		Fatalities estimated
400	1860	PS Lady Elgin	Accident – shipwreck	Chicago, Illinois		
400	1888	Great Blizzard of 1888	Blizzard	Northeastern United States		Fatalities estimated
400+	1898	Portland Gale	Storm	New England		
385	1937	Ohio River flood of 1937	Flood	Ohio, Kentucky, Indiana, Illinois	$5,000,000,000	
383+	1917	May–June 1917 tornado outbreak sequence	Tornado outbreak sequence	Midwestern United States, Southeastern United States	$6,880,000	At least 66 tornadoes, including the following: Mattoon–Charleston, Illinois: 101+ deaths; Tiptonville, Tennessee/Dublin, Kentucky: 67 deaths; Sumiton–Morris, Alabama: 27 deaths; Cheney–Florence, Kansas: 23 deaths; Blytheville, Arkansas/Como, Tennessee: 18 deaths; Ellsinore–Drum, Missouri: 18 deaths
383	1950	Great Appalachian Storm of November 1950	Blizzard	Eastern United States	$66,700,000 (1950)	
380+	1911	1911 Eastern North America heat wave	Heat wave	Northeastern United States		
372	1926	1926 Miami hurricane	Tropical cyclone	Florida		
372	1944	USS Mount Hood	Accident – explosion	New Guinea		Ammunition ship explosion.
371+	1909	1909 Grand Isle hurricane	Tropical cyclone	Gulf Coast of the United States		
362	1907	Monongah mining disaster	Accident – coal mine	Monongah, West Virginia		
361	1913	Great Dayton Flood	Flood	Dayton, Ohio		Flood was created by a series of three winter storms that hit the region in March 1913
348	2011	2011 Super Outbreak	Tornado outbreak	Midwestern United States, Southern United States, Eastern United States	~$11,000,000,000 (2011)	Including 24 non-tornadic deaths; 367 tornadoes, including the following: Hackleburg–Phil Campbell, Alabama: 72 deaths; Tuscaloosa–Birmingham, Alabama: 64 deaths; Rainsville, Alabama: 25 deaths; Smithville, Mississippi: 23 deaths; Shoal Creek Valley–Ohatchee–Piedmont, Alabama/Cave Spring, Georgia: 22 deaths; Ringgold, Georgia/Southeast Tennessee: 20 deaths
330+	1932	1932 Deep South tornado outbreak	Tornado outbreak	Southern United States	$4,340,000	At least 36 tornadoes, including 10 violent (F4 or F5) storms, resulting in 268 deaths in Alabama alone. Deadliest tornadoes include the following: Cox–Union Grove, Alabama: 49+ deaths; Gantts Quarry–Chandler Springs, Alabama: 41 deaths; Jackson County, Alabama/Jasper, Tennessee: 38+ deaths; Ralph–Northport, Alabama: 37 deaths; Plantersville–Sylacauga, Alabama: 31 deaths; Cullman–Arab, Alabama: 18 deaths; Dalton, Georgia/Conasauga, Tennessee: 15 deaths
326+	1900	1900 Hoboken Docks fire	Fire (industrial)	Hoboken, New Jersey		Including 99 deaths on SS Saale
324+	1908	1908 Dixie tornado outbreak	Tornado outbreak	Great Plains, Midwestern United States, Southern United States		At least 29 tornadoes, including the following: Amite, Louisiana/Purvis, Mississippi: 143 deaths; Concordia Parish, Louisiana/near Natchez, Mississippi: 91 deaths; Bergens/Albertville, Alabama: 35 deaths
322	1930	Ohio Penitentiary	Fire (building)	Columbus, Ohio		
320	1944	Port Chicago disaster	Accident – explosion	Port Chicago, California		World War II ammunition ignited
317+	1840	Great Natchez Tornado	Tornado	Natchez, Mississippi	$1,260,000	
313	1837	Steamboat Monmouth disaster	Boat collision	Above Baton Rouge on the Mississippi River		Fatalities estimated
310	1974	1974 Super Outbreak	Tornado outbreak	Ontario, Illinois, Indiana, Michigan, Ohio, Kentucky, Tennessee, Alabama, Mississippi, Georgia, North Carolina, Virginia, West Virginia and New York	$3,500,000,000 (2005)	Additional 9 deaths in Ontario; 148 tornadoes, including the following: Xenia, Ohio: 32 deaths; Brandenburg, Kentucky: 31 deaths; Tanner, Alabama (1st): 28 deaths; Guin, Alabama: 28 deaths; Otterbein–Monticello–Wolcottville, Indiana: 18 deaths; Tanner, Alabama (2nd): 16 deaths
300+	1856	1856 Last Island hurricane	Tropical cyclone	Louisiana, Mississippi		
300	1864	Oak Run Massacre	Massacre	Oak Run, California		
300	1865	Mobile magazine explosion	Accident – explosion	Mobile, Alabama		Civil War ammunition; fatalities estimated
300	1921	Tulsa race massacre	Race massacre	Tulsa, Oklahoma		White mob attacks affluent black neighborhood; fatalities estimated
296–319	1937	New London School explosion	Accident – explosion	New London, Texas	$13,000,000 (2003)	Gas leak
300–400	1944	1944 Great Atlantic hurricane	Tropical cyclone	East Coast of the United States		Fatalities estimated
288	1865	Sinking of the Kentucky (steamboat)	Accident – shipwreck	Red River, Mississippi (near Eagle Bend)		The heavily overloaded Kentucky struck a sunken log and quickly sank. Of more than 800–1,000 passengers and crew on board (mostly paroled Confederate prisoners and their families), 288 perished. Many of the dead were children. The Kentucky had previously experienced a boiler explosion in 1861, in which 22 people died.
286	1960	December 1960 nor'easter	Blizzard	Northeastern United States		
283+	1859	Mendocino War	Massacre	Mendocino County, California		
282	1881	Thumb Fire	Wildfire (rural)	Michigan	$2,347,000	
278	1876	Brooklyn Theatre fire	Fire (building)	Brooklyn, New York		
276–702	2021	February 13–17, 2021 North American winter storm	Blizzard	United States	$20,400,000,000	Additional 14 deaths in Mexico
275	1915	1915 Galveston hurricane	Tropical cyclone	Texas		
275	1915	1915 New Orleans hurricane	Tropical cyclone	Louisiana		
274	1898	USS Maine	Explosion	Havana, Cuba		A major event that precipitated the Spanish–American War. Exact cause remains unknown.
273	1875	Pacific (1850)	Accident – shipwreck	Off Cape Flattery, Washington		Fatalities estimated
273	1979	American Airlines Flight 191	Accident – aircraft	Chicago, Illinois		Deadliest aircraft accident in U.S. history
272	1943	Henry R. Mallory	Military strike – submarine	North Atlantic		United States troopship.
271	1965	Palm Sunday tornado outbreak	Tornado outbreak	Iowa, Ohio, Michigan, Indiana		78 tornadoes, including the following: Coldwater Lake–Southern Hillsdale–Manitou Beach–Devils Lake–Southern Tecumseh, Michigan: 44 deaths from two tornadoes; Southern Elkhart–Dunlap, Indiana: 36 deaths; Wakarusa–Northern Goshen–Midway–Middlebury, Indiana: 31 deaths; Crawfordsville–Southern Arcadia, Indiana: 28 deaths; Toledo, Ohio/Lost Peninsula, Michigan: 18 deaths; Pittsfield–Grafton–Strongsville, Ohio: 18 deaths; Russiaville–Alto–Southern Kokomo–Greentown, Indiana: 17 deaths
270	1988	Pan Am Flight 103	Terrorism	Lockerbie, Scotland		Inflight bombing of a flight from London to New York killed all aboard, including 179 U.S. citizens, and 16 on the ground.
265	1913	Dawson, New Mexico	Accident – coal mine	Dawson, New Mexico		Including 263 miners and two rescuers
265	2001	American Airlines Flight 587	Accident – aircraft	Queens, New York		Second-deadliest U.S. aviation accident, and deadliest in New York City.
259	1909	Cherry Mine disaster	Accident – coal mine	Cherry, Illinois		
257	1932	1932 San Ciprián hurricane	Tropical cyclone	Puerto Rico		
256	1969	Hurricane Camille	Tropical cyclone	Mississippi, Alabama, and Virginia		
256	1985	Arrow Air Flight 1285	Accident – aircraft	Gander, Newfoundland and Labrador, Canada		Most of the passengers were members of the 101st Airborne Division.
252	2024	Hurricane Helene	Tropical cyclone	Southeastern United States		
250	1858	Pennsylvania (steamboat)	Accident – shipwreck	Mississippi River, near Memphis, Tennessee		Fatalities estimated
250	1913	Great Lakes Storm of 1913	Blizzard	Great Lakes region	$5,000,000 (1913)	Fatalities estimated
247	1903	Heppner flood of 1903	Flood	Heppner, Oregon		
247	1953	Flint–Worcester tornado outbreak sequence	Tornado outbreak sequence	Michigan, Ohio, Nebraska and Massachusetts		50 tornadoes, including the following: Northern Flint–Beecher, Michigan: 116 deaths; Worcester, Massachusetts: 94 deaths; Deshler–Fremont–Fairview Lanes–Northeastern Elyria–Western Cleveland, Ohio: 17 deaths
246-280	1863	Bear River Massacre	Massacre	Near Preston, Idaho		
246	1927	Great Mississippi Flood of 1927	Flood	Arkansas, Illinois, Kentucky, Louisiana, Mississippi, and Tennessee	$400,000,000	
243+	1920	April 1920 tornado outbreak	Tornado outbreak	Southern United States		At least 17 tornadoes, including the following: Aberdeen, Mississippi/Waco, Alabama: 88 deaths; Bay Springs–Russell, Mississippi: 36 deaths; Deemer, Mississippi: 27 deaths; Lily Flagg–Brownsboro, Alabama: 27 deaths; Ingomar–Glen, Mississippi: 24 deaths; Carbon Hill–Lacey's Spring, Alabama: 21 deaths
241–289	1850	SS G. P. Griffith	Accident – shipwreck	Lake Erie		
241	1983	1983 Beirut barracks bombings	Terrorism	Beirut, Lebanon		58 French peacekeepers, six civilians and two suicide bombers also died in the attack
240	1862	Tonkawa Massacre	Massacre	Indian Territory		
239	1907	Darr Mine disaster	Accident – coal mine	Rostraver Township, Pennsylvania		
238	1912	RMS Titanic	Accident – shipwreck	north Atlantic Ocean, south of Newfoundland		Only includes U.S. victims
238	1972	1972 Black Hills flood	Flood	Rapid City, South Dakota	$160,000,000 (1972) $664,000,000 (2002)	Average rainfall over area of 60 mi^{2} measured at 10-15 inches (380 mm), over 6 hours in middle of night June 9–10, 1972.
235	1888	Schoolhouse Blizzard	Winter storm	Midwestern United States		
230	1996	TWA Flight 800	Accident – aircraft	Long Island, New York		
229	1997	Korean Air Flight 801	Accident – aircraft	Asan-Maina, Guam		
229–600	2021	2021 Western North America heat wave	Heat wave	Pacific Northwest		At least 116 deaths in Oregon, at least 112 in Washington, and one in Idaho
225	1865	Brother Jonathan (steamer)	Accident – shipwreck	Off Crescent City, California		Fatalities estimated
225–350	1890	Wounded Knee Massacre	Massacre	Oglala Lakota County, South Dakota		200–325 estimated Lakota fatalities, 25 U.S. Army
225	2006	2006 North American heat wave	Heat wave	Contiguous United States		
223	1998	1998 United States embassy bombings	Terrorism	Tanzania, Kenya		4,000+ injured
217+	1927	Tornado outbreak of May 1927	Tornado outbreak	Midwestern United States, Southern United States		At least 34 tornadoes, including the following: Imboden, Arkansas/Poplar Bluff, Missouri: 98 deaths; Strong, Arkansas: 24 deaths; Nevada, Texas: 19 deaths; Garland, Texas: 15 deaths
217	1999	EgyptAir Flight 990	Accident – aircraft	Atlantic Ocean near Nantucket, Massachusetts		
216	1902	Fraterville Mine disaster	Accident – coal mine	Fraterville, Tennessee		
215	1921	1921 San Antonio floods	Cyclone-related flood	Rio Grande Valley		
211	1906	1906 Florida Keys hurricane	Tropical cyclone	Florida		
209	1940	Rhythm Club fire	Fire (building)	Natchez, Mississippi		
209	1952	Tornado outbreak of March 21–22, 1952	Tornado outbreak	Southern United States	$285,300,000 (2019)	31 tornadoes, including the following: Kensett–Judsonia–Russell, Arkansas: 50 deaths; Bolivar–Henderson–Chesterfield, Tennessee: 38 deaths; Cotton Plant–Hunter, Arkansas: 29 deaths; Cooter–Cottonwood Point, Missouri: 17 deaths; Byhalia–Cayce, Mississippi/Williston, Tennessee: 16 deaths
208	1993	1993 Storm of the Century	Cyclonic blizzard	Eastern United States	$6,650,000,000 (2008)	Additional 110 deaths in other countries
202	1896	1896 Cedar Keys hurricane	Tropical cyclone	Landfall at Cedar Key, Florida;	$9,600,000 in 1896 ($289,000,000 in 2018)	Heavy damage along much of Eastern Seaboard of U.S.
201	1966	North American blizzard of 1966	Blizzard	Eastern United States		

== 81 to 200 deaths ==
Fatalities	Year	Article	Type	Location	Damage (US$)	Comments
200–365	1854	Powhattan (1837)	Accident – shipwreck	Harvey Cedars, New Jersey		
200–300	1871	Great Chicago Fire	Fire (urban conflagration)	Chicago, Illinois		Fatalities estimated; 125 bodies recovered
200+	1900	Scofield Mine disaster	Accident – coal mine	Scofield, Utah		Fatalities estimated
195	1928	Mather Mine disaster	Accident – coal mine	Mather, Pennsylvania		
192	1898	The Portland	Accident – shipwreck	Gloucester, Massachusetts		
192	1913	Tornado outbreak sequence of March 1913	Tornado outbreak	Central United States	$3,000,000	At least 19 tornadoes, including the following: Omaha, Nebraska: 103 deaths; Bellevue, Nebraska/Harlan, Iowa: 25 deaths; Mead, Nebraska/Logan, Iowa: 22 deaths; Prairieton–Terre Haute, Indiana: 21 deaths; Douglas, Nebraska/Macedonia, Iowa: 18 deaths
190–250	1847	SS Phoenix (1845)	Accident – shipwreck	Lake Michigan		
187+	1890	March 1890 middle Mississippi Valley tornado outbreak	Tornado outbreak	Middle Mississippi Valley		At least 24 tornadoes, including the following: Shively, Kentucky/Jeffersonville, Indiana: 115 deaths; Kevil–West Louisville, Kentucky: 21+ deaths
187	1996	North American blizzard of 1996	Winter storm, flood	Eastern United States		Including 33 deaths due to flooding
186	2011	Tornado outbreak sequence of May 21–26, 2011	Tornado outbreak sequence	Midwestern United States, Southern United States	$7,000,000,000 (2011)	Including the Joplin, Missouri tornado, which caused 158 direct and 8 indirect deaths, the latter of which are included here.
185–200	1863	Lawrence Massacre	mass murder, military operation	Lawrence, Kansas		
184+	1955	Hurricane Diane	Tropical cyclone	East Coast of the United States		
181	1785	Faithful Steward (ship)	Accident – shipwreck	Off Cape Henlopen, Delaware Bay		
181	1904	Harwick Mine disaster	Accident – coal mine	Cheswick, Pennsylvania		Fatalities estimated
181+	1909	Tornado outbreak of late-April 1909	Tornado outbreak	Midwestern United States, Southern United States		At least 43 tornadoes, including the following: Aspen Hill–Bee Spring–Mulberry, Tennessee: 31+ deaths; Horn Lake, Mississippi/Bolivar–Scotts Hill, Tennessee: 29+ deaths; Ship Bend–Clovercroft, Tennessee: 17+ deaths
181	1947	1947 Glazier–Higgins–Woodward tornadoes	Tornado outbreak	Oklahoma (especially Woodward), Texas (including Glazier and Higgins), Kansas		
180+	1914	Eccles mine disaster	Accident – coal mine	Eccles, West Virginia		
180	1985	1985 Puerto Rico floods	Flood	Puerto Rico		
179+	1898	1898 Georgia hurricane	Tropical cyclone	Florida, Georgia		
178+	1884	Tornado outbreak of February 19–20, 1884	Tornado outbreak	Southeastern United States		At least 37 tornadoes, including the following: Jacksonville, Alabama/Cave Spring, Georgia: 30 deaths; Pee Dee–Rockingham–Philadelphia–Manly, North Carolina: 23 deaths; Cartersville–Mount Oglethorpe, Georgia: 22 deaths
175-350 (?)	1919	Red Summer	Periods of mass unrest	Major cities across the United States including Washington, Chicago, and Omaha		The Washington race riot, the Chicago race riot, the Omaha race riot, Elaine massacre, and various other riots took place from April to November due to racial violence throughout the nation, mostly incited by white supremacists.
175	1837	Ben Sherrod	Fire (ship)	Near Natchez, Mississippi		
175	1864	Sand Creek Massacre	Mass racial violence	Colorado Territory		Cheyenne-Arapahoe fatalities estimated, U.S. Army/Colorado militia 25 killed
175	1908	Collinwood school fire	Fire (building)	Cleveland, Ohio		Deadliest school fire in U.S. history; led to many changes in how schools were built.
173-217	1870	Marias Massacre	Massacre	Montana Territory		
172	1924	Castle Gate Mine disaster	Accident – coal mine	Castle Gate, Utah		171 miners and one rescue worker
171	1908	Rhoads Opera House fire	Fire (building)	Boyertown, Pennsylvania		Sources conflict on number of fatalities: 170 or 171.
171	2026	January 23–27, 2026 North American winter storm	Winter storm	Central United States, Eastern United States		Three additional deaths occurred in Canada
169	1903	Hanna Mine disasters	Accident – coal mine	Carbon County, Wyoming		
169	1977	Beverly Hills Supper Club fire	Fire (building)	Southgate, Kentucky		169 people (including four unborn children) perished. Victims became trapped in exits.
168+	1880	Tornado outbreak of April 1880	Tornado outbreak	Midwestern United States		At least 20 tornadoes, including the following: Boaz–Evergreen, Missouri: 99 deaths; Rocky Comfort–Grovespring: 31 deaths
168	1917	Speculator Mine disaster	Fire (mine)	Butte, Montana		
168	1944	Hartford circus fire	Fire (building)	Hartford, Connecticut		
168	1966	1966 New York City smog	Smog incident	New York City and New York metropolitan area, including parts of New Jersey and Connecticut		Fatalities estimated
168–169	1995	Oklahoma City bombing	Terrorism	Oklahoma City, Oklahoma		Deadliest act of domestic terrorism, and deadliest domestic bombing, in U.S. history
165–173	1946	1946 Aleutian Islands earthquake	Earthquake, tsunami	Alaska, Hawaii		
163	1944	West Loch disaster	Accident - explosion	Pearl Harbor, Hawaii		Classified as top secret until 1960.
162	1956	March 18–20, 1956 nor'easter	Blizzard	Northeastern United States		
160	1838	Moselle (riverboat)	Accident – shipwreck	Ohio River, near Cincinnati		
158	2012	Hurricane Sandy	Tropical cyclone	Most of the United States East Coast	$71,400,000,000	86 indirect fatalities occurred in the United States. 76 additional fatalities occurred in six other countries and offshore; 21 people are still missing in Haiti.
157	1960	Hurricane Donna	Tropical cyclone	The Caribbean, United States East Coast	$491,100,000	Includes 107 deaths in Puerto Rico.
156-173	1873	Massacre Canyon	Massacre	Massacre Canyon, Nebraska		
156	1987	Northwest Airlines Flight 255	Accident – aircraft	Detroit, Michigan		
156+	2022	Hurricane Ian	Tropical cyclone	Florida, the Carolinas, Virginia		Including at least seven deaths in a migrant vessel off the coast of Florida which are counted in Monroe County's death toll; eleven others remain missing from that incident as of April 3, 2023
154	1940	1940 Armistice Day Blizzard	Winter storm, shipwrecks	Midwestern United States		Including 66 deaths in a series of shipwrecks in Lake Michigan, including the SS Anna C. Minch, the SS Novadoc, the SS William B. Davock, and others
154+	1944	1944 Appalachians tornado outbreak	Tornado outbreak	Midwestern United States, Mid-Atlantic States		At least seven tornadoes, including the following: Wyatt–Shinnston–Cheat Mountain, West Virginia: 100–103 deaths; Wellsburg, West Virginia/Oakland, Maryland: 30 deaths; Pittsburgh–Somerset, Pennsylvania: 17 deaths
153+	1920	1920 Palm Sunday tornado outbreak	Tornado outbreak	Midwestern United States, Southern United States		At least 37 tornadoes, including the following: LaGrange, Georgia: 27 deaths; Red Hill–Susanna–Red Ridge–Agricola, Alabama/West Point, Georgia: 26 deaths; Ossian–Townley, Indiana/Brunersburg–Raab Corners, Ohio: 23 deaths; Channahon–Troy Township–Lockport–Bellwood–Maywood–Melrose Park–Dunning, Illinois: 20 deaths; West Liberty–Geneva–Ceylon, Indiana/Van Wert, Ohio: 17 deaths
153	1982	Pan Am Flight 759	Accident – aircraft	New Orleans, Louisiana		
150–200	1849	Louisiana (steamboat)	Boiler explosion	New Orleans, Louisiana		Fatalities estimated
150–200	1936	1936 Northeast Flood	Flood	Northeastern United States		Fatalities estimated
150	1854	New Era (1854 ship)	Accident – shipwreck	Off Asbury Park, New Jersey		Fatalities estimated
149	1942	Tornado outbreak of March 16–17, 1942	Tornado outbreak	Central United States, Southern United States	$5,250,000	At least 28 tornadoes, including the following: Berclair–New Harmony, Mississippi: 63 deaths; Bethel Springs–Beacon, Tennessee: 15 deaths
146	1911	Triangle Shirtwaist Factory fire	Fire (building)	New York City, New York		Led to improved occupational safety standards as well as mandatory comprehensive fire safety standards
145	1945	Tornado outbreak of April 12, 1945	Tornado outbreak	Midwestern United States		Including 69 deaths from a tornado in Pushmataha County, Oklahoma, also including 17 indirect deaths
144	1871	Camp Grant Massacre	Massacre	Camp Grant, Arizona		
144	1953	1953 Waco tornado outbreak	Tornado outbreak	Great Plains, Midwestern United States		Including 114 deaths from an F5 tornado in Waco, Texas
144	1976	1976 Big Thompson River flood	Flood	Colorado		
144	1978	PSA Flight 182	Accident – aircraft	San Diego, California		
143+	1916	Tornado outbreak of June 5–6, 1916	Tornado outbreak	Southern United States		At least 35 tornadoes including the following: Barney–Heber Springs–Almond, Arkansas: 25+ deaths; Kensett–Judsonia–Bald Knob, Arkansas: 25 deaths
140	2000	2000 Southern United States heat wave	Heat wave	Southern United States		
139	1840	Lexington	Accident – shipwreck	Long Island Sound		Steamship sank due to fire on board
139	1874	Mill River (Northampton, Massachusetts)	Accident – dam failure	Hampshire County, Massachusetts		
139	1917	Eddystone explosion	Explosion	Eddystone, Pennsylvania		
138	1944	USS Turner (DD-648)	Accident – shipwreck	Lower New York Bay		
137	1934	SS Morro Castle (1930)	Accident – shipwreck	Off Long Beach Island, New Jersey		
137	1985	Delta Air Lines Flight 191	Accident – aircraft	Dallas, Texas		
137+	2025	July 2025 Central Texas floods	Flood	Central Texas (focused on Guadalupe River Watershed in Texas Hill Country)		Flash flood began overnight July 4 due to mesoscale convective vortex. 119 fatalities were in Kerr County, including 27+ campers and counselors of Camp Mystic.
134	1906	1906 Mississippi hurricane	Tropical cyclone	Southeastern United States		
134	1960	1960 New York mid-air collision	Accident – aircraft	New York City, New York		
134	1967	1967 USS Forrestal fire	Fire (ship)	Gulf of Tonkin, Vietnam	>$72,000,000	
132	1994	USAir Flight 427	Accident – aircraft	Pittsburgh, Pennsylvania		
130–300	1852	Atlantic (1848)	Accident – shipwreck	Lake Erie		
130	1944	Cleveland East Ohio Gas explosion	Accident – explosion	Cleveland, Ohio	$7,000,000- $15,000,000	
129	1963	USS Thresher (SSN-593)	Accident – submarine	Atlantic Ocean, off the coast of Massachusetts		Deadliest submarine disaster in U.S. history.
128	1838	Steamship Pulaski disaster	Accident – shipwreck	Off North Carolina		
128–135	1901	SS City of Rio de Janeiro	Accident – shipwreck	San Francisco Bay, California		
128	1911	Banner Mine disaster	Accident – coal mine	Alabama		
128	1915	Sinking of the RMS Lusitania	Military strike – submarine	Atlantic Ocean near Kinsale, Ireland		Ship torpedoed by a German U-boat. 1,198 fatalities resulted overall; 128 of them were Americans.
128	1933	Early-May 1933 tornado outbreak sequence	Tornado outbreak	Midwestern United States, Southeastern United States		At least 27 tornadoes, including the following: Tompkinsville–Russell Springs, Kentucky: 36 deaths; Livingston–Byrdstown, Tennessee: 35 deaths; Brent–Pelham, Alabama: 21 deaths; Anderson–Fountain Inn, South Carolina: 19 deaths
128	1956	1956 Grand Canyon mid-air collision	Accident – aircraft	Grand Canyon, Arizona		Parts of wreckage still visible. Deadliest air disaster in U.S. at that time; led to creation of Federal Aviation Administration two years later.
125	1972	Buffalo Creek flood	Accident – dam failure	Logan County, West Virginia		
123	1923	Dawson, New Mexico	Accident – coal mine	Dawson, New Mexico		
123	1929	Cleveland Clinic fire of 1929	Fire (building)	Cleveland, Ohio		Nitrate film combustion triggered the fire
123	1971	February 1971 Mississippi Delta tornado outbreak	Tornado outbreak	Southern United States, Ohio River Valley	$45,900,000 (1971)	19 tornadoes, including the following: Fitler–Cary–Swiftown–Morgan City–Quito–Oxberry–Oxford, Mississippi/Middleton, Tennessee: 58 deaths; Waverly, Louisiana/Mayersville–Delta City–Inverness–Moorehead, Mississippi: 47 deaths
122+	1883	Tornado outbreak of April 21–23, 1883	Tornado outbreak	Central and Southern United States		Including at least 56 deaths from the McCall Creek–Wesson–Beauregard–Georgetown, Mississippi tornado
121	1917	Hastings mine explosion	Accident – coal mine	Las Animas County, Colorado		
120	1857	Mountain Meadows Massacre	mass murder	Utah Territory		Mormon settlers executed between 120 and 140 men, women, and children from the Baker-Fancher party wagon train after accepting their surrender from a five-day siege and offering them safe passage through Utah Territory.
120	1933	Long Beach earthquake	Earthquake	Long Beach, California	$50,000,000 (1933)	
120	2005	Hurricane Rita	Tropical cyclone	Louisiana	$18,500,000,000 (2005)	Including 23 deaths from a bus fire during evacuations in Wilmer, Texas
119-120	1863	New York City draft riots	Riot	New York City, New York	$1–5 million (1863)	It was the worst civil unrest in modern U.S. history. Required diverting Union Army troops from the front to put down.
119	1924	Benwood mine disaster	Accident – coal mine	Benwood, West Virginia		
119	1946	Winecoff Hotel fire	Fire (building)	Atlanta, Georgia		Deadliest hotel fire in U.S. history.
119	1951	West Frankfort, Illinois	Accident – coal mine	West Frankfort, Illinois		
119	1972	Hurricane Agnes	Tropical cyclone	Eastern United States	$2,100,000,000	
117	1899	New Richmond tornado	Tornado	New Richmond, Wisconsin	>$300,000 ($11.6 million in 2025 dollars).	Tornado hit the same time the circus was in town.
116	1918	1918 San Fermín earthquake	Earthquake	Puerto Rico		
115	1837	Wreck of the Mexico	Accident – shipwreck	Long Beach, New York		
115	1902	Shiloh Baptist Church stampede	Stampede	Birmingham, Alabama		
115	1938	Los Angeles flood of 1938	Flood	Los Angeles, California	$78 million (1938)	Deadliest disaster in Los Angeles history
115	1944	USS St. Augustine (PG-54)	Accident – shipwreck	Off Cape May, New Jersey		
115	1964	Good Friday earthquake	Earthquake, tsunami	Alaska, Hawaii, Oregon, California	$1,800,000,000 (2006)	
114	1902	1902 Goliad, Texas tornado	Tornado	Goliad, Texas		
114	1924	April 1924 tornado outbreak	Tornado outbreak	Southern United States		Including 53 deaths from a single tornado in South Carolina
114	1981	Hyatt Regency walkway collapse	Accident – collapse	Kansas City, Missouri		
113	1975	Eastern Air Lines Flight 66	Accident – aircraft	New York City, New York		
112	1902	Rolling Mill Mine	Accident – coal mine	Johnstown, Pennsylvania		
112+	1905	1905 Snyder tornado	Tornado	Snyder, Oklahoma		
112	1915	Layland, West Virginia § Mine disaster	Accident – coal mine	Layland, West Virginia		
112	1989	United Airlines Flight 232	Accident – aircraft	Sioux City, Iowa		
112	2008	Hurricane Ike	Tropical cyclone	Texas; Louisiana	$30,000,000,000 (2008)	34 people still missing as of 2013
111	1928	SS Vestris	Accident – shipwreck	Off Hampton Roads, Virginia		
111	1947	Centralia mine disaster	Accident – coal mine	Centralia, Illinois		
111	1971	Alaska Airlines Flight 1866	Accident – aircraft	Juneau, Alaska		
110	1869	Avondale Mine disaster	Accident – coal mine	Plymouth, Pennsylvania		
110	1996	ValuJet Flight 592	Accident – aircraft	Florida Everglades		
109	1891	Mammoth Mine disaster	Accident – coal mine	Westmoreland County, Pennsylvania		
106	2017	Hurricane Harvey	Tropical cyclone	Texas, Louisiana	$125,000,000,000 (2017)	Tied with Hurricane Katrina as the costliest natural disaster in United States history. One additional death occurred in Guyana.
104	1694	Raid on Oyster River	Massacre	Durham, New Hampshire		A group of Abenaki and some Maliseet, directed by the French, attacked an English settlement.
103	1837	Racer's hurricane	Tropical cyclone, shipwreck	Mexico, Texas, Gulf Coast		Fatalities estimated; including 90 deaths from the wreck of SS Home off Cape Hatteras; additional two deaths occurred in the Republic of Texas
103	1884	SS City of Columbus	Accident – shipwreck	Off Aquinnah, Massachusetts		
102	1955	1955 Great Plains tornado outbreak	Tornado outbreak	Central United States		46 tornadoes, including the following: Udall, Kansas: 80 deaths; Blackwell, Oklahoma: 20 deaths
102+	2023	2023 Hawaii wildfires	Wildfire	Hawaii		
101	1918	Great Train Wreck of 1918	Accident – railroad	Nashville, Tennessee		Deadliest rail accident in U.S. history
101	1963	Northwest Airlines Flight 293	Accident – aircraft	Near Annette Island, Alaska		
101	1972	Eastern Air Lines Flight 401	Accident – aircraft	Miami, Florida		
100	1812	1812 Louisiana hurricane	Tropical cyclone	Louisiana		Fatalities estimated
100+	1850	Anglo-Norman (steamboat)	Boiler explosion	New Orleans, Louisiana		Fatalities estimated
100+	1852	Saluda (steamship)	Accident – shipwreck	Lexington, Missouri		
100–125	1865	SS Pewabic	Accident – shipwreck	Lake Huron		
100	1892	Krebs, Oklahoma § 1892 mining explosion	Accident – coal mine	Krebs, Oklahoma (then Choctaw nation, Indian Territory)		Natural gas explosion
100+	1899	Great Blizzard of 1899	Winter storm, cold wave	Contiguous United States		
100	1900	1900 Guam typhoon	Tropical cyclone	Guam		
100	1918	T. A. Gillespie Company Shell Loading Plant explosion	Accident – explosion	Sayreville, New Jersey		Fatalities estimated
100+	1937	Elixir sulfanilamide	Mass poisoning	United States		
100	1978	Northeastern United States blizzard of 1978	Blizzard	Northeastern United States	$1,075,000,000 (2010)	Fatalities estimated
100	2003	The Station nightclub fire	Fire (building)	West Warwick, Rhode Island		4th-deadliest nightclub fire in U.S. history, killing 100 people and injuring more than 200.
100	2022	December 2022 North American winter storm	Winter storm	Pacific Northwest, Central United States, Eastern United States		Six additional deaths were reported in Canada
99	1880	Marshfield Cyclone	Tornado	Springfield metropolitan area, Missouri	$1,000,000	
99	1968	USS Scorpion (SSN-589)	Accident – submarine	North Atlantic Ocean 1500 km west of Madeira		U.S. Navy investigation of cause was inconclusive, although suggested an internal hydrogen explosion may have been followed by collapse of hull, followed by immediately sinking to ocean floor, killing all hands.
99	2017	Hurricane Irma	Tropical cyclone	Puerto Rico, United States Virgin Islands, Eastern United States (particularly Florida)	$53,400,000,000 (2017)	Includes three deaths and $1 billion (2017 USD) in damage in Puerto Rico, and four deaths and $2.4 billion in damage in the U.S. Virgin Islands. Storm caused an additional 35 deaths and approximately US$11.4 billion in damage across the rest of the Caribbean.
98	1877	USS Huron (1875)	Accident – shipwreck	Off Nags Head, North Carolina		
98	1890	Sea Wing disaster	Accident – shipwreck	Lake Pepin near Lake City, Minnesota		Strong winds toppled the excursion vessel.
98+	1903	1903 Gainesville tornado	Tornado	Gainesville, Georgia		
98	1922	Knickerbocker Theatre	Roof collapse	Washington, District of Columbia		Roof collapsed due to the eponymous Knickerbocker storm
98	2021	Surfside condominium collapse	Structural collapse	Surfside, Florida		
97+	1900	Tornado outbreak of November 20–21, 1900	Tornado outbreak	Southern United States		At least 14 tornadoes, including the following: Moon Lake–Stray Horn, Mississippi/La Grange, Tennessee: 42 deaths; Columbia, Tennessee: 27 deaths
97	1904	Eden train wreck	Accident – railroad	Pueblo, Colorado		
97	1974	Pan Am Flight 806	Accident – aircraft	Pago Pago, American Samoa		
96+	1875	March 1875 Southeast tornado outbreak	Tornado outbreak	Southeastern United States		Including at least 28 deaths from a single tornado between Georgia and South Carolina
96	1910	Wellington avalanche	Avalanche	Wellington, Washington		Avalanche hit 2 trains in Tye Canyon
96	1977	Southern Airways Flight 242; Tornado outbreak of April 1977	Accident – aircraft; tornado outbreak	New Hope, Paulding County, Georgia; tornadoes affected Southeastern United States		Storm system caused the crash of Flight 242, killing 72 people; and spawned an outbreak of 21 tornadoes, killing 24 people, including an F5 which killed 22 people near Birmingham, Alabama
96–98	1986	Dupont Plaza Hotel arson	mass murder – arson	San Juan, Puerto Rico		
95	1954	Hurricane Hazel	Tropical cyclone	North Carolina; South Carolina		U.S. victims only
95	1958	Our Lady of the Angels School fire	Fire (building)	Chicago, Illinois		
95	1962	American Airlines Flight 1	Accident – aircraft	New York City, New York		
95	2021	Tornado outbreak of December 10–11, 2021	Tornado outbreak	Southern United States, Midwestern United States		Including 6 non-tornadic and indirect deaths; 71 tornadoes, including the following: Western Kentucky: 58 deaths (including one indirect); Bowling Green, Kentucky: 17 deaths (including one indirect)
94	1969	February 1969 nor'easter	Winter storm	Northeastern United States		
93	1918	Malbone Street wreck	Accident – railroad	Brooklyn, New York		Some accounts give death toll as 101. Deadliest accident on New York City subway, deadliest rail disaster in city's history and deadliest mass-transit accident in U.S. history.
93	1939	1939 California tropical storm	Tropical cyclone	Southern California		Including 48 offshore deaths
93	2021	Hurricane Ida	Tropical cyclone	Gulf Coast of the United States, Eastern United States		
92	1876	Ashtabula River railroad disaster	Accident – railroad	Ashtabula, Ohio		Fatalities approximated
92	1919	Tornado outbreak of April 1919	Tornado outbreak	Great Plains		At least 12 tornadoes, including the following: Mineola–Mount Pleasant, Texas: 24 deaths; Blue Ridge–Ravenna, Texas: 18 deaths; Eustace–Grand Saline, Texas: 17 deaths
92	1919	Baltimore Mine Tunnel disaster	Accident – coal mine	Wilkes-Barre, Pennsylvania		
92	1974	TWA Flight 514	Accident – aircraft	Berryville, Virginia		
92	2024	Mid-January 2024 North American winter storm	Winter storm	Contiguous United States		
91	1972	Sunshine Mine	Accident – silver mine	Big Creek, Idaho		Mass carbon monoxide poisoning
90	1899	Windsor Hotel fire	Fire (building)	Manhattan, New York		Fatalities estimated
89	1973	Delta Air Lines Flight 723	Accident – aircraft	Boston, Massachusetts		
88–145	1860	Pemberton Mill	Structural collapse	Lawrence, Massachusetts		
88	1907	SS Columbia (1880)	Accident – shipwreck	Off Shelter Cove, California		
88	2000	Alaska Airlines Flight 261	Accident – aircraft	Pacific Ocean near Anacapa Island, California		
87+	1886	1886 St. Cloud–Sauk Rapids tornado outbreak	Tornado outbreak	Central Minnesota	$400,000	Including 72 deaths from the St. Cloud–Sauk Rapids tornado
87	1918	Columbia (collapsed paddle steamer)	Accident – shipwreck	Creve Coeur, Illinois		
87	1952	1952 Moses Lake C-124 crash	Accident – aircraft	Near Moses Lake, Washington		
87	1990	Happy Land fire	mass murder – arson	New York City, New York		Deadliest mass murder by a single person in U.S. history.
86	1910	Great Fire of 1910	Wildfire	Washington, Idaho, Montana		
86	1918	Hammond Circus Train Wreck	Accident – railroad	Hammond, Indiana		
86	1993	Waco siege	Police raid – Fire	Branch Davidian Complex, Waco, Texas		6 Davidians and 4 police killed in initial raid. Weeks later during final FBI assault, 76 Davidians died in a fire of disputed origin.
85	1878	USS Stars and Stripes (1861)	Accident – shipwreck	Currituck, North Carolina		
85–90	1924	1924 Lorain–Sandusky tornado	Tornado	Lorain and Sandusky, Ohio	$12,500,000	
85	1951	Woodbridge train wreck	Accident – railroad	Woodbridge, New Jersey		
85+	1967	Long, hot summer of 1967	Periods of mass unrest	Major cities in the United States like, Detroit, Newark, and Milwaukee		The riots were mainly caused by racial tension, poverty, and police brutality. These were one of many instances of mass racial violence in the United States
85	1964	Paradise Airlines Flight 901A	Accident – aircraft	Near Lake Tahoe, Nevada		
85	1968	Braniff Flight 352	Accident – aircraft	Dawson, Texas		
85	1980	MGM Grand fire	Fire (building)	Las Vegas, Nevada		
85	2018	Camp Fire	Wildfire	Paradise, California		Deadliest fire in California history.
84	1911	Cross Mountain Mine disaster	Accident – coal mine	Briceville, Tennessee		
84+	1916	1916 Charleston hurricane	Tropical cyclone, flood	South Carolina, North Carolina, Tennessee, Georgia, Virginia		Most deaths were due to a flood event
84+	1927	Great Vermont Flood of 1927	Flood	Vermont		
84	1965	Eastern Air Lines Flight 663	Accident – aircraft	New York City, New York		
84	1977	Johnstown flood of 1977	Flash flood	Johnstown, Pennsylvania	$300,000,000	The flood occurred when an extraordinary amount of rain came down in the Conemaugh Valley in a short period of time. Nearly 12 inches were measured in 10 hours. The National Weather Service later estimated that this amount of rain in that location should happen less than once every 1,000 years.
84	1999	Hurricane Floyd	Tropical cyclone	East Coast of the United States		
84	2007	January 2007 North American ice storm	Winter storm	Central United States, Eastern United States		Additional three deaths in Canada
83	1966	American Flyers Flight 280	Accident – aircraft	Near Ardmore, Oklahoma		
83	1969	Allegheny Airlines Flight 853	Accident – aircraft	Shelby County, Indiana		A Piper Cherokee 140, piloted by a student who was a week away from getting his private pilot's license, collided with an Allegheny Airlines DC-9. The flight originated in Boston and had stopped in Baltimore and Cincinnati.
82+	1927	Tornado outbreak of September 29, 1927	Tornado	Midwestern and Southern United States	$22,000,000	Including at least 72 deaths from the St. Louis–East St. Louis tornado
82	1930	Millfield Mine disaster	Accident – coal mine	Dover Township, Athens County, Ohio		
82	1967	Piedmont Airlines Flight 22	Accident – aircraft	Hendersonville, North Carolina		
82	1986	1986 Cerritos mid-air collision	Accident – aircraft	Cerritos, California		
81–85	1887	Great Chatsworth train wreck	Accident – railroad	Chatsworth, Illinois		
81	1963	Pan Am Flight 214	Accident – aircraft	Elkton, Maryland		Lightning strike
81	1963	1963 Indiana State Fairgrounds Coliseum gas explosion	Accident – explosion	Indianapolis, Indiana		

== 41 to 80 deaths ==
Fatalities	Year	Article	Type	Location	Damage (US$)	Comments
80+	1813	USS Hamilton (1809) and USS Scourge (1812)	Accident – shipwreck	Lake Ontario		Two ships sank during a squall
80+	1880	PS Alpena	Accident – shipwreck	Lake Michigan		
80+	1864	Washoe	Boiler explosion	Steamboat Slough, California		
80+	1910	Palos No. 3 coal mine	Accident – coal mine	Jefferson County, Alabama		
80+	1960	March 1960 nor'easter	Winter storm	Northeastern United States		
80	1960	World Airways Flight 830	Accident – aircraft	Barrigada, Guam		
79	1943	Frankford Junction train wreck	Accident – railroad	Philadelphia, Pennsylvania		
78	1862	Allegheny Arsenal	Accident – explosion	Pittsburgh, Pennsylvania		Largest civilian death toll during American Civil War
78	1875	Precious Blood Church fire	Fire (building)	Holyoke, Massachusetts		
78	1911	Austin Dam failure (Pennsylvania)	Dam failure	Keating Township, Potter County, Pennsylvania		
78	1950	Kew Gardens train crash	Accident – railroad	Kew Gardens, New York		Deadliest surface rail accident in New York City
78	1961	TWA Flight 529	Accident – aircraft	Hinsdale, Illinois		
78	1968	Farmington Mine disaster	Accident – coal mine	Farmington, West Virginia		
78	1976	MV George Prince ferry disaster	Accident – shipwreck	Mississippi River, Louisiana		Deadliest ferry disaster in U.S. history
78	1982	Air Florida Flight 90	Accident – aircraft	District of Columbia		
77	1923	Cleveland School fire	Fire (building)	Camden, South Carolina		
77	1947	North American blizzard of 1947	Winter storm	Mid-Atlantic		
77	1929	SS San Juan	Accident – shipwreck	Off California		Collided with S.C.T. Dodd
77	1961	Imperial Airlines Flight 201/8	Accident – aircraft	Richmond, Virginia		
76	1872	Skeleton Cave Massacre	Massacre	Salt River Canyon, Arizona		
76+	1883	Tornado outbreak of March 13–14, 1913	Tornado outbreak	Midwestern and Southern United States		Including 15 deaths from the Armuchee–Curryville–Resaca, Georgia tornado
76	1985	1985 United States–Canada tornado outbreak	Tornado outbreak	New York, Ohio, Pennsylvania, Ontario	$1,270,000,000 (2019)	Including two tornadoes which crossed the Ohio–Pennsylvania border and killed 16 and 18 people respectively; additional 14 deaths in Ontario
75	1863	Chunky Creek train wreck	Accident – railroad	Newton County, Mississippi		Fatalities estimated
75	1943	Smith Mine disaster	Accident – coal mine	Between Bearcreek and Washoe, Montana		74 miners and one rescue worker
75	1965	Hurricane Betsy	Tropical cyclone	Florida, Louisiana		
75	1970	Southern Airways Flight 932	Accident – aircraft	Ceredo, West Virginia		Deadliest sports tragedy in U.S. history; killed virtually all of the Marshall University Thundering Herd Football team, coaches and boosters when it crashed on approach for landing in a thunderstorm.
74	1927	1927 Rocksprings tornado	Tornado	Rocksprings and Leakey, Texas		
74	1949	St. Anthony's Hospital fire	Fire (building)	Effingham, Illinois		
74	1868	United States and America steamboat disaster	Boat collision	Near Warsaw, Kentucky		Fatalities estimated
74	1955	Hurricane Connie	Tropical cyclone	East Coast of the United States, Puerto Rico		27 deaths in North Carolina, 14 in the Chesapeake Bay, 14 in New York, six in Pennsylvania, six in New Jersey, four in Washington, D.C., and three in Puerto Rico
74	1956	Linea Aeropostal Venezolana Flight 253 (June 1956)	Accident – aircraft	Atlantic Ocean, off New Jersey		
74	1969	Melbourne-Evans collision	Accident – maritime	South China Sea		
73	1913	Italian Hall disaster	Stampede	Calumet, Michigan		Second-largest loss of life within the state of Michigan.
73	1925	1925 Florida tropical storm	Tropical cyclone	East Coast of the United States		
73	1933	USS Akron	Accident – Airship	Atlantic Ocean, off the coast of New Jersey		Deadliest airship disaster in history.
73	1990	Avianca Flight 52	Accident – aircraft	Cove Neck, New York		
72	1811	Richmond Theatre fire	Fire (building)	Richmond, Virginia		
72	1932	Observation (steamboat)	Accident – explosion	East River, New York City		
72	1943	Rennert railroad accident	Accident – railroad	Rennert, North Carolina		
72	1957	Warrenton Nursing Home fire	Fire (building)	Warrenton, Missouri		
72	1968	Tornado outbreak of May 1968	Tornado outbreak	Central United States, Southern United States	$52,500,000	Including a tornado which struck Jonesboro, Arkansas and killed 35 people in total
72	1974	Eastern Air Lines Flight 212	Accident – aircraft	Charlotte, North Carolina		
71	1878	Gale of 1878	Tropical cyclone	East Coast of the United States		
71	1978	Great Blizzard of 1978	Winter storm	Great Lakes region		
70+	1883	Newhall House Hotel Fire	Fire (building)	Milwaukee, Wisconsin		
70	1967	TWA Flight 128	Accident – aircraft	Constance, Kentucky		
70	1954	Hurricane Carol	Tropical cyclone	Mid-Atlantic United States, New England		
70	1975	Great Storm of 1975	Blizzard, tornado outbreak	Midwestern United States, Southeastern United States		58 deaths from blizzard, 12 from tornadoes
70	1985	Galaxy Airlines Flight 203	Accident – aircraft	Reno, Nevada		
69	1936	Pittsburgh Flood of 1936	Flood	Pittsburgh, Pennsylvania area	$3,000,000,000 (2006)	
69	1989	Loma Prieta earthquake	Earthquake	San Francisco Bay Area, California	$6,000,000,000 (1989)	Including 42 deaths due to the collapse of the Cypress Street Viaduct
68	1882	1882 Grinnell tornado	Tornado	Grinnell and Malcom, Iowa		
68	1994	American Eagle Flight 4184	Accident – aircraft	Roselawn, Indiana		
67	2025	2025 Potomac River mid-air collision	Accident – aircraft	Potomac River near Washington D.C.		Deadliest accident involving a helicopter in U.S. history
66	1888	Mud Run disaster	Accident – railroad	Eastern Pennsylvania		
66	1905	USS Bennington (PG-4) § Boiler explosion	Accident – explosion	San Diego, California		
66	1955	1955 Hawaii R6D-1 crash	Accident – aircraft	Waianae Range, Hawaii Territory		
66	1955	United Airlines Flight 409	Accident – aircraft	Medicine Bow Peak, Wyoming		
65+	1902	Yacolt Burn	Wildfires	Washington, Oregon		
65	1959	American Airlines Flight 320	Accident – aircraft	New York City, New York		
65	1971	Sylmar earthquake	Earthquake	Greater Los Angeles Area, California	$500,000,000	
65	2009	January 2009 North American ice storm	Winter storm	Central United States		
64-77	1879	Fort Robinson massacre	Massacre	Fort Robinson, Nebraska		
64	1903	Connellsville train wreck	Accident – railroad	Connellsville, Pennsylvania		
64	1983	1983 United States embassy bombing	Terrorism	Beirut, Lebanon		
63	1883	Tivoli pier collapse	Structural collapse	Sparrows Point, Maryland		
63	1940	Sonman Mine explosion	Accident – coal mine	Portage Township, Cambria County, Pennsylvania		
63	1960	Northwest Orient Airlines Flight 710	Accident – aircraft	Tell City, Indiana		Wing failure resulting from freak vibrations in clear weather turbulence was the probable cause.
63	1963	Golden Age Nursing Home fire	Fire (building)	Fitchville, Ohio		
63	1992	1992 Los Angeles riots	Riot	Los Angeles County, California	~$1,000,000,000	An incident of civil unrest sparked by the beating of Rodney King. It was the second deadliest incident of civil unrest in modern U.S. history since the New York City Draft Riots.
62	1960	Eastern Air Lines Flight 375	Accident – aircraft	Boston, Massachusetts		
62	1985	1985 Election Day floods	Flood	Virginia, West Virginia		
61	1944	Freckleton air disaster	Military aircraft, Accident	Freckleton, England		An American United States Army Air Forces Consolidated B-24 Liberator heavy bomber crashed into the center of the village of Freckleton. It crashed into a school, 3 houses, and a cafe. Sixty-one individuals, including 38 children and two teenagers, were killed. Ten American servicemen were among the fatalities.
61	1946	La Salle Hotel	Fire (building)	Chicago, Illinois		
61	1960	Great Chilean earthquake	Tsunami	Hawaii, Alaska	$500,000 (2005)	2,290 to 6,600 killed and $3,500,000,000 (2005) in damage worldwide. 61 killed in Hilo, Hawaii. $500,000 in U.S. property damage
61	1992	Hurricane Andrew	Tropical cyclone	Florida, Louisiana	$27,250,000,000 (1992)	
61	2017	2017 Las Vegas shooting	Mass shooting	Paradise, Nevada		60 victims and 1 perpetrator, with the perpetrator committing suicide. The deadliest mass shooting by an individual in U.S. history.
60+	1856	PS Niagara	Accident – shipwreck	Off Belgium, Wisconsin		
60–72	1864	Shohola train wreck	Accident – railroad	Shohola, Pennsylvania		Train collision along upper Delaware River. Official death toll is 65.
60	1886	1886 Charleston earthquake	Earthquake	South Carolina, North Carolina, Virginia, East coast of the United States	$5,000,000–6,000,000	Massive earthquake starting in South Carolina, spreading across the East Coast of the US.
60	1966	Hurricane Inez	Tropical cyclone	Florida Keys, Gulf Coast of the United States		Including 45 deaths from the capsizing of a boat in the Straits of Florida and 11 deaths from a helicopter crash in the Gulf of Mexico
60	1967	1967 Chicago blizzard	Winter storm	Midwestern United States		26 deaths in Chicago
59–67	1856	Great Train Wreck of 1856	Accident – railroad	Fort Washington, Pennsylvania		
59	1908	Hanna Mine disasters	Accident – coal mine	Carbon County, Wyoming		
59	1957	May 1957 Central Plains tornado outbreak sequence	Tornado outbreak sequence	Great Plains, Midwestern United States		Including 44 deaths from the Ruskin Heights tornado
59	2015	December 2015 North American storm complex	Tornado outbreak, winter storm, flood	Southwestern, Central, and New England	$1,200,000,000 (2015)	
59	2018	Hurricane Michael	Tropical cyclone	Florida, Georgia, North Carolina, South Carolina, Virginia	$25,000,000,000	Category 5 hurricane that caused 16 direct and 43 indirect deaths in the US, as well as 15 in Central America
58+	1865	Yosemite explosion	Boiler explosion	Sacramento River		
58	1896	Twin Shaft disaster	Accident – coal mine	Pittston, Pennsylvania		
58	1905	Grover Shoe Factory disaster	Accident – explosion	Brockton, Massachusetts		
58	1950	Northwest Orient Airlines Flight 2501	Accident – aircraft	Lake Michigan		Airplane wreckage never found
58	1951	1951 Miami Airlines C-46 crash	Accident – aircraft	Elizabeth, New Jersey		First of three plane crashes in Elizabeth over three months
58	1964	Eastern Air Lines Flight 304	Accident – aircraft	Lake Pontchartrain, Louisiana		
58	1965	American Airlines Flight 383	Accident – aircraft	Cincinnati, Ohio		
58	1966	Tornado outbreak of March 3–4, 1966	Tornado	Southeastern United States	$75,500,000	All 58 deaths due to the Candlestick Park tornado
58	1967	1967 Oak Lawn tornado outbreak	Tornado outbreak	Upper Midwest		45 tornadoes, including the following: Oak Lawn–Evergreen Park–Chicago South Side, Illinois: 33 deaths; Belvidere, Illinois: 24 deaths
58	1979	1979 Red River Valley tornado outbreak	Tornado outbreak	Midwestern United States, Southern United States		Including the Wichita Falls, Texas tornado which killed 42 people
57	1903	1903 New Jersey hurricane	Tropical cyclone	Mid-Atlantic		
57	1919	1919 Fergus Falls tornado	Tornado	Fergus Falls, Minnesota	$4,000,000	
57	1980	1980 eruption of Mount St. Helens	Volcano	Washington	$1,100,000,000	
57	1984	1984 Carolinas tornado outbreak	Tornado outbreak	Georgia, North Carolina, South Carolina		
57	1994	Northridge earthquake	Earthquake	Greater Los Angeles area, California	$23,000,000,000	
57	1999	1999 Oklahoma tornado outbreak	Tornado outbreak	Oklahoma, Kansas, Texas, Tennessee	$1,500,000,000 (2005)	66 tornadoes, including the 1999 Bridge Creek–Moore tornado, which killed 36 people; also including seven non-tornadic deaths
57	2007	Mid-December 2007 North American winter storms	Winter storm	Central United States, Eastern United States		Two winter storms in quick succession, the latter of which caused an additional six deaths in Canada
57	2008	2008 Super Tuesday tornado outbreak	Tornado outbreak	Tennessee, Arkansas, Kentucky, Alabama, and Illinois	$1,200,000,000	Including the Castalian Springs–Lafayette, Tennessee/Tompkinsville, Kentucky tornado which killed 22 people
56	1844	Lucy Walker steamboat disaster	Accident – explosion, shipwreck	Ohio River, near New Albany, Indiana		Exact number of fatalities unknown
56	1875	City of Waco	Accident – shipwreck	Off Galveston, Texas		
56	1904	New Market train wreck	Accident – railroad	New Market, Tennessee		
56	1912	Tornado outbreak of April 20–22, 1912	Tornado outbreak	High Plains, Upper Midwest, Southern United States		
55	1880	SS Narragansett	Accident – shipwreck, fire	Long Island Sound		Fatalities estimated
55	1898	1898 Fort Smith, Arkansas, tornado	Tornado	Fort Smith, Arkansas		
55+	1905	Mataafa Storm	Winter storm, shipwrecks	Great Lakes region		Approximately 29 vessels destroyed or damaged, including SS Mataafa and SS Ira H. Owen
55	1943	Gulf Hotel fire	Fire (building)	Houston, Texas		
55	1949	Eastern Air Lines Flight 537	Accident – aircraft	Alexandria, Virginia		
55	1975	Hurricane Eloise	Tropical cyclone	Puerto Rico, Eastern United States		
55	2016	January 2016 United States blizzard	Blizzard	Eastern United States	$500,000,000, to $3,000,000,000 (2016)	
54	1932	1932 Moweaqua Coal Mine disaster	Accident – coal mine	Moweaqua, Illinois		
54	2004	Hurricane Ivan	Tropical cyclone	Texas, Florida	$13,000,000,000 (2004)	Damage and death figures are for the U.S. only. Storm caused an additional 67 deaths and ~US$7 billion in damage across the Caribbean.
54	2018	Hurricane Florence	Tropical cyclone	Virginia, North Carolina, South Carolina	$24,230,000,000	Category 4 hurricane that caused major damage and 54 recorded fatalities in the US; 24 direct and 30 indirect.
53	1906	1906 Atlantic City train wreck	Accident – railroad	Atlantic City, New Jersey		
53	1906	1906 Washington, D.C., train wreck	Accident – railroad	Washington, D.C.		
53	1913	Tornado outbreak of March 20–21, 1913	Tornado outbreak	Southern United States	$655,000	Including 27 deaths from the Fulton–Lower Peach Tree, Alabama tornado
53	1925	Coal Glen mine disaster	Accident – coal mine	Farmville, Chatham County, North Carolina		
53	1942	Battle of Dutch Harbor	Military strike – bombing	Unalaska, Alaska		43 American and 10 Japanese fatalities. Deadliest attack on continental U.S. by a foreign power since the Mexican–American War.
53	1947	Eastern Air Lines Flight 605	Accident – aircraft	Near Port Deposit, Maryland		
53	1949	1949 Strato-Freight Curtiss C-46A crash	Accident – aircraft	West of San Juan-Isla Grande Airport, Puerto Rico		
53	1965	1965 Searcy missile silo fire	Fire – underground	Searcy, Arkansas		
53	2008	Hurricane Gustav	Tropical cyclone	Louisiana, Mississippi, Alabama, Florida		
53	2022	2022 San Antonio migrant deaths	Suspected migrant smuggling operation	San Antonio, Texas		Twelve others hospitalized.
52	1910	Green Mountain train wreck	Accident – railroad	Green Mountain, Iowa		
52	1929	SS Milwaukee (1902)	Accident – shipwreck	Lake Michigan		
52	1940	Hercules Powder plant disaster	Accident – explosion	Roxbury, New Jersey		Fatalities estimated
52	1940	1940 South Carolina hurricane	Tropical cyclone	Georgia, South Carolina, North Carolina, Tennessee, Virginia		
52	1947	United Airlines Flight 608	Accident – aircraft	Bryce Canyon, Utah		
52	1952	Pan Am Flight 526A	Accident – aircraft	Off San Juan, Puerto Rico		
52	1952	1952 Mount Gannett C-124 crash	Accident – aircraft	Mount Gannett, Alaska Territory		
51	1947	1947 Fort Lauderdale hurricane	Tropical cyclone	Florida, Louisiana, Mississippi		
51	1956	SS Andrea Doria, MV Astoria	Accident – shipwreck	Off the coast of Nantucket, Massachusetts		
51	1978	Willow Island disaster	Accident – Construction	Willow Island, West Virginia		Scaffolding fell 166 feet (51 m) with insufficiently cured concrete
51	2003	Hurricane Isabel	Tropical cyclone, Flooding	Virginia, Florida, North Carolina, West Virginia, Washington, D.C., Maryland, Delaware, Pennsylvania, New Jersey, New York, Rhode Island, Ontario	5,500,000,000 (2003)	Worst hurricane to hit Virginia
50	1852	Henry Clay (steamboat)	Accident – shipwreck	Riverdale, Bronx, New York		Fatalities estimated
50	1863	Brown's Island Confederate Laboratory	Explosion in ammunition factory	Richmond, Virginia		70 killed or wounded. 50 fatalities in total over several weeks.
50+	1871	Port Huron Fire of 1871	Wildfire	Port Huron, Michigan		
50	1896	1896 Atlantic City rail crash	Accident – railroad	Atlantic City, New Jersey		
50–52	1918	Split Rock, New York	Accident – explosion	Split Rock, New York		
50	1925	Rockport train wreck	Accident – railroad	Hackettstown, New Jersey		
50	1947	Pennsylvania Central Airlines Flight 410	Accident – aircraft	Near Charles Town, West Virginia		
50	1951	United Airlines Flight 610	Accident – aircraft	West of Fort Collins, Colorado		
50	1951	United Airlines Flight 615	Accident – aircraft	Near Decoto, California		
50	1960	Capital Airlines Flight 20	Accident – aircraft	Holdcroft, Virginia		
50	1971	Hughes Airwest Flight 706	Accident – aircraft	San Gabriel Mountains, Los Angeles County, California		
50	1993	Great Flood of 1993	Flood	Midwest	$15,000,000,000	
50	2003	Tornado outbreak sequence of May 2003	Tornado outbreak sequence	Great Plains, Eastern United States	$4,100,000,000	Including nine non-tornadic deaths
50	2009	Colgan Air Flight 3407	Accident – aircraft	Clarence Center, New York		
50	2016	Orlando nightclub shooting	Terrorism	Orlando, Florida		49 victims and 1 perpetrator, who was shot and killed by police. The second-deadliest mass shooting in U.S. history, after the 2017 Las Vegas shooting.
49	1867	Angola Horror	Accident – railroad	Angola, New York		
49	1892	Giant Powder Company	Accident – explosions	Albany, California		Explosion in explosives manufacturing plant destroyed facility, caused extensive damage in nearby Berkeley. Official death toll was 49, though estimates of unrecovered bodies ran higher.
49	1917	Shepherdsville train wreck	Accident – railroad	Shepherdsville, Kentucky		
49	1936	1936 Cordele–Greensboro tornado outbreak	Tornado outbreak	Southeastern United States		Including 23 deaths from a tornado near Cordele, Georgia
49	1953	Tornado outbreak sequence of Early-December 1953	Tornado outbreak sequence	Southeastern United States	$45,709,000	Including 38 deaths from the Vicksburg, Mississippi tornado
49	1958	United Airlines Flight 736	Accident – aircraft	Enterprise, Nevada		
49	1989	Hurricane Hugo	Tropical cyclone	East Coast of the United States.	$7,000,000,000 (1989)	Damage figure for U.S. only. At least 111 total deaths, with 37 in the continental U.S., as far north as Michigan, and 12 in the U.S. possession of Puerto Rico.
49	2004	Hurricane Frances	Tropical cyclone	Florida	$9,000,000,000	
49	2006	Comair Flight 5191	Accident – aircraft	Lexington, Kentucky		
49	2011	Hurricane Irene	Tropical cyclone	Puerto Rico, East Coast of the United States	$15,800,000,000 (2011)	49 fatalities in U.S., including 1 in Puerto Rico, with 10 additional fatalities elsewhere.
48	1853	Norwalk rail accident	Accident – railroad	Norwalk, Connecticut		
48	1866	Memphis massacre of 1866	Mass racial violence	Memphis, Tennessee		
48	1924	USS Mississippi (BB-41) turret explosion		San Pedro, Los Angeles, California		
48	1942	Joliet Army Ammunition Plant	Accident – explosion	Will County, Illinois		
48	1944	Bagley train wreck	Accident – railroad	West of Ogden, Utah		
48	1958	Newark Bay rail accident	Accident – railroad	Newark Bay, New Jersey		
48	2024	Hurricane Beryl	Tropical cyclone	Texas, Louisiana, Ohio Valley, Northeastern United States		
47	1912	1912 United States cold wave	Cold wave	Midwestern United States		
47+	1917	March 1917 tornado outbreak	Tornado outbreak	Ohio Valley		Including 46 deaths from a single tornado in Indiana and Kentucky
47	1922	Argonaut Mine	Accident – gold mine	Jackson, California		
47	1933	1933 Chesapeake–Potomac hurricane	Tropical cyclone	East Coast of the United States		
47	1938	Custer Creek train wreck	Accident – railroad	Saugus, Montana		
47	1944	Stockton train wreck	Accident – railroad	Stockton, Georgia		
47	1946	Tornado outbreak of January 4–6, 1946	Tornado outbreak	South—Central United States		Including 15 deaths in the Log Lake–Southview–Palestine tornado, which is considered one of the worst tornadoes in the history of Texas.
47	1958	Capital Airlines Flight 67	Accident – aircraft	Saginaw Bay, near Freeland, Michigan		
47	1989	USS Iowa turret explosion	Accident – explosion	Caribbean Sea, off Puerto Rico		
47	1993	Big Bayou Canot train disaster	Accident – railroad	Mobile, Alabama		Deadliest train crash in Amtrak history.
47	2016	Hurricane Matthew	Tropical cyclone	Florida, Georgia, The Carolinas	$10,000,000,000 (2016)	Damage and death figures are for the U.S. only. Storm caused an additional 551 deaths and US$5.08 billion in damage across the Caribbean.
46	1873	Dixon Bridge Disaster	Accident – bridge collapse	Dixon, Illinois		
46	1886	1886 Indianola hurricane	Tropical cyclone	Indianola, Texas		
46	1900	Red Ash Mine disasters	Accident – coal mine	Fire Creek, West Virginia		
46	1916	Summer Street Bridge disaster	Accident – railroad	Boston, Massachusetts		
46	1942	USS S-26 (SS-131)	Accident – shipwreck	Gulf of Panama		
46	1953	National Airlines Flight 470	Accident – aircraft	Gulf of Mexico, off Fort Morgan, Alabama		
46	1961	Hurricane Carla	Tropical cyclone	Texas, Louisiana	$325.74 million (U.S. only)	Landed Port O'Connor, Texas on September 11 as Category 4, continued northeast across U.S., dissipated in eastern Canada on September 14.
46	1967	Silver Bridge collapse	Accident – Bridge collapse	Ohio River between Point Pleasant, West Virginia and Gallipolis, Ohio		
46	1976	Air Manila Flight 702	Accident – aircraft	Naval Air Station Agana, Guam		
46	1983	February 1983 North American blizzard	Winter storm	Northeastern United States		
45–91	1871	Staten Island Ferry § Staten Island Railway era	Accident – explosion	New York City, New York		Boiler of Westfield II exploded at South Ferry in Manhattan
45–60	1871	W.R. Norman	Boiler explosion	Mississippi River		Fatalities estimated
45+	1838	General Brown	Boiler explosion	Mississippi River		Fatalities estimated
45+	1912	Tornado outbreak of April 27–29, 1912	Tornado outbreak	Oklahoma, Texas, Louisiana		
45	1935	SS Mohawk (1925) sinking	Ship collision	Near Sea Girt Light, New Jersey		
45	1927	Bath School disaster	mass murder	Bath Township, Michigan		Deadliest act of school violence in U.S. history
45	1938	Grundy, Virginia § Red Jacket Mine explosion	Accident - coal mine	Grundy, Virginia		
45	1946	Naperville train disaster	Accident – railroad	Naperville, Illinois		
45	1950	February 1950 tornado outbreak	Tornado outbreak	Red River of the South, Lower Mississippi Valley		Including 18 deaths from a tornado in northwestern Louisiana
45	1951	FV Pelican	Accident – shipwreck	Off Montauk, New York		
45	1962	Continental Airlines Flight 11	Terrorism	Unionville, Missouri		
45	1972	1972 Chicago commuter rail crash	Accident – railroad	Chicago, Illinois		
45	1972	United Airlines Flight 553	Accident – aircraft	Chicago, Illinois		
44	1925	Pickwick Club collapse	Structural collapse	Boston, Massachusetts		
44	1933	March 1933 Nashville tornado outbreak	Tornado outbreak	Arkansas, Tennessee		At least 5 tornadoes, including the following: Sneedville–Kingsport, Tennessee: 16 deaths; Nashville–Lebanon, Tennessee: 15 deaths
44	1955	United Airlines Flight 629	Accident – aircraft	Longmont, Colorado		Worst mass murder In Colorado.
44	1957	Pan Am Flight 7	Accident – aircraft	Pacific Ocean		
44	1964	Pacific Air Lines Flight 773	Accident – aircraft	Near Danville, California		
44	1966	USS Oriskany fire	Fire (ship)	Gulf of Tonkin		
44	2017	October 2017 Northern California wildfires	Wildfire	California	>$3,000,000,000	The fires killed 44, injured at least 185 people, and destroyed 5,700 homes. The deadliest was the Tubbs Fire, which alone killed 22 people.
44	2025	Tornado outbreak of March 13–17, 2025	Tornado outbreak	Midwestern United States, Southern United States		Including 20 non-tornadic deaths
43	1900	Tacoma streetcar disaster	Accident – railroad	Tacoma, Washington		
43	1915	1915 Ardmore gas explosion	Accident – railroad	Ardmore, Oklahoma	$1,250,000	Overpressured tank car filled with casing head gas exploded, causing major damage and death in the town.
43	1940	Doodlebug disaster	Accident – railroad	Cuyahoga Falls, Ohio		
43	1945	Tornado outbreak of February 12, 1945	Tornado outbreak	Alabama, Mississippi	$1.972 million	Damage total not adjusted for inflation. This outbreak included a devastating tornado that struck Montgomery, Alabama and the U.S. Weather Bureau would describe this tornado as "the most officially observed one in history".
43	1947	United Airlines Flight 521	Accident – aircraft	LaGuardia Airport, New York		
43	1948	United Airlines Flight 624	Accident – aircraft	Near Aristes, Pennsylvania		
43	1951	Cubana de Aviación Flight 493	Accident – aircraft	Key West, Florida		
43	1953	USMC R4Q NROTC crash	Accident – aircraft	Milton, Florida		
43	1963	Northwest Orient Airlines Flight 705	Accident – aircraft	Everglades, Florida		
43	1965	United Airlines Flight 227	Accident – aircraft	Salt Lake City, Utah		
43	1967	1967 Detroit riot	Riot	Detroit, Michigan	~$50,000,000	It was caused by a police raid of a "blind pig", an unlicensed, after-hours bar. The riot was the deadliest of the series of riots that occurred during 1967 in the United States. It contributed to widespread "white flight" in Detroit and economic decline as many businesses were looted, set on fire, or just simply closed or moved out of the city due to the riot.
43	1971	Attica Prison riot	Prison riot	Attica, New York		State troopers opened non-stop fire on prisoners and hostages after a four-day prison uprising, killing 29 of the former and 10 of the latter; one prison guard had also died at the beginning of the riot. It is considered the deadliest one-day encounter between Americans since the Civil War.
43	1987	PSA Flight 1771	Aircraft hijacking	Near Cayucos, California		
43	2011	Tornado outbreak of April 14–16, 2011	Tornado outbreak	Oklahoma, Arkansas, Mississippi, Alabama, North Carolina, Virginia	$2,100,000,000 (2011)	162 tornadoes
43	2012	Tornado outbreak of March 2–3, 2012	Tornado outbreak	Southern United States, Ohio Valley	$3,500,000,000 (2019)	70 tornadoes, with one of the deadliest in Henryville, Indiana. 41 tornadic deaths, with another 2 from related weather.
43	2014	2014 Oso mudslide	Mudflow	Oso, Washington		
42	1846	1846 Havana hurricane	Tropical cyclone	Florida		40 in Key West, Florida, one in Savannah, Georgia, and one in South Carolina
42	1929	1929 Rye Cove tornado outbreak	Tornado outbreak	Virginia, Central and Eastern United States	Unknown damage	Including the thirteenth deadliest tornado strike at a school
42	1943	USS R-12 (SS-89)	Accident – shipwreck	Off Florida		
42	1952	February 1952 nor'easter	Winter storm	New England		Fatalities estimated
42	1959	National Airlines Flight 967	Accident – aircraft	Gulf of Mexico		Disappeared; suspected bombing
42	1966	Braniff Flight 250	Accident – aircraft	Richardson County, Nebraska		
42	1973	1973 Staten Island gas explosion	Accident – explosion	Staten Island, New York		
42	1977	Maury County jail fire	Fire (building)	Maury County, Tennessee		
42	1998	1998 Central Florida tornado outbreak	Tornado outbreak	Central Florida		Including the Intercession City–Port St. John tornado, which killed 25 people
42	2022	July–August 2022 United States floods	Flood	Greater St. Louis, Central Appalachia, Las Vegas Valley		38 direct and two indirect in Kentucky, two direct in Missouri
42	2024	Hurricane Milton	Tropical cyclone	Florida		
41	1859	South Bend train wreck	Bridge washout	South Bend, Indiana		
41	1893	Strafford County Farm fire	Fire (building)	Dover, New Hampshire		
41	1909	1909 Velasco hurricane	Tropical cyclone	Texas		
41	1914	SS Monroe (1902)	Accident – shipwreck	Off Virginia Capes		
41–43	1916	USS Tennessee (ACR-10) § Loss	Accident - rogue wave	Santo Domingo harbor, Dominican Republic		
41	1924	Milford Mine	Accident – iron mine	Wolford Township, Crow Wing County, Minnesota		
41	1950	Genesis Health System § St. Elizabeth's Fire	Fire (building)	Davenport, Iowa		
41	1968	Richmond, Indiana explosion	Natural gas explosion	Richmond, Indiana		
41	1998	Tornado outbreak of April 6–9, 1998	Tornado outbreak	Midwestern United States, Eastern United States		Including the Birmingham Metro tornado, which killed 32 people
41	2001	Tropical Storm Allison	Tropical cyclone	Texas, Louisiana, and Pennsylvania	$8,500,000,000	
41	2020	Hurricane Laura	Tropical cyclone	Louisiana, Texas, Florida		

== 26 to 40 deaths ==
Fatalities	Year	Article	Type	Location	Damage (US$)	Comments
40	1833	St. Martin	Steamship fire	Near Donaldsonville, Louisiana		
40	1901	SS Islander	Accident – shipwreck	Lynn Canal, Alaska		
40–54	1906	Dix (steamboat)	Accident – shipwreck	Alki Point, Seattle, Washington		
40	1927	USS S-4 (SS-109)	Accident – shipwreck	Off Cape Cod, Massachusetts		
40	1932	1932 Freeport hurricane	Tropical cyclone	Texas		
40	1933	1933 Cuba–Brownsville hurricane	Tropical cyclone	South Texas		
40	1953	April–May 1953 tornado outbreak sequence	Tornado outbreak sequence	Southeastern United States	$26,713,000	Including 18 deaths from a tornado in Warner Robins, Georgia; also including four non-tornadic deaths
40	1962	Ash Wednesday Storm of 1962	Winter storm	East Coast of the United States		
40+	1969	Ohio Fireworks Derecho	Derecho	Ohio		
40	1994	1994 Palm Sunday tornado outbreak	Tornado outbreak	Southeastern United States	$140,000,000 (2005)	Including a single tornado which killed 22 people in northeastern Alabama
40	2008	Kingston Fossil Plant coal fly ash slurry spill	Coal ash spill	Kingston, Tennessee		An estimated 40 cleanup workers died due to various illnesses believed to be caused by coal ash exposure
39	1912	Corning train wreck	Accident – railroad	Corning, New York		
39	1846–47	Donner Party	Starvation, exposure, murder	Sierra Nevada		Group of pioneers who experienced extensive troubles while taking the Hasting's Cutoff "shortcut" on the Oregon Trail
39	1913	Long Beach pier auditorium disaster	Structural collapse	Long Beach, California		
39	1964	United Airlines Flight 823	Accident – aircraft	Parrottsville, Tennessee		
39	1968	Wien Consolidated Airlines Flight 55	Accident – aircraft	Pedro Bay, Alaska		
39	1970	Hurricane Creek mine disaster	Accident – coal mine	Hyden, Kentucky		
39	1977	Kelly Barnes Dam	Accident – dam failure	Toccoa, Georgia		
39	1997	Heaven's Gate (religious group)	Mass suicide	San Diego, California		Cult leaders Marshall Applewhite and Bonnie Nettles convinced followers they would join Comet Hale-Bopp to take them to another planet by swallowing poison.
38+	1815	1815 New England hurricane	Tropical cyclone	New England, Long Island		
38	1846	John Minturn	Accident – shipwreck	Mantoloking, New Jersey		
38	1860	SS Northerner	Accident – shipwreck	Centerville, Humboldt County, California		
38+	1886	January 1886 blizzard	Winter storm	Eastern United States		
38	1920	Wall Street bombing	Terrorism	Manhattan, New York		Investigators and historians believe that it was carried out by Galleanists, a group is responsible for a series of letter bombings the previous year.
38	1956	Tornado outbreak of April 2–3, 1956	Tornado outbreak	Central United States	$58,000,000	Including 17 deaths from the Saugatuck–Hudsonville–Standale, Michigan tornado
38	1964	Hurricane Hilda	Tropical cyclone, tornado	Louisiana		Including 22 deaths from a tornado near Larose, Louisiana
38	1967	Lake Central Flight 527	Accident – aircraft	Marseilles Township, Wyandot County, Ohio		
38	1969	United Airlines Flight 266	Accident – aircraft	Santa Monica Bay, California		
38	1973	Ozark Air Lines Flight 809	Accident – aircraft	Normandy, Missouri		
38	2011	2011 Afghanistan Boeing Chinook shootdown	Military strike – rocket-propelled grenade	Maidan Wardak Province, Afghanistan		
38	2014	Tornado outbreak of April 27–30, 2014	Tornado outbreak	Southern United States, Central United States	≥$1,000,000,000 (2014)	84 tornadoes, including the Mayflower–Vilonia, Arkansas tornado which killed 16. 35 tornadic deaths, with another 3 from related weather.
38	2020	2020 Easter tornado outbreak	Tornado outbreak	Southeastern United States, Mid-Atlantic	$3,000,000,000 (2020)	Including six non-tornadic deaths
37	1883	1883 Rochester tornado	Tornado	Rochester, Minnesota	$700,000 (1883)	F5 tornado killed 37 and injured hundreds more. It led to the creation of the Mayo Clinic.
37–60	1887	1887 Hartford Railroad Disaster	Accident – railroad	Hartford, Vermont		
37	1948	Northwest Airlines Flight 421	Accident – aircraft	Fountain City, Wisconsin		
37	1961	Northwest Orient Airlines Flight 706	Accident – aircraft	Chicago, Illinois		
37	1966	Loss of MV Alva Cape	Accident – shipwreck	New York Harbor		33 people killed in first fire, four people killed in second fire several days later
37	1976	American Airlines Flight 625	Accident – aircraft	Saint Thomas, U.S. Virgin Islands		
37	1994	USAir Flight 1016	Accident – aircraft	Charlotte, North Carolina		
36	1819	USS Firebrand	Accident – shipwreck	Off Pass Christian, Mississippi		Wrecked at anchor during Bay St. Louis Hurricane of 1819
36	1846	USS Somers (1842)	Accident – shipwreck	Off Veracruz		Capsized due to a squall while chasing a blockade runner during the Mexican–American War
36–50	1887	SS Vernon	Accident – shipwreck	Lake Michigan		
36	1904	Missouri (BB-11) turret fire	Fire (ship)	Atlantic Ocean		
36	1918	1918 Tyler tornado	Tornado	Tyler, Minnesota		
36	1924	Babbs Switch fire	Fire (building)	Babbs Switch, Oklahoma	Financial damage not reported	Christmas tree lighted with candles accidentally caught fire and destroyed school building. 37 additional people injured.
36	1937	Hindenburg disaster	Accident – airship	Manchester, New Jersey		Hydrogen-filled zeppelin exploded while trying to dock.
36	2002	Tornado outbreak of November 9–11, 2002	Tornado outbreak	Eastern United States	$160,000,000	
36	2010	2010 Tennessee floods	Flood, tornado outbreak	Tennessee, Kentucky and Mississippi	$2,300,000,000 (2010)	Including five tornado deaths from a related tornado outbreak
36	2016	Ghost Ship warehouse fire	Fire (building)	Oakland, California		
35	1900	Camp Creek train wreck	Accident – railroad	McDonough, Georgia		
35+	1907	Naomi Mine explosion	Accident – coal mine	Fayette City, Pennsylvania		
35	1914	Francis H. Leggett	Accident – shipwreck	Off Columbia Bar, Oregon		
35	1919	J. A. Chanslor	Accident – shipwreck	Off Cape Blanco, Oregon		
35	1923	Allen Street Bridge disaster	Accident – bridge collapse	Cowlitz River, Washington		
35	1949	Standard Air Lines Flight 897R	Accident – aircraft	Chatsworth, California		
35	1969	Hawthorne Nevada Airlines Flight 708	Accident – aircraft	Lone Pine, California		
35	1980	Sunshine Skyway Bridge	Ship – collision	St. Petersburg, Florida		
35	1991	1991 Los Angeles airport runway collision	Accident – aircraft	Los Angeles, California		
35	2007	Tornado outbreak of February 28 – March 2, 2007	Tornado outbreak, blizzard	Central United States, Southern United States	$580,000,000	20 deaths from tornadoes, 15 deaths from blizzard; four other deaths occurred in Canada
35	2011	2011 Halloween nor'easter	Blizzard	Northeastern United States		Additional four deaths in Canada
34	1965	Watts Riots	Riot	Los Angeles, California	~$40,000,000	A riot began in the neighborhood of Watts, and other neighborhoods in South Central Los Angeles after a California Highway Patrol officer pulled over Marquette Frye and Ronald Frye, two African- American men, off the suspicion of driving while intoxicated. Thirty-four people were killed, and it is estimated that more than one thousand were injured.
34	1878	1878 Wallingford tornado	Tornado	Southern Connecticut	$5,300,000 (2007)	
34	1893	1893 New York hurricane	Tropical cyclone	Eastern United States		
34+	1916	1916 Gulf Coast hurricane	Tropical cyclone	Gulf Coast of the United States		
34	1920	1920 North Dakota blizzard	Winter storm	North Dakota		
34	1922	Roma (airship)	Accident – airship	Norfolk, Virginia		
34	1934	Kerns Hotel fire	Fire (building)	Lansing, Michigan		
34	1936	SS Iowa (1920)	Accident – shipwreck	Columbia Bar, Washington		
34	1943	USS Rogday (ID-3583)	Accident – shipwreck	Off South Carolina		
34	1945	Michigan train wreck	Accident – railroad	Michigan City, North Dakota		
34	1950	1950 Chicago streetcar crash	Accident – railroad	Chicago, Illinois		
34	1959	Braniff Flight 542	Accident – aircraft	Near Buffalo, Texas		
34	1960	National Airlines Flight 2511	Accident – aircraft	Near Bolivia, North Carolina		
34	1967	USS Liberty incident	Military strike - aircraft, torpedo boats	Mediterranean Sea		34 deaths on military ship USS Liberty due to the June 8, 1967, attack by Israeli Defense Force (IDF) aircraft and torpedo boats.
34	1967	Mohawk Airlines Flight 40	Accident – aircraft	Blossburg, Pennsylvania		
34	1980	Florida Commuter Airlines crash	Accident – aircraft	Atlantic Ocean, near West End, Bahamas		
34	2015	Hurricane Joaquin	Tropical cyclone, shipwreck	Southeastern United States, Bermuda, Cuba, The Caribbean	$200,000,000	Including 33 deaths from the sinking of SS El Faro near the Bahamas, and one other death on land.
34	2019	Sinking of MV Conception	Fire (dive boat)	Santa Cruz Island, California		
33	1858	Eliza Battle	Accident – shipwreck	Tombigbee River, Alabama		Fatalities estimated
33	1913	Alum Chine explosion	Accident – explosion	Patapsco River, near Baltimore, Maryland		
33	1925	USS S-51 (SS-162)	Accident – shipwreck	Near Block Island, Rhode Island		
33	1941	USS O-9 (SS-70)	Accident – shipwreck	Off Portsmouth, New Hampshire		
33	1952	National Airlines Flight 101	Accident – aircraft	Elizabeth, New Jersey		Last of three plane crashes in Elizabeth over three months
33	1958	SS Carl D. Bradley	Accident – shipwreck	Lake Michigan		
33	1960	May 1960 tornado outbreak sequence	Tornado outbreak sequence	Midwestern United States, Southern United States	$32,618,000	Including 16 deaths from a single tornado in southeastern Oklahoma
33	1973	Mississippi flood of 1973	Flood	Mississippi Valley		
33	1978	Tropical Storm Amelia (1978)	Tropical cyclone	Texas		
33	1996	Humberto Vidal explosion	Accident – explosion	Río Piedras, Puerto Rico		
33	2007	Virginia Tech shooting	mass murder – school shooting	Blacksburg, Virginia		Armed with two semi-automatic handguns, student Seung-Hui Cho shot to death 32 people in two separate attacks on the campus of Virginia Polytechnic Institute and State University. 23 other people were wounded, 17 by gunfire. Cho committed suicide.
33	2023	Tornado outbreak of March 31 – April 1, 2023	Tornado outbreak	Midwestern United States, Southern United States, Eastern United States		Including one indirect and six non-tornadic deaths
32–37	1920	Ocoee massacre	Mass racial violence	Orange County, Florida		
32–33	1858	John Milton (ship)	Accident – shipwreck	Off Long Island, New York		
32+	1868	Morning Star (1862 ship)	Accident – shipwreck	Lake Erie		At least 30 deaths aboard the Morning Star, and two deaths aboard the Cortland
32	1918	USS Cherokee (ID-458)	Accident – shipwreck	Off Fenwick Island, Delaware		Including two people who later died after being rescued by the British Admiral
32	1948	1948 Los Gatos DC-3 crash	Accident – aircraft	Diablo Range, west of Coalinga, California		
32	1948	1948 Airborne Transport DC-3 disappearance	Accident – aircraft	Atlantic Ocean, off east coast of Florida		Disappeared and was never recovered
32	1950	Rockville Centre train crash	Accident – railroad	Rockville Centre, New York		
32	1962	Tornado outbreak sequence of May 14–June 1, 1962	Tornado outbreak sequence			Most fatalities were due to lightning rather than tornadoes
32	1963	1963 Chualar bus crash	Accident – bus, train	Chualar, California		Deadliest road accident in U.S. history, and deadliest U.S. rail accident involving a grade crossing
32	1968	Northeast Airlines Flight 946	Accident – aircraft	Etna, New Hampshire		
32	1969	1969 Hazlehurst, Mississippi tornadoes	Tornado	Hazlehurst, Mississippi		
32	1973	UpStairs Lounge arson attack	mass murder – arson	New Orleans, Louisiana		Deadliest attack on a gay bar in the U.S. until 2016; still unsolved.
32	1994	Tropical Storm Alberto (1994)	Tropical cyclone	Georgia		
31	1853	Steamboat Jenny Lind	Accident – shipwreck	San Francisco Bay, California		
31	1855	Gasconade Bridge train disaster	Bridge – accident	Gasconade, Missouri		
31	1862	USS Weehawken (1862)	Accident – shipwreck	Morris Island, South Carolina		
31	1892	SS Western Reserve	Accident – shipwreck	Lake Superior		
31	1910	USS Nina	Accident – shipwreck	Off Ocean City, Maryland		
31	1913	1913 Binghamton Factory fire	Fire (building)	Binghamton, New York		
31	1940	Little Falls Gulf Curve crash of 1940	Accident – railroad	Little Falls, New York		An additional 51 were injured
31	1942	Tornado outbreak of May 2, 1942	Tornado outbreak	Central United States		Including 16 deaths from the McLoud–Chilesville, Oklahoma tornado
31	1959	Capital Airlines Flight 75	Accident – aircraft	Chase, Maryland		
31	1970	Wichita State University football team plane crash	Accident – aircraft	Clear Creek County, Colorado		
31	1981	Keansburg nursing home fire	Fire (building)	Keansburg, New Jersey		Nursing home full of elderly and mentally disabled
31	1983	SS Marine Electric	Accident – shipwreck	Off Virginia		
31	1985	Midwest Express Airlines Flight 105	Accident – aircraft	Milwaukee, Wisconsin		
31	1998	October 1998 Central Texas floods	Flood	Texas		
31	2009	2009 Samoa earthquake and tsunami	Tsunami	American Samoa and nearby islands		189 total deaths, with 31 in American Samoa.
31	2025	Tornado outbreak sequence of May 15–16, 2025	Tornado outbreak	Central United States, Ohio Valley		Including 19 deaths from the Somerset–London, Kentucky tornado; also including five non-tornadic deaths
30	1845	Great New York City Fire of 1845	Fire	New York City, New York		
30	1868	1868 Hayward earthquake	Earthquake	Hayward, California		
30	1887	Forest Hills disaster	Structural failure	Boston, Massachusetts		
30	1895	Osceola Mine	Accident – copper mine	Osceola Township, Houghton County, Michigan		
30–40	1833	St. Martin (steamboat)	Ship fire	Louisiana -Traveling from Bayou Sarah; burned about 2 miles (3.2 km) above Donaldsville		
30–38	1909	SS Marquette & Bessemer No. 2	Accident – shipwreck	Lake Erie		
30	1923	Glenrock train wreck	Accident – railroad	Meadow Acres, Wyoming		
30	1948	Northwest Airlines Flight 4422	Accident – aircraft	Mount Sanford, Alaska Territory		
30	1952	American Airlines Flight 6780	Accident – aircraft	Elizabeth, New Jersey		Second of three plane crashes in Elizabeth over three months
30	1955	American Airlines Flight 476	Accident – aircraft	Fort Leonard Wood, Missouri		
30	1956	Redondo Junction train wreck	Accident – railroad	Los Angeles, California		
30	1965	United Airlines Flight 389	Accident – aircraft	Lake Michigan, near Lake Forest, Illinois		
30	1982	Tornado outbreak of April 2–3, 1982	Tornado outbreak	Midwestern United States, Southern United States	$390,500,000	
30	1987	1987 Saragosa tornado	Tornado	Saragosa, Texas	$2,500,000	
30	1989	November 1989 tornado outbreak	Tornado outbreak	Southern United States, Eastern United States	$160,000,000 (2005)	21 deaths from the Huntsville, Alabama tornado; nine others from an event in Newburgh, New York variously described as either a tornado or a downburst
30	1997	1997 Central Texas tornado outbreak	Tornado outbreak	Central Texas	$126,600,000	All 27 tornadic deaths were from a single tornado in Jarrell; three other non-tornadic fatalities occurred
30	2004	Hurricane Charley	Tropical cyclone	Florida, Rhode Island		
30	2005	Hurricane Wilma	Tropical cyclone	Florida		
30	2013	Tornado outbreak of May 18–21, 2013	Tornado outbreak	Moore, Oklahoma		Including the Moore, Oklahoma tornado which killed 24; also including four non-tornadic and indirect deaths
30	2025	January 2025 Southern California wildfires	Wildfire	Southern California		Including 17 deaths from the Eaton Fire
30	2026	February 2026 North American blizzard	Winter storm	Northeastern United States		
29	1871	Great Revere Train Wreck of 1871	Accident – railroad	Revere, Massachusetts		
29	1910	SS Pere Marquette 18	Accident – shipwreck	Lake Michigan		Including two crew members of sister ship Pere Marquette 17
29–42	1910	Baudette fire of 1910	Wildfire	Beltrami County, Minnesota		
29	1920	SS Superior City	Accident – shipwreck	Lake Superior		Collided with SS Willis L. King
29	1933	1933 Griffith Park fire	Wildfire	Griffith Park, California		
29	1943	Lackawanna Limited wreck	Accident – railroad	Wayland, New York		Delaware, Lackawanna and Western Railroad passenger train sideswiped a freight train
29	1954	Hurricane Edna	Tropical cyclone	North Carolina, New England		
29	1964	Bonanza Air Lines Flight 114	Accident – aircraft	Near Sloan, Nevada		
29	1970	Pioneer Hotel (Tucson, Arizona)	Fire (building)	Tucson, Arizona		
29	1971	Thiokol-Woodbine explosion	Accident – explosion	Woodbine, Georgia		
29	1973	MV Norse Variant	Accident – shipwreck	Off New Jersey		
29	1975	Wreck of the SS Edmund Fitzgerald	Accident – shipwreck	Lake Superior		Deadliest disaster on the Great Lakes. Inspired hit song by Gordon Lightfoot
29	1976	Yuba City bus disaster	Accident – school bus	Martinez, California		
29	1977	Air Indiana Flight 216	Accident – aircraft	Evansville, Indiana		The University of Evansville basketball team was traveling to Middle Tennessee State University when the plane crashed 90 seconds after takeoff from Dress Regional Airport.
29	1990	1990 Plainfield tornado	Tornado	Plainfield, Illinois Crest Hill, Illinois	$160,000,000	
29	1997	Comair Flight 3272	Accident – aircraft	Raisinville Township, Michigan		
29	2006	Tornado outbreak of April 2, 2006	Tornado outbreak	Midwestern United States, Mississippi River Valley	$1,100,000,000	Including a single tornado in western Tennessee which killed 16; also including two non-tornadic deaths
29	2007	February 2007 North American blizzard	Blizzard	Midwestern United States, Eastern United States, Gulf Coast of the United States	$50,000,000	Including one death due to a tornado in New Orleans; at least seven other deaths also occurred in Canada
29	2010	Upper Big Branch Mine disaster	Accident – coal mine	Montcoal, West Virginia		
28	1850	Maine Insane Asylum fire	Building fire	Augusta, Maine		
28	1885	Rock Springs massacre	Mass racial violence	Wyoming Territory		
28	1913	Arcadia Hotel fire	Fire (building)	Boston, Massachusetts		
28	1927	Pittsburgh gasometer explosion	Accident – explosion	Pittsburgh, Pennsylvania		
28	1949	American Airlines Flight 157	Accident – aircraft	Dallas, Texas		
28	1951	Great Flood of 1951	Flood	Kansas, Missouri	$7,000,000,000 (2005)	
28	1953	American Airlines Flight 723	Accident – aircraft	Colonie, New York		
28	1958	Tornado outbreak of June 3–4, 1958	Tornado outbreak	Minnesota, Montana, Nebraska, Wisconsin	$83,275,000	Including 21 deaths from a tornado that struck Colfax, Wisconsin
28+	1959	1959 Hebgen Lake earthquake	Earthquake	Montana		
28	1961	Texas Tower 4	Structural collapse	Off the coast of Long Island, New York		USAF radar station which sunk due to the January 1961 nor'easter
28	1968	North Central Airlines Flight 458	Accident – aircraft	Chicago, Illinois		
28	1969	USS Enterprise fire	Accident – fire, explosion	Pacific Ocean, off Pearl Harbor, Hawaii		
28	1971	Allegheny Airlines Flight 485	Accident – aircraft	New Haven, Connecticut		
28	1977	Blizzard of 1977	Winter storm	New York		
28	1987	L'Ambiance Plaza collapse	Structural collapse	Bridgeport, Connecticut		
28	1987	Continental Airlines Flight 1713	Accident – aircraft	Denver, Colorado		
28	1998	January 1998 North American ice storm	Winter storm, flood	Eastern United States		Additional 28 deaths in Canada
28	2008	Tornado outbreak sequence of May 7–15, 2008	Tornado outbreak sequence	Southern Plains, Southeastern United States, Mid-Atlantic	$250,324,000	Including the Picher, Oklahoma/Neosho, Missouri tornado which killed 21 people; also including three non-tornadic deaths
28	2012	Sandy Hook Elementary School shooting	mass murder – school shooting	Sandy Hook, Connecticut		Adam Lanza shot and killed his mother, then drove to Sandy Hook Elementary School, where he fatally shot 20 students and 6 educators before committing suicide.
27	1850	South America (steamboat)	Boat fire	Near Morgan's Bend on the Mississippi River		Death toll included 13 U.S. Army soldiers, recruits assigned to the 3rd Infantry in the Southwest
27	1872	1872 Owens Valley earthquake	Earthquake	Owens Valley, California		
27	1947	West Frankfort, Illinois	Accident – coal mine	West Frankfort, Illinois		
27	1958	Prestonsburg, Kentucky bus disaster	Accident – school bus	Prestonsburg, Kentucky		
27	1962	Canadian Pacific Air Lines Flight 301	Accident – aircraft	Honolulu, Hawaii		
27	1984	Wilberg Mine	Accident – coal mine	Emery County, Utah		
27	1988	Carrollton bus collision	Accident – school bus	Carrollton, Kentucky		
27	1992	USAir Flight 405	Accident – aircraft	Flushing Bay, near Queens, New York		
27	1996	Hurricane Fran	Tropical cyclone	The Carolinas, the Virginias, Pennsylvania		
27	1997	March 1997 tornado outbreak	Tornado outbreak	Arkansas, Mississippi, Kentucky, and Tennessee	$115,000,000	Including a single tornado which killed 15 people near Little Rock, Arkansas
27	2003	North American blizzard of 2003	Winter storm	Rocky Mountains, Central United States, Eastern United States		
27	2013	Tornado outbreak of May 26–31, 2013	Tornado outbreak, flood	Oklahoma, Kansas, Missouri, Arkansas		9 tornadic deaths, 18 from flooding and other causes
27	2017	Sutherland Springs church shooting	Mass shooting	Sutherland Springs, Texas		26 murdered, gunman committed suicide after being mortally wounded by an armed civilian
27	2024	Tornado outbreak of May 25–27, 2024	Tornado outbreak sequence	Midwestern United States, Southern United States		Including two indirect and ten non-tornadic deaths
26	1863	SS Ada Hancock	Accident – shipwreck	San Pedro Bay, California		
26	1895	Front Street Theater disaster	Crowd crush	Baltimore, Maryland		
26	1905	Patapsco train collision	Accident – railroad	Patapsco, Carroll County, Maryland		Head-on collision between a freight train and passenger train.
26	1907	Canaan train wreck	Accident – train collision	Canaan, New Hampshire		Head-on collision between a freight train and passenger train.
26	1911	Canonsburg Opera House disaster	Stampede	Canonsburg, Pennsylvania		
26	1913	James T. Staples	Accident – explosion, shipwreck	Tombigbee River, near Coffeeville, Alabama		
26	1924	SS Clifton	Accident – shipwreck	Lake Huron		
26	1926	SS Papoose	Accident – shipwreck	Mississippi River		
26	1939	USS Sailfish (SS-192)	Accident – shipwreck	Off New Hampshire		
26	1951	Continental Charters Flight 44-2	Accident – aircraft	Near Napoli, New York		
26	1959	Piedmont Airlines Flight 349	Accident – aircraft	Albemarle County, Virginia		
26	1962	Hurricane Daisy (1962)	Tropical cyclone	New England		
26	1967	TWA Flight 553	Accident – aircraft	Concord Township, Champaign County, Ohio		
26	1967	1967 Newark riots	Riot	Newark, New Jersey	~$10,000,000	One of the deadliest riots of the long, hot summer of 1967. Incited by the arrest and beating of a Black cab driver, the riot resulted in 26 deaths, over 700 injuries, and about $10 million in damages.
26	1970	Tornado outbreak sequence of April 17–19, 1970	Tornado outbreak sequence	Midwestern United States, Southern United States		Including a tornado which killed 16 people in the Texas Panhandle
26	1970	Lubbock tornado	Tornado	Lubbock, Texas	$1,411,900,000 (2008)	F5 tornado killed 26 and wounded approximately 500
26	1976	Scotia Mine	Accident – coal mine	Oven Fork, Kentucky		
26	1980	Stouffer's Inn fire	Fire (building)	Harrison, New York		
26	1992	Tornado outbreak of November 1992	Tornado outbreak	Southeastern United States, Ohio Valley	$300,000,000	
26	2008	2008 Chatsworth train collision	Accident – railroad	Chatsworth, California		
26	2020	Tornado outbreak of March 2–3, 2020	Tornado outbreak	Tennessee, Alabama, Kentucky, Missouri	$1,606,000,000 (2020)	Including the Putnam County, Tennessee tornado which killed 19; also including one indirect fatality

== 15 to 25 deaths ==
Fatalities	Year	Article	Type	Location	Damage (US$)	Comments
25–40	1898	Hassler (vessel)	Accident – shipwreck	North of Eldred Rock, Alaska		
25	1913	SS Henry B. Smith	Accident – shipwreck	Lake Superior		The SS Henry B. Smith was taking iron ore from one side of Lake Superior to the other. The weather became below freezing with powerful storms which caused massive waves, which resulted in her sinking, killing all 25 crew members on the ship.
25	1916	SS James B. Colgate	Accident – shipwreck	Lake Erie		
25	1926	1926 Nassau hurricane	Tropical cyclone	Puerto Rico		
25	1926	1926 Louisiana hurricane	Tropical cyclone	Louisiana		
25	1929	SS Andaste	Accident – shipwreck	Lake Michigan		
25	1936	Johnstown flood of 1936	Flood	Johnstown, Pennsylvania area		
25	1940	Lovettsville air disaster	Accident – aircraft	Lovettsville, Virginia		
25	1946	Mount Tom B-17 crash	Accident – aircraft	Mount Tom, Massachusetts		
25	1956	1956 McDonald Chapel tornado	Tornado	Jefferson County, Alabama		
25	1958	Northeast Airlines Flight 258	Accident – aircraft	Nantucket Memorial Airport, Massachusetts		
25	1959	Allegheny Airlines Flight 371	Accident – aircraft	South Williamsport, Pennsylvania		
25	1962	Eastern Air Lines Flight 512	Accident – aircraft	New York City, New York		
25	1967	Dale's Penthouse fire	Fire (building)	Montgomery, Alabama		
25	1982	Dorothy Mae Apartments fire	mass murder – arson	Los Angeles, California		
25	1986	Grand Canyon Airlines Flight 6	Accident – aircraft	Grand Canyon National Park, Arizona		
25	1991	Hamlet chicken processing plant fire	Fire (building)	Hamlet, North Carolina		Workers trapped behind locked doors
25	1991	1991 Oakland firestorm	Wildfire (wildland–urban interface)	Oakland, California, and vicinity	$1,500,000,000	Burned 2,900 structures and 1,500 acres in Oakland Hills
25	2005	Evansville Tornado of November 2005	Tornado	Missouri, Indiana, Kentucky, Ohio	$92,000,000	7 tornadoes
25	2023	Tornado outbreak of March 24–27, 2023	Tornado outbreak	Mississippi, Alabama		Including 17 deaths in the Rolling Fork–Silver City tornado; also including two non-tornadic deaths in Missouri
24	1806	1806 Great Coastal hurricane	Tropical cyclone, shipwreck	East Coast of the United States		Including 21 deaths in the wreck of the Rose-in-Bloom off Barnegat Inlet, New Jersey, and three deaths in or offshore from North Carolina
24+	1854	Gazelle (1854 sidewheeler)	Accident – explosion	Canemah, Oregon		
24	1881	1881 Minnesota tornado outbreak	Tornado outbreak	Southern Minnesota		Including 20 deaths from a single tornado
24–25	1901	SS Hudson (1887)	Accident – shipwreck	Off Eagle Harbor, Michigan		
24	1905	Red Ash Mine disasters	Accident – coal mine	Fire Creek, West Virginia		Two explosions over two days killed a total of 24 people
24	1908	SS D.M. Clemson	Accident – shipwreck	Lake Superior		
24–25	1916	Big Barren Creek flood	Accident – dam failure	Claiborne County, Tennessee		
24	1924	Hope Development School fire	Fire (building)	Playa Del Rey, California		
24	1939	1939 City of San Francisco derailment	Accident – railroad	Harney, Nevada		
24	1944	American Airlines Flight 2	Accident – aircraft	Mississippi River		
24	1958	Monarch Underwear Company fire	Fire (building)	New York City, New York		
24	1974	Gulliver's nightclub fire	mass murder – arson	Port Chester, New York		
24	1980	Hurricane Allen	Tropical cyclone	Texas, Louisiana		7 deaths in Texas, 17 offshore deaths in Louisiana
24	1991	Luby's shooting	mass murder	Killeen, Texas		23 murdered, gunman committed suicide
24	1994	Green Ramp disaster	Accident – aircraft	Fayetteville, North Carolina		Deadliest aircraft accident in the U.S. involving victims on the ground
24	1995	1995 Alaska Boeing E-3 Sentry accident	Accident – aircraft	Elmendorf Air Force Base, Alaska		
24	2002	North Carolina ice storm of 2002	Winter storm	North Carolina		
24	2015	October 2015 North American storm complex	Extratropical cyclone	Eastern United States		Additional death in New Brunswick
24	2025	Tornado outbreak and floods of April 2–7, 2025	Tornado outbreak, flood	Midwestern United States, Southern United States		8 deaths due to tornadoes, 16 from other causes
23	1689	Raid on Dover	Massacre	Dover, New Hampshire		The Pennacook Indians attacked the residents of Dover.
23	1874	Granite Mill fire	Fire (building)	Fall River, Massachusetts		
23	1891	Railway accident on the Bostian Bridge	Accident – railroad	Statesville, North Carolina		
23	1887	Forest Hills disaster	Accident – bridge collapse	Boston, Massachusetts		Attributed to a faulty bridge design.
23	1900	Thanksgiving Day Disaster	Structural collapse	San Francisco, California		Deadliest sporting event accident in US history
23	1919	Onawa train wreck	Accident – railroad	Onawa, Maine		
23	1923	Honda Point disaster	Accident – shipwreck	Near Lompoc, California		20 deaths aboard USS Young, three deaths aboard USS Delphy
23	1925	M.E. Norman	Accident – shipwreck	Mississippi River		
23	1929	Sneed Tornado	Tornado	Sneed, Arkansas		
23–25	1933	1933 Outer Banks hurricane	Tropical cyclone	North Carolina, Virginia		Two people went missing in Maine
23	1950	USS Benevolence	Accident – shipwreck	Off San Francisco, California		
23	1959	Meldrim, Georgia, trestle disaster	Explosion – fire	Meldrim, Georgia		
23	1961	Tornado outbreak sequence of May 3–9, 1961	Tornado outbreak sequence	Great Plains, Mississippi Valley, Midwest, Northeastern, Mid-Atlantic, and Southeastern United States	$42,205,000	Including 16 deaths from a tornado in Le Flore County, Oklahoma
23	1962	New York Telephone Company building explosion	Accident – explosion	New York City, New York		
23	1965	USAF KC-135 Wichita crash	Accident – aircraft	Wichita, Kansas		
23	1968	Los Angeles Airways Flight 841	Accident – aircraft	Paramount, California		
23	1970	ALM Flight 980	Accident – aircraft	Caribbean Sea, off Saint Croix		
23	1970	Hurricane Celia	Tropical cyclone	Texas, Florida		
23	1970	Tropical Storm Norma (1970)	Tropical cyclone, flood	Arizona		
23	1976	Wincrest Nursing Home fire	Arson	Chicago, Illinois		
23	1977	Great Lakes Blizzard of 1977	Blizzard	New York, Ontario	$56,250,000 (1977)	The brunt of the blizzard was centered around Buffalo.
23	1980	USCGC Blackthorn	Accident – shipwreck	Tampa Bay, Florida		
23	1983	Air Canada Flight 797	Accident – aircraft	Cincinnati, Ohio		
23	1984	San Ysidro McDonald's massacre	Mass shooting, hostage taking	San Ysidro, California		James Huberty entered a McDonald's armed with multiple Firearms, and shot dead 21 people, including a pregnant woman, before being killed by police.
23	1989	Phillips disaster	Accident – explosion	Pasadena, Texas	$1,415,000,000 (1990)	314 people injured
23	1991	Atlantic Southeast Airlines Flight 2311	Accident – aircraft	Brunswick, Georgia		
23+	2016	2016 West Virginia flood	Flood	West Virginia and Virginia		
23	2019	Tornado outbreak of March 3, 2019	Tornado	Alabama and Georgia		All 23 fatalities due to a single tornado; 3 of the deaths were children
23	2019	2019 El Paso shooting	Mass shooting	El Paso, Texas		
23	2021	February 15–20, 2021 North American winter storm	Winter storm	Contiguous United States		Additional six deaths in Mexico
23–25	2020	August 2020 California lightning wildfires	Wildfire	California		Including 16 deaths from the North Complex Fire
23	2022	Hurricane Fiona	Tropical cyclone	Puerto Rico		
22+	1821	1821 Norfolk and Long Island hurricane	Tropical cyclone	East Coast of the United States		
22+	1861	Kentucky (steamboat)	Boiler explosion	Mississippi River near Helena, Arkansas		
22	1865	1865 Viroqua tornado	Tornado	Viroqua, Wisconsin		
22	1867	Kingstree jail fire	Fire (building)	Kingstree, South Carolina		
22	1893	Ford's Theatre	Structural collapse	Washington, D.C.		
22	1895	SS Chicora	Accident – shipwreck	Lake Michigan		
22	1907	SS Cyprus	Accident – shipwreck	Lake Superior		
22	1903	United States Cartridge Company explosion	Accident – explosion	Lowell, Massachusetts		
22	1929	Study Club fire	Fire (building)	Detroit, Michigan		
22	1942	TWA Flight 3	Accident – aircraft	Potosi Mountain, southwest of Las Vegas, Nevada		Among those killed were actress Carole Lombard and her mother, who were returning to Los Angeles after a war bond drive in their home state of Indiana.
22	1953	Mid–March 1953 tornado outbreak	Tornado outbreak	Great Plains, Mississippi Valley, Southeastern United States	$6,835,000	Including 17 deaths from a tornado in northern Texas
22	1956	TWA Flight 400	Accident – aircraft	Moon Township, Pennsylvania		
22	1959	St. Louis tornado outbreak of February 1959	Tornado outbreak	Great Plains, Midwestern United States, Southeastern United States	$53,713,000	21 deaths from a single tornado in St. Louis, Missouri, and one death from flooding
22	1959	Hurricane Gracie	Tropical cyclone, tornado outbreak	Georgia, South Carolina, Virginia		Including 12 deaths from a tornado outbreak in Virginia
22	1960	Cal Poly football team plane crash	Accident – aircraft	Toledo, Ohio		
22	1963	Hotel Roosevelt fire	Fire (building)	Jacksonville, Florida		
22	1972	1972 Sacramento Canadair Sabre accident	Accident – aircraft	Sacramento, California		
22	1974	Tornado outbreak of June 8, 1974	Tornado outbreak	Midwestern United States, Southern United States		
22	1979	Hurricane David	Tropical cyclone	Puerto Rico, East Coast of the United States		
22	1980		Accident – tour bus	Jasper, Arkansas		
22	1991	1991 Halloween blizzard	Winter storm	Central United States		
22	1999	Mother's Day bus crash	Accident –charter bus	New Orleans, Louisiana		
22	2012	June 2012 North American derecho	Derecho	Midwestern United States, Mid-Atlantic United States		
22	2014	February 2014 nor'easter	Winter storm	Eastern United States		
22	2015	Hurricane Linda (2015)	Tropical cyclone	Utah, California		
22	2017	Tornado outbreak of January 21–23, 2017	Tornado outbreak	Southeastern United States, Northeastern United States	$1,300,000,000 (2017)	Including two non-tornadic deaths
22	2018	January 2018 North American blizzard	Blizzard	Eastern United States		
22	2022	Robb Elementary School shooting	Mass shooting – school shooting	Uvalde, Texas		Including the perpetrator
22	2023	2022–2023 California floods	Flood, winter storm	California		
22	2025	June 2025 United States floods	Flood	San Antonio, Texas and Ohio County, West Virginia		A single storm system caused at least thirteen deaths in the San Antonio area and nine deaths in Ohio County, West Virginia, all from flooding.
21+	1889	Alaskan	Accident – shipwreck	Oregon		
21	1846	1846 Grenada, Mississippi tornado	Tornado	Yalobusha County, Mississippi		
21	1887	Old Southern Hotel fire	Fire (building)	St. Louis, Missouri		
21	1903	1903 East Paris train wreck	Accident – railroad	Kentwood, Michigan		
21	1905	20th Century Limited derailment	Accident – railroad	Mentor, Ohio		
21	1910	Los Angeles Times bombing	Bombing	Los Angeles, California		
21	1910	Chicago Union Stock Yards fire	Fire, structural failure	Chicago, Illinois		
21	1915	USS F-4	Accident – shipwreck	Off Honolulu, Hawaii		
21	1915	St. Johns School fire	Fire (building)	Peabody, Massachusetts		Schoolgirls trapped behind exit door; resulted in first city law requiring that exit doors open outward
21	1919	Great Molasses Flood	Accident – explosion	Boston, Massachusetts	$6,600,000,000 (2005)	Damages are out-of-court settlements only; repairs took 133 man-months
21	1938	1938 Rodessa, Louisiana tornado	Tornado	Rodessa, Louisiana		
21	1953	1953 New York Central Railroad accident	Accident – railroad	Conneaut, Ohio		
21	1957	Early-April 1957 tornado outbreak sequence	Tornado outbreak sequence	Central United States, Eastern United States	$9,500,000	
21	1959	Arkansas Negro Boys' Industrial School	Fire (building)	Wrightsville, Arkansas		
21	1968	Los Angeles Airways Flight 417	Accident – aircraft	Compton, California		
21	1983	Hurricane Alicia	Tropical cyclone	Texas		
21	1986	Walker River bus crash	Accident – tour bus	Walker, California		
21	1987	February 1987 nor'easter	Winter storm, shipwrecks	Mid-Atlantic United States		18 deaths on MV Balsa 24, and 3 deaths on the Delores Marie
21	1989	Alton, Texas bus crash	Motor vehicle accident	Alton, Texas		
21	1991	Andover tornado outbreak	Tornado outbreak	Great Plains	$250,000,000	Including one tornado which killed 17 people near Andover, Kansas
21	2003	Air Midwest Flight 5481	Accident – aircraft	Charlotte, North Carolina		
21	2003	E2 nightclub stampede	Stampede	Chicago, Illinois		
21	2007	2007 Groundhog Day tornado outbreak	Tornado outbreak	Central Florida	$218,000,000	
21	2007	Tropical Storm Erin (2007)	Tropical cyclone	Texas, Oklahoma, Missouri		
21	2008	Tropical Storm Fay (2008)	Tropical cyclone	Puerto Rico, Southeastern United States		
21	2009	2009 North American Christmas blizzard	Winter storm	Midwest, Great Plains, Eastern United States		
21	2014	Early 2014 North American cold wave	Cold wave	Central United States, Eastern United States		
21–23	2018	2018 Southern California mudflows	Debris flow	Southern California		163 injured. 65 residences destroyed, 462 residences damaged, 8 commercial buildings destroyed, 20 commercial buildings damaged
20–30	1825	S. B. Teche	Steamboat explosion and fire	Mississippi River near Concordia Parish, Louisiana		
20	1860	USCS Robert J. Walker (1844)	Accident – shipwreck	Off New Jersey		
20	1872	Great Boston Fire of 1872	Fire (urban conflagration)	Boston, Massachusetts	$73,500,000 (1872)	
20	1874	Chicago Fire of 1874	Fire (urban conflagration)	Chicago, Illinois		
20+	1881	Tornado outbreak of June 1881	Tornado outbreak	West North Central States		
20	1882	SS Escambia	Accident – shipwreck	San Francisco, California		
20	1890	1890 Quincy train wreck	Accident – railroad	Quincy, Massachusetts		
20–24	1907	Standard Steel Car Company mill explosion	Accident - Explosion	Butler, Pennsylvania	$100,000 (1907)	
20	1907	Woodlawn derailment	Accident – railroad	Woodlawn, The Bronx, New York City		The day after the New York Central Railroad inaugurated electrical train service in New York City and suburban Westchester County, an electric engine (which had a higher center of mass than the old steam engines) jumped the tracks on a curve leading into Woodlawn station. Wreckage was strewn over a mile (1.6 km) with 20 dead and 150 injured.
20	1916	SS S.R. Kirby	Accident – shipwreck	Off Eagle Harbor, Michigan		
20	1916	1916 Texas hurricane	Tropical cyclone	Texas		
20	1924	1924 Nixon Nitration Works disaster	Accident – explosion	Nixon, New Jersey		
20	1928	Preble Box Toe Company explosion	Accident – explosion	Lynn, Massachusetts		
20	1943	American Airlines Flight 63 (Flagship Ohio)	Accident – aircraft	Allen County, Kentucky		
20	1948	1948 Donora smog	Smog	Donora, Pennsylvania		U.S. Steel's Donora Zinc Works and the American Steel & Wire plant's emissions were believed to be the cause of the intense air pollution over this small mill town.
20	1957	Northeast Airlines Flight 823	Accident – aircraft	Queens, New York		
20	1968	Allegheny Airlines Flight 736	Accident – aircraft	Bradford, Pennsylvania		
20+	1969	December 1969 nor'easter	Winter storm	Northeastern United States		
20	1976	Pathfinder Hotel explosion	Accident - explosion	Fremont, Nebraska		
20	1978	Coates House Hotel	Fire (building)	Kansas City, Missouri		
20	1999	Jasper, Arkansas bus crash	Accident – tour bus	New Orleans, Louisiana		Plunged over embankment, carrying senior citizens from casino
20	2005	Ethan Allen boating accident	Accident – shipwreck	Lake George (New York)		Overloaded tour boat capsized from another boat's wake.
20	2005	Chalk's Ocean Airways Flight 101	Accident – aircraft	Off Miami Beach, Florida		
20	2008	Tornado outbreak sequence of June 3–11, 2008	Tornado outbreak sequence, flood	Central United States, Eastern United States	$146,900,000	7 tornado deaths, 13 from other events (see also June 2008 Midwest floods)
20	2010	June 2010 Arkansas floods	Flood	Albert Pike Recreation Area near Langley, Arkansas		
20	2011	2011 Mississippi River floods	Flood	Mississippi River Valley		
20	2017	Tornado outbreak and floods of April 28 – May 1, 2017	Tornado outbreak, flood	High Plains, Western United States (Rocky Mountains), Ohio Valley, Upper Midwest, Southeastern United States		5 deaths from tornadoes, 15 from other causes
20	2018	Schoharie limousine crash	Motor vehicle accident	Schoharie, New York		Stretch limo ran a stop sign on a three-way intersection, killing all 18 inside and two people in a parking lot
20	2021	2021 Tennessee floods	Flood	Middle Tennessee		
19+	2020	George Floyd protests	Riot	Minneapolis, Minnesota, Various cities in the United States	~$1,500,000,000 - $2,500,000,000	Widespread protests and riots across the United States after the murder of George Floyd. Amid clashes with law enforcement and widespread looting, many criminals were emboldened. At least 12 people were fatally shot, while two others were killed by vehicles.
19	1863	CSS Chattahoochee	Accident – shipwreck	Apalachicola River		
19	1871	Los Angeles Chinese massacre of 1871	Mass racial violence	Old Chinatown, Los Angeles, California		
19	1878	Wollaston disaster	Accident – railroad	Quincy, Massachusetts		
19	1888	SS City of Chester	Accident – shipwreck	Golden Gate, California		
19	1897	Garrison train crash	Accident – railroad	Garrison, New York		
19	1908	Great Chelsea fire of 1908	Fire (urban conflagration)	Chelsea, Massachusetts		
19	1917	USS F-1	Accident – shipwreck	Off Point Loma, San Diego, California		
19	1924	Palmertown muck dam disaster	Industrial accident	Near Saltville, Virginia		
19	1926	Picatinny Arsenal fire	Accident – lightning strike	Morris County, New Jersey		
19	1943	Pan Am Flight 1104	Accident – aircraft	Mendocino County, California		
19	1943	1943 Surprise Hurricane	Tropical cyclone	Louisiana, Texas		
19	1944	Long Creek air disaster	Accident – aircraft	South Portland, Maine		
19	1944	US Army C-47 crash	Accident – aircraft	Mount Deception (Alaska)		
19	1950	1950 Fairfield-Suisun Boeing B-29 crash	Accident – aircraft	Fairfield-Suisun Air Force Base, California		
19	1953	BCPA Flight 304	Accident – aircraft	Near Woodside, California		
19	1956	McKee refinery fire	Fire (industrial)	Near Sunray, Texas		
19	1957	Tornado outbreak sequence of December 18–20, 1957	Tornado outbreak sequence	Midwestern United States, Southern United States		
19	1962	Tornado outbreak of March 30–31, 1962	Tornado outbreak	Southeastern United States	$3,380,000	Including 17 deaths from a single tornado in Milton, Florida and two lightning deaths
19	1964	Christmas flood of 1964	Flood	Pacific Northwest		
19	1969	Prinair Flight 277	Accident – aircraft	Fajardo, Puerto Rico		
19	1970	Tropical Depression Fifteen (1970)	Tropical cyclone	Puerto Rico, U.S. Virgin Islands		
19	1974	1974 Blythe, California bus crash	Accident – bus	Ripley, California		
19	1992	December 1992 nor'easter	Winter storm	Northeastern United States		
19	1996	Hurricane Hortense	Tropical cyclone	Puerto Rico		
19	2000	2000 Marana V-22 crash	Accident – aircraft	Near Tucson, Arizona		
19	2000	2000 East Coast Aviation Services British Aerospace Jetstream crash	Accident – aircraft	Wilkes-Barre, Pennsylvania		
19	2000	USS Cole bombing	Terrorism	Aden, Yemen		Including the two perpetrators
19	2013	Yarnell Hill Fire	Wildfire	Yarnell, Arizona		19 firefighters were killed when they became trapped in the fast-spreading fire.
19	2023	2023 Lewiston shootings	Mass shooting	Lewiston, Maine		Including the perpetrator
19	2025	February 2025 North American storm complex	Flood	Kentucky, West Virginia, Georgia		
18	1878	Great Mill Disaster	Accident - grain dust explosion	Minneapolis, Minnesota		
18	1887		Accident - mine explosion	Savanna, Oklahoma (then Choctaw Nation in Indian Territory)		Explosions in Savanna Coal Mining and Trading Company Mines #1 and #2 killed 6 miners and 12 rescuers.
18	1892	SS W.H. Gilcher	Accident – shipwreck	Lake Michigan		
18	1911	Indianola train wreck	Accident – railroad	Indianola, Nebraska		
18	1928	1928 Times Square derailment	Accident – railroad	New York City, New York		
18	1947	Eastern Air Lines Flight 665	Accident – aircraft	Galax, Virginia		
18	1947	Pan Am Flight 923	Accident – aircraft	Annette Island, Alaska Territory		
18	1960	1960 Texas tropical storm	Tropical cyclone	Texas, Arkansas		
18	1961	United Airlines Flight 859	Accident – aircraft	Denver, Colorado		
18	1966	Tornado outbreak sequence of June 1966	Tornado outbreak sequence	Southern United States, Midwestern United States, Great Plains	$250,603,000	Including 16 deaths from a single tornado in Topeka, Kansas
18	1966	University of Texas massacre	mass murder – school shooting	Austin, Texas		Including the perpetrator and an unborn child
18	1966	West Coast Airlines Flight 956	Accident – aircraft	Clackamas County, Oregon		
18	1993	Northwest Airlink Flight 5719	Accident – aircraft	Hibbing, Minnesota		
18	2000	Tornado outbreak of February 13–14, 2000	Tornado outbreak	Southeastern United States		
18	2001	2001 Avjet Gulfstream III crash	Accident – aircraft	Pitkin County, Colorado		
18	2006	Hanukkah Eve windstorm of 2006	Extratropical cyclone	Washington, Oregon		
18	2007	2007 Midwest flooding	Flood	Midwestern United States		
18	2011	Tropical Storm Lee (2011)	Tropical cyclone	Gulf Coast of the United States, Eastern United States		
18	2013	Early February 2013 North American blizzard	Blizzard	Eastern United States		
18	2015	Tornado outbreak of December 23–25, 2015	Tornado outbreak	Mississippi, Tennessee, Indiana, Illinois, Alabama	$1,606,000,000 (2020)	Including five non-tornadic deaths
17–20	1861	Platte Bridge Railroad Tragedy	Accident – railroad	St. Joseph, Missouri		
17	1898	SS L.R. Doty	Accident – shipwreck	Lake Michigan		
17	1903	Purdue Wreck	Accident – railroad	Indianapolis, Indiana		
17	1847	Ohio River flood	Flood; building collapse	Utopia, Ohio		
17	1905	Baker Bridge train wreck	Accident – railroad	Lincoln, Massachusetts		
17	1910	Morewood Lake Ice Company explosion	Accident – explosion	Pittsfield, Massachusetts		
17	1919	SS Myron	Accident – shipwreck	Lake Superior		
17–35+	1923	Allen Street Bridge disaster	Accident – collapse	Cowlitz River, Washington		Fatalities estimated
17	1936	American Airlines Flight 1 (1936)	Accident – aircraft	Near Goodwin, Arkansas		
17	1944	USS YF-415	Accident – shipwreck	Hingham, Massachusetts		Including one person who died of his injuries after being rescued
17	1945	Lacoste Babies Home fire	Fire (building)	Auburn, Maine		
17	1947	O'Connor Plating Works disaster	Accident – explosion	Los Angeles, California		
17	1950	Hurricane Dog (1950)	Tropical cyclone	East Coast of the United States		Including three deaths in a car accident in Bel Air, Maryland, two drowning deaths in Lexington, Virginia, and 12 deaths in New England
17	1951	Great Flood of 1951	Flood	Kansas, Missouri		
17	1951	Hurricane How	Tropical cyclone, shipwreck	Cape Hatteras, North Carolina		17 people were killed in the wreck of the Southern Isle
17	1953	SS Henry Steinbrenner	Accident – shipwreck	Lake Superior		
17	1954	Hurricane Alice (June 1954)	Tropical cyclone	Texas		
17	1962	United Airlines Flight 297	Accident – aircraft	Near Ellicott City, Maryland		
17	1965	Pipeline explosion and fire	Accidents – pipeline accidents	Natchitoches, Louisiana		
17	1965	Early May 1965 tornado outbreak	Tornado outbreak	Great Plains, Midwestern United States	$51,000,000	
17	1968	USCGC White Alder (WLM-541)	Accident – shipwreck	Mississippi River, near White Castle, Louisiana		
17	1972	Mohawk Airlines Flight 405	Accident – aircraft	Albany, New York		
17	1979	Downeast Flight 46	Accident – aircraft	Rockland, Maine		
17	1984	1984 Romeoville petroleum refinery disaster	Accident – explosion	Romeoville, Illinois		
17	1990	1990 ARCO explosion	Accident – explosion	Channelview, Texas		
17	1991	Interstate 5 dust storm accident	Accident – automobile	Coalinga, California		
17	2002	Beltway sniper attacks	mass murder serial killings	Washington metropolitan area		3 injured in the Beltway sniper attacks and 7 in preliminary shootings
17	2004	December 21–24, 2004 North American winter storm	Winter storm	South Central United States, Ohio Valley		Additional death in Canada
17	2005	Los Angeles County flood of 2005	Flood	Los Angeles County, California		Including 10 deaths in the La Conchita landslide
17	2007	October 2007 California wildfires	Wildfire	Southern California		
17	2008	Early Spring 2008 Midwest floods	Flood	Central United States		
17	2008	Sherman, Texas bus accident	Accident – bus	Sherman, Texas		
17	2018	Stoneman Douglas High School shooting	School shooting	Parkland, Florida		Former student Nikolas Cruz, was dropped off by an Uber car to Stoneman Douglas High School, shot and killed 14 students and 3 staff members, left the scene and was later arrested in Coral Springs.
17	2018	Table Rock Lake duck boat accident	Accident – shipwreck	Branson, Missouri		
17	2022	2022 Bronx apartment fire	Fire (building)	The Bronx, New York City, New York		
17	2024	Hurricane Debby	Tropical cyclone	East Coast of the United States		
16	1804	1804 New England hurricane	Tropical cyclone	New England		
16	1833	Lioness (steamship)	Accident – explosion, shipwreck	Red River of the South near Colfax, Louisiana		
16	1862	USS Monitor	Accident – shipwreck	Off Cape Hatteras, North Carolina		
16	1890	1890 Wilkes-Barre tornado	Tornado	Wilkes-Barre, Pennsylvania		
16	1905	SS Kaliyuga	Accident – shipwreck	Lake Huron		
16–20	1914	SS Benjamin Noble	Accident – shipwreck	Near Knife River, Minnesota		
16	1926	La Plata tornado of 1926	Tornado	La Plata, Maryland		13 killed in La Plata Elementary School
16	1947	Great Fires of 1947	Wildfires	Maine		
16	1955	TWA Flight 260	Accident – aircraft	Bernalillo County, New Mexico		
16	1956	Hurricane Betsy (1956)	Tropical cyclone	Puerto Rico		
16	1956	Lariat Cafe explosion	Accident – explosion	Monticello, Utah		
16	1967	Hurricane Beulah	Tropical cyclone	Puerto Rico, Texas		
16	1970	Laguna Fire	Wildfire	Laguna Mountains, California		
16	1978	Waverly, Tennessee, tank car explosion	Accident – railroad	Waverly, Tennessee		An additional 43 injured
16	1978	1978 Whippoorwill tornado	Tornado, shipwreck	Pomona Lake, Kansas		Tornado struck a tourist boat, causing it to capsize
16	1987	1987 Maryland train collision	Accident – railroad	Chase, Maryland		
16	1987	The Dover massacre	mass murder spree killer	Dover, Arkansas – Russellville, Arkansas		
16	1991	Hurricane Bob	Tropical cyclone	East Coast of the United States		
16	1999	Columbine High School massacre	mass murder – school shooting	Jefferson County, Colorado		Armed with 2 sawed-off shotguns, a TEC-9 pistol and a carbine, Eric Harris and Dylan Klebold entered their school in Littleton and opened fire at the students and staff, killing 12 students, 1 teacher and then killing themselves. In February 2025, Anne Marie Hochhalter died due to wounds sustained during the shooting.
16	2006	2006 Mid-Atlantic United States flood	Flood	Mid-Atlantic United States		
16	2012	Late December 2012 North American storm complex	Tornado outbreak, blizzard	Alaska, Contiguous United States	$150,000,000	
16	2015	2015 Texas–Oklahoma flood and tornado outbreak	Tornado outbreak, flood	Great Plains, Southern United States		Additional 14 deaths occurred in Mexico
16	2015	2015 San Bernardino attack	Terrorism	San Bernardino, California		An additional 24 injured
16	2016	2016 Lockhart hot air balloon crash	Accident – hot air balloon	Lockhart, Texas		Deadliest ballooning disaster in U.S. history
16–19	2017	March 2017 North American blizzard	Blizzard	Northeastern United States, Upper Midwest, Great Plains		
16	2017	2017 United States Marine Corps KC-130 crash	Accident – aircraft	Leflore County, Mississippi		
16	2019	Tornado outbreak of December 16–17, 2019	Tornado outbreak, winter storm	Southeastern United States	$32,500,000	Three tornadic deaths and 13 winter storm deaths
16	2021	Tornado outbreak sequence of March 24–28, 2021	Tornado outbreak sequence	Southeastern United States	$3,200,000,000	Including one indirect and eight non-tornadic deaths
16	2025	2025 Accurate Energetic Systems explosion	Accident – explosion	Hickman County, Tennessee		
15–39+	1860	H. R. W. Hill steamboat explosion	Accident – explosion	Near Baton Rouge, Louisiana		
15	1815	1815 North Carolina hurricane	Tropical cyclone	North Carolina		
15	1881	City of Muskegon	Accident – shipwreck	Lake Michigan		
15	1883	1883 Tehachapi train wreck	Accident – railroad	Tehachapi, California		
15	1885	Sullivan Printing Company Fire	Fire (building)	Cincinnati, Ohio		15 people, mostly young women, were killed when they were trapped on an upper floor
15	1892	Mare Island Naval Yard explosion	Accident – explosion	Vallejo, California		15 sailors from USS Boston (1884) killed in black-powder explosion
15	1902	Park Avenue main line	Accident – railroad	New York City, New York		
15	1917	1917 Nueva Gerona hurricane	Tropical cyclone	Louisiana, Florida		10 in Louisiana, 5 in Florida
15	1936	MV Material Service	Accident – shipwreck	Lake Michigan		
15	1937	Blackwater Fire of 1937	Wildfire	Shoshone National Forest, Wyoming		
15	1948	1948 Columbia River flood	Flood	Vanport, Oregon		
15	1950	Northwest Orient Airlines Flight 307	Accident – aircraft	Minneapolis, Minnesota		
15	1953	Rattlesnake Fire	Wildfire	Mendocino National Forest, California		
15	1954	Cleveland Hill Middle School fire	Fire (building)	Cheektowaga, New York		
15	1955	1955 Cincinnati mid-air collision	Accident – aircraft	Boone County, Kentucky		
15	1956	Hurricane Flossy (1956)	Tropical cyclone	Gulf Coast of the United States, East Coast of the United States		
15	1958	Westover Air Force Base KC-135 crash	Accident – aircraft	Chicopee, Massachusetts		
15	1969	Scandinavian Airlines System Flight 933	Accident – aircraft	Santa Monica Bay, near Los Angeles, California		
15	1969	Tornado outbreak of August 6, 1969	Tornado outbreak	Minnesota, Nebraska	$4,270,000	
15	1984	Beverly rooming house fire	Arson	Beverly, Massachusetts		
15	1986	Edmond post office shooting	mass murder	Edmond, Oklahoma		14 victims and 1 perpetrator
15	1994	Flagship Airlines Flight 3379	Accident – aircraft	Morrisville, North Carolina		
15	2003	Cedar Fire	Wildfire	San Diego County, California		Burned 273,246 acres and 2,820 structures
15	2005	Texas City refinery explosion	Accident – explosion	Texas City, Texas		
15	2005	Hurricane Dennis	Tropical cyclone	Florida, Alabama, Mississippi		
15	2009	Tornado outbreak of February 10–11, 2009	Tornado outbreak	Central United States, Eastern United States	$18,100,000	Including seven non-tornadic deaths
15	2011	World Wide Tours bus crash	Accident – tour bus	Bronx, New York		En route to Connecticut casino, March 12
15	2012	2012 Leap Day tornado outbreak	Tornado outbreak	Great Plains, Ohio Valley	$475,000,000	
15	2013	West Fertilizer Company explosion	Accident – explosion	West, Texas		More than 160 people were injured. Several years later, investigators concluded that the fire that preceded the explosion had been deliberately set.
15	2020	Hurricane Isaias	Tropical cyclone	East Coast of the United States, Puerto Rico		
15	2023	February 2023 North American storm complex	Winter storm, tornado outbreak	East Coast of the United States, Puerto Rico	Western, Southern and Midwestern United States	
15	2025	2025 New Orleans truck attack	Vehicle-ramming attack, possible terrorism	New Orleans, Louisiana		14 people were killed when Shamsud-Din Jabbar, the perpetrator, rammed into a crowd of pedestrians in New Orleans on Bourbon Street. He was later shot and killed by local police.
15	2025	UPS Airlines Flight 2976	Accident – aircraft	Louisville, Kentucky		

== See also ==
=== By type ===
- List of missing ships
- List of boiler explosions
- List of Indian massacres in North America
- List of incidents of civil unrest in the United States
- List of battles with most United States military fatalities
- List of hotel fires in the United States
- List of the deadliest firefighter disasters in the United States
- Freedmen massacres
- List of notable disease outbreaks in the United States

=== By location ===
- List of disasters in New York City by death toll
- List of disasters in Massachusetts by death toll
- List of disasters in Maine by death toll
- List of disasters in New Hampshire by death toll
- List of disasters in Canada by death toll
- List of disasters in Germany by death toll
- List of disasters in Great Britain and Ireland by death toll
- List of disasters in Australia by death toll
- List of disasters in New Zealand by death toll
