= Red Ash Mine disasters =

Two deadly mine disasters in Fire Creek, West Virginia

The Red Ash Mine disasters were two deadly mine disasters that occurred at the Red Ash mine in Fire Creek, West Virginia, on March 6, 1900, and on March 18, 1905.

The first disaster was a result of a worker accidentally leaving a ventilating trap door open, resulting in a buildup of methane. It is believed that their coal lights ignited the methane and blasting powder kegs, which caused a severe explosion that killed 46 men and boys, most of whom suffocated from carbon monoxide inhalation.

The second disaster resulted from a mine car accidentally running over some loose explosives. This, coupled with a failure to damp the coal dust, resulted in a large explosion that killed 13. The next day, on March 19, 11 rescue workers then entered the area, and a second explosion occurred killing them all.
