= W.R. Arthur =

American sidewheel steamer (1864–1871)

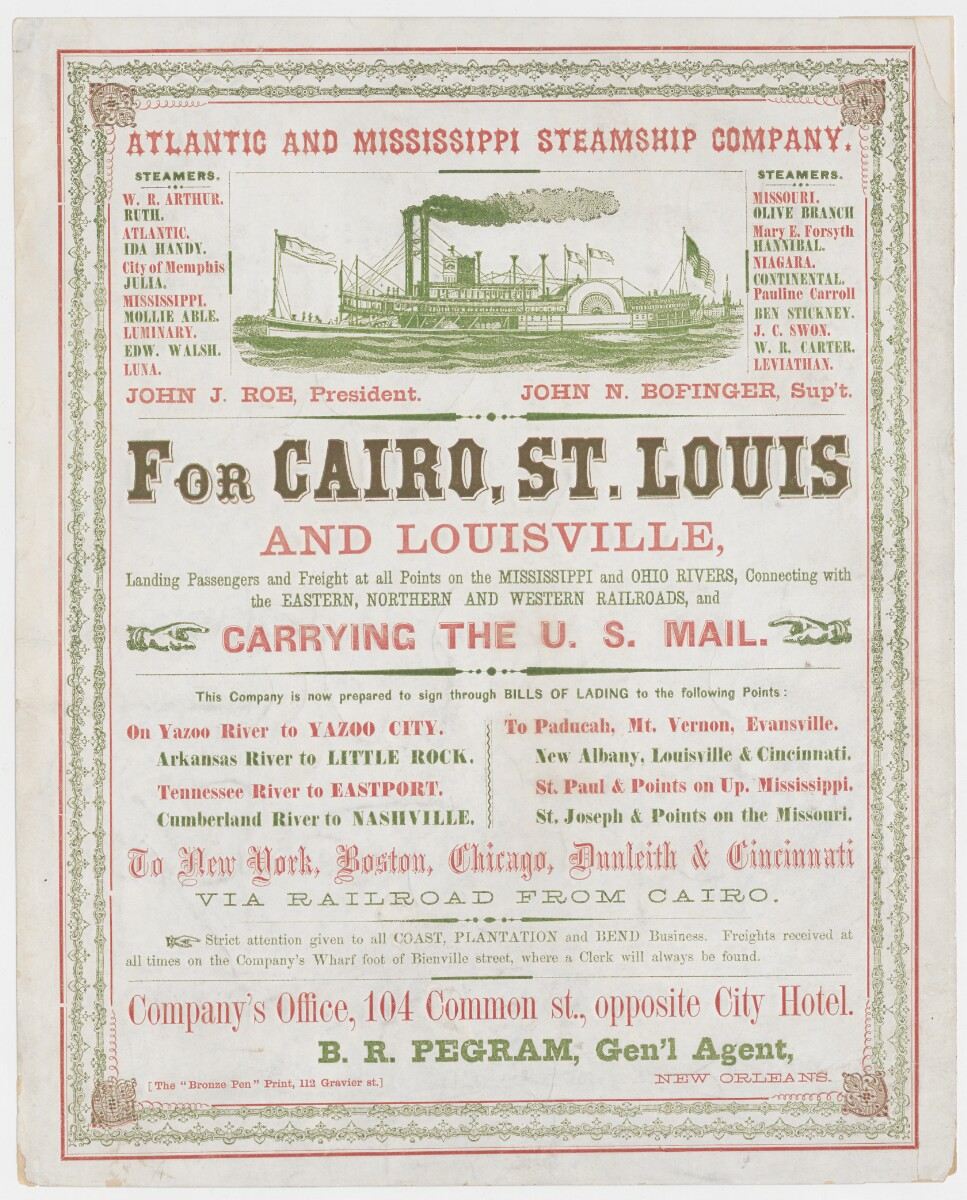
The W.R. Arthur was a steamer of the Atlantic and Mississippi Steamship Company (Duke University Libraries Digital Collections)

The W.R. Arthur was a sidewheel steamer that was built in 1864 and worked the Mississippi River. Five of her six boilers exploded on January 28, 1871, when she was about 14 mi (23 km) north of Memphis, Tennessee, and she burned and sank, killing between 45 and 60 passengers and crew.
