= List of disasters in Maine by death toll =

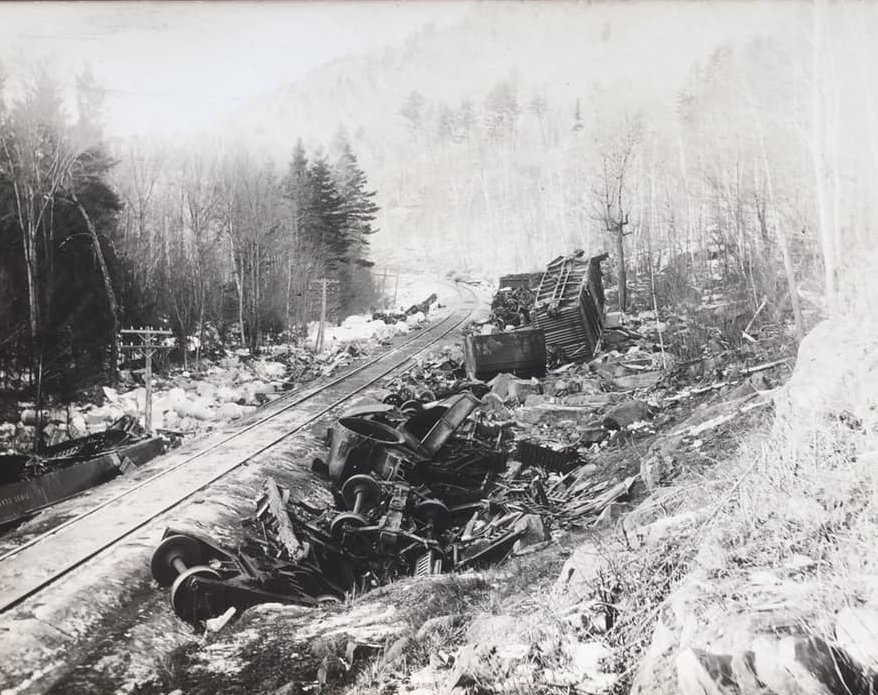
Aftermath of the Onawa train wreck of December 20, 1919

This is a list of disasters that have occurred in Maine organized by death toll. Historically documented events that caused 10 or more deaths are included.

== List ==
Notes:

- Some of the events occurred prior to Maine becoming a U.S. state.
- Acts of war are excluded, such as battles of the American Revolutionary War in Maine.
- Some of the events occurred in the Atlantic Ocean, at varying distances from land.

Year	Event	Type	Death toll	Location	Sources
2020	COVID-19 pandemic	Disease	1,777	statewide	
1864	Wreck of the steamship Bohemian (Note: See: List of shipwrecks in February 1864#22 February and List of maritime disasters in the 19th century#Peacetime disasters)	Accident – ship	42 (Note: Initial reports, when the Bohemian sank in February 1864, gave a death toll of 19.)	off Cape Elizabeth	
1941	Disappearance of the excursion cruiser Don (Note: See: List of shipwrecks in June 1941#29 June)	Accident – ship	34	off Bailey Island	
1850	Maine Insane Asylum fire	Fire	28	Augusta	
1919	Onawa train wreck	Accident – railroad	23	Onawa	
1899	Mount Desert Ferry gangway collapse	Drowning	20	Bar Harbor	
1944	South Portland A-26 Invader crash	Accident – aircraft	19	South Portland	
2023	2023 Lewiston shootings	Mass shooting	19	Lewiston	
1908	Schooner Fame / steamship Boston collision (Note: See: List of shipwrecks in 1908#28 May)	Accident – ship	18	off Seguin Light	
1807	Wreck of the Hanover	Accident – ship	17	off Pond Island	
1945	Lacoste Babies Home fire	Fire	17	Auburn	
1979	Downeast Airlines Flight 46	Accident – aircraft	17	Rockland	
1807	Wreck of the schooner Charles (Note: See: List of shipwrecks in 1807#12 July)	Accident – ship	16	off Richmond Island	
1920	Chesuncook Lake drownings	Accident – boat	16	Bangor	
1947	Great Fires of 1947	Wildfires	16	Statewide	
1807	Wreck of the Sagunto	Accident – ship	14	off Smuttynose Island	
1902	Isles of Shoals boating accident	Accident – boat	14	off Appledore Island	
2002	Allagash Wilderness Waterway van accident	Drowning	14	Millinocket	
1860	Wreck of the schooner Neptune's Bride (Note: See: List of shipwrecks in September 1860#22 September)	Accident – ship	12	off Criehaven	
1936	Gardner Lake Tragedy	Accident – boat	12	Marion Township	
1849	Disappearance of the schooner Levi Woodbury (Note: See: List of shipwrecks in October 1849#Unknown date)	Accident – ship	10	off Boon Island	
1920	Wreck of the SS Polias (Note: See: List of shipwrecks in 1920#6 February)	Accident – ship	10	off Port Clyde	
1944	North Oxford B-17 Flying Fortress crash (Note: See: North Oxford, Maine#1944 B-17 crash)	Accident – aircraft	10	North Oxford	
1947	Brockton drownings at Moosehead Lake	Accident – boat	10	Greenville	

Notable events in Maine that claimed multiple lives, but less than 10 (thus are not included in the above list), include the 1933 Belfast, Maine shooting, the crash of TWA Flight 277 in 1944, the crash of Bar Harbor Airlines Flight 1808 in 1985, the 2014 Noyes Street fire, and the 2023 Bowdoin–Yarmouth shootings.

== See also ==
- List of accidents and disasters by death toll
- List of natural disasters by death toll
- List of disasters in Massachusetts by death toll
- List of disasters in New Hampshire by death toll
- List of disasters in the United States by death toll
