= List of shipwrecks in February 1864 =

The list of shipwrecks in February 1864 includes ships sunk, foundered, grounded, or otherwise lost during February 1864.

== 1 February ==
List of shipwrecks: 1 February 1864
Ship	State	Description
Belle Creole	United States	The 206-ton sternwheel paddle steamer struck a snag and sank in the Mississippi River at Plum Point, Tennessee, with the loss of one life.
Emily	United Kingdom	The ship was wrecked at the mouth of the Rio Grande. She was on a voyage from Cádiz, Spain to the Rio Grande.
Planet	United States	The 604-ton sidewheel paddle steamer was stranded on the Mississippi River at College Point, Louisiana.
Jack Frost	United States	The barque was wrecked during a violent gale in Foveaux Strait, southern New Zealand.
Leda	United Kingdom	The brig was driven ashore at Blyth, Northumberland. She was on a voyage from Boulogne, Pas-de-Calais, France to Blyth. She was refloated with the assistance of two tugs and taken in to Blyth.
New Great Britain	United Kingdom	The ship was driven ashore at Bluff Harbour, New Zealand. She was refloated with the assistance of a steamship and was beached. She was consequently condemned.
Pacific	(United Kingdom of Great Britain and Ireland) Tasmania	The whaler was wrecked at Paterson Inlet, Stewart Island, southern New Zealand during a heavy westerly gale. All hands were saved.
USS Smith-Briggs	United States Army	American Civil War, Battle of Smithfield: After being disabled by enemy fire, running aground in the Pagan River at Smithfield, Virginia, confederate States of America, and being captured by Confederate troops on 31 January, the sidewheel gunboat was set on fire by the Confederates. She was destroyed by an explosion when the flames reached her store of black powder.
Thistle	United Kingdom	The sloop was driven ashore on Goat Island. Her crew were rescued. She was on a voyage from Liverpool, Lancashire to Stirling.
Wild Dayrell	Spain	American Civil War, Union blockade: Bound from Nassau and trying to run the Union blockade with a cargo of blankets, provisions, and supplies, the 440-ton sidewheel paddle steamer ran aground between New Topsail Inlet and Stump Inlet on the coast of North Carolina, Confederate States of America. The armed sidewheel paddle steamer USS Sassacus (United States Navy) found and captured her. After salvage efforts failed, the crews of Sassacus and the armed sidewheel paddle steamer USS Florida (United States Navy) burned Wild Dayrell on 3 February.

== 2 February ==
List of shipwrecks: 2 February 1864
Ship	State	Description
Delphin	Russia	The ship was wrecked at "Worupoer", Denmark. She was on a voyage from Dundee, Forfarshire, United Kingdom to Liepāja.
Fire Cracker	United Kingdom	The steamship ran aground in the Yangtze 60 nautical miles (110 km) upstream of "Lew Kiang", China.
Frederick the Great	Flag unknown	American Civil War, Union blockade: Attempting to run the Union blockade with a cargo of gunpowder, lead, percussion caps, rope, liquor, and other goods, the schooner ran aground near the mouth of Caney Creek, Texas, Confederate States of America while under pursuit by boats from the armed screw steamer USS Queen (United States Navy).
Firecracker	United States	The 1,040-ton steamer foundered on the Yangtze River in China 50 nautical miles (93 km) upstream of Kiukiang.
Iona	United Kingdom	American Civil War, Union blockade: The Confederate-owned 368-gross register ton sidewheel paddle steamer, a blockade runner, was 24 hours into a voyage from Queenstown, County Cork, United Kingdom, to Nassau in the Bahamas when she foundered in the Bristol Channel off Lundy Island, Devon, United Kingdom. Her 39 crew were rescued by the pilot boat No. 32 (United Kingdom).
Louisa	Prussia	The barque was abandoned at sea. Her crew were rescued. She was on a voyage from Memel to Hull, Yorkshire, United Kingdom.
Presto	United Kingdom	American Civil War, Union blockade: The 500-gross register ton sidewheel paddle steamer, a blockade runner with a cargo of stores, liquor, blankets, bacon, ham, and other goods, struck the wreck of the screw steamer Minho (United Kingdom) and ran aground on Sullivan's Island, South Carolina, Confederate States of America. The monitors USS Catskill, USS Lehigh, USS Nahant, and USS Passaic (all United States Navy) and Union Army artillery at Battery Gregg and Fort Strong discovered her there and opened fire on her on 2 February and continued to shell her until 3 or 4 February, by which time she was completely wrecked.
USS Underwriter	United States Navy	American Civil War: While anchored in the Neuse River near New Bern, North Carolina, Confederate States of America, the sidewheel gunboat was boarded and captured by a Confederate States Navy boat expedition. While she was under fire by Union-held Fort Anderson. The Confederates stripped her and set her on fire, and she exploded.
Ville de Saint Martin	France	The ship was wrecked in the Monach Islands, Outer Hebrides, United Kingdom with loss of life.

== 3 February ==
List of shipwrecks: 3 February 1864
Ship	State	Description
B. C. Levi	United States	American Civil War: Carrying a cargo of military stores and passengers that included 28 Union Army soldiers – among them Brigadier General Eliakim P. Scammon (United States Army) – the 110-ton sternwheel paddle steamer was captured on the Kanawha River at Red House, West Virginia, by troops of the 16th Virginia Cavalry Regiment (Confederate States Army) and burned at Vintorux's Landing at the mouth of Big Hurricane Creek.
Morning Star	United Kingdom	The ship ran aground on the Pluckington Bank, in Liverpool Bay. She was on a voyage from Singapore, Straits Settlements to Liverpool, Lancashire. She was refloated with assistance from the tug Enterprise (United Kingdom).
Retriever	United Kingdom	The brig was driven ashore in the River Tay. She was on a voyage from Saint John, New Brunswick, British North America to Dundee, Forfarshire. She was refloated on 9 February and taken in to Dundee.

== 4 February ==
List of shipwrecks: 4 February 1864
Ship	State	Description
Antipodes	United Kingdom	The ship was driven ashore 3 nautical miles (5.6 km) west of Dover, Kent. She was on a voyage from London to Bombay, India. She was refloated with assistance from the Coast Guard and taken in to Dover.
Archimedes	United Kingdom	The brig was driven ashore at Wells-next-the-Sea, Norfolk. She was on a voyage from London to Seaham, County Durham.
Betsey and Jessy	United Kingdom	The ship was driven ashore between Beaumaris and Penmon, Anglesey. She was on a voyage from Dublin to Liverpool, Lancashire.
Jane E. Williams	United Kingdom	The ship caught fire 5 nautical miles (9.3 km) off Tenerife, Canary Islands. She was abandoned the next day. Although subsequently taken in tow, she foundered within sight of Tenerife. She was on a voyage from Liverpool to Shanghai, China.
Ocean Queen	United Kingdom	The ship foundered off Bermuda with the loss of two of her crew. A message in a bottle washed up at Lee, Devon on 6 July giving the news.
Royal Alice	United Kingdom	The full-rigged ship was destroyed by fire at Calcutta, India.
Triumph	United Kingdom	The ship was wrecked near Castletown, Isle of Man. She was on a voyage from Barrow in Furness, Lancashire to Bangor, Caernarfonshire

== 5 February ==
List of shipwrecks: 5 February 1864
Ship	State	Description
Alexander	United States	The clipper struck the Frederick Rock in the Strait of Riau and was beached on East Island, Riau Archipelago, where she became a wreck.
Belle	United Kingdom	The ship was driven ashore at Pontus Cross, Cornwall. She was on a voyage from Plymouth, Devon to Fowey, Cornwall.
Daniel G. Taylor	United States	American Civil War: The 543-ton sidewheel paddle steamer was destroyed on the Ohio River with the loss of one life by a fire set by Confederate infiltrators.
Dick Fulton	United States	The 66-ton sidewheel paddle steamer sank in the Ohio River at Point Pittsburgh with the loss of one life after colliding with Hawkeye (Flag unknown). She was refloated and rebuilt.
Earl of Aberdeen	United Kingdom	The paddle steamer ran aground in the Elbe upstream of Otterndorf, Kingdom of Hanover. She was on a voyage from "Waunan" to London.
Maria	France	The ship was driven ashore at Theddlethorpe, Lincolnshire, United Kingdom. Her crew were rescued. She was on a voyage from Sunderland, County Durham, United Kingdom to Genoa, Italy.
Monmouthshire	United Kingdom	The ship ran aground in the Hooghly River. She was on a voyage from Calcutta, India to Liverpool, Lancashire. She was refloated and resumed her voyage.
Nutfield	United Kingdom	American Civil War, Union blockade: Pursued by the sidewheel paddle steamer USS Sassacus (United States Navy), the 531-gross register ton sidewheel paddle steamer ran aground at New River Inlet on the coast of North Carolina. Her crew abandoned ship. When salvage efforts failed, Union forces removed some of her cargo of Pattern 1853 Enfield rifles, swords, compasses, and quinine and Sassacus and the armed sidewheel paddle steamer USS Florida (United States Navy) destroyed her with gunfire.
Zeemeeuw	Netherlands	The ship departed from "Passaraeong", Netherlands East Indies for a Dutch port. No further trace, presumed foundered with the loss of all hands.

== 6 February ==
List of shipwrecks: 6 February 1864
Ship	State	Description
Blue Bonnet	United Kingdom	The steamship ran ashore on Preston Island, Fife and was severely damaged. She was on a voyage from Grangemouth, Stirlingshire to Leith, Lothian. She was refloated on 12 February and taken in to Bo'ness, Lothian in a waterlogged condition.
Dee	Confederate States of America	American Civil War, Union blockade: The 200-ton screw steamer – a blockade runner carrying a cargo of ammunition, bacon, coffee, distilled spirits, guns, and lead ingots – ran aground on a shoal off North Carolina one mile (1.6 km) south of Masonboro Inlet. Sailors from the armed screw steamer USS Niphon captured her on 7 February, lightened her, and attempted to tow her off, but burned her after she grounded again. The gunboat USS Cambridge (United States Navy) completed her destruction.
Ocean Steed	United States	The full-rigged ship was wrecked on the Punta de Rocha, Uruguay. Her crew were rescued. She was on a voyage from Cardiff, Glamorgan, United Kingdom to Montevideo, Uruguay.
Teaser	(United Kingdom of Great Britain and Ireland) Isle of Man	The smack collided with the steamship Magnetic (United Kingdom) and sank in the Irish Sea with the loss of two of her five crew. Survivors were rescued by Magnetic.
Sonne	Bremen	The ship ran aground in the Weser. She was on a voyage from Messina, Sicily, Italy to Bremen.

== 7 February ==
List of shipwrecks: 7 February 1864
Ship	State	Description
Australian	(United Kingdom of Great Britain and Ireland) New South Wales	The steamship ran aground on a sunken wreck at Newcastle. She was on a voyage from Newcastle to Sydney. She was refloated on 9 February and towed to Sydney for repairs.
Catherina Regina	Russia	The brig ran aground on the Black Rocks, in the Sound of Jura. She was on a voyage from Riga to Belfast, County Antrim, United Kingdom. She was refloated on 9 February and found to be severely leaky.
Perseverance	United Kingdom	The sloop was severely damaged by fire at North Shields, Northumberland.
St. Jean	France	The brig ran aground on the Cross Sand, in the North Sea off the coast of Norfolk, United Kingdom. She was on a voyage from Newcastle upon Tyne, Northumberland to Algiers, Algeria. She was refloated and taken in to Harwich, Essex, United Kingdom in a leaky condition.

== 8 February ==
List of shipwrecks: 8 February 1864
Ship	State	Description
Ann	United Kingdom	The ship was driven ashore at St. Margaret's Bay, Kent. She was on a voyage from Portsmouth, Hampshire to South Shields, County Durham. She was refloated and taken in to The Downs.
Marshall	United Kingdom	The ship was driven ashore at Crosby, Lancashire. She was on a voyage from Padstow, Cornwall to "Swanston". She was refloated and taken in to Liverpool, Lancashire.
San Francisco	Norway	The barque was wrecked on the Herd Sand, in the North Sea off the coast of County Durham. Her crew were rescued by the North Shields and South Shields Lifeboats. She was on a voyage from London to South Shields.
Tay	United Kingdom	The schooner was driven ashore at Saint Andrews, Fife.

== 9 February ==
List of shipwrecks: 9 February 1864
Ship	State	Description
Frederick William	(United Kingdom of Great Britain and Ireland) Guernsey	The ship ran aground on the Kentish Knock. She was on a voyage from South Shields, County Durham to Plymouth, Devon. She was refloated the next day and taken in to Ramsgate, Kent in a leaky condition.
Louisa	United Kingdom	The barque was wrecked on a reef 5 nautical miles (9.3 km) west of Morte Point, Jamaica. Her crew survived. She was on a voyage from London to Kingston, Jamaica.
Olive Branch	United Kingdom	The ship was wrecked on Skye, Outer Hebrides. Her crew were rescued. She was on a voyage from Liverpool, Lancashire to Newcastle upon Tyne, Northumberland.
Shannon	United Kingdom	The ship foundered in the Bristol Channel 10 nautical miles (19 km) west of Lundy Island, Devon. Her crew were rescued by the barque Eitvold (Norway). Shannon was on a voyage from Newport, Monmouthshire to Bari, Italy.
Spunkie	United Kingdom	American Civil War, Union blockade: Trying to run the Union blockade with a cargo of blankets, shoes, and provisions, the 166-gross register ton sidewheel paddle steamer ran aground on the coast just west of Fort Caswell, North Carolina, Confederate States of America. The armed sidewheel paddle steamer USS Quaker City (United States Navy) and two tugs (both United States) found and tried to refloat her, but she broke in two in heavy surf.
Success	United Kingdom	The tug collided with the steamship Heron (United Kingdom) and sank in the Clyde at Govan, Renfrewshire. Her crew survived.

== 10 February ==
List of shipwrecks: 10 February 1864
Ship	State	Description
Camilla	United Kingdom	The ship ran aground off Camden Point, County Cork and was wrecked. She was on a voyage from Glasgow, Renfrewshire to Limerick.
Colonel Stell	Confederate States of America	American Civil War: The 198-ton sidewheel paddle steamer sank accidentally in Galveston Bay off Pelican Island, Texas. The Confederates quickly raised and repaired her and returned her to service.
Emily	United Kingdom	American Civil War, Union blockade: The 355-gross register ton screw steamer, a blockade runner carrying a cargo of gunpowder, salt, and war materials from Bermuda, ran aground north of Masonboro Inlet, North Carolina, Confederate States of America on the night of 9–10 February. Sailors from the armed sidewheel paddle steamer USS Florida (United States Navy) boarded her but came under fire from Confederate artillery. They set her on fire and abandoned her, and she subsequently blew up on 10 February.
Fanny and Jenny	United Kingdom	American Civil War, Union blockade: The 497- or 727-bulk ton sidewheel paddle steamer, a blockade runner carrying cargo of bacon, gunpowder, liquor, an expensive jeweled sword for General Robert E. Lee from British sympathizers, and a quantity of coal, and rumored to be carrying a shipment of gold, ran aground on the coast of North Carolina near Masonboro Inlet. A party from the sidewheel paddle steamer USS Florida (United States Navy) boarded and captured her, but was driven off by Confederate artillery fire, leaving the ship after setting her on fire. She was destroyed by the fire and several explosions.
Juanita	United Kingdom	The brig was in collision with a barque in the Irish Sea off the coast of County Wicklow and was abandoned by her crew, who were rescued by some fishermen. She was on a voyage from Nantes, Loire-Inférieure, France to Liverpool, Lancashire. Juanita was discovered by the tug Merry Andrew (United Kingdom). The pilot boat Curlew (United Kingdom) put six pilots on board and she was towed in to Dún Laoghaire, County Dublin.
Peri	United Kingdom	The brigantine was wrecked at Skysea, Glamorgan. Her crew were rescued.

== 11 February ==
List of shipwrecks: 11 February 1864
Ship	State	Description
Appleton	United Kingdom	The full-rigged ship foundered off A Coruña, Spain. Her crew were rescued by Elizabeth Tatham (United Kingdom). Appleton was on a voyage from Port Glasgow, Renfrewshire to Madras, India.
Futtay Rosae	India	The ship was wrecked in the Laccadive Islands. She was on a voyage from Bombay to the Laccadive Islands.
George Dean	United Kingdom	The ship collided with Constitution (United States) off Anglesey and was abandoned by all bar her captain. She was on a voyage from Liverpool, Lancashire to Demerara, British Guiana.
Luba	(United Kingdom of Great Britain and Ireland) Cape Colony	The barque was destroyed by fire in the Atlantic Ocean. Her crew were rescued by Guadalquiver (United Kingdom). Luba was on a voyage from Leith, Lothian to Table Bay.
Volta	United Kingdom	The ship ran aground at Whitby, Yorkshire. She was on a voyage from Dieppe, Seine-Inférieure to Whitby. She was refloated.

== 12 February ==
List of shipwrecks: 12 February 1864
Ship	State	Description
Dasher	United Kingdom	The brig was driven ashore at Edgartown, Massachusetts, United States. She was on a voyage from Cornwallis, Nova Scotia, British North America to New York, United States. She was refloated and taken in to Holmes Hole, Massachusetts.
Dona Victoria	Norway	The barque struck a submerged object and foundered. Her crew survived. She was being towed from Hull, Yorkshire, United Kingdom to the River Tyne.
James Buller	(United Kingdom of Great Britain and Ireland) British North America	The schooner was wrecked at Louisbourg, Nova Scotia. Her crew were rescued. She was on a voyage from Main-à-Dieu to Louisbourg.
Mi Mi	Duchy of Holstein	The smack was driven ashore and wrecked near Langney, Sussex, United Kingdom. Her six crew were rescued.
Victoria	United Kingdom	The ship struck the Whitlee Rocks, on the coast of County Durham and capsized.
Vulcan	United Kingdom	The brig ran aground on the Gunfleet Sand, in the North Sea off the coast of Suffolk. She was on a voyage from Sunderland, County Durham to Whitstable, Kent. She was refloated and assisted in to Harwich, Essex in a leaky condition.
Unnamed	France	The schooner was discovered abandoned and leaky off Ilfracombe, Devon, United Kingdom. She was boarded by two men from Ilfracombe but subsequently foundered with their loss.

== 13 February ==
List of shipwrecks: 13 February 1864
Ship	State	Description
Agnes	United Kingdom	The ship was presumed to have foundered in the Irish Sea with the loss of all hands. She was on a voyage from Drogheda, County Louth to Preston, Lancashire.
Anna	Norway	The schooner ran aground on Scroby Sands, Norfolk, United Kingdom. She was on a voyage from Ipswich, Suffolk to Newcastle upon Tyne Northumberland, United Kingdom. She was refloated with the assistance of a tug and towed in to Great Yarmouth, Norfolk.
Ann and Jane	United Kingdom	The ship was towed in to the River Tyne by the tug Osprey (United Kingdom). She was on a voyage from Middlesbrough, Yorkshire to Blyth, Northumberland.
Annie	United Kingdom	The lighter foundered off Helensburgh, Renfrewshire with the loss of all three crew. She was on a voyage from Port Dundas, Renfrewshire to Gairloch, Ross-shire. She was refloated on 8 April and taken in to Helensburgh, Argyllshire.
Bon Nova	Portugal	The schooner was run ashore at Penmanarch, Anglesey, United Kingdom. She was on a voyage from Porto to Liverpool.
Britannia	United Kingdom	The schooner was run ashore at Penmanarch. She was on a voyage from New Quay, Carmarthenshire to Liverpool.
Ceres	United Kingdom	The schooner was driven ashore and damaged in Clew Bay. She was on a voyage from Liverpool to Westport, County Mayo.
Christina	United Kingdom	The lighter foundered in the Firth of Clyde with the loss of both crew. She was on a voyage from Greenock, Renfrewshire to Cardross, Argyllshire.
Fort George	United Kingdom	The East Indiaman was driven ashore and severely damaged in the Cymyran Strait. Her crew were rescued. She was on a voyage from Liverpool to Calcutta, India.
Friendship	United Kingdom	The ship was towed in to South Shields in a sinking condition. She was on a voyage from Middlesbrough to Blyth.
Gipsey	United Kingdom	The schooner foundered in the Irish Sea off Lytham St. Annes, Lancashire with the loss of all four crew. She was on a voyage from Drogheda to Preston.
Helen Steward	United Kingdom	The schooner was driven ashore and damaged at Whitby, Yorkshire. She was on a voyage from London to Seaham, County Durham. She was refloated with assistance and taken in to Whitby.
Islay	United Kingdom	The ship was driven ashore at Bowmore, Islay. She was on a voyage from Glasgow, Renfrewshire to Bowmore. She was refloated on 15 February.
Jane and Ann	United Kingdom	The ship was towed in to the River Tyne in a sinking condition. She was on a voyage from Middlesbrough to Blyth.
James Dowell	United Kingdom	The ship foundered off Souter Point. Her crew were rescued by Wonder (United Kingdom). James Dowell was on a voyage from Middlesbrough to Blyth.
John and Margaret	United Kingdom	The schooner foundered off Eyemouth, Berwickshire with the loss of both crew. She was on a voyage from Blyth to Dundee, Forfarshire.
London	(United Kingdom of Great Britain and Ireland) Jersey	The dandy was abandoned in the North Sea. She was on a voyage from St Andrews, Fife to London. She was discovered on 21 February by the steamship Best Bower (United Kingdom) and towed in to Leith, Lothian, where she arrived the next day
Native	(United Kingdom of Great Britain and Ireland) British North America	The barque was wrecked on Taransay, Outer Hebrides. Her twelve crew were rescued. She was on a voyage from the Clyde to Demerara, British Guiana.
Saga	Denmark	The brig was wrecked at Torre. She was on a voyage from Newcastle upon Tyne to Alexandria, Egypt.
Sisters	United Kingdom	The ship foundered off Souter Point with the loss of but one of her crew. The survivor was rescued by Ann and Jane (United Kingdom). Sisters was on a voyage from Middlesbrough to Blyth.
Star of the Sea	United Kingdom	The schooner foundered in the Irish Sea off Lytham St. Annes with the loss of all hands. She was on a voyage from Drogheda to Preston.
Thistle	United Kingdom	The schooner foundered in the Firth of Clyde off Pladda with the loss of two of her three crew. She was on a voyage from Port Dundas to Oban, Argyllshire.
Union	United Kingdom	The ship may have foundered in the North Sea with the loss of all hands. She was on a voyage from Newcastle upon Tyne to Inverness.
Vaucluse	United Kingdom	The full-rigged ship was wrecked on Sandhale, at the mouth the Humber. Fourteen of the twenty people on board were rescued by the Donna Nook Lifeboat, the rest reached shore in a boat. She was on a voyage from Hull, Yorkshire to South Shields, County Durham.
Victoria	United Kingdom	The ship was driven ashore in the River Tyne. She was on a voyage from North Shields, Northumberland to Genoa, Italy and Odesa. She was refloated and taken in to North Shields.
Viscount Kingarth	United Kingdom	The schooner was driven ashore and severely damaged at Oban. Her crew were rescued. She was on a voyage from Belfast, County Antrim to Rothesay, Isle of Bute. She was refloated on 4 March and taken in to Rothesay, Bute for repairs.
Water Witch	United Kingdom	The ship foundered in the North Sea off Marsden, County Durham with the loss of all but one of her crew. The survivor was rescued by Friendship (United Kingdom). Water Witch was on a voyage from Middlesbrough to Blyth.
William	United Kingdom	The schooner was driven ashore near Button-ness, Forfarshire. She was on a voyage from Sunderland, County Durham to Dundee, Forfarshire.
William Wilson	United Kingdom	The barque was driven ashore in the River Lagan.
Unnamed	(United Kingdom of Great Britain and Ireland) Jersey	The smack foundered in the English Channel off Rye, Sussex. The sole crew member on board was rescued although a rescued was subsequently lost. The smack was on a voyage from Dieppe, Seine-Inférieure to Newhaven, Sussex.
Unnamed	United Kingdom	The sloop foundered in the North Sea 12 nautical miles (22 km) off Tynemouth Castle, Northumberland.
Unnamed	United Kingdom	The Thames barge capsized off the Isle of Sheppey, Kent. Her crew were rescued by a smack.

== 14 February ==
List of shipwrecks: 14 February 1864
Ship	State	Description
Brechin Castle	United Kingdom	The brigantine was abandoned in the English Channel off Beachy Head, Sussex. Her six crew were rescued. She was on a voyage from Llanelly, Glamorgan to London. She came ashore at Seaford, Sussex on 17 January and the two ship's dogs were rescued.
Davies and James	United Kingdom	The brigantine foundered in the Atlantic Ocean (43°15′N 7°12′W). Her eight crew were rescued by the brigantine Sarah Maria (United Kingdom). Davies and James was on a voyage from Cardiff to Ancona, Papal States.
Industry	United Kingdom	The schooner was driven against the quayside and severely damaged at Arbroath, Forfarshire.
London	(United Kingdom of Great Britain and Ireland) Jersey	The smack was abandoned in the North Sea. Her crew were rescued by the schooner Venture (United Kingdom). London was on a voyage from London to Saint Andrews, Fife or vice versa.
Margaret and Elizabeth	United Kingdom	The fishing boat ran aground at Burghead, Moray.
Spunkie	United Kingdom	The steamship collided with the sloop Batten Castle (United Kingdom) and sank in the Holy Loch. Her crew were rescued by Batten Castle. Spunkie was on a voyage from Glasgow, Renfrewshire to Coleraine, County Antrim.
William	United Kingdom	The ship was driven ashore near Dundee, Forfarshire. She was on a voyage from the River Wear to Dundee.

== 15 February ==
List of shipwrecks: 15 February 1864
Ship	State	Description
Ferdinand	Hamburg	The ship was driven ashore and wrecked near Saustrup, Duchy of Holstein. Her crew were rescued by a lifeboat. She was on a voyage from Hull, Yorkshire to Odense, Denmark.
Jean and Catharine	United Kingdom	The schooner was abandoned in the North Sea. Her crew were rescued by the schooner Anna (Norway). Jane and Catharine was on a voyage from Sunderland, County Durham to Fraserburgh, Aberdeenshire.
Kossuth	United States	The fishing schooner was lost at Owl's Harbor, Halifax, Nova Scotia. Crew saved.
Oder	Prussia	The ship was wrecked between "Winego" and Marstrand, Sweden. Her crew were rescued. She was on a voyage from Hull, Yorkshire, United Kingdom to Pillau.
Sarah Ellen	United Kingdom	The ship was run down and sunk in the River Thames by the steamship Wearmouth (United Kingdom). Her crew were rescued. Sarah Ellen was on a voyage from London to Seaham, County Durham.

== 16 February ==
List of shipwrecks: 16 February 1864
Ship	State	Description
Catherine Heughes	United Kingdom	The ship was driven ashore in the Sound of Jura. She was on a voyage from Liverpool, Lancashire to Newcastle upon Tyne, Northumberland.
Henry	United Kingdom	The ship was wrecked at Redcar, Yorkshire. Her crew were rescued. She was on a voyage from Hartlepool, County Durham to Faversham, Kent.
Lucy	United Kingdom	The ship was wrecked on the Caleda Coast. She was on a voyage from Table Bay to East London, British Kaffraria.
Thomas Barker	United Kingdom	The schooner was run down and sunk by the brig Edith Mary (United Kingdom) off Flamborough Head, Yorkshire with the loss of eight of her ten crew. Survivors were rescued by Edith Mary. Thomas Barker was on a voyage from South Shields, County Durham to London.
Wave	United Kingdom	The ship collided with Electro (United Kingdom) and sank at Belfast, County Antrim. She was on a voyage from Belfast to Portaferry, County Down. She was refloated on 22 February and beached for repairs.
Unnamed	United Kingdom	The schooner ran into Miranda (United Kingdom) and foundered in the North Sea 25 nautical miles (46 km) east north east of the Farne Islands, Northumberland.

== 17 February ==
List of shipwrecks: 17 February 1864
Ship	State	Description
Brothers	United Kingdom	The ship was wrecked at Redcar, Yorkshire. Her seven crew were rescued by the Redcar Lifeboat, which was damaged during the rescue. Brothers was on a voyage from London to South Shields, County Durham.
Hope	United States Navy	The 218-ton sidewheel paddle steamer sank in the Mississippi River above New Orleans, Louisiana, after colliding with the gunboat USS St. Clair (United States Navy).
USS Housatonic	United States Navy	American Civil War, Union blockade: The screw sloop-of-war was sunk with a spar torpedo by the submarine H. L. Hunley (Confederate States Army) off Charleston, South Carolina, Confederate States of America (32°43′7″N 79°48′17″W) in the first successful submarine attack in history. Five members of Housatonic′s crew were killed.
H. L. Hunley	Confederate States Army	The wreck of H. L. Hunley during its recovery on 8 August 2000. American Civil War, Union blockade: The submarine, operating under the control of the Confederate States Army, sank in Charleston Harbor off Charleston, South Carolina], (32°44′N 79°46′W) with the loss of her entire crew of eight after using a spar torpedo to sink the screw sloop-of-war USS Housatonic (United States Navy).
Orient	United States	The 222-ton sternwheel paddle steamer struck a snag and sank in the Mississippi River at Commerce, Missouri, with the loss of 14 lives.

== 18 February ==
List of shipwrecks: 18 February 1864
Ship	State	Description
Ad. Hine	United States	The 94-ton sternwheel paddle steamer struck a snag on the Arkansas River 8 nautical miles (15 km) Pine Bluff, Arkansas, and sank in 8 feet (2.4 m) of water in five minutes. She was refloated and returned to service.
Argus	United Kingdom	The ship was sighted 200 nautical miles (370 km) off São Miguel Island, Azores whilst on a voyage from Gravesend, Kent to São Miguel Island. No further trace, presumed foundered with the loss of all hands.
Mary	United Kingdom	The ship was sighted in the Atlantic Ocean (approximately 2°N 22°W). No further trace, presumed foundered with the loss of all hands. She was on a voyage from the British Cameroons to Liverpool, Lancashire.
Sword Fish	United Kingdom	The brig ran aground on the Toddy Rocks, on the coast of Massachusetts, United States. Her crew were rescued by a lifeboat. She was on a voyage from Boston, Massachusetts to Matanzas, Cuba. She was refloated the next day and put back to Boston.

== 19 February ==
List of shipwrecks: 19 February 1864
Ship	State	Description
Golden Age	United Kingdom	The ship was driven ashore and severely damaged at Dungeness, Kent. All on board were rescued by the Dungeness Lifeboat and a pilot cutter. She was refloated on 27 March but had to be beached at Hythe, Kent. She was later refloated and completed her voyage, arriving at London on 11 April.
Herald	Flag unknown	The schooner was deliberately run ashore about 12 miles (19 km) north of Timaru, New Zealand, after her cargo of lime caught fire. All hands were saved.
Peppino	Italy	The barque was wrecked on the Cross Sand, in the North Sea off the coast of Norfolk, United Kingdom. All sixteen people on board were rescued by a tug. She was on a voyage from Newcastle upon Tyne, Northumberland, United Kingdom to Naples.
Perthshire	United Kingdom	The ship was abandoned in the Atlantic Ocean. Her 21 crew were rescued by the barque Stampede (United Kingdom). Perthshire was on a voyage from Baltimore, Maryland, United States to Liverpool, Lancashire.
Satelite	United Kingdom	The schooner was driven ashore at "Ballygumta". She was on a voyage from Glasgow, Renfrewshire to Newry, County Antrim. She was refloated and resumed her voyage.
Will o' the Wisp	United States	The steamship sprang a leak and was beached at Nassau, Bahamas. She was on a voyage from Bermuda to Wilmington, Delaware.
Unnamed	Greece	The ship was driven ashore in the Gulf of La Seyne. She was refloated and towed in to Toulon, Var, France.

== 20 February ==
List of shipwrecks: 20 February 1864
Ship	State	Description
Alciope	United Kingdom	The ship was wrecked off Cape San Antonio, Cuba. She was on a voyage from Cardiff, Glamorgan to Havana, Cuba.
Ethel	United Kingdom	The brigantine was abandoned off Porthallow, Cornwall. She was on a voyage from Southampton, Hampshire to Llanelly, Glamorgan. She was subsequently towed in to Falmouth, Cornwall.
Ethel	United Kingdom	The ship ran aground on the Dinghy Wallah Flat, in the Hooghly River. She was on a voyage from Calcutta, India to Liverpool, Lancashire. She was refloated and resumed her voyage.
Iskandah Shah	(Ottoman Empire) Ottoman Hejaz	The ship ran aground in the Hooghly River, refloated and collided with Peeress (United Kingdom). She was on a voyage from Calcutta to Jeddah.
Kaskaskia	United States	The 49-ton sidewheel paddle steamer sank in the Grand Chain on the Ohio River.
Four unnamed vessels	Flags unknown	The ships were wrecked in the Îles d'Hyères, Var, France.

== 21 February ==
List of shipwrecks: 21 February 1864
Ship	State	Description
All Serene	United Kingdom	The ship was wrecked in the Pacific Ocean (approximately 24°N 176°W). She was abandoned by her 30 crew on 2 March. Thirteen of them died before their boat landed in the Fiji Islands on 18 March. All Serene was on a voyage from the Colony of Vancouver Island to Sydney, New South Wales.
Berenice	Netherlands	The steamship was wrecked on the Cabezas Rocks, west of Tarifa, Spain. Her crew were rescued by another KNSM steamship. She was on a voyage from Amsterdam, North Holland to Genoa, Italy.
Fancy	United Kingdom	The brig foundered 6 nautical miles (11 km) off Lisbon, Portugal. Her crew were rescued. She was on a voyage from Huelva, Spain to Liverpool, Lancashire.
North Atlantic	United States	The ship was destroyed by fire at Calcutta, India.

== 22 February ==
List of shipwrecks: 22 February 1864
Ship	State	Description
Alexander	United States	The ship struck a reed in the Straits of Rio and was wrecked. She was on a voyage from Liverpool, Lancashire, United Kingdom to Singapore, Straits Settlements.
Bohemian	United Kingdom	The 2,108-gross register ton barque-rigged steamship was on a voyage from Liverpool, Lancashire, England, to Portland, Maine, United States. She struck Aldens Rock in Casco Bay, 4 nautical miles (7.4 km) off Maxwell′s Point at Cape Elizabeth, Maine. After being damaged, her captain maneuvered her closer to land. She went down in 30 feet (9.1 m) of water at 43°34′28″N 070°11′53″W with the loss of 42 (per most sources; some sources give a lower figure) of her 317 passengers and crew. One source states the wreck was later blown up and salvaged extensively.
USS Linden	United States Navy	American Civil War: The steamer sank after striking a snag on the Arkansas River 15 nautical miles (28 km) upstream of its confluence with the Mississippi River.

== 23 February ==
List of shipwrecks: 23 February 1864
Ship	State	Description
Abeona	United Kingdom	The ship was wrecked 5 nautical miles (9.3 km) north east of Fécamp, Seine-Inférieure, France. Her crew survived. She was on a voyage from South Shields, County Durham to Havre de Grâce, Seine-Inférieure.
Eglantine	United Kingdom	The ship ran aground at Sunderland, County Durham. She was on a voyage from Sunderland to Naples, Kingdom of Italy. She was refloated and put back to Sunderland.
Flamingo	United Kingdom	The barque ran aground at Tunara, Spain. She was on a voyage from Cagliari, Sardinia, Italy to Gothenburg. She was refloated with assistance from the tug Adelia ( (United Kingdom of Great Britain and Ireland) Gibraltar) and towed in to the Bay of Gibraltar.
Lucy Thompson	United States	The clipper was abandoned in the Atlantic Ocean 800 nautical miles (1,500 km) west of Cape Clear Island, County Cork with the loss of her captain. Thirty survivors were rescued, eighteen by the full-rigged ship Due Cognati (Prussia) and twelve by T. M. Males (United States). Lucy Thompson was on a voyage from New York to Liverpool, Lancashire, United Kingdom.
Rover	United Kingdom	The tug struck the Pisca Rock, off Holyhead, Anglesey and was beached.

== 24 February ==
List of shipwrecks: 24 February 1864
Ship	State	Description
Bloomer	United Kingdom	The ship was abandoned off the coast of Portugal and was driven ashore 3 nautical miles (5.6 km) from St. Ubes. She was on a voyage from Demerara, British Guiana to London.
Charles Henry	Confederate States of America	American Civil War, Union blockade: The schooner was burned by a gig from the armed sidewheel paddle steamer USS Jacob Bell and the gunboat USS Currituck (both United States Navy) in the waters of Virginia.
Chevy Chase	United Kingdom	The steamship ran aground on the Juelsand, in the Elbe. She was on a voyage from London to Hamburg.
Gratitude	Confederate States of America	American Civil War, Union blockade: The schooner was burned by a gig from the armed sidewheel paddle steamer USS Jacob Bell and the gunboat USS Currituck (both United States Navy) in the waters of Virginia.
Luciano	Austrian Empire	The brig was wrecked at Cape Finisterre, Spain. Her crew were rescued. She was on a voyage from Newcastle upon Tyne, Northumberland, United Kingdom to Trieste.
Nan-Nan (or Little Lila)	United Kingdom	American Civil War, Union blockade: Fleeing from the sidewheel paddle steamer USS Nita (United States Navy), the steamer, a blockade runner carrying a cargo of cotton, ran aground in the East Pass of the Suwannee River in Florida, Confederate States of America and was burned by her crew to prevent her capture by Union forces.
Thessalia	United Kingdom	The ship was holed by an anchor and sank at Nassau, Bahamas. she was later refloated and placed under repair.

== 26 February ==
List of shipwrecks: 26 February 1864
Ship	State	Description
Henry Elliott	United States	The ship was abandoned off São Miguel Island, Azores. She was on a voyage from Boston, Massachusetts to São Miguel Island.
J. C. Schotel	Netherlands	The ship ran aground on Meindert's Shallow. She was on a voyage from Surabaya, Netherlands East Indies to Rotterdam, South Holland. She was refloated and resumed her voyage.
Talpoor	India	The steamship, which had been launched on 9 February, was wrecked.

== 27 February ==
List of shipwrecks: 27 February 1864
Ship	State	Description
Koophandel	Netherlands	The ship was driven ashore at Hellevoetsluis, Zeeland.
Lovise	Danzig	The barque was discovered derelict in the North Sea 130 nautical miles (240 km) off the mouth of the Humber by the steamship Martlet (United Kingdom). She was towed in to Hull, Yorkshire
Rebel	Unknown	American Civil War, Union blockade: The schooner, carrying a cargo of cotton, liquor, salt, and boxed goods, was captured and destroyed by boats from the barque USS Roebuck (United States Navy) at Fort Compton on the Indian River, Florida, Confederate States of America.
Varna	United Kingdom	The brig was driver ashore at Sheringham, Norfolk. her crew survived. She was on a voyage from Blyth, Northumberland to Folkestone, Kent.
Westward Ho!	Peru	The clipper burned and sank while at anchor at Callao.

== 28 February ==
List of shipwrecks: 28 February 1864
Ship	State	Description
Alice Jane	United Kingdom	The schooner was driven ashore at Peniche, Portugal. She was on a voyage from Liverpool, Lancashire to Lisbon, Portugal.
Forsiena Siens	Spain	The ship foundered in the Atlantic Ocean. Her crew were rescued by the barque Faithful (United Kingdom). Forsiena Siens was on a voyage from Seville to Bremerhaven and Newcastle upon Tyne, Northumberland, United Kingdom.
Lykkens Rose	Netherlands	The sloop was driven ashore and wrecked at Horsey, Norfolk, United Kingdom. She was on a voyage from Stavanger, Norway to London, United Kingdom.
Nautilus	United States	The ship was wrecked on Atwood Key, Bahamas. She was on a voyage from Boston, Massachusetts to Havana, Cuba.

== 29 February ==
List of shipwrecks: 29 February 1864
Ship	State	Description
Bessie Dean	United Kingdom	The ship collided with Mary Blair (United Kingdom) and sank in the Bristol Channel. Her crew were rescued by Mary Blair. Bessie Dean was on a voyage from Llanelly, Glamorgan to the Loire.
Cassie Holt, or Catherine Holt	Confederate States of America	American Civil War, Union blockade: After being captured in the Gulf of Mexico in San Luis Pass inside Galveston Island off Galveston, Texas, by the mortar gunboat USS Virginia (United States Navy) earlier in the day, the sloop, carrying a cargo of cotton, ran aground off San Luis Pass. Sources differ on whether Virginia burned her to prevent her recapture by Confederate forces or was unable to burn her.
Commodore	United Kingdom	The ship ran aground on the White Mouse Bank, off Dungarvan, County Donegal. She was on a voyage from Cardiff, Glamorgan to Dungarvan.
Elizabeth	United Kingdom	The ship was wrecked on the Haisborough Sands, in the North Sea off the coast of Norfolk. Her eleven crew were rescued by Mitchelgrove (United Kingdom).
Ino	United Kingdom	The Yorkshire Billyboy collided with the brig Highlander and sank in the North Sea off Hartlepool, County Durham with the loss of all but her captain. He was rescued by Highlander. Ino was on a voyage from King's Lynn, Norfolk to Newcastle upon Tyne, Northumberland.
Palladium	United Kingdom	The ship was wrecked on Scroby Sands, Norfolk. Her seven crew survived. She was on a voyage from Newcastle upon Tyne to London.
William and Richard	United Kingdom	The ship was abandoned off the Haisborough Sands. Her crew survived. She was discovered derelict by the steamship Hope (United Kingdom), which put three crew aboard. She was towed in to Great Yarmouth. A Revenue Cutter put seven crew on board to assist with pumping but she sank with the loss of one man from each ship.

== Unknown date ==
List of shipwrecks: Unknown date in February 1864
Ship	State	Description
Actif	France	The ship collided with the steamships Bittern and Swallow (both United Kingdom) and sank at Vlaardingen, South Holland, Netherlands.
Adrian	United Kingdom	The ship was wrecked at Olinda, Brazil. She was on a voyage from Cardiff, Glamorgan to Pernambuco, Brazil.
Agnes	United Kingdom	The ship was abandoned in the Bay of Biscay. She was on a voyage from Glasgow, Renfrewshire to Saint Thomas, Virgin Islands.
Alarm	United Kingdom	The ship was discovered derelict off Margate, Kent. She was on a voyage from London to Cowes, Isle of Wight. She was taken in to Ramsgate, Kent.
Alpha	United States	The brig was driven ashore at Cape Elizabeth, Maine. She was on a voyage from Windsor, Nova Scotia, British North America to New York. She was refloated on 17 February.
America	United Kingdom	The ship was driven ashore. She was on a voyage from Hartlepool, County Durham to Bordeaux, Gironde, France. She was refloated and taken in to Ramsgate in a leaky condition.
Aurora	Netherlands	The ship was taken in to Kinsale, County Cork, United Kingdom in a derelict condition before 6 February.
Caledonia	United Kingdom	The steamship was driven ashore at Flamborough Head, Yorkshire. She was on a voyage from London to Leith, Lothian.
Cassange	United Kingdom	The barque was destroyed by fire in the Atlantic Ocean before 16 February. Her crew were rescued by Rapid (United Kingdom).
Challenger	United Kingdom	The brig collided with Ariel (United Kingdom) and was beached on the Barrow Sand, in the North Sea off the coast of Essex. She was refloated and beached on the Gunfleet Sand, where she became a wreck.
De Brus	Netherlands	The steamship was driven ashore near Quillebeuf-sur-Seine, Eure, France.
Deux Associes	France	The ship was driven ashore on the French coast. She was on a voyage from "Fresnes" to the Clyde. She was refloated and taken in to La Trinité-sur-Mer, Morbihan in a leaky condition.
Fearless	United States	The fishing schooner was lost on Miquelon Island. Crew saved.
Forsenia Siers	Flag unknown	The ship foundered.
Fort William	United Kingdom	The ship ran aground on the James and Mary Sand, in the Hooghly River before 20 February. She was on a voyage from London to Calcutta, India. She was refloated two days later and taken in to Calcutta.
Glenorchy	United Kingdom	The brig was abandoned off Cape Finisterre, Spain.
Gorham Babson	United States	The schooner sailed from Gloucester, Massachusetts on the 8th and vanished. Lost with all 9 hands.
Hannah	United Kingdom	The ship collided with Figaro (Hamburg) and sank in the Irish Sea. She was on a voyage from Ardrossan, Ayrshire to Morecambe, Lancashire.
Hermina	Denmark	The ship was wrecked at Thisted. She was on a voyage from Horsens to Sandwich, Kent.
Hope	United Kingdom	The ship was driven ashore at Troon, Ayrshire.
Ida	United Kingdom	The ship ran aground on the Itampaca Reef, off the coast of Brazil. She was on a voyage from Pernambuco to Paraíba.
John Bull	United Kingdom	The ship was abandoned off Alderney, Channel Islands. She was on a voyage from Guernsey, Channel Islands to Southampton, Hampshire.
Juno	United Kingdom	The brig foundered in the Sound of Jura with the loss of all hands before 17 February.
Lizzie Baron	Confederate States of America	The schooner sank off Lamar, Texas.
Messenger	United Kingdom	The ship was driven ashore at Collier Hope, Yorkshire. She had been refloated by 26 February.
Neerdsland	India	The ship sank near Surabaya, Netherlands East Indies.
Oder	Prussia	The steamship was wrecked between "Wingo" and Marstrand, Sweden. She was on a voyage from Hull, Yorkshire, United Kingdom to Pillau.
Palestrino	Austrian Empire	The ship was lost near Montevideo, Uruguay.
Petrel	United Kingdom	The ship was wrecked at Cape São Roque, Brazil.
Raven	United States	The schooner sailed from Gloucester, Massachusetts on the 6th and vanished. Lost with all 9 hands.
CSS Sharp	Confederate States Navy	American Civil War: The 218-ton sidewheel paddle steamer was burned by Confederate forces on the Yalobusha River in Mississippi to prevent her capture by Union forces.
Star	United Kingdom	The ship was driven ashore at Ardrossan, Ayrshire. She was on a voyage from Cardiff to the Clyde.
St. Jean	France	The ship departed from Swansea, Glamorgan for Rouen, Seine-Inférieure. Presumed subsequently foundered with the loss of all hands; a nameboard washed up at Le Rozel, Manche in late April.
St. Mary′s	Confederate States of America	American Civil War, Union blockade: The 337-ton sidewheel paddle steamer, carrying a cargo of cotton, was scuttled by her crew on 7 or 9 February to prevent her from being captured by the gunboat USS Norwich (United States Navy), which had trapped her in McGirt's Creek above Jacksonville, Florida. She was refloated, rebuilt, and placed in service by Union forces.
Tantivy	United Kingdom	The schooner was driven ashore and wrecked in Loch Ardrisahig. She was on a voyage from Newcastle upon Tyne, Northumberland to Dundee, Forfarshire.
Temora	United Kingdom	The steamship was driven ashore at "Sometverne", Denmark. She was on a voyage from Leith to Danzig. She was refloated and put in to Copenhagen, Denmark on 11 February in a severely leaky condition and was beached there.
Victoria	France	The full-rigged ship was wrecked at Cape Frio, Brazil. She was on a voyage from Rio de Janeiro, Brazil to Havre de Grâce, Seine-Inférieure.
Wild Duck	United Kingdom	The ship was driven ashore near Messina, Sicily, Italy.
