= Maine shootings =

Maine shootings may refer to:

- 1933 Belfast, Maine shooting
- Stephen Marshall
- 2006 Newry shootings by Christian Charles Nielsen
- 2023 Bowdoin–Yarmouth shootings, in April
- 2023 Lewiston shootings, in October
