= SS Hungarian =

Transatlantic steamship of the Canadian Allan Line

- Illustration of the loss of Hungarian in Harper's Weekly, 6 March 1860

History
- Name: Hungarian
- Owner: Allan Line
- Route: Liverpool – Montreal
- Builder: Wm Denny & Bros
- Yard number: 70
- Launched: September 25, 1858
- Completed: 1859
- Maiden voyage: May 18, 1859
- Fate: Wrecked at Cape Sable, Nova Scotia, February 19, 1860

General characteristics
- Tonnage: 2,190 GRT
- Length: 298 feet (91 m)
- Beam: 38.5 feet (11.7 m)
- Draught: 17 feet (5.2 m)
- Installed power: 400 nhp
- Propulsion: direct-acting steam engine, single screw
- Sail plan: 3-masted barquentine
- Crew: 73

SS Hungarian was a transatlantic steamship of the Canadian Allan Line that was launched in 1858, completed in 1859, and sank in 1860.

William Denny and Brothers of Dumbarton, Scotland launched her on September 25, 1858. She was powered by a 400 nhp direct-acting steam engine that drove a single screw. She was completed in 1859. Hungarian's maiden voyage began on May 18, 1859, when she left Liverpool for Quebec. She was wrecked in 1860 at Cape Sable Island, off Nova Scotia, with the loss of all aboard.

== Rescue of the John Martin ==
At 8:00 on November 9, 1859, Hungarian sighted a vessel in distress in a strong northerly gale and high seas off the edge of the Newfoundland Banks. A crew of 7 men, including Chief Officer Hardie and Third Officer Porter were lowered into a lifeboat and headed to the vessel. Upon arriving within hailing range, they were told the ship was the British schooner John Martin, which also carried the rescued crew of another schooner wrecked off Labrador. The sinking John Martin was abandoned by its complement of 43, including 23 women and children. Chief Officer Hardie was knocked overboard while helping passengers into Hungarian. He could not swim, but hauled himself aboard by a rope and survived the ordeal.

Hungarian headed for St. John's and arrived on the morning of November 10. Each member of Hungarian's crew who had helped in the lifeboat was given a party by the passengers of the trip, and also received a silver cup for their heroism.

== Sinking ==
On February 8, 1860, Hungarian left Liverpool, England for Portland, Maine, under the command of Captain Thomas Jones. She called at Queenstown, Ireland, and departed from there on February 9, 1860. On the night of February 19, she wrecked on Cape Ledge, the west side of Cape Sable, Nova Scotia, with total loss of life. The wrecked ship, and survivors who clung to her, were visible from shore, but unreachable due to high seas and gale-force winds that did not relent until six days later.

Newspaper articles were published for months after the incident. Most messages about the disaster were sent out from Barrington Telegraph and relayed to major cities. News of the wreck following soon after that of her sister ship Indian "threw a sense of gloom over the whole of British America". All 205 people on board died in the sinking.

== See also ==
- SS Bohemian (1859), another ship of the Allan Line, next-built at the same shipyard, also lost after striking a submerged ledge
