= Onawa train wreck =

1919 railroad accident near Onawa, Maine

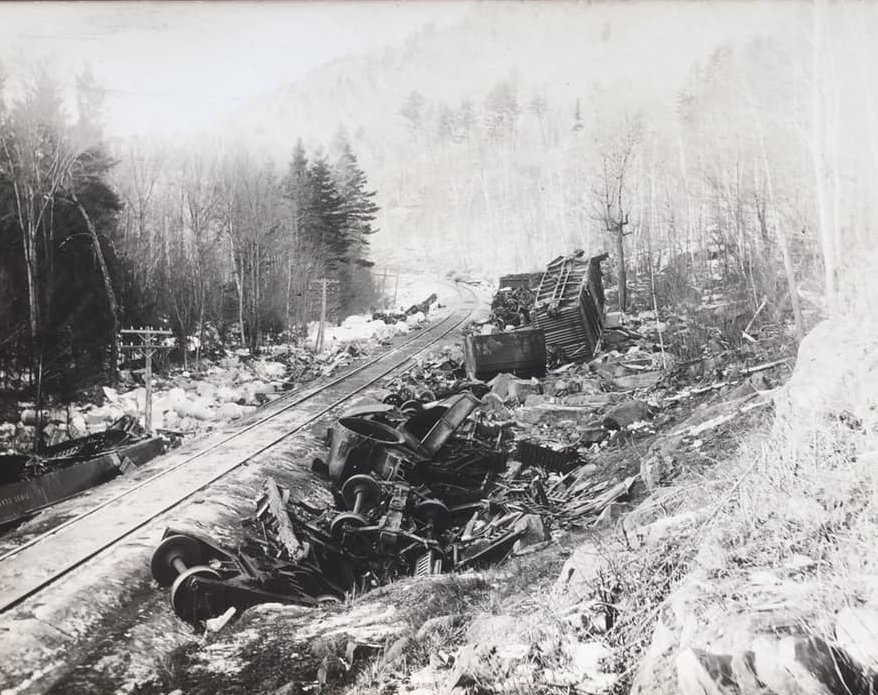
- Aftermath of the collision

Details
- Date: December 20, 1919; 7:14 a.m.
- Location: Northeast Piscataquis, Piscataquis County, near Onawa, Maine
- Coordinates: 45°22′14″N 69°24′35″W
- Country: United States
- Line: International Railway of Maine
- Operator: Canadian Pacific Railway
- Incident type: Head-on collision
- Cause: Mis-reading of train orders

Statistics
- Trains: 2
- Passengers: 300
- Deaths: 23
- Injured: 50

The Onawa train wreck was a fatal railroad accident that happened two miles (3.2 km) west of Onawa, Maine, on December 20, 1919, and killed 23 people.

== Background ==
The line concerned was constructed and operated by the Canadian Pacific Railway, known as the International Railway of Maine. It crossed the state and provided a shortcut between the Canadian cities of Montreal and Saint John, New Brunswick.

== Incident ==
On the morning of December 20, 1919, Train No. 39, an eleven-car immigrant special bound for Montreal, was moving west in four sections. Third 39 (Note: "Third 39" refers to the third section of Train No. 39. In this context, a "section" is actually a complete train—locomotive(s) and train cars—scheduled to operate a specific amount of time behind the prior section.) carried steerage passengers from the liner Empress of France, which had docked in Saint John the previous day, carrying a few Canadian soldiers and 300 immigrants, mostly English and Scottish. By the time Third 39 departed Brownville Junction at 6:25 a.m., it was running over five hours late.

Freight train No. 78 had departed Megantic at 6 p.m. the previous evening. It consisted of 26 cars and had been waiting on a siding at Moosehead, where it had allowed the first two sections of No. 39 to pass. It had received orders that it was five hours ahead of Third 39, giving it plenty of time to reach Morkill. It left Greenville at 6:40 a.m. and arrived in a siding at Morkill at 6:57 a.m. At Morkill, further orders were received to the effect that Third 39 was late, and Fourth 39 was eight hours late. This order was misread and the freight train mistakenly believed that Third 39 was now running eight hours late, giving them time to reach Brownville Junction before the end of their 16-hour shift.

At 7:14 a.m., as dawn approached, the trains suffered a head-on collision just west of Onawa station on a curve beside Little Greenwood Pond at a combined speed of 50 miles per hour (80 km/h). The baggage car next to the engine was "entirely demolished". The next passenger car telescoped the one behind it for two-thirds of its length. The wreckage then caught fire, adding to the horror. Seventeen people were killed outright, including six children, the enginemen and firemen of both trains, and six more dying after being freed from the wreckage. Fifty people were injured, some severely, and were taken by special train to hospitals in Brownville Junction and Bangor.

== See also ==
- List of disasters in Maine by death toll
