= South Portland A-26 Invader crash =

Maine Plane crash

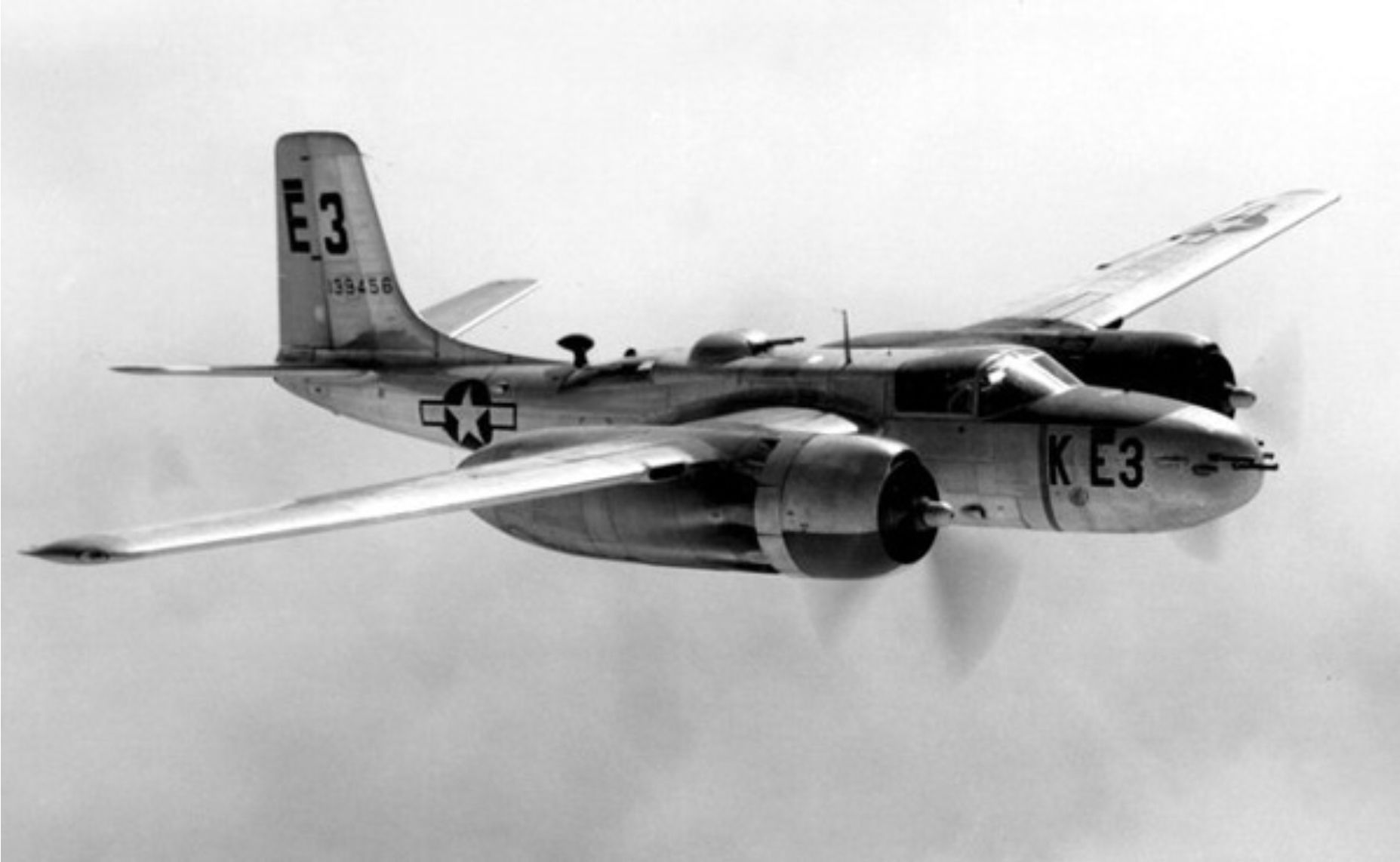
- A similar A-26 Invader

Accident
- Date: July 11, 1944 (82 years ago)
- Summary: Crash landing in fog
- Site: South Portland, Maine, U.S.; 43°38′6″N 70°18′55.9″W

Aircraft
- Aircraft type: Douglas A-26 Invader
- Operator: United States Army Air Forces
- Registration: 43-22253
- Flight origin: Barksdale Field, Louisiana
- Destination: Portland-Westbrook Municipal Airport, Maine
- Passengers: 0
- Crew: 2
- Fatalities: 2
- Survivors: 0

Ground casualties
- Ground fatalities: 17
- Ground injuries: 20

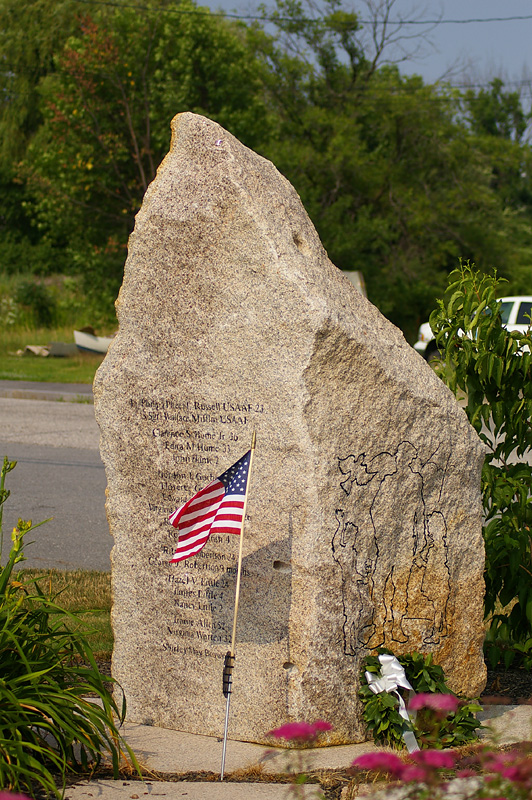
The Long Creek Air Tragedy Memorial in South Portland, Maine.

The South Portland A-26 Invader crash occurred on July 11, 1944, in the historic Brick Hill neighborhood of South Portland, Maine. a Douglas A-26B-5 Invader of the United States Army Air Forces struck the ground while attempting to land in foggy conditions. It cartwheeled through a government-operated trailer park, starting a fire. The aircraft's pilot and navigator were killed. In the trailer park, 17 residents were killed and 20 residents were injured. The incident remains the deadliest aviation accident in Maine history.

== Background ==
Philip Irvin Russell played basketball, baseball, and football at South Portland High School before graduating in 1939 to attend the University of Maine. Russell married his high school classmate and sweetheart in June 1943. He was commissioned as a second lieutenant in the United States Army Air Forces the same month and became a flight instructor at Barksdale Field in Louisiana. A year later, Russell received permission to visit his wife and 3-month-old daughter in South Portland as part of a long-range training mission.

== Incident ==
On July 11, 1944, Russell's family and friends gathered at the Portland airport to await his arrival in patchy heavy fog. The airport officially closed at 16:35 because of the fog. Six minutes later, his family reportedly heard Russell's voice requesting landing instructions on the airport radio, and saw his A-26B-5 Invader appear briefly out of the fog at an estimated altitude of 200 feet (61 m). The airport instructed Russell to climb to 1,500 feet (460 m), and the plane disappeared into the fog. Waiting for a radio response from Russell, airport observers saw flames and heard crash noises from the direction in which the plane had disappeared.

The aircraft struck the ground and cartwheeled through a government-operated trailer park housing families of shipyard workers at the New England Shipbuilding Corporation. Sixteen trailers were destroyed by fire and a dozen more damaged by pieces of the disintegrating airplane. Seventeen trailer-park residents died, and twenty more were injured. The bodies of Russell and his navigator, Staff Sergeant Wallace Mifflin, were found in the trailer-park wreckage.

A "Report of Aircraft Accident" was later compiled by the Army Air Forces, which identified three factors as being responsible for the accident:

1. Lack of training — "the pilot lacked experience in flying this type of aircraft on instruments"
2. Improper clearance – an operations officer signed a form indicating CFR (contact flight rules, a forerunner to visual flight rules) when conditions clearly indicated a need for IFR (instrument flight rules)
3. Unauthorized landing instructions – an operator (air traffic controller) "suggested a runway instead of advising [the pilot] to return immediately to CFR conditions"

== Memorial ==
In 2010, 66 years after the incident, the Long Creek Air Tragedy Memorial was erected to commemorate the crash and honor the victims. A similar memorial on Deer Mountain in North Oxford, 100 miles (160 km) to the north, marks the site of Maine's second-deadliest military plane crash, (Note: The second-deadliest plane crash, of any type, to occur in Maine was Downeast Airlines Flight 46 in 1979, which claimed 17 lives.) when a B-17 bomber crash killed all 10 crew members. Through coincidence, both the A-26 crash and B-17 crash occurred on the same day.

The granite for the Long Creek memorial came from a quarry in Wells, Maine, the same quarry that supplied granite for the Tomb of the Unknowns in Arlington National Cemetery.

== See also ==
- List of disasters in Maine by death toll
