= North Oxford, Maine =

- Unorganized territory
- Location within Maine Location within the United States
- Coordinates: 44°54′29″N 70°55′04″W
- Country: United States
- State: Maine
- County: Oxford

Area
  - Total: 546.2 sq mi (1,414.7 km^{2})
  - Land: 509.6 sq mi (1,319.9 km^{2})
  - Water: 36.6 sq mi (94.8 km^{2})
- Elevation: 1,463 ft (446 m)

Population (2020)
  - Total: 16
  - Density: 0.031/sq mi (0.012/km^{2})
- Time zone: UTC-5 (Eastern (EST))
  - Summer (DST): UTC-4 (EDT)
- ZIP Codes: 04216 (Andover); 04261 (Newry); 04964 (Oquossoc); 03579 (Errol, NH)
- Area code: 207
- FIPS code: 23-52575
- GNIS feature ID: 582634

North Oxford is an unorganized territory in Oxford County, Maine, United States. The population was 16 at the 2020 census.

== Geography ==
According to the United States Census Bureau, the unorganized territory has a total area of 546.2 square miles (1,414.7 km^{2}), of which 509.6 square miles (1,319.9 km^{2}) is land and 36.6 square miles (94.8 km^{2}) (6.70%) is water.

The territory consists of sixteen townships, which are Adamstown, Andover North Surplus, Andover West Surplus, C Surplus, Bowmantown, Grafton, Lower Cupsuptic, Lynchtown, Oxbow, Parkertown, Parmachenee, Richardsontown, Riley, Township C, and Upper Cupsuptic. The terrain is mountainous, with little level ground suitable for raising crops; and the elevation causes frost in June and August, leaving a growing season of approximately 60 days.

== History of Grafton ==
Grafton, the southernmost township, was the only township to achieve incorporation. The first European settler was James Brown in 1834. He built a sawmill in 1838, and a few of the men he hired to cut logs and mill lumber built homes along what is now Maine State Route 26 above Grafton Notch State Park. A few raised some livestock, hay, oats, and potatoes for subsistence. Grafton incorporated in 1852. The town school built just above Grafton Notch had 37 students by 1859, but that number slowly declined to 10 by 1900. The maximum population recorded for the town was 115 in the 1880 census. About a hundred men would come into Grafton for the winter logging season, and leave driving the logs downstream with the spring snowmelt in March or April. The intensity of logging increased in 1893 with completion of the Success Pond Railroad from Berlin, New Hampshire to the New Hampshire border of Grafton. Aboriginal forests had been completely logged when the railroad was dismantled in 1907. When the logging jobs disappeared, most residents sold their land to a pulp and paper company and moved away. Grafton disincorporated in 1919; and the Town records were turned over to Newry, Maine. Most of the structures were demolished by the new landowner to reduce the fire hazard of use by a transient population.

== 1944 B-17 crash ==
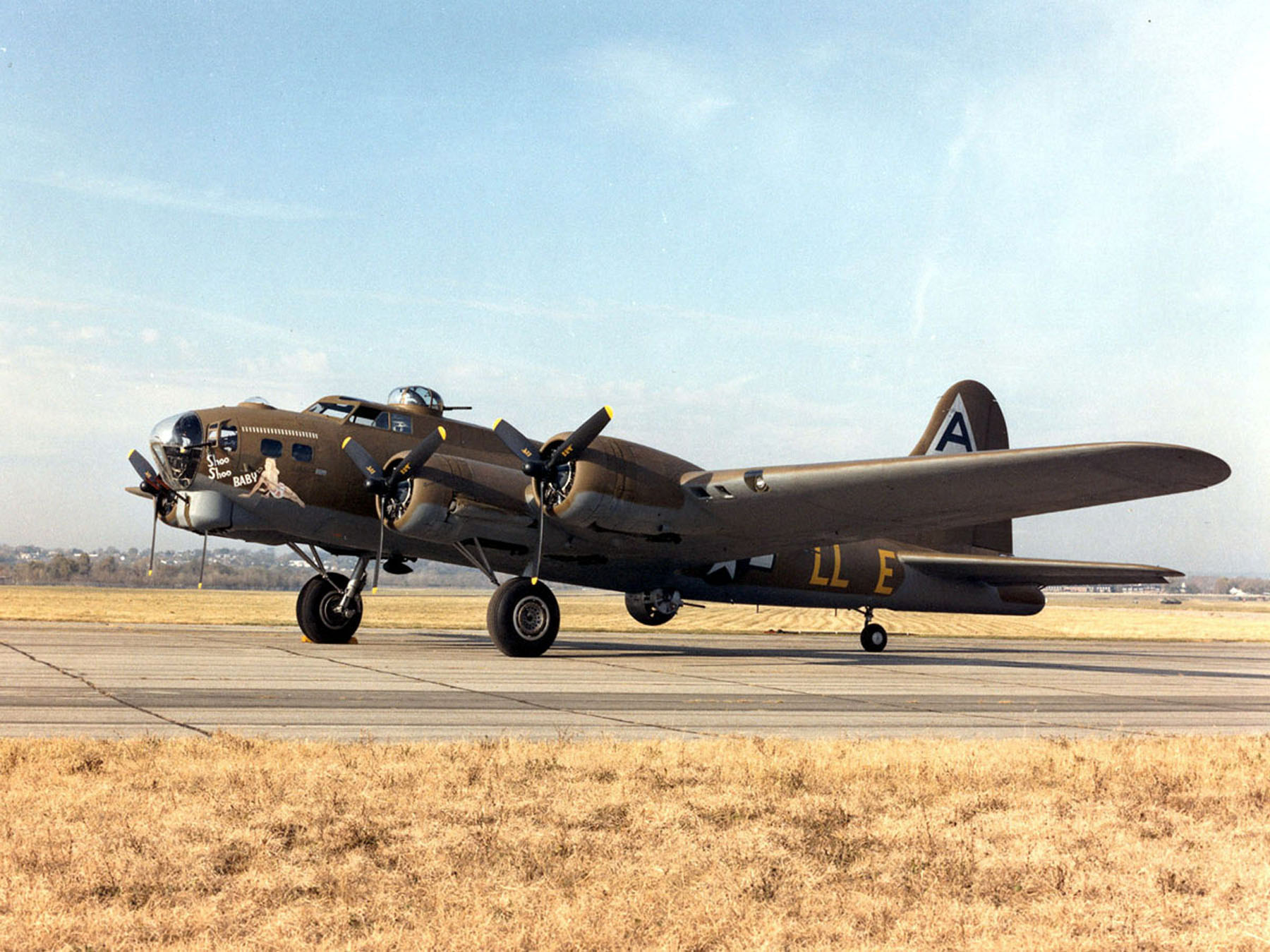
A B-17G similar to the one that crashed on Deer Mountain

North Oxford was the site of Maine's second-deadliest military plane crash. (Note: The second-deadliest plane crash, of any type, to occur in Maine was Downeast Airlines Flight 46 in 1979, which claimed 17 lives.) The crash site now includes a memorial marker and is a popular hiking destination. A similar memorial, located 100 miles (160 km) to the south, marks the site of Maine's deadliest plane crash, the South Portland A-26 Invader crash. Through coincidence, both crashes occurred on the same day—July 11, 1944.

The North Oxford crash was a Boeing B-17 Flying Fortress bomber (s/n 44-38023) flying from Nebraska to Dow Field in Bangor, Maine, in preparation for a trans-Atlantic flight to participate in the World War II strategic bombing of Europe. The crew apparently became lost in thunderstorms around North Oxford, which may have damaged the plane's radio. Local residents heard the bomber wandering through the overcast in searching circles for more than an hour before it crashed 500 feet (150 m) below the summit of Deer Mountain in the southeastern corner of Parkertown Township. There were no survivors from the ten-man United States Army Air Forces crew.

== Demographics ==
Historical population
Census	Pop.	Note	%±
1970	9		—
1980	37		311.1%
1990	11		−70.3%
2000	17		54.5%
2010	24		41.2%
2020	16		−33.3%
U.S. Decennial Census

As of the census of 2000, there were 17 people, 9 households, and 6 families residing in the unorganized territory. The population density was 0.0 inhabitants per square mile (0/km^{2}). There were 254 housing units at an average density of 0.5 per square mile (0.19/km^{2}). The racial makeup of the unorganized territory was 94.12% White, and 5.88% from two or more races.

There were 9 households, out of which 11.1% had children under the age of 18 living with them, 55.6% were married couples living together, and 33.3% were non-families. 22.2% of all households were made up of individuals, and 11.1% had someone living alone who was 65 years of age or older. The average household size was 1.89 and the average family size was 2.17.

In the unorganized territory the population was spread out, with 5.9% under the age of 18, 11.8% from 18 to 24, 11.8% from 25 to 44, 52.9% from 45 to 64, and 17.6% who were 65 years of age or older. The median age was 57 years. For every 100 females, there were 240.0 males. For every 100 females age 18 and over, there were 220.0 males.

The median income for a household in the unorganized territory was $45,625, and the median income for a family was $45,625. Males had a median income of $36,250 versus $0 for females. The per capita income for the unorganized territory was $38,462. None of the population or the families were below the poverty line.
