= Masonboro Inlet =

Coordinates: 34°11′06″N 77°48′44″W

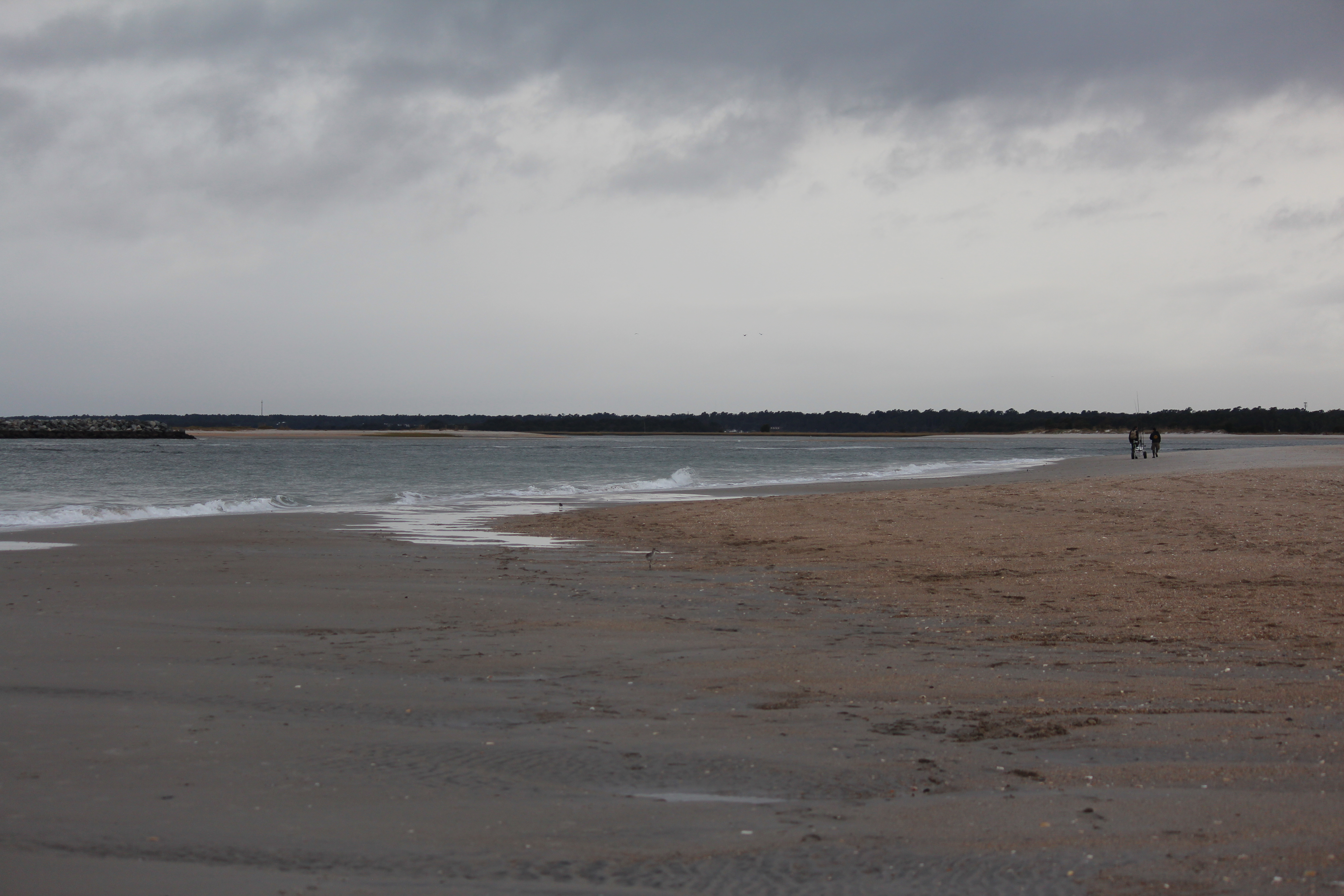
Masonboro inlet inland direction

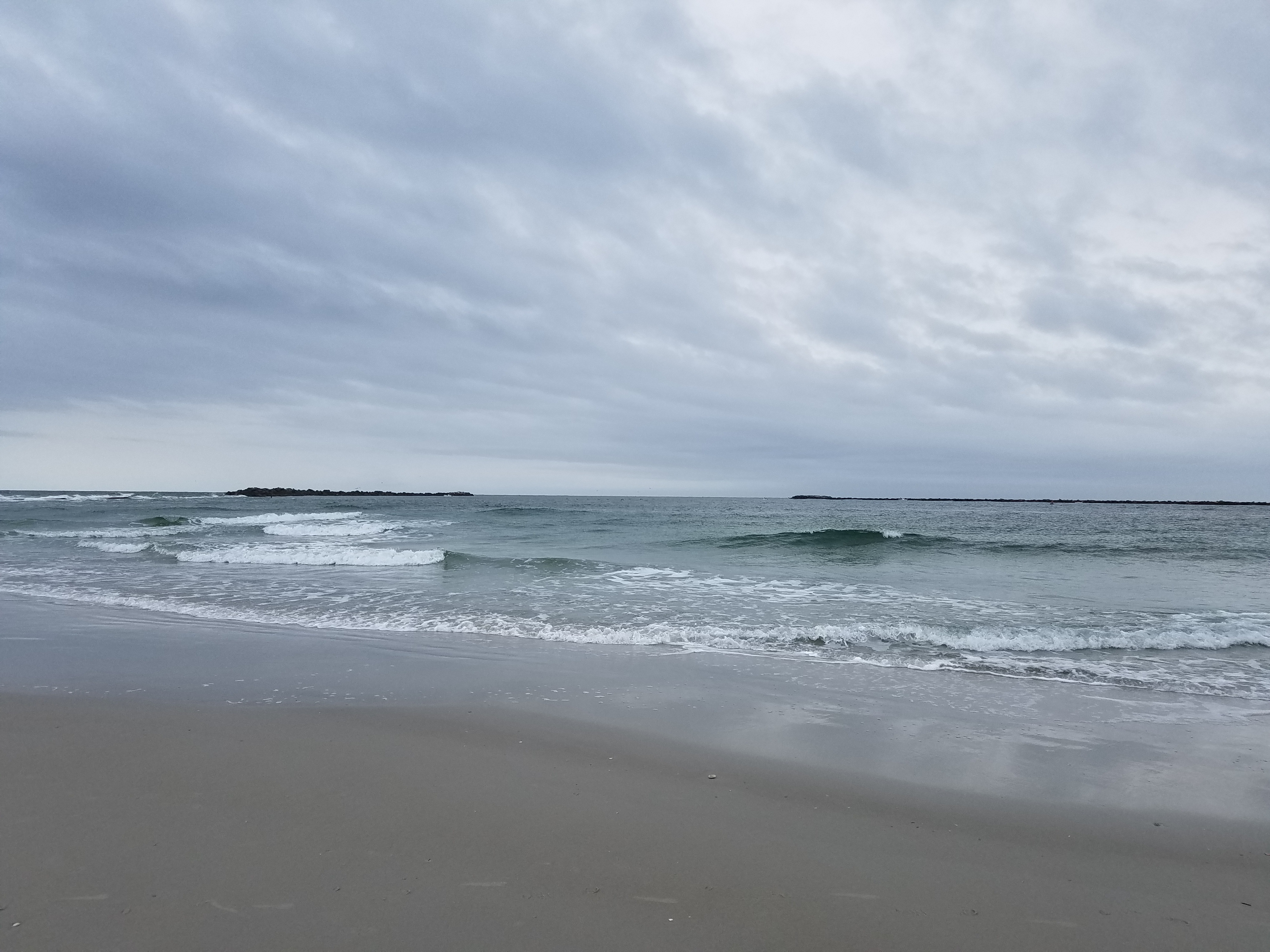
Masonboro inlet seaward direction with jetties

Masonboro Inlet is an inlet in New Hanover County, North Carolina, separating the town of Wrightsville Beach from Masonboro Island. The inlet was used as a hideout by Confederate blockade runners during the Civil War. The blockade runners would hide in the inlet until nightfall, then sail to the nearby port of Wilmington in the cover of darkness.
