= SS Bohemian (1859) =

British steamship that sank in 1864

Bohemian
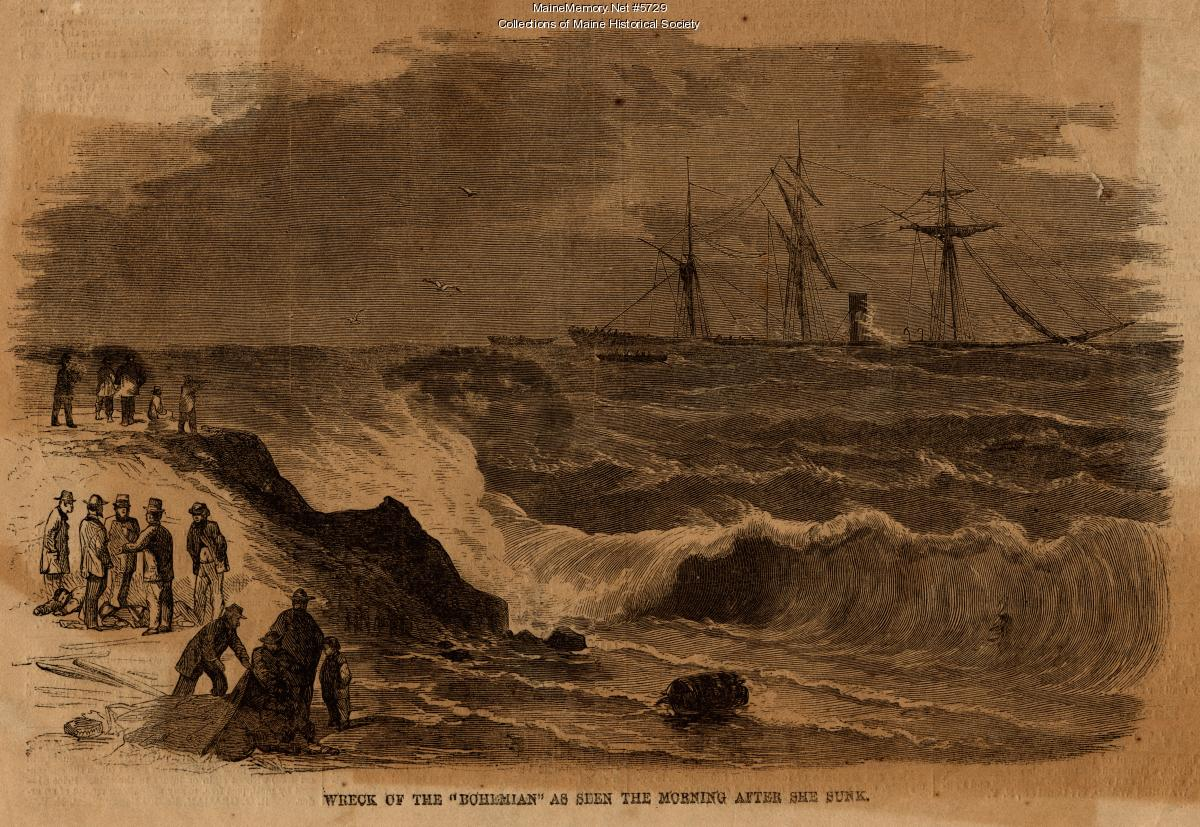
- An 1864 woodcut image of the wreck

History

United Kingdom
- Name: Bohemian
- Owner: Montreal Ocean Steamship Company
- Route: Liverpool – Quebec (summer); Liverpool – Portland (winter)
- Builder: William Denny and Brothers, Dumbarton, Scotland
- Yard number: 71
- Launched: 8 February 1859
- Sponsored by: Alison L. Galbraith
- Completed: 19 April 1859
- Identification: UK official number 27115
- Fate: Sunk on 22 February 1864 (162 years ago) in Casco Bay, Maine, U.S. at: 43°34′28″N 70°11′53″W

General characteristics
- Type: Screw steamer with auxiliary sails
- Tonnage: 2,189 GRT, 1,489 NRT
- Length: 294.3 feet (89.7 m)
- Beam: 37.7 feet (11.5 m)
- Draft: 20 feet (6.1 m)
- Depth: 26.3 feet (8.0 m)
- Decks: 3
- Installed power: Engine No. 56: direct acting, inverted, 2 cylinder, 339 nominal hp (253 kW)
- Propulsion: 1 screw
- Sail plan: Barque
- Speed: 13 knots (24 km/h; 15 mph) (est.)
- Capacity: 450 passengers
- Crew: 99
- Notes: 218 passengers onboard final voyage

SS Bohemian (Note: Some sources list Bohemian with a Royal Mail Ship (RMS) ship prefix.) was a British barque-rigged steamship in service from 1859 to 1864. She is remembered for having sunk in Casco Bay on approach to Portland, Maine, after striking an underwater ledge on 22 February 1864. The ensuing loss of 42 lives places it atop the list of disasters in Maine by death toll.

== Construction ==
The ship was built by William Denny and Brothers of Dumbarton, Scotland. She was launched on 8 February 1859, as reported in The Herald of Glasgow the following day. That report described her as being 2,200 gross tonnage, (Note: During the era that the ship was built, gross register tonnage (GRT) was in use; gross tonnage (GT) was defined in 1969 and came into force in 1982.) 300 feet (91 m) long, and outfitted with a 300 horsepower (220 kW) engine. (Note: The 1859 news report said "engines", but present-day reference sites indicate the ship had a single screw powered by a single engine.) Present-day reference sites give slightly different figures. A screw steamer, she was also outfitted with auxiliary sails as a barque. She was expected to have a passenger capacity of 450 when completed. Built for the Montreal Ocean Steamship Company (part of the Allan Line), she was the fourth such vessel launched at Dumbarton for the company in a 10-month span. (Note: Apparently the SS Nova Scotian (launched March 1858; yard no. 68), SS North Briton (June 1858; yard no. 69), and SS Hungarian (September 1858; yard no. 70), which Bohemian (February 1859; yard no. 71) was "built after the model of".)

== Service history ==
Bohemian began making transatlantic journeys by November 1859; she arrived in Portland, Maine, on the evening of 29 November, having left Liverpool, England, on the morning of 16 November. She subsequently departed Portland on 3 December (in place of the SS Indian, which had wrecked on 21 November) and arrived in Liverpool on 17 December. Bohemian was credited in several London newspapers for bringing news to England of the death of American abolitionist John Brown, who had been executed on 2 December in Virginia. (Note: The location where John Brown was executed is now part of West Virginia.)

In late February 1860, Bohemian departed Portland with a schooner in tow, to be dropped off at Barrington, Nova Scotia; the schooner was being sent to visit the wreck site of the SS Hungarian, which had sunk on 19 February at Cape Sable Island, Nova Scotia.

In early January 1862, a scheduled arrival of Bohemian in Portland was the subject of correspondence between William H. Seward, the Secretary of State, and Israel Washburn Jr., the Governor of Maine. In the context of the then-unresolved Trent Affair impacting UK–US relations, the question had arisen as to if Bohemian—with British troops onboard bound for Canada—would be allowed to land in Portland. Seward asserted that they would be allowed to land, a decision that he later explained in a detailed letter to Washburn.

On 15 December 1862, Bohemian rescued the crew of Marina, an English brig en route from Montreal to Scotland with grain as cargo, as she was sinking in the Atlantic Ocean at 55°N 17°W.

=== Sinking ===
On 22 February 1864, Bohemian was approaching the Port of Portland, having departed Liverpool on 4 February; she was five days overdue. Due to hazy conditions, captain Robert Borland struggled to gauge the ship's location off Cape Elizabeth. At approximately 8:00 p.m., the ship struck an underwater ledge approximately two miles (3.2 km) southeast of Cape Elizabeth. The captain ordered the ship to proceed at full speed to reach shallow water, until flooding seawater extinguished the ship's boilers. She was within one-quarter mile (0.40 km) of shore when headway was lost off of Maxwell Point. (Note: Maxwell Point is located at 43.5721°N 70.1998°W.) The captain then had anchors dropped and gave the order to abandon ship.

During the launching of lifeboats, panic among passengers caused one lifeboat to become overloaded; it fell from the ship and was swamped, resulting in 16 drownings. Of the 218 passengers and 99 crew onboard, most were brought to land by lifeboats, but 70 to 80 were still on the ship when it sank at 10:30 p.m. in five fathoms (30 ft; 9.1 m) of water, leaving the deck slightly above the sea. Returning lifeboats brought the remaining survivors to shore shortly before midnight. Eventually, the death toll was determined to be 42.

== In art ==
The 1939 mural Shipwreck at Night by Alzira Peirce depicts the wreck of the Bohemian—the mural is located inside a post office in South Portland, Maine.
