= List of shipwrecks in September 1860 =

The list of shipwrecks in September 1860 includes ships sunk, foundered, grounded, or otherwise lost during September 1860.

== 1 September ==
List of shipwrecks: 1 September 1860
Ship	State	Description
British Merchant	United Kingdom	The full-rigged ship was destroyed by fire at Sydney, New South Wales. Her 35 crew survived. She was on a voyage from Sydney to London.
Fabian	United Kingdom	The barque ran aground on the Shipwash Sand, in the North Sea off the coast of Suffolk. She was on a voyage from Sunderland, County Durham to Bordeaux, Gironde, France. She was refloated and resumed her voyage.
Lovely Cruiser	United Kingdom	The schooner sprang a leak and foundered in the North Sea off Orfordness, Suffolk. Her four crew were rescued. She was on a voyage from Sunderland to Caen, Calvados, France.

== 2 September ==
List of shipwrecks: 2 September 1860
Ship	State	Description
Bertha	Hamburg	The koff sank 5 nautical miles (9.3 km) off Christiansand, Norway. Her crew were rescued. She was on a voyage from Newcastle upon Tyne, Northumberland, United Kingdom to Saint Petersburg, Russia.
SMS Frauenlob	(Kingdom of Prussia) Prussian Navy	The schooner foundered off Yokohama, Japan, in a typhoon with the loss of all hands.
Jackson	United Kingdom	The brig ran aground on the Pampus, off the coast of Zeeland, Netherlands. She was on a voyage from Newcastle upon Tyne to Rotterdam, South Holland, Netherlands.
Nathaniel	United Kingdom	The brig was run into by Siam (United Kingdom) and was severely damaged in the English Channel. She was towed in to Dover, Kent in a sinking condition.

== 3 September ==
List of shipwrecks: 3 September 1860
Ship	State	Description
Anna	Norway	The ship was driven ashore and wrecked on Osmussaar, Russia. She was on a voyage from Newcastle upon Tyne, Northumberland, United Kingdom to Kronstadt, Russia.
Einigkeit	Sweden	The ship was driven ashore on the "Tytlars", off the coast of Sweden. Her crew were rescued. She was on a voyage from Grimsby, Lincolnshire, United Kingdom to Narva, Russia.
Julia	Netherlands	The ship ran aground at Arkhangelsk, Russia. She was on a voyage from Arkhangelsk to Amsterdam, North Holland. She was refloated and put back to Arkhangelsk.

== 4 September ==
List of shipwrecks: 4 September 1860
Ship	State	Description
Alexander	United Kingdom	The barque sank off Port William, Falkland Islands. Her thirteen crew were rescued. She was on a voyage from "Realijo", Chile to Liverpool, Lancashire.
Chesapeake	United States	The steamship was driven ashore on Tybee Island, Georgia.
Gondola	United Kingdom	The ship ran aground at North Shields, County Durham. She was on a voyage from North Shields to Genoa, Kingdom of Sardinia. She was refloated the next day and resumed her voyage.
Peter and Rebecca	United Kingdom	The ship was driven ashore at Vlissingen, Zeeland, Netherlands. She was on a voyage from Antwerp, Belgium to Gloucester.

== 5 September ==
List of shipwrecks: 5 September 1860
Ship	State	Description
Asia	United Kingdom	The steamship was severely damaged by an explosion of firedamp in her hold at Cardiff, Glamorgan. Eight crew were injured.
Catharina	Hamburg	The ewer collided with the steamship Ward Jackson (United Kingdom) and sank at Altona. Her crew were rescued.
Colonsay	United Kingdom	The full-rigged ship was lost in the Falkland Islands. Her seventeen crew survived.
Egyptian	United Kingdom	The barque collided with Chancellor (United States) and sank in the Atlantic Ocean. Her seventeen crew were rescued by Chancellor. Egyptian was on a voyage from Portsmouth, Hampshire to Quebec City, Province of Canada, British North America.
Guide	United States	The barque was wrecked at Ras Hafun, Majeerteen Sultanate. She was on a voyage from Zanzibar to Aden.

== 6 September ==
List of shipwrecks: 6 September 1860
Ship	State	Description
Hope	United Kingdom	The ship ran aground and sank at Faversham, Kent. She was on a voyage from Newcastle upon Tyne, Northumberland to Faversham.
Julia	United Kingdom	The ship foundered off Saugor, India. She was on a voyage from Bombay to Calcutta.
Orphan's Friend	United Kingdom	The brig foundered off Land's End, Cornwall. Her crew were rescued by two fishing boats. She was on a voyage from Cardiff, Glamorgan to London.
Sister	United Kingdom	The sloop sank in the Wester Tille. Her eight crew survived.

== 7 September ==
List of shipwrecks: 7 September 1860
Ship	State	Description
Eclipse	United Kingdom	The brig was destroyed by fire at Arkhangelsk, Russia. Her eleven crew survived.
Emerald	United Kingdom	The schooner was run down and sunk 20 nautical miles (37 km) north east by east of Sambro, Nova Scotia, British North America by the steamship America (United States). Her crew were rescued by America. Emerald was on a voyage from the Strait of Belle Isle to Barrington, Nova Scotia.
Fame	United Kingdom	The steamship was driven ashore near Robin Hoods Bay, Yorkshire. Her passengers were taken off. She was on a voyage from Scarborough to Whitby. She was refloated.

== 8 September ==
List of shipwrecks: 8 September 1860
Ship	State	Description
Amelia Hill	United Kingdom	The snow was wrecked in a gale at St. Ubes, Portugal; crew saved. She had run aground entering the port the previous day on a voyage from Sines, Portugal to the Clyde, had been refloated and found to be leaky.
Hero	United Kingdom	The schooner collided with the brigantine Ceres (United Kingdom) and sank in the Sound of Rathlin. Her four crew survived; two were rescued by Ceres, the others reached land in a boat. Hero was on a voyage from Glasgow, Renfrewshire to Londonderry.
Lady Elgin	United States	Illustration depicting the collision of Lady Elgin and Augusta from Frank Leslie's Illustrated Newspaper, 22 September 1860. The Gurdon Saltonstall Hubbard-owned sidewheel paddle steamer was accidentally rammed, broke up and sunk during a gale by the schooner Augusta (United States) in Lake Michigan off Highland Park, Illinois. There were in excess of 400 dead including her captain. 18 reached shore in two of her boats, 14 off a raft. About 25% of those on board survived.
Leopoldina	United Kingdom	The ship foundered north west of Cape Finisterre, Spain. Her crew were rescued. She was on a voyage from Tavira, Portugal to Silloth, Cumberland.

== 9 September ==
List of shipwrecks: 9 September 1860
Ship	State	Description
Conway	United Kingdom	The ship was abandoned in the Atlantic Ocean off Madeira. Her 38 crew and 326 passengers were rescued. She was on a voyage from Liverpool, Lancashire to Calcutta, India. Conway was discovered by the barques Isabella (Spain) and Onzana (France), whose crew started to strip her. She was surrendered to Home (United Kingdom), which put a crew on board and took her in to Barbados, where she arrived on 21 October. Subsequently salvaged and sold.
Mary Mitcheson	United Kingdom	The ship ran aground on the Filsand, in the Baltic Sea. She was on a voyage from Newcastle upon Tyne, Northumberland to Kronstadt, Russia. She was refloated and resumed her voyage in a leaky condition.

== 10 September ==
List of shipwrecks: 10 September 1860
Ship	State	Description
Alliance	United Kingdom	The ship was wrecked on a reef off Borkum, Denmark with the loss of all hands. She was on a voyage from Sunderland, County Durham to Geestemünde, Prussia.
John and Isabella	United Kingdom	The brig foundered in the Baltic Sea. Her seven crew were rescued by the steamship Stirling and/or by Clarke (both United Kingdom). John and Isabella was on a voyage from Sunderland to Kronstadt, Russia.
Lizzie Gardner	United Kingdom	The brigantine capsized at Saint John's, Antigua. She was on a voyage from Argyle, Nova Scotia, British North America to Antigua.

== 11 September ==
List of shipwrecks: 11 September 1860
Ship	State	Description
Adonis	United Kingdom	The schooner was abandoned off "Rogue's Island".
Glen Isla	United Kingdom	The full-rigged ship was driven ashore at "Rangafalla". Her 30 crew survived. She was on a voyage from London to Calcutta, India.
Hopewell	United Kingdom	The barque was wrecked on Kalpeni Island. Her nineteen crew survived. She was on a voyage from Bombay, India to London
Prince of Wales	United Kingdom	The steamship was wrecked on Inchmurran, in Loch Lomond. All on board were rescued. She was later refloated and taken in to Cameron Bay.

== 12 September ==
List of shipwrecks: 12 September 1860
Ship	State	Description
Ann Louise	United Kingdom	The full-rigged ship was driven ashore and wrecked at Schwarzort, Prussia. Her nine crew survived. She was on a voyage from Swinemünde to Memel.
Bartley	United Kingdom	The snow was wrecked on Farø, Denmark. Her ten crew survived. She was on a voyage from Nyköping, Sweden to Ventava, Courland Governorate.
Faith	United Kingdom	The schooner ran aground on the Cork Sand, in the North Sea off the coast of Essex. She was on a voyage from Maldon, Essex to South Shields, County Durham. She was refloated and put back to Maldon in a leaky condition.
Ino	United Kingdom	The barque ran aground on Smith's Knowl, in the North Sea off the coast of Norfolk. She was on a voyage from Cardiff, Glamorgan to Malmö. Sweden. She was refloated and taken in to Great Yarmouth, Norfolk in a leaky condition.
Sylph	United Kingdom	The schooner was driven ashore at Lowestoft, Suffolk. She was on a voyage from Falmouth, Cornwall to Hull, Yorkshire. She was refloated and resumed her voyage.
Worthy of Devon	United Kingdom	The barque was wrecked on Saaremaa, Russia. Her thirteen crew were rescued. She was on a voyage from Newcastle upon Tyne, Northumberland to Kronstadt, Russia.

== 13 September ==
List of shipwrecks: 13 September 1860
Ship	State	Description
Ceres	Norway	The ship was wrecked on "Maerko". Her crew were rescued. She was on a voyage from Sundsvall to Gloucester, United Kingdom.
Corsair	United Kingdom	The ship was wrecked at Auckland, New Zealand.
Euphrosine	Greece	The brig was driven ashore at Odesa.
Fanny	France	The barque was driven ashore and wrecked at Odesa.
Juno	Norway	The ship collided with Aurora (United Kingdom) and sank off Anticosti Island, Nova Scotia, British North America. Her crew were rescued.
Louisa	United Kingdom	The ship was wrecked at Auckland.
Nemesis	United Kingdom	The steamship was wrecked in the Raz de Sein. All on board were rescued. She was on a voyage from Liverpool, Lancashire to Bordeaux, Gironde.
Primera de Santander	Spain	The ship was driven ashore and wrecked at Zamboanga, Spanish East Indies. She was on a voyage from Hong Kong to Queenstown, County Cork United Kingdom.
Rotunda	United Kingdom	The ship foundered in the Atlantic Ocean. Her crew were rescued. She was on a voyage from Liverpool to New York, United States.
Rover's Bride	United Kingdom	The ship was wrecked at Auckland.

== 14 September ==
List of shipwrecks: 14 September 1860
Ship	State	Description
Bosphorus	United Kingdom	The barque was driven ashore at "Cape Hollanders". Her thirteen crew survived. She was on a voyage from British Honduras to a British port.
Harbinger	United Kingdom	The barque was wrecked on the Middle Bank, in the Bristol Channel. Her twelve crew survived. She was on a voyage from Cardiff, Glamorgan to Maranhão, Brazil.
Melona	United Kingdom	The brig was driven ashore and wrecked on Stoneskar, Russia. Her nine crew were rescued. She was on a voyage from Sunderland, County Durham to Kronstadt, Russia.
Mersey	United Kingdom	The Mersey Flat ran aground and sank at Conway, Caernarfonshire. Her crew survived. She was on a voyage from Rhuddlan, Denbighshire to Beaumaris, Anglesey.
Punjab	United Kingdom	The barque struck the Seven Stones reef, between the Isles of Scilly and Cornwall, England. All but one of her crew and passengers was rescued by the brig Joshua and Mary (United Kingdom) and landed at Falmouth, Cornwall. Punjab was on a voyage from Algoa Bay to Amsterdam, North Holland, the Netherlands, carrying 300 tons of wool and hides.
Surprise	United Kingdom	The schooner caught fire in the North Sea due to her cargo of quicklime getting wet from a leak. She was on a voyage from Wick, Caithness to Sunderland, County Durham. She put in to Fraserburgh, Aberdeenshire.

== 15 September ==
List of shipwrecks: 15 September 1860
Ship	State	Description
Leguan	United Kingdom	The full-rigged ship was destroyed by fire near Westport, County Mayo. Her sixteen crew survived. She was on a voyage from Grenada to the Clyde.
Nicolai	Russia	The ship sprang a leak off "Egholm" and was abandoned. She was on a voyage from Saint Petersburg to Reval.

== 16 September ==
List of shipwrecks: 16 September 1860
Ship	State	Description
Bell	United Kingdom	The brig foundered in the Atlantic Ocean. Her eight crew were rescued by Margaritha (Flag unknown). Bell was on a voyage from Huelva, Spain to Glasgow, Renfrewshire.
Donnerstag	Danzig	The full-rigged ship was driven ashore at Redcar, Yorkshire, United Kingdom. She was on a voyage from Chatham, Kent to Danzig. She was refloated and taken in to Hartlepool, County Durham, United Kingdom in a leaky condition.
Lynus	United Kingdom	The steamship was driven ashore at Dundalk, County Louth. She was refloated.
Panic	United Kingdom	The ship caught fire at Hong Kong and was scuttled. She was refloated on 28 September.
Shepherdess	United Kingdom	The full-rigged ship was abandoned at sea. Her 52 crew survived. She was on a voyage from Akyab, Burma to Liverpool, Lancashire.

== 17 September ==
List of shipwrecks: 17 September 1860
Ship	State	Description
Almuth	United Kingdom	The full-rigged ship sank off Thisted, Denmark. Her crew survived.
Independence	United States	The schooner was wrecked at Ship Island, Mississippi. Her crew were rescued.
Sir John Brooke	United Kingdom	The steamship struck a sunken rock off Point Rouminea, Straits Settlements and was beached. She was on a voyage from Bangkok, Siam to Singapore, Straits Settlements.
Wilhelmina Frederika	Netherlands	The ship was driven ashore and wrecked at Castricum, North Holland. All on board were rescued. She was on a voyage from Surinam to Amsterdam, North Holland.

== 18 September ==
List of shipwrecks: 18 September 1860
Ship	State	Description
Cincinatus	United Kingdom	The full-rigged ship was destroyed by fire at sea. She was on a voyage from Sunderland, County Durham to Calcutta, India.
John James	(United Kingdom of Great Britain and Ireland) Isle of Man	The smack was driven ashore at Dundalk, County Louth. She was refloated with the assistance of the Dundalk Lifeboat.
Warrior	United Kingdom	The steamship ran onto a rock at Gran Canaria, Canary Islands. All on board were rescued. She was on a voyage from Tenerife, Canary Islands to Mogadore, Morocco. She had become a wreck by 25 September.

== 19 September ==
List of shipwrecks: 19 September 1860
Ship	State	Description
Aurora	United Kingdom	The barque was wrecked at the mouth of the Hooghly River. All on board were rescued. She was on a voyage from London to Calcutta, India.
Coral Isle	United Kingdom	The barque was driven ashore and wrecked in the Strait of Belle Isle. She was on a voyage from Liverpool, Lancashire to Montreal, Province of Canada, British North America
Eliza	United Kingdom	The ship sprang a leak and was beached at Newport, Monmouthshire. She was on a voyage from Gloucester to Quebec City, Province of Canada, British North America.
Esmerelda	United Kingdom	The ship was driven ashore at Tilbury, Essex. She was on a voyage from New York, United States to London. She was refloated the next day and taken in to Gravesend, Kent.

== 20 September ==
List of shipwrecks: 20 September 1860
Ship	State	Description
Daniel Hill	United Kingdom	The schooner was wrecked on Monhegan Island, Maine, United States.
Frederick Griffiths	(United Kingdom of Great Britain and Ireland) New South Wales	The schooner sank off Nobbys Head.
Mary	United Kingdom	The barque was wrecked at Cape North, Nova Scotia, British North America with the loss of nine of her fourteen crew. She was on a voyage from London to Quebec City, Province of Canada, British North America.

== 21 September ==
List of shipwrecks: 21 September 1860
Ship	State	Description
Charles Tennant	United Kingdom	The schooner foundered in the North Sea off Whitby, Yorkshire. Her five crew were rescued by the steamship Tees (United Kingdom. Charles Tennane was on a voyage from the River Tees to Geestemünde, Prussia.

== 22 September ==
List of shipwrecks: 22 September 1860
Ship	State	Description
Ellen	United Kingdom	The schooner collided with the schooner Sealer (United Kingdom) and sank west of Ailsa Craig. Her crew were rescued by Sealer. Ellen was on a voyage from Troon, Ayrshire to Londonderry.
Hero of Kars	United Kingdom	The brig ran aground on the Inner Shoal, in the North Sea off the coast of Suffolk. She was on a voyage from South Shields, County Durham to Alexandria, Egypt. She was refloated and taken in to Lowestoft, Suffolk.
Maria Bergita Celia	Sweden	The steam yacht collided with the steamship Adler (Bremen) and sank off the mouth of the Humber with the loss of two of her crew. Survivors were rescued by Adler. Maria Bergita Celia was on a voyage from Stockholm to Hull, Yorkshire, United Kingdom.
Neptune's Bride	United States	The fishing schooner ran aground and sank on Malcomb's Ledge, Maine in rain, fog and heavy seas. Lost with 12 of 14 crew, one crewman rescued from the masts by a boat from shore and the other survivor from her boat by a passing schooner from Belfast.
Queen of the Seas	United States	The full-rigged ship foundered in the South China Sea off Formosa in a typhoon with the loss of all hands. She was on a voyage from Liverpool, Lancashire, United Kingdom to Shanghai, China.
Wanderer	United Kingdom	The steamboat was run into by the steamship Champion (United Kingdom) and sank in the River Tyne. Her five crew were rescued by Champion.

== 23 September ==
List of shipwrecks: 23 September 1860
Ship	State	Description
Carlotta	United Kingdom	The ship was driven ashore at Cagliari, Sardinia. Her crew were rescued. She was on a voyage from Constantinople, Ottoman Empire to a British port.
Corcyra	United Kingdom	The brig was wrecked at the Point of Jambrona. She was on a voyage from Badong, Bali, Spanish East Indies to Singapore, Straits Settlements.
Five Sisters	United Kingdom	The ship departed from West Hartlepool, County Durham for London. No further trace, presumed foundered with the loss of all hands.
Victoria	United Kingdom	The steamship was driven ashore at Trelleborg, Sweden. She was on a voyage from Cardiff, Glamorgan to Kronstadt, Russia. She was later refloated and taken in to Copenhagen, Denmark, where she arrived in a leaky condition on 26 September.

== 24 September ==
List of shipwrecks: 24 September 1860
Ship	State	Description
A. B. Chambers	United States	The steamboat sank in the Missouri River near St. Charles, Missouri.
Acorn	United Kingdom	The ship was driven ashore at Sutton-on-Sea, Lincolnshire. She was on a voyage from London to Louth, Lincolnshire.
Jantina	Netherlands	The ship was driven ashore on Læsø, Denmark. She was on a voyage from Amsterdam, North Holland to Stockholm, Sweden.
Linda	United Kingdom	The barque was wrecked on the Goodwin Sands, Kent. Her nine crew were rescued by the lifeboat Northumberland (United Kingdom). She was on a voyage from Middlesbrough, Yorkshire to Alexandria, Egypt. The wreck was refloated on 29 September and beached at Margate, Kent.
Providence	United Kingdom	The schooner departed from Rosedale for Newcastle upon Tyne, Northumberland. Subsequently foundered in the North Sea off the coast of Yorkshire with the loss of all four crew.
Triton	Netherlands	The barque ran aground on the Taepingas Island Reefs and was abandoned by her crew. She was on a voyage from Hong Kong to Kanagawa, Japan.

== 25 September ==
List of shipwrecks: 25 September 1860
Ship	State	Description
Ætna	United Kingdom	The brig ran aground on the Haisborough Sands, in the North Sea off the coast of Norfolk. She was on a voyage from Hull, Yorkshire to Trieste. She was refloated and taken in to Great Yarmouth, Norfolk.
Amelia	United Kingdom	The barque was driven ashore and wrecked at Dungeness, Kent. Her seven crew were rescued. She was on a voyage from Havre de Grâce, Seine-Inférieure, France to Newcastle upon Tyne, Northumberland.
Anna Maria	France	The schooner was wrecked on the Owers Sandbank, in the English Channel off the coast of Sussex, United Kingdom. Her crew were rescued by the schooner Georgine (Denmark). Anna Maria was on a voyage from Honfleur, Manche to Sunderland, County Durham, United Kingdom. She was towed in to Newhaven, Sussex in a derelict condition the next day.
Ariel	Sweden	The barque was wrecked on the Goodwin Sands, Kent, United Kingdom. Her thirteen crew were rescued by the lifeboat Northumberland (United Kingdom). She was on a voyage from Härnösand to Marseille, Bouches-du-Rhône, France. Ariel was refloated the next day and towed in to Ramsgate, Kent.
Choice	United Kingdom	The snow was driven ashore and wrecked on Saaremaa, Russia. Her eight crew were rescued. She was on a voyage from Newcastle upon Tyne to Kronstadt, Russia.
Engelina	Kingdom of Hanover	The ship was driven ashore and wrecked on Borkum, Denmark. Her crew were rescued. She was on a voyage from Middlesbrough, Yorkshire, United Kingdom to Emden.
Falcon	United Kingdom	The brig ran aground off Düne, Heligoland. She was on a voyage from Hamburg to an English port.
Friends	United Kingdom	The schooner was driven ashore and damaged at Grainthorpe, Lincolnshire. She was on a voyage from King's Lynn, Norfolk to Stockton-on-Tees, County Durham. She was later refloated and taken in to Grimsby.
Friendship	United Kingdom	The schooner was driven ashore and sank at Grimsby, Lincolnshire. Eight people were rescued. She was on a voyage from Grimsby to Leeds, Yorkshire.
George Andreas	United Kingdom	The ship was abandoned in the Swin. Her seven crew were rescued by the steamship Doris (United Kingdom). George Andreas was on a voyage from Hartlepool, County Durham to London.
Jay	United Kingdom	The ship was driven ashore and wrecked at North Coates, Lincolnshire. She was on a voyage from Hartlepool, County Durham to Wells-next-the-Sea, Norfolk.
Mary	United Kingdom	The ship was driven ashore at Hartlepool.
Nautilus	United Kingdom	The ship was driven ashore at Thorpeness, Suffolk. Her crew were rescued. She was on a voyage from Seaham, County Durham to London.
Poseidon	Norway	The brig was wrecked on the Goodwin Sands. Her ten crew and the ship's dog were rescued by the lugger Diana (United Kingdom).
Red Rover	United Kingdom	The schooner foundered in the North Sea. Her crew were rescued by Brutus (United Kingdom). Red Rover was on a voyage from South Shields, County Durham to Rochester, Kent.
Renard	(United Kingdom of Great Britain and Ireland) Jersey	The schooner was driven ashore and wrecked at Dover, Kent. Her crew were rescued. She was on a voyage from Southampton, Hampshire to Seaham, County Durham.
Tay	United Kingdom	The schooner was driven ashore and wrecked at Grainthorpe. She was on a voyage from Hartlepool, County Durham to Wells-next-the-Sea, Norfolk.

== 26 September ==
List of shipwrecks: 26 September 1860
Ship	State	Description
Amelia	United Kingdom	The barque foundered in the Dogger Bank (55°15′N 4°19′E. Her eight crew were rescued by a Norwegian brig. She was on a voyage from Hartlepool, County Durham to Altona.
Anna Maria	France	The schooner was abandoned in the English Channel. She was on a voyage from Harfleur, Manche to Newcastle upon Tyne, Northumberland, United Kingdom. Anna Maria was subsequently towed in to Newhaven, Sussex, United Kingdom by Donegal (United Kingdom).
Atalanta	United Kingdom	The schooner ran aground on the Wollies, in the Bristol Channel and sank. Her crew were rescued. She was on a voyage from Newport, Monmouthshire to London.
Barbadian	United Kingdom	The full-rigged ship collided with another vessel in the English Channel off the coast of Dorset and was abandoned. The other vessel sank. Barbadian's crew survived. She was on a voyage from London to Greenock, Renfrewshire. She was subsequently taken in tow by five fishing smacks.
Borderer	United Kingdom	The barque was abandoned at sea. Her fifteen crew survived. She was on a voyage from Akyab, Burma to Falmouth, Cornwall.
Clementina	United Kingdom	The ship was driven ashore near the Clit Rock, on the coast of Devon and wrecked.
Effort	United Kingdom	The ship was driven ashore on Gotland, Sweden. Her crew were rescued. She was on a voyage from Saint Petersburg, Russia to Leith, Lothian. She was refloated and taken in to Visby, Sweden in a leaky condition.
Filice	France	The brig ran aground on the Longsand, in the North Sea off the coast of Essex, United Kingdom. She was on a voyage from Sarpsborg, Norway to Nantes, Loire-Inférieure. She was refloated and assisted in to Harwich, Essex in a waterlogged condition.
Hano	Hamburg	The ship sank in the North Sea. She was on a voyage from Newcastle upon Tyne to Hamburgh.
John Evans	United Kingdom	The schooner collided with Sarah Chase in the Irish Sea off Bardsey Island, Pembrokeshire and sank. Her four crew were rescued by Sarah Chase (United Kingdom). John Evans was on a voyage from Ardrossan, Ayrshire to Bayonne, Basses-Pyrénées, France.
Tonkes	Kingdom of Hanover	The koff foundered in the North Sea. Her crew were rescued. She was on a voyage from Newcastle upon Tyne to Hamburg.
Wakefield	United Kingdom	The brig sprang a leak and foundered in the North Sea 25 nautical miles (46 km) east by south of Flamborough Head, Yorkshire. Her crew were rescued by the smack Sir George Seymour (United Kingdom). Wakefield was on a voyage from Sunderland, County Durham to London.

== 27 September ==
List of shipwrecks: 27 September 1860
Ship	State	Description
Amarite	United Kingdom	The whaler, a schooner, was lost in the Cumberland Strait.
Aurora	United Kingdom	The ship foundered in the Dogger Bank. She was on a voyage from Hartlepool, County Durham to Altona.
Catharina	Belgium	The ship departed from a port in Haiti for Antwerp. No further trace, presumed foundered with the loss of all hands.
Chamois	(United Kingdom of Great Britain and Ireland) British North America	The schooner capsized in a squall east of Saint Thomas, Virgin Islands with the loss of all but one of her crew. She was on a voyage from Saint Thomas to Inagua, Bahamas.
Dispatch	United Kingdom	The brig was driven ashore at Egmond aan Zee, North Holland, Netherlands with the loss of six of her seven crew. She was on a voyage from Sunderland, County Durham to Rotterdam, South Holland, Netherlands.
Velocity	United Kingdom	The brigantine was wrecked near Saint Thomas.

== 28 September ==
List of shipwrecks: 28 September 1860
Ship	State	Description
Maria	United Kingdom	The ship departed from Constantinople, Ottoman Empire for a British port. No further trace, presumed foundered with the loss of all hands.
Reine des Anges	France	The schooner was discovered derelict in the North Sea by Solon (United Kingdom). She was on a voyage from Riga, Russia to Havre de Grâce, Seine-Inférieure. She was taken in to Dover, Kent, United Kingdom.

== 29 September ==
List of shipwrecks: 29 September 1860
Ship	State	Description
Helene	Flag unknown	The ship departed from Warkworth, Northumberland, United Kingdom for Riga, Russia. No further trace, presumed foundered with the loss of all hands.
Hermina	United Kingdom	The ship departed from Newcastle upon Tyne, Northumberland for Itzehoe, Duchy of Schleswig. No further trace, presumed foundered with the loss of all hands.
Margaretta Catharina	Netherlands	The ship was sighted off Helsingør, Denmark whilst on a voyage from Saint Petersburg, Russia to Harlingen, Friesland. No further trace, presumed foundered with the loss of all hands.
William's Adventure	United Kingdom	The ship ran aground and was holed at Deal, Kent. She was consequently beached. She was on a voyage from Newcastle upon Tyne to Deal.

== 30 September ==
List of shipwrecks: 30 September 1860
Ship	State	Description
Rustico	United Kingdom	The schooner was abandoned off Saint-Pierre.
Prosper	United Kingdom	The ship was sighted in the Øresund whilst on a voyage from Saint Petersburg, Russia to London. No further trace, presumed foundered with the loss of all hands.

== Unknown date ==
List of shipwrecks: Unknown date in September 1860
Ship	State	Description
Adam Young	United Kingdom	The schooner struck the Holm Sand, in the North Sea off the coast of Suffolk and sank. Her four crew were rescued by a Pakefield yawl.
Africa	United States	The ship ran aground in the Gaspar Strait. She was on a voyage from Cardiff, Glamorgan, United Kingdom to Shanghai, China. She was attacked by pirates and set afire. Her crew survived.
HMS Camilla	Royal Navy	The Helena-class brig disappeared without trace after departing Hakodate, Japan, on 1 September bound for Edo, and/or Kanagawa Japan. She presumably foundered with the loss of all hands in a typhoon on or about 9 September.
Edith	United Kingdom	The ship ran aground on Jordan's Bank, in Liverpool Bay. She was on a voyage from Liverpool, Lancashire to Dordrecht, South Holland, Netherlands. She was refloated and beached at Egremont, Lancashire.
Fraanchod	Russia	The schooner foundered in a typhoon in the Bay of Yedo.
Jacoba Margaretha	Netherlands	The ship foundered. She was on a voyage from Antwerp, Belgium to Smyrna, Ottoman Empire.
Jeannie	Austrian Empire	The barque was driven ashore at West Hartlepool, County Durham, United Kingdom. She was on a voyage from Feodosiya, Russia to West Hartlepool.
King Philip	United Kingdom	The full-rigged ship departed from London to Calcutta, India in late September. No further trace, presumed foundered with loss of all hands.
USS Levant	United States Navy	The sloop-of-war departed from Hilo, Kingdom of Hawaii for Panama on 18 October and vanished, lost with all 155 hands. Wreckage washed ashore near Hilo, there had been a hurricane in the area.
Marine	United Kingdom	The ship ran aground off Hogland, Russia. She was on a voyage from Liverpool to Kronstadt, Russia. She was refloated and resumed her voyage, arriving at Kronstadt on 26 September in a leaky condition.
Mars	United Kingdom	The smack was run down and sunk off "Noreland" by the steamship Cossack (United Kingdom with the loss of two of her three crew.
Moses Taylor	United Kingdom	The ship was driven ashore at Natashquan, Province of Canada, British North America. She was on a voyage from Quebec City, Province of Canada to Liverpool.
Walmer Castle	India	The transport ship foundered between 2 and 17 September.
Washington	Norway	The brig was discovered derelict in the North Sea by the steamship Svea (Sweden). She was towed in to Gothenburg, Sweden on 15 September.
