= Downeast Airlines Flight 46 =

1979 aviation accident

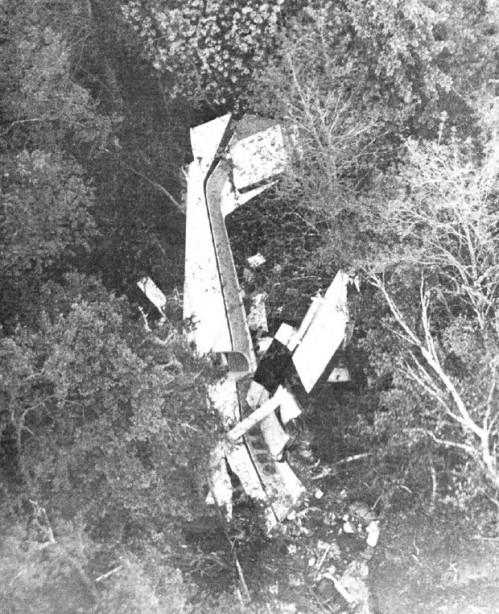
- The wreckage on the crash site

Accident
- Date: May 30, 1979
- Summary: Controlled flight into terrain
- Site: Near Knox County Regional Airport Rockland, Maine, United States; 44.02°N 69.06°W

Aircraft
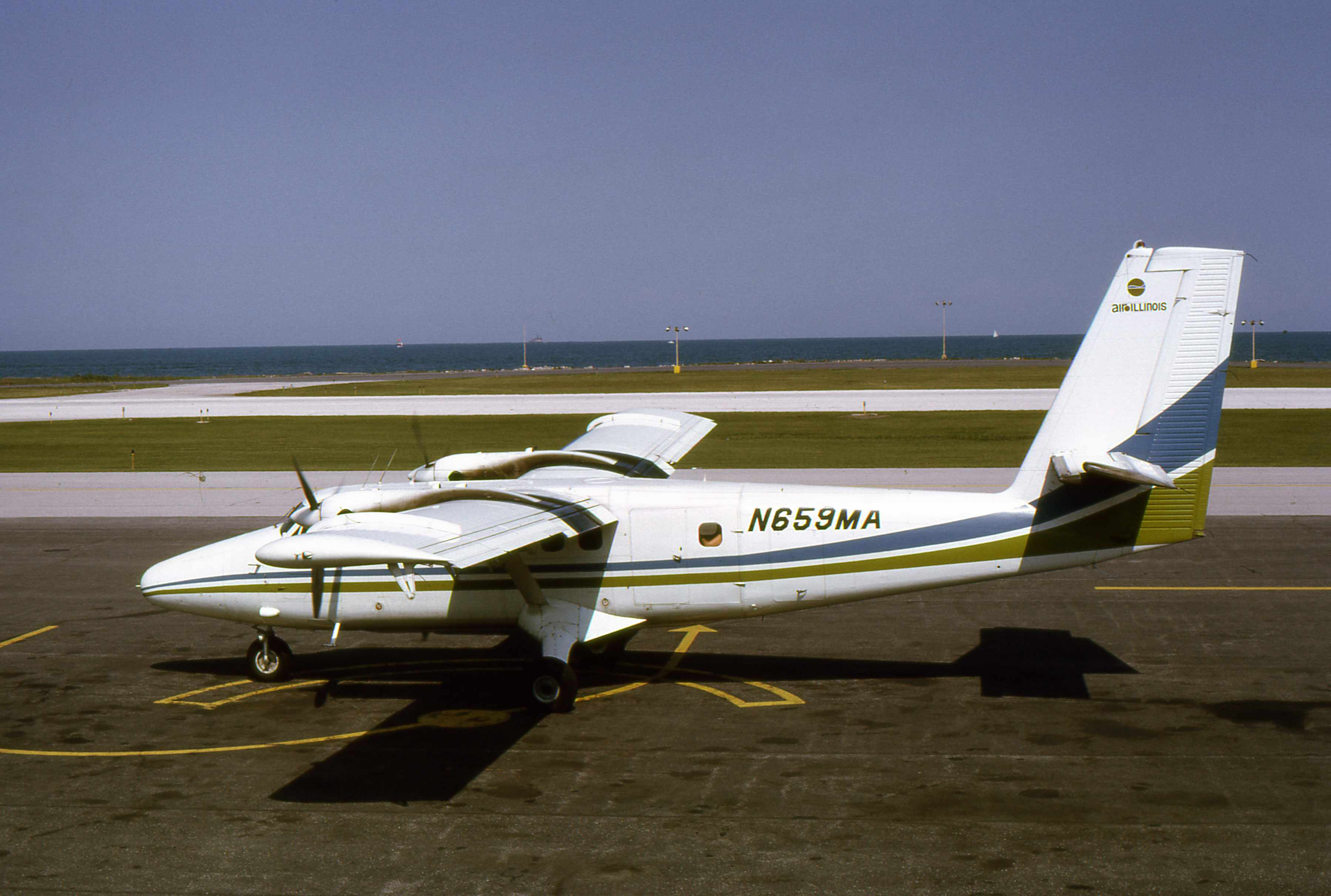
- The aircraft involved in the crash pictured in 1973, then operated by Air Illinois
- Aircraft type: DHC-6 Twin Otter Series 200
- Operator: Downeast Airlines
- Registration: N68DE
- Flight origin: Logan International Airport; Boston, Massachusetts, United States
- Destination: Knox County Regional Airport; Rockland, Maine, United States
- Passengers: 16
- Crew: 2
- Fatalities: 17
- Injuries: 1
- Survivors: 1

Downeast Airlines Flight 46 was a scheduled airline service in the United States from Boston's Logan International Airport to Rockland, Maine, operated by Downeast Airlines. On May 30, 1979, the de Havilland Canada DHC-6 Twin Otter operating the flight crashed during a nonprecision approach to Rockland's Knox County Regional Airport. All but one of the 18 people on board were killed. The cause of the accident was controlled flight into terrain (CFIT) after the failure of the flight crew to stop the aircraft's descent below the minimum descent altitude for the non-precision approach at Knox County airport. The investigation into the accident looked into the airline's corporate culture as a contributing factor to the crash; this was the first time an investigation took this approach to an air crash.

The crash of Flight 46 is currently the deadliest commercial air crash to have occurred in the state of Maine and second deadliest overall behind a military aircraft crash in 1944. At the time of the crash, the crew had descended the Twin Otter below the minimum descent altitude in order to see the runway in heavy fog.

== Airport and weather ==
There was poor visibility around Rockland on the night of the crash. Fog was extremely common at Knox County Regional Airport because of its position on a peninsula in Penobscot Bay. The weather observer at the airport used markers to the north and west of the airport to determine visibility, but approaches were from the south to the airport's Runway 3. The approach path was over the Atlantic Ocean, and fog is often thicker over the sea than over land.

=== Approach ===
At the time, Runway 3 had a set of flashing strobe lights leading to the runway, which could be activated by either the flight crew or the company agent stationed at the airport.

== Downeast Airlines management ==
The airline was established by Robert Stenger in the 1960s. Originally, Stenger flew, refueled and loaded passenger luggage onto the aircraft, and his wife would sell tickets. As the airline grew, he hired more pilots and acquired more equipment, but found himself ill-prepared to manage staff. In addition, the airline had trouble recruiting pilots with experience of flying in the bad weather frequently found in Maine. Retired Rockland Police Chief Alfred Ockenfels, who flew for Downeast, said, "Stenger was a guy that didn't suffer fools gladly; he barked at you...but he never told anyone to go below the [altitude] minimums." Some pilots for the airline felt that Stenger took any delay or problem as a personal attack, or an attack against the company. Around the time of the crash, several senior pilots had left the company due to Stenger's management style.

=== Pilot training ===
Although the Company operations manual expressed the need for coordination between the Captain and First Officer during flight, duties were not clearly distributed between the pilot in command and first officer. Pilots for the airline received minimal training, and some deadhead flights marked as training time did not actually include any training.

== Aircraft operation and maintenance ==
The aircraft involved in the accident, a twin-engine turboprop, was known to have a right engine that ran hotter and used more fuel in flight than the left engine. In addition to the high fuel flow and oil temperature in the right engine, the aircraft had poor cockpit lighting at night. Observation flights by the National Transportation Safety Board (NTSB) investigators found that errors in flap settings due to poor lighting were common on Twin Otters during night flights. The area around the flap control overhead was not illuminated; and the flap position indicator on the windscreen center post was poorly illuminated to the point of being barely visible. Some of the lights in the engine gauges had been incorrectly replaced with red, instead of white bulbs, making the gauges hard to see. Pilots had requested the maintenance crew standardize on one color of light bulb, but this had not been done at the time of the accident. Among Downeast pilots, there was discussion of the first officer's altimeter sticking and indicating as much as a 100 ft (30m) difference in altitude compared to the pilot's altimeter during descent and ascent. There was no formal record of the altimeter problem in the aircraft's logbooks, but investigators were told that it had been checked during an inspection in the past with no defects found.

=== Crew ===
At the time of the crash, the captain, 35-year-old James Merryman, was the chief pilot of the airline and was responsible for recruiting, selecting and training new pilots for the airline. He had 17 years experience as a pilot, but less than a year's experience as a chief pilot. His friends and family told investigators that in the weeks before the crash, he was exhibiting symptoms of extreme stress. The first officer, 39-year-old George Hines, had been with the airline for two months and had only flown single-engine aircraft before joining Downeast. He was reported to have had problems with instrument approaches in the past, including excessive rates of descent. Examination of the crew members' bodies after the crash determined that the First Officer was likely flying at the time of the crash, as he had suffered a broken thumb.

== Sole survivor ==
Of the 16 passengers and two aircrew aboard the flight, all but one perished in the crash. Sixteen-year-old John McCafferty was returning from Florida and his parents were waiting for him at the Owls Head Airport. Seated in the rear of the plane, McCafferty briefly saw trees through the fog just before the crash. After impact, he was able to crawl from the wreckage with a broken arm and leg. He also had his scalp torn from his forehead.

Thirty years later, McCafferty still had nightmares relating it to post-traumatic stress. "Nobody wanted that crash to happen. It's unfortunate that it did. It changed the lives of a lot of people," he said. "It's an awful feeling. I sometimes feel that I'm being haunted. Like there are people around me sometimes that I don't see. There is a God, I can tell you that."

== In media ==
The PBS series Nova featured the crash in season 2, episode 2, of the TV show Why Planes Crash, in an episode called "Brush With Death".

== See also ==
- List of aviation accidents and incidents with a sole survivor
- List of disasters in Maine by death toll
