= Onawa, Maine =

- Unincorporated community
- Location within Maine
- Coordinates: 45°22′1″N 69°22′19″W
- Country: United States
- State: Maine
- County: Piscataquis
- Elevation: 617 ft (188 m)
- Time zone: UTC-5 (Eastern (EST))
  - Summer (DST): UTC-4 (EDT)
- Area code: 207
- GNIS ID: 579590

Onawa is an unincorporated community and populated place in the U.S. state of Maine. It is located next to Lake Onawa and lies along the former route of the International Railway of Maine.

In December 1919, a major train wreck occurred two miles (3.2 km) west of the Onawa railway stop, resulting in 23 deaths.

The Onawa trestle was built in 1930 for the Canadian Pacific Railway. From 1942 until the conclusion of World War II in 1945, the all-Black 366th Infantry Regiment guarded the remote bridge.
