= USS Nita =

Gunboat of the United States Navy

History

United States
- Acquired: 10 September 1863
- Commissioned: 8 January 1864
- Decommissioned: 3 May 1865
- Captured: by Union Navy forces, 17 August 1863
- Fate: Sold, 3 May 1865

General characteristics
- Displacement: 210 tons
- Length: 146 ft (45 m)
- Beam: 22 ft 4 in (6.81 m)
- Draft: 5 ft (1.5 m)
- Depth of hold: 7 ft (2.1 m)
- Propulsion: steam engine; side-wheel propelled
- Complement: 46
- Armament: one 12-pounder howitzer; two heavy 12-pounder smoothbore guns

USS Nita was a captured Confederate steamer acquired by the Union Navy from the prize court during the American Civil War. She was put into service by the Union Navy to patrol navigable waterways of the Confederacy to prevent the South from trading with other countries.

== Service history ==
Nita, a wooden sidewheel steamer built in 1856 at Mobile, Alabama, was captured while carrying food and medicine from Havana, Cuba, toward Mobile, Alabama, by Union blockading schooner USS De Soto 17 August 1863. Taken to Key West, Florida, under a prize crew, Nita was condemned by a prize court; transferred to the Navy 10 September 1863; and commissioned 8 January 1864, Actg. Vol. Lt. Robert B. Smith in command. Assigned to the East Gulf Blockading Squadron, Nita patrolled the west coast of Florida for the remainder of the Civil War, operating primarily between the mouth of the Suwannee River and the Anclote Keys. On the morning of 24 February, Lt. Smith, alerted by Union intelligence agents in Cuba, spotted steamer Nan Nan, laden with cotton, attempting to slip to sea through the east pass of the Suwannee River. Nita at once gave chase. Twice she ran aground in the shallow coastal waters, but forced Nan Nan to throw her cotton overboard in attempting to escape. The blockade runner then stranded on the beach where her crew burned her to prevent capture.

Boats from Nita took her next prize, schooner Three Brothers, 11 April, at the mouth of the Homosassa River after a chase of three hours. The schooner had been attempting to slip into the river laden with supplies from Havana. Nita took her final ship on the morning of 24 October when two of her boats boarded abandoned and burning schooner Unknown off Clearwater Harbor. They promptly put out the fire and sent the prize to Key West, Florida, for adjudication. On 12 November Nita and USS Hendrick Hudson steamed to Tampa Bay on a reconnaissance mission and landed a party to destroy Confederate salt works near Rocky Point, Florida. However, the sailors were driven back by Southern cavalry. Early on 3 December, Nita and four other Union ships returned and destroyed the salt works. The efficiency of the Union Navy throughout the war made prizes scarce during the conflict's final months. Nita continued patrolling along the coast until she decommissioned at Key West 3 May 1865, and was sold at public auction the same day.

== See also ==
- Blockade runners of the American Civil War
- Blockade mail of the Confederacy
