= 1933 Belfast, Maine shooting =

Mass shooting in Maine

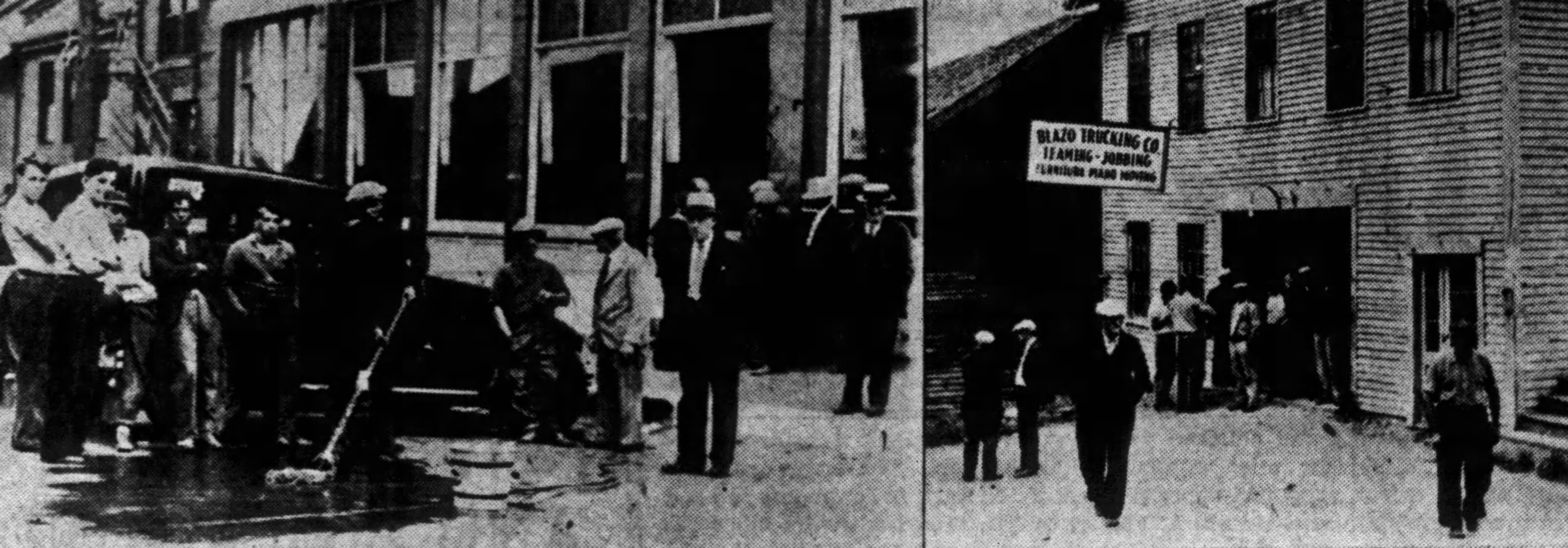
- Herbert Ellis murder location (left) and Blazo Trucking Co. office (right)

- Belfast (Maine) Belfast (the United States)
- Location: Belfast, Maine, United States
- Date: September 8, 1933 c. 1:00 p.m. (EST)
- Attack type: Mass murder, mass shooting, murder–suicide
- Weapons: Shotgun; Two .45-caliber automatic revolvers
- Deaths: 5 (including the perpetrator)
- Injuries: 0
- Perpetrator: Adrian F. Jones
- Motive: Grudges + mental instability

On September 8, 1933, a mass shooting occurred in Belfast, Maine, United States. That afternoon, 66-year-old Adrian F. Jones fatally shot four men with a shotgun on the streets of the city before barricading himself in a blacksmith shop, where he shot himself in the head with a revolver. Jones harbored grudges against some of the victims, and that, coupled with his mental instability, was the likeliest motive behind the shooting.

== Shooting ==
On September 8, 1933, Jones armed himself with a shotgun, a .38-caliber Winchester rifle, and 500 rounds of ammunition before leaving his house at about noon. He was wearing an overcoat. In his pockets were two automatic revolvers. He carried his shotgun over his shoulder while his rifle was in a case.

Jones arrived at the corner of High and Main streets a few minutes before 1 o'clock. There, he walked up behind 65-year-old Herbert E. Ellis and fired eight buckshots into the man's back, two of which pierced through his chest. Ellis subsequently fell down and died in a pool of his blood.

Jones then walked down to Washington Street. When he was 50 feet away from the Blazo Trucking Company office, he fired more shots, which hit three men talking to each other in front of the building: 73-year-old William W. Blazo, the owner of the company; 37-year-old Raymond Blazo, William's son; and 57-year-old Reginald B. Stanhope, a veterinarian whose office was directly above Blazo's.

Raymond Blazo died almost instantly after being shot twice in the chest, while his father was mortally wounded from injuries to the arm, chest, and abdomen. Stanhope was shot in the neck, a lung, and a kidney, and died two hours after the shooting. Another man in the doorway of the office managed to escape without injuries.

Jones then shot at a man sitting on a wagon. Although the man was not harmed, the bullet struck one of his horses in the hip. Afterwards, Jones walked across the street into the Tyler Blacksmith shop and barricaded himself inside. Police officers quickly surrounded the shop, as did volunteers with rifles. A few minutes later, Jones fatally shot himself in the head with one of his revolvers.

== Victims ==
- Herbert E. Ellis, 65
- William W. Blazo, 73
- Raymond Blazo, 37
- Reginald B. Stanhope, 57

== Perpetrator ==
Adrian F. Jones (c. 1867 – September 8, 1933), although mentally unstable, was considered harmless because he had never threatened anyone. He was fond of firearms—often carrying his guns on the street—and was a skilled hunter. The night before the shooting, his landlady said that he had been restless and rambled incoherently to himself, which she said was not abnormal behavior for him. However, he was more irritable than usual the following morning.

Jones held grudges against two of the victims, Ellis and William Blazo. His grudge against Ellis went back up to 20 years beforehand, when the two were neighbors. Jones also indicated that he wanted to eradicate Blazo's company for undisclosed reasons.

Jones was originally a farmhand in Belfast, but moved to Rhode Island to work at an insane asylum in Cranston. He later worked at another insane asylum in Northampton, Massachusetts, before returning to Belfast. He had never been married and had no living immediate relatives.

== See also ==
- List of mass shootings in the United States
- Gun laws in Maine
