= List of disasters in Massachusetts by death toll =

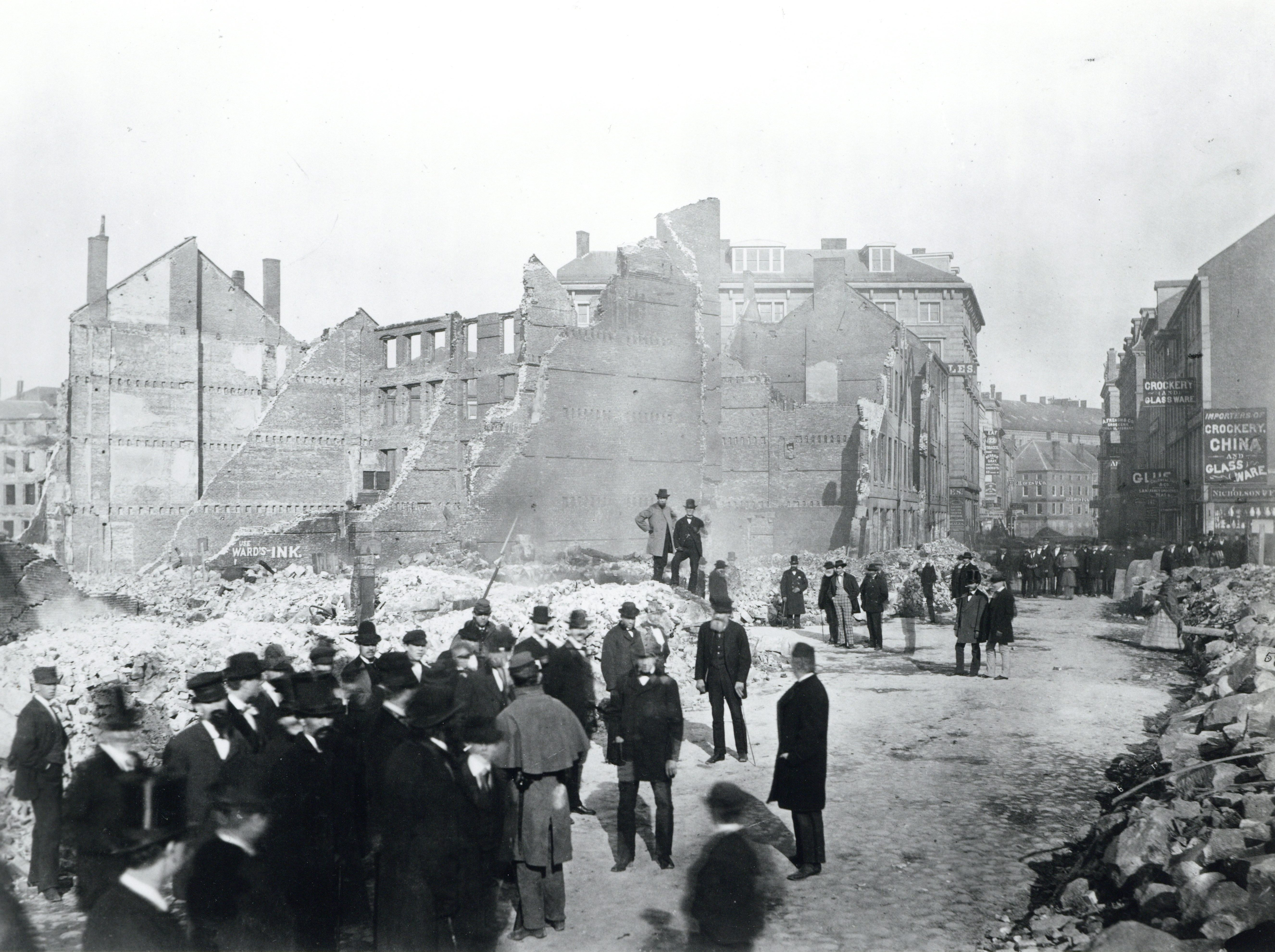
Ruins of the Great Boston Fire of 1872

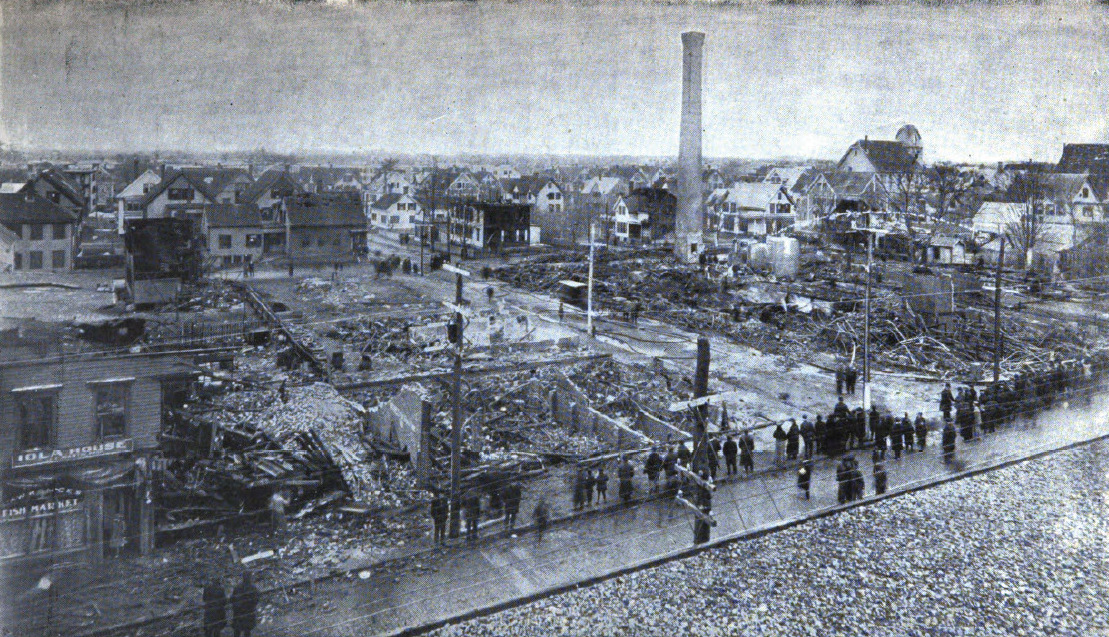
Aftermath of the Grover Shoe Factory disaster (1905)

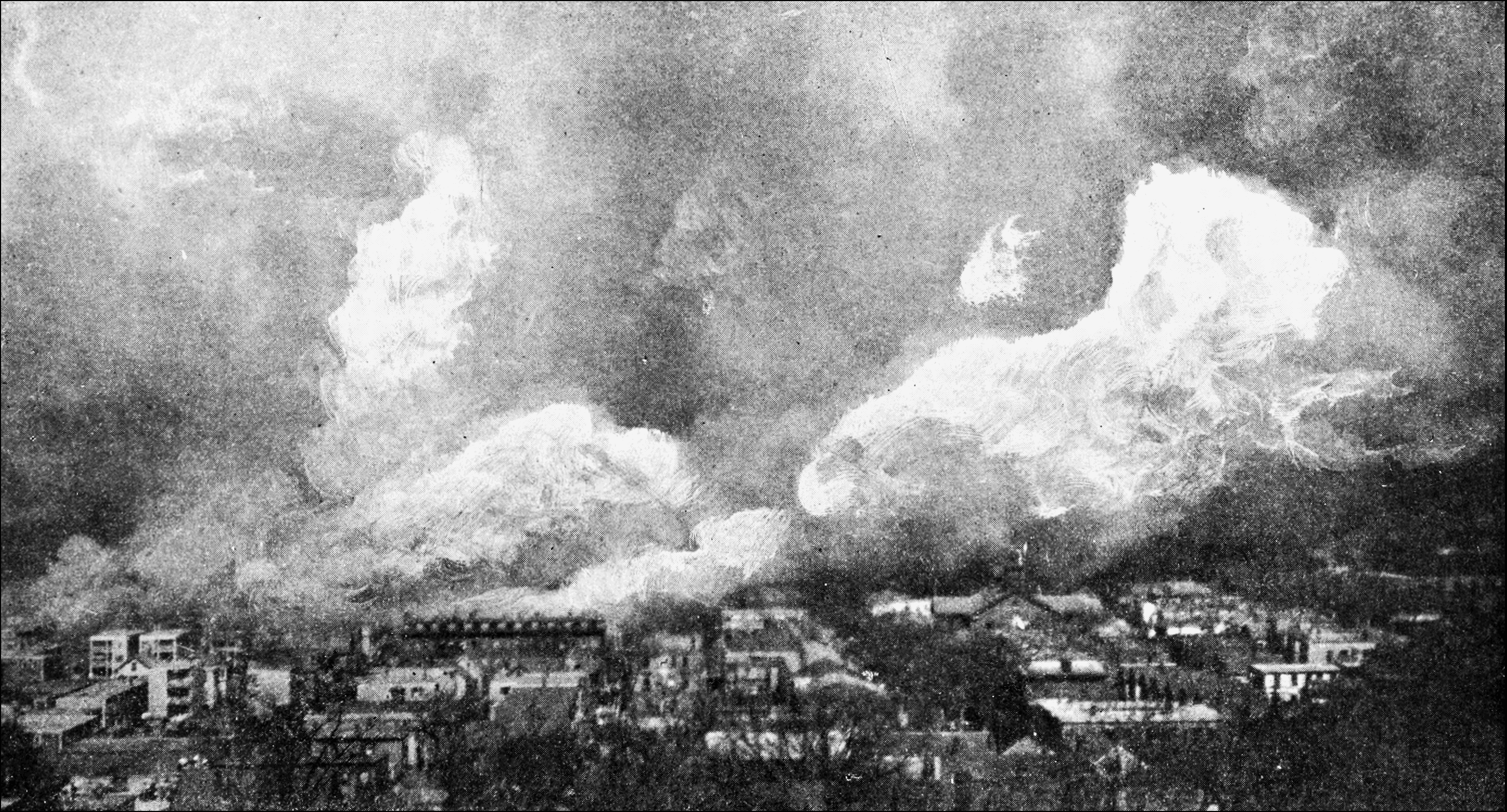
Great Chelsea fire of 1908

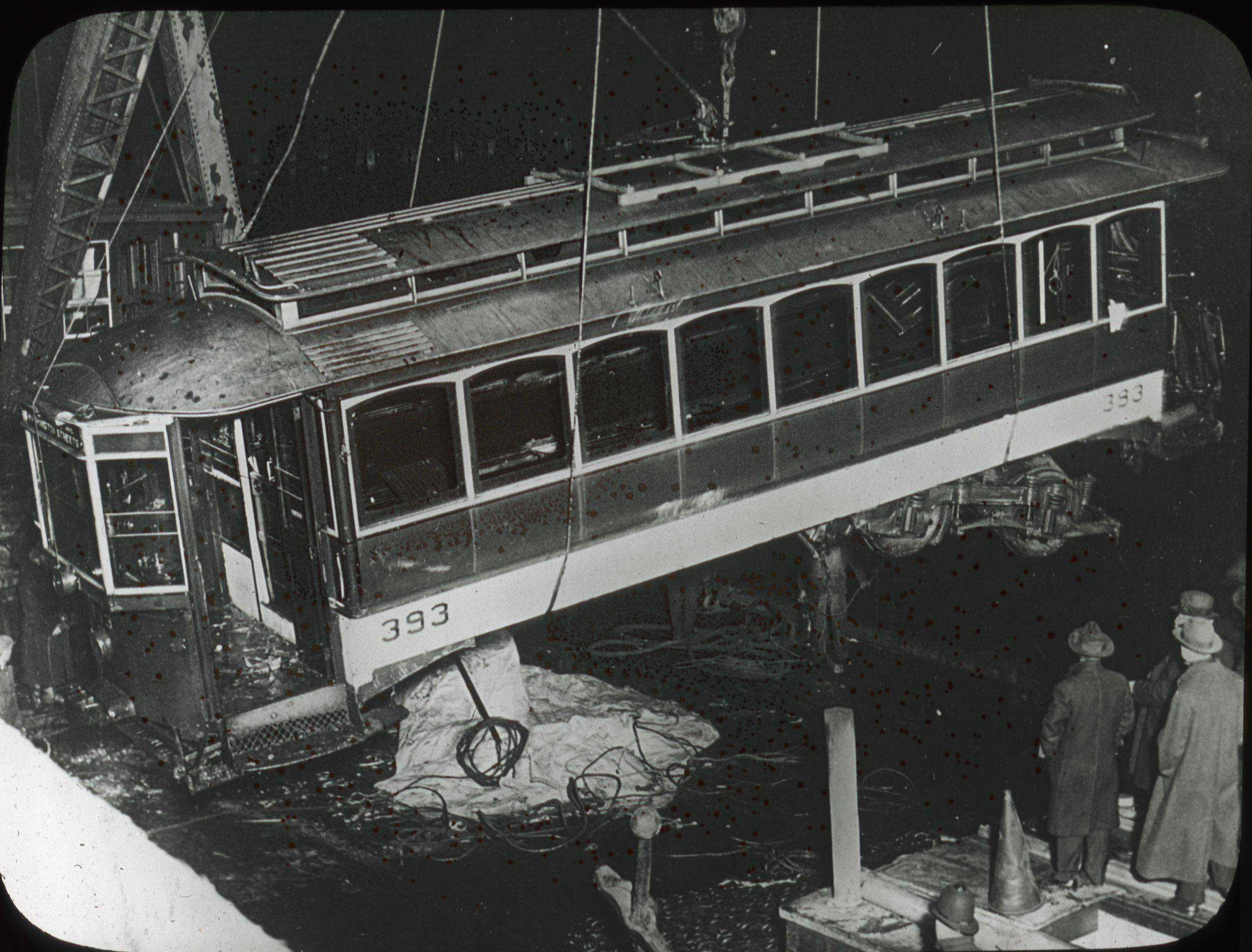
Streetcar involved in the Summer Street Bridge disaster (1916) being raised from the river

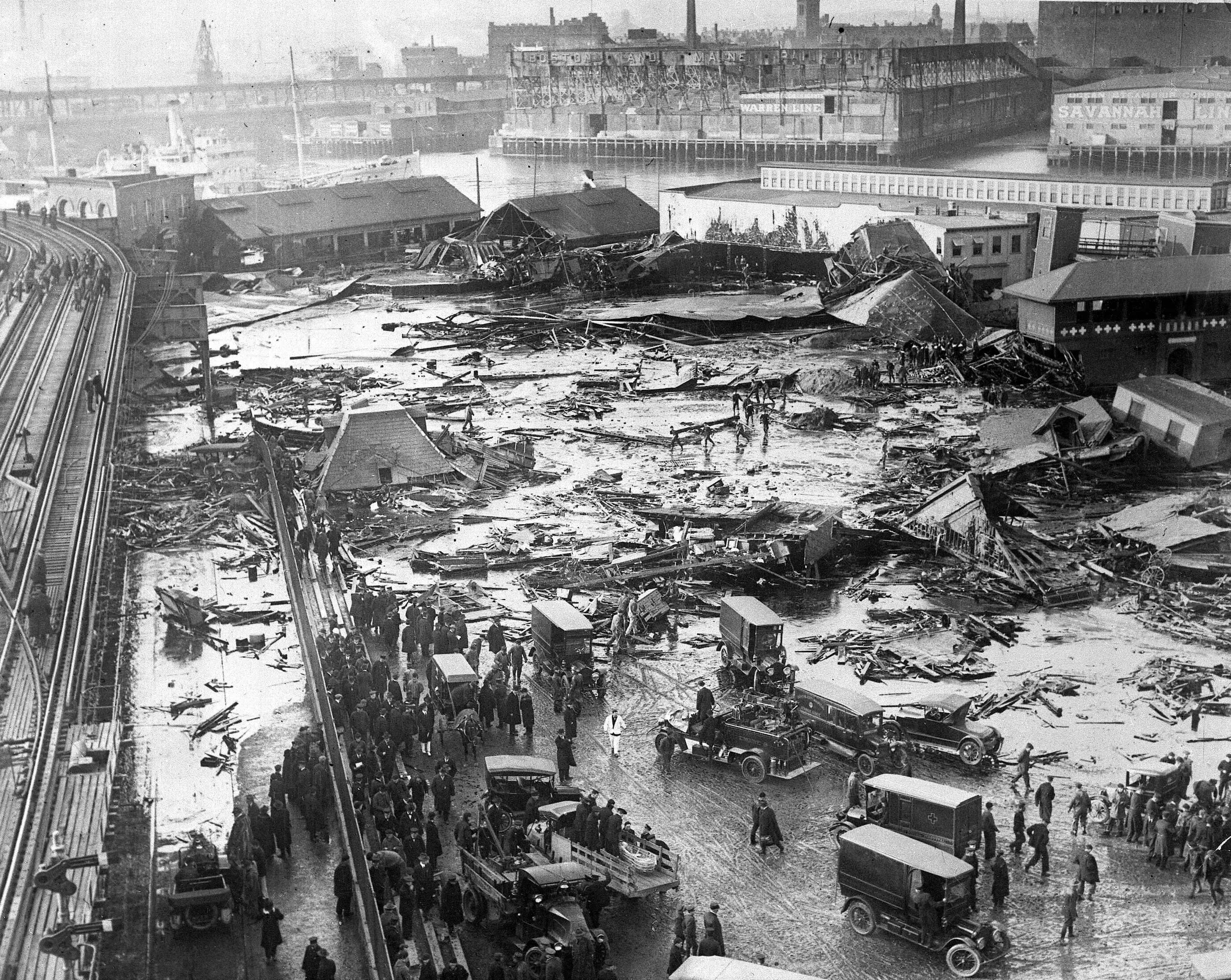
Wreckage of the Great Molasses Flood (1919)

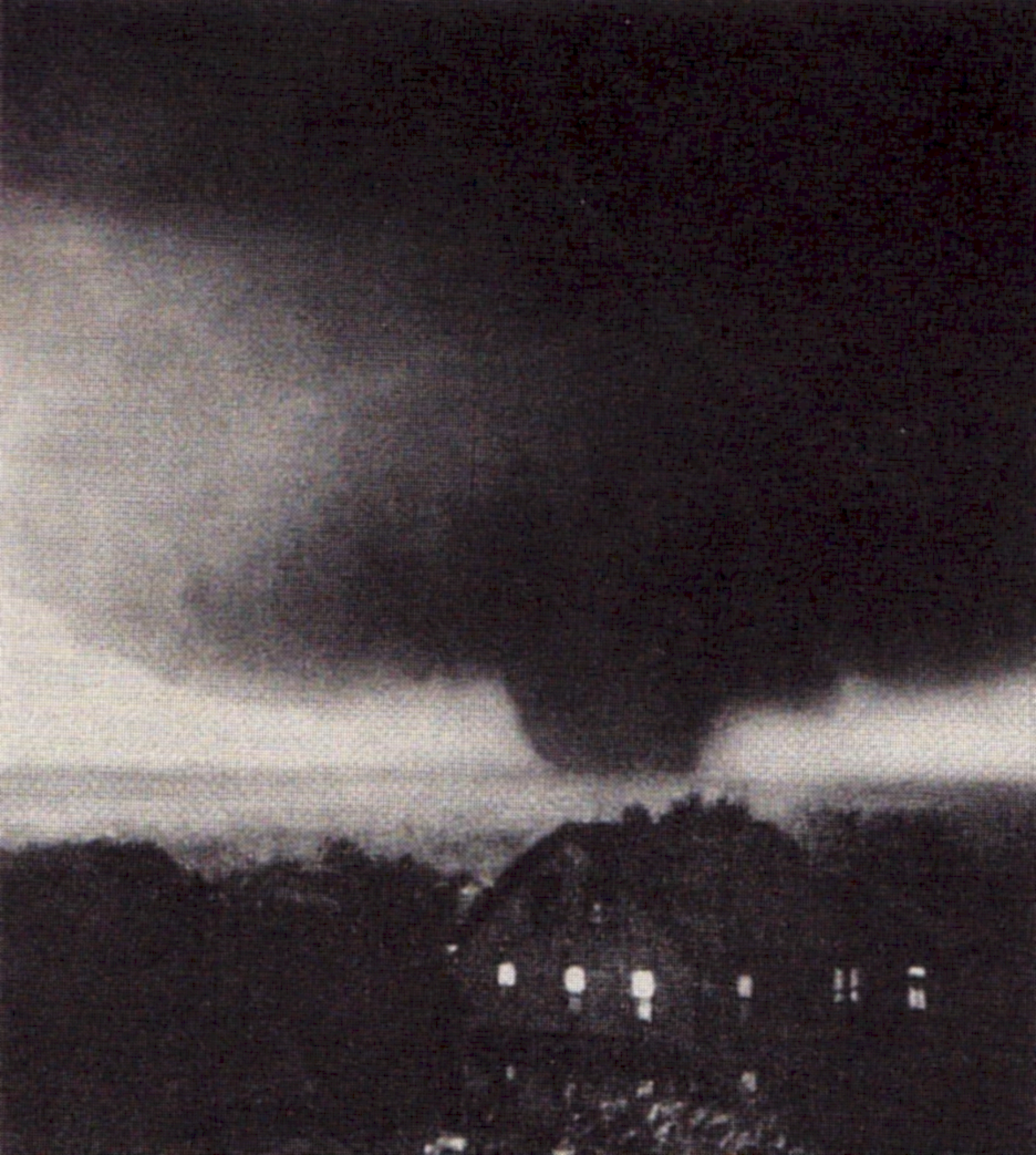
A photograph of the large Worcester tornado on June 9, 1953.

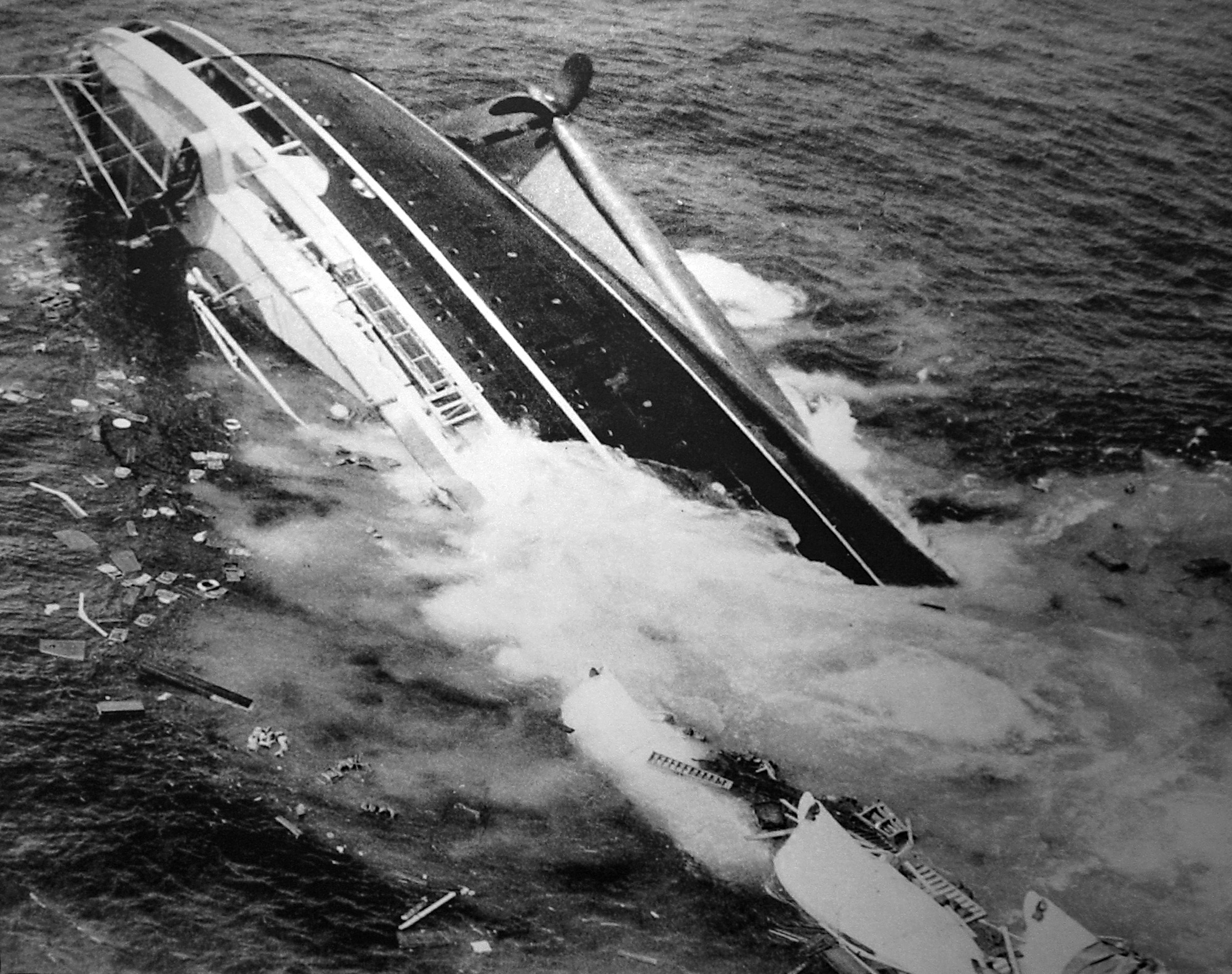
Andrea Doria sinking (1956)

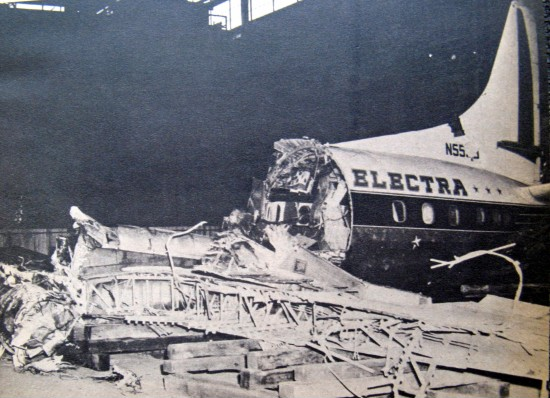
Wreckage of Eastern Air Lines Flight 375 (1960)

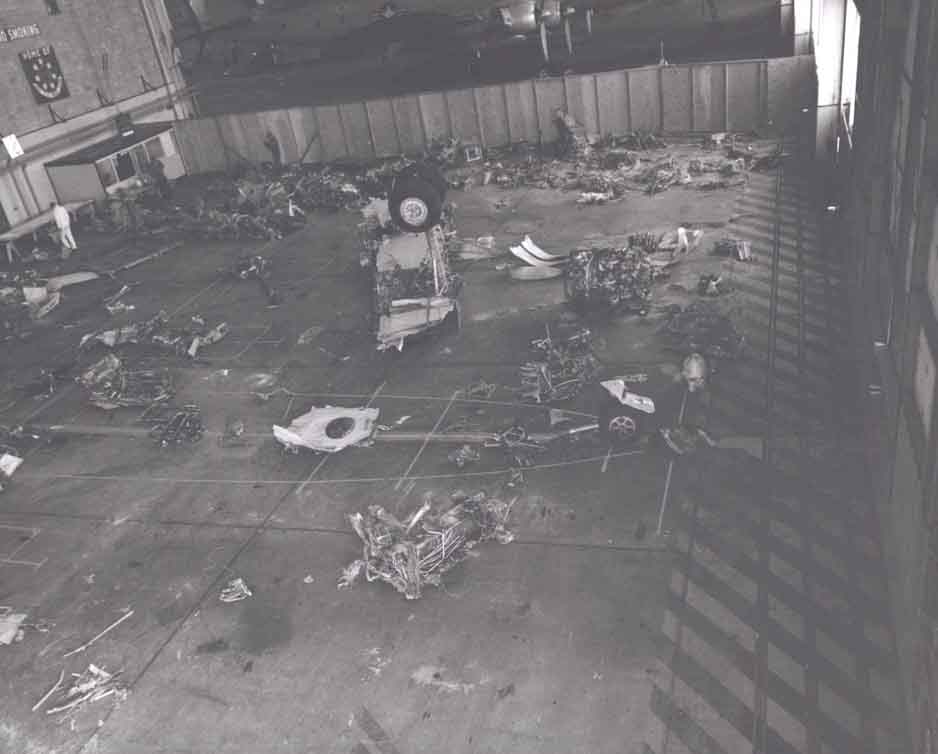
Wreckage of the 1967 Nantucket radar plane crash, in a hangar after recovery

This is a list of known disasters that have occurred in Massachusetts, organized by death toll. Historically documented events that caused 10 or more deaths are included.

== List ==
Notes:

- Some of the events occurred prior to Massachusetts becoming a U.S. state.
- Acts of war are excluded, such as battles of the American Revolutionary War in Massachusetts.
- Annual deaths from influenza ("flu season") are excluded unless they reached pandemic level per the Massachusetts Department of Public Health. Every flu season since at least 2018–2019 has resulted in at least 10 deaths in Massachusetts.
- Some of the events occurred in the Atlantic Ocean, at varying distances from land (such distances, when known, are provided via footnote).

Year (Note: For continuous multi-year events, the year in the year column represents the initial year of the event, unless otherwise noted.)	Event	Type	Death toll	Location	Sources
1918	Spanish flu pandemic	Disease	28,870	statewide	
2020	COVID-19 pandemic	Disease	20,872	statewide	
1693	1693 Boston yellow fever epidemic	Disease	3,100+	Boston	
1911	1911 Eastern North America heat wave	Weather	1,100 (Note: Contemporaneously, The Springfield Weekly Republican reported 319 deaths for all of New England, with 104 deaths occurring in Boston.)	statewide	
1633	Massachusetts smallpox epidemic	Disease	1,000	statewide	
1721	1721 Boston smallpox outbreak	Disease	844	Boston	
1677	1677–1678 Boston smallpox epidemic	Disease	750–1,000	Boston	
1942	Cocoanut Grove fire	Fire	492	Boston	
1999	EgyptAir Flight 990	Aviation accident	217	off Nantucket (Note: The aircraft crashed in Georges Bank, 62 miles (100 km) off the coast of Nantucket island.)	
1898	Sinking of the Portland	Shipwreck	193 to 245	off Gloucester (Note: The wreck is located within Stellwagen Bank National Marine Sanctuary.)	
1874	Mill River Flood of 1874	Flood	139	Williamsburg/Northampton	
1963	Sinking of the USS Thresher	Shipwreck	129	off Cape Cod (Note: Approximately 220 miles (350 km) east of Cape Cod)	
1884	Sinking of the SS City of Columbus	Shipwreck	103	off Martha's Vineyard (Note: Approximately one mile (1.6 km) northwest of Gay Head Light)	
1953	Worcester tornado	Weather	94	Worcester	
1973	Delta Air Lines Flight 723	Aviation accident	89	Boston	
1860	Pemberton Mill collapse	Collapse (building)	88 to 145	Lawrence	
1938	1938 New England hurricane	Weather	88	statewide	
1875	Precious Blood Church fire	Fire	78	Holyoke	
1960	Eastern Air Lines Flight 375	Aviation accident	62	Boston Harbor	
1896	1896 Eastern North America heat wave	Weather	60+	statewide (Note: The Boston Globe reported that at least 60 deaths from the heat occurred in Boston.)	
1905	Grover Shoe Factory disaster	Explosion	58	Brockton	
1956	Sinking of the SS Andrea Doria	Ship collision	51 (Note: 46 passengers from the Andrea Doria and five members of the crew of Stockholm)	off Nantucket (Note: Approximately 50 miles (80 km) south of Nantucket)	
1916	Summer Street Bridge disaster	Railway accident	46	Boston	
1925	Pickwick Club collapse	Collapse (building)	44	Boston	
1927	Sinking of the USS S-4	Ship collision	40	off Provincetown (Note: Approximately 1,800 yards (1.0 mi; 1.6 km) off Wood End Coast Guard Station, which was located near Wood End Light.)	
1911	Septic sore throat outbreak	Disease	38	Boston	
1953	Explosion aboard USS Leyte	Shipboard explosion	37	Boston (Naval Annex)	
1871	Great Revere train wreck of 1871	Railway collision	30	Revere	
1913	Arcadia Hotel fire	Fire	28	Boston	
1872	Great Boston Fire of 1872	Fire	26 to 30	Boston	
1946	Mount Tom B-17 crash	Aviation accident	25	Holyoke	
1874	Granite Mill fire	Fire	23	Fall River	
1887	Forest Hills disaster	Collapse (rail bridge)	23	Boston	
1890	1890 Quincy train wreck	Railway accident	23	Quincy	
1958	Northeast Airlines Flight 258	Aviation accident	23	Nantucket	
1903	United States Cartridge Company explosion	Explosion	22	Lowell	
1915	St. John's School fire	Fire	21	Peabody	
1919	Great Molasses Flood	Flood	21	Boston	
1929	Sinking of the ST Seiner (Note: See: List of shipwrecks in 1929#Unknown date)	Shipwreck	21	off Nantucket (Note: The wreck is located on the eastern edge of Georges Bank, approximately 125 miles (201 km) east of Nantucket.)	
1928	Preble Box Toe Company explosion	Explosion	20	Lynn	
1878	Wollaston disaster	Railway accident	19	Quincy	
1908	Great Chelsea fire of 1908	Fire	19	Chelsea	
1945	SS Silver Star Park and SS Mangore collision	Ship collision	19	off New Bedford (Note: Described as "in the vicinity of Hen and Chickens Lightship at Buzzards Bay, Mass." although another source places the collision at "about 45 nm ENE of the Long Island Sound access to New York City and about 10 nm from Newport, RI".)	
1966	1966 Nantucket radar plane crash	Aviation accident	19	off Nantucket (Note: Approximately 125 miles (201 km) east of Nantucket)	
1905	Baker Bridge train wreck	Railway collision	17	Lincoln	
1910	Morewood Lake Ice Company explosion	Explosion	17	Pittsfield	
1944	Sinking of the USS YF-415	Shipboard explosion	17	off Hingham (Note: Approximately 14 miles (23 km) northeast of Boston Harbor)	
1804	1804 New England hurricane	Weather	16	statewide	
1965	1965 Nantucket radar plane crash	Aviation accident	16	off Nantucket (Note: Approximately 85 miles (137 km) northeast of Nantucket)	
1942	Garnet Peak C-53 crash	Aviation accident	16	Peru	
1958	Westover Air Force Base KC-135 crash	Aviation accident	15	Chicopee	
1967	1967 Nantucket radar plane crash	Aviation accident	15	off Nantucket (Note: Approximately one-quarter mile (0.40 km) off Madaket Beach)	
1984	Beverly rooming house fire	Fire	15	Beverly	
1893	Chester train wreck	Collapse (rail bridge)	14	Chester	
1928	Beacon Oil explosion	Explosion	14	Everett	
1867	Hoosac Tunnel Central Shaft accident	Collapse (rail tunnel)	13	Florida	
1906	Amsden Building collapse	Collapse (building)	13	Framingham	
1941	Strand Theatre fire	Fire	13	Brockton	
1942	Melvin Hall fire	Fire	13	Lynn	
1956	Swampscott train wreck	Railway collision	13	Swampscott	
1966	Everett train-truck crash	Railway accident	13	Everett	
1890	North End tenement fire (North Street)	Fire	12	Boston	
1952	Camp Edwards C-47/F-94B collision	Aviation accident	12	Mashpee	
1958	Northeast Airlines Flight 285	Aviation accident	12	New Bedford	
1886	Deerfield railway accident	Railway accident	11	Deerfield	
1902	Frank A. Palmer and Louise B. Crary collision	Ship collision	11	off Gloucester (Note: The wrecks are located in Stellwagen Bank National Marine Sanctuary.)	
1913	Lawrence bathhouse tragedy	Drowning	11	Lawrence	
1919	Springfield Boys' Club Camp drownings (Note: See also Big Pond (Massachusetts))	Drowning	11	East Otis	
1964	January 1964 blizzard (Note: See also List of Northeast snowfall impact scale winter storms)	Weather	11 (Note: The blizzard accounted for at least 31 deaths in New England.)	statewide	
1966	Paramount Hotel explosion	Explosion	11	Boston	
1902	North End lodging house fire (Fleet Street)	Fire	10	Boston	
1944	Mount Holyoke B-24 crash	Aviation accident	10	South Hadley	
1973	Worcester rooming house fire	Fire	10	Worcester	
2025	Gabriel House fire	Fire	10	Fall River	

== See also ==
- List of accidents and disasters by death toll
- List of natural disasters by death toll
- List of disasters in Maine by death toll
- List of disasters in New Hampshire by death toll
- List of disasters in the United States by death toll
