= 1911 Eastern North America heat wave =

1911 severe heat wave in the northeastern United States

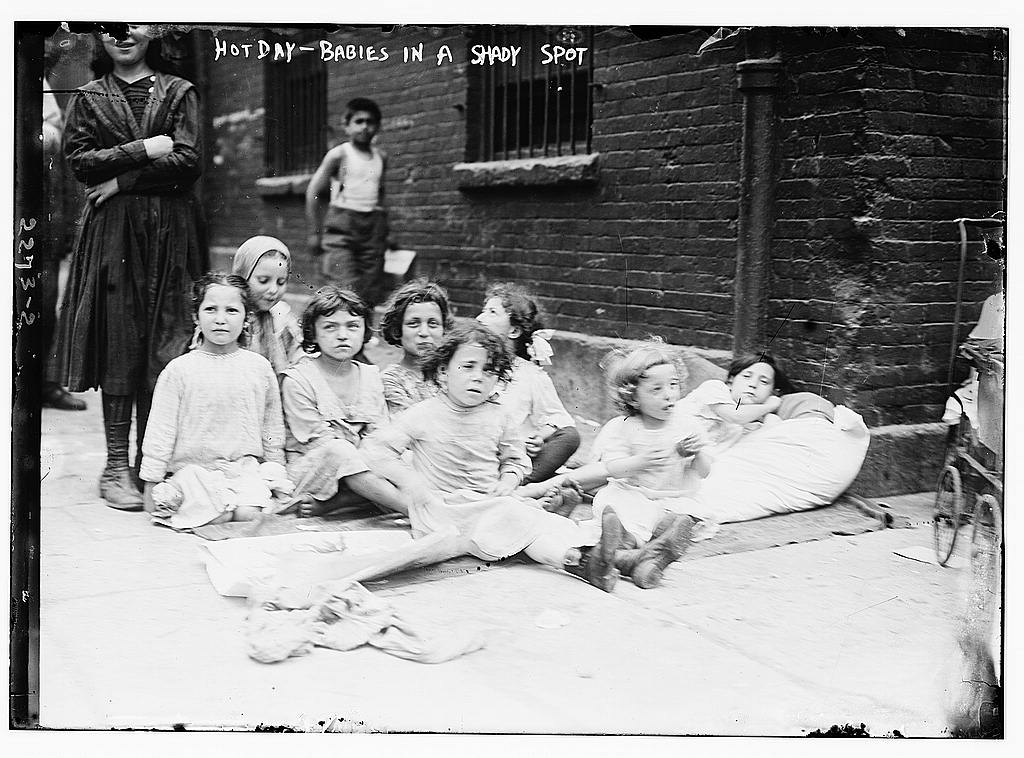
- Children seeking shade during the July 4, 1911, heat wave in New York City

Meteorological history
- Duration: July 4, 1911 - July 15, 1911
- Heat wave

Overall effects
- Fatalities: 380 confirmed; possibly as high as 2,000
- Areas affected: Northeastern United States

The 1911 Eastern North America heat wave was an 11-day severe heat wave that killed at least 380 people, though estimates have put the death toll as high as 2,000 people. The heat wave began on July 4 and did not cease until July 15. In Nashua, New Hampshire, the temperature peaked at 106 °F (41 °C). In New York City, 158 people and 600 horses died.

== Description ==
Throughout June 1911, the temperature had been consistent with what normally was felt during New England summers, but starting in July, dry air which originated from the southern great plains began to flow into Canada before being swept south toward the east coast. The hot wind suppressed cooler ocean breezes, and this caused the temperature to rise so suddenly and dramatically that in Providence, Rhode Island, there was a rise of 11 °F (6.1 °C) in a half hour.

The area between Pennsylvania and Maine was reportedly most affected by the heat. During the 11 days, temperature records were set all over New England. In Boston, the temperature rose to 104° (40 °C) on July 4, an all-time record high that still stands. A statewide all time heat record for Maine was set in Bridgton, at 105 °F (41 °C).

In Canada, Toronto saw temperatures as high as 39.4 °C (102.9 °F), the highest temperature recorded until 1936 at 40.6 °C (105.1 °F). In Quebec, Montreal reached up to 35 °C (95 °F) and held that record until 1917 (35.6 °C (96.1 °F)).

The heatwave was finally ended by a severe thunderstorm, which traveled across the Northeast and killed an additional five people.

== Heatwave impacts ==
=== Health impacts ===
==== Canada ====
In Montreal, many people took advantage on the 4th of July of regulations getting loosened on to allow people to sleep in parks, while many others were also reported by The Quebec Chronicle to sleep on balconies, rooftops, and doorsteps.

Deaths and "prostrations" (incidents of heat exhaustion) were reported in both Ontario (Toronto and Hamilton) and Québec (Montreal) provinces. In Toronto, about half of the deaths are infants.

==== United States ====
The first day of the heatwave caused crowds in major cities to form around thermometers so they could watch the temperature rise. Pedestrians in these crowds reportedly began to collapse from heat stroke as the day went by. By nighttime, mothers walked the street with crying infants hoping to keep them awake in fear that if they slept in their cribs they would not awaken.

As the heat wave's second day began, 17 people had died from drowning alone after trying to swim in order to escape the heat. Due to the temperature indoors many began sleeping outside either on roofs of apartments or on sidewalks with at least 5,000 people sleeping on the Boston Common alone.

Besides deaths caused directly by the heat, it was reported that in every major city affected by the heatwave that the temperatures had been driving people insane and causing suicides. One such example, reported by The New London Day, was of an elderly Boston man named Jacob Seegar who reportedly was driven so insane by the heat that he killed himself with a revolver in order to escape it.

The death toll continued to rise until finally a sudden thunderstorm brought a wave of relief, soon after which temperatures returned to their normal levels for good.

The 1911 heat wave is considered the most deadly weather-related disaster in the history of New England. Contemporaneously, The Springfield Weekly Republican reported 319 deaths and 1138 "prostrations" (incidents of heat exhaustion) in New England, with 104 deaths and 511 prostrations occurring in Boston. In 2010, Yankee magazine noted a death toll of 1,100 for Massachusetts alone.

In Philadelphia, 158 people were reported to have died from the heatwave. Across the Northeast, 200 people were reported to have drowned while swimming in an attempt to escape the heat. Several deaths were additionally caused by the thunderstorms that broke the heat wave.

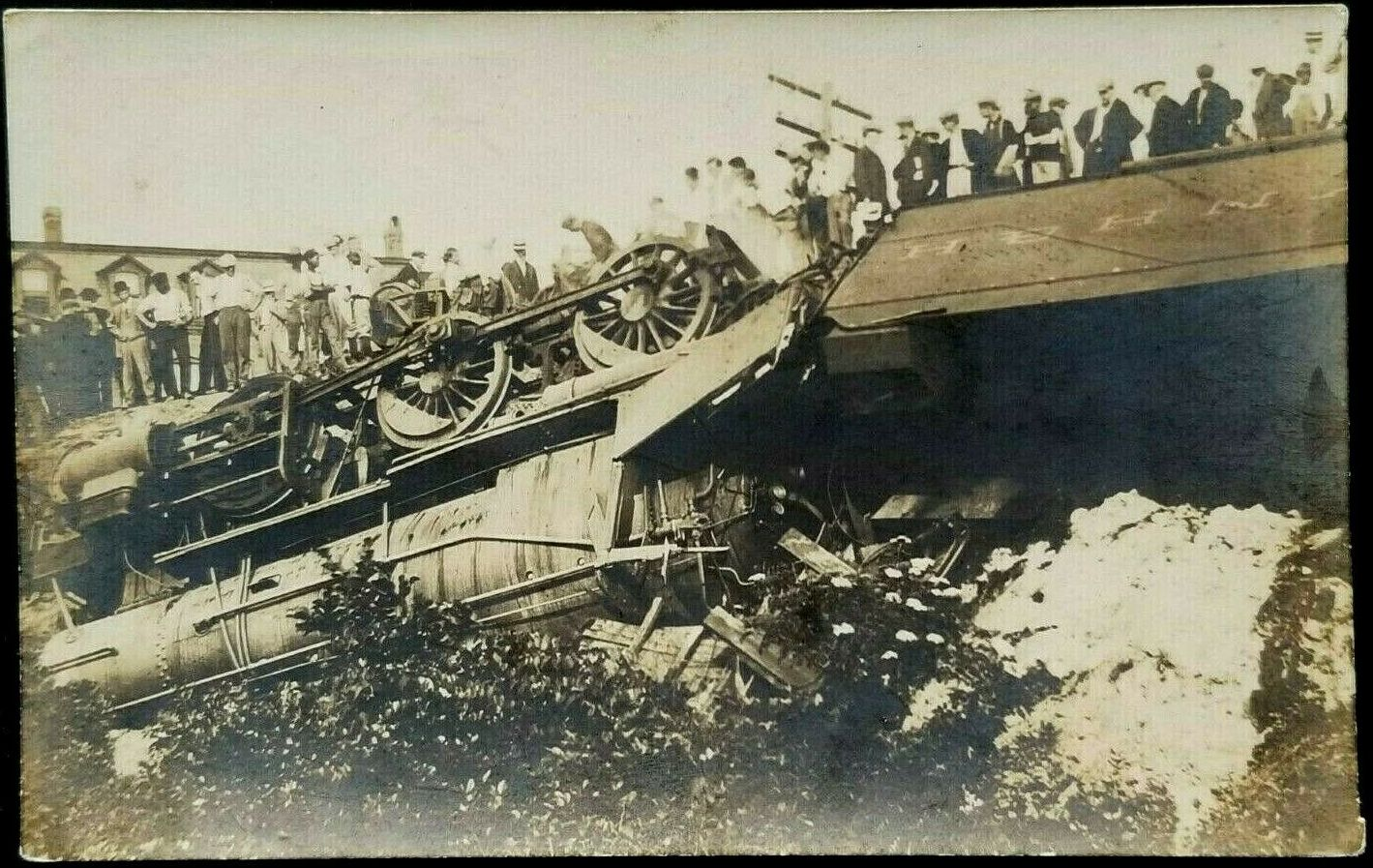
Divided back postcard of a July 1911 wreck at Westerly station. A freight locomotive derailed down an incline, killing the engineer and injuring two firemen.

=== Economic impacts ===
Due to the excessive heat, railroad rails expanded and bent.

By the time the sun had risen on July 5, industry had come to a standstill. Throughout the region, factories were closed and mail service was suspended.

== See also ==
- Ice famine
- 1896 Eastern North America heat wave
- List of disasters in Massachusetts by death toll
