= 1890 Quincy train wreck =

1890 railroad accident in Massachusetts

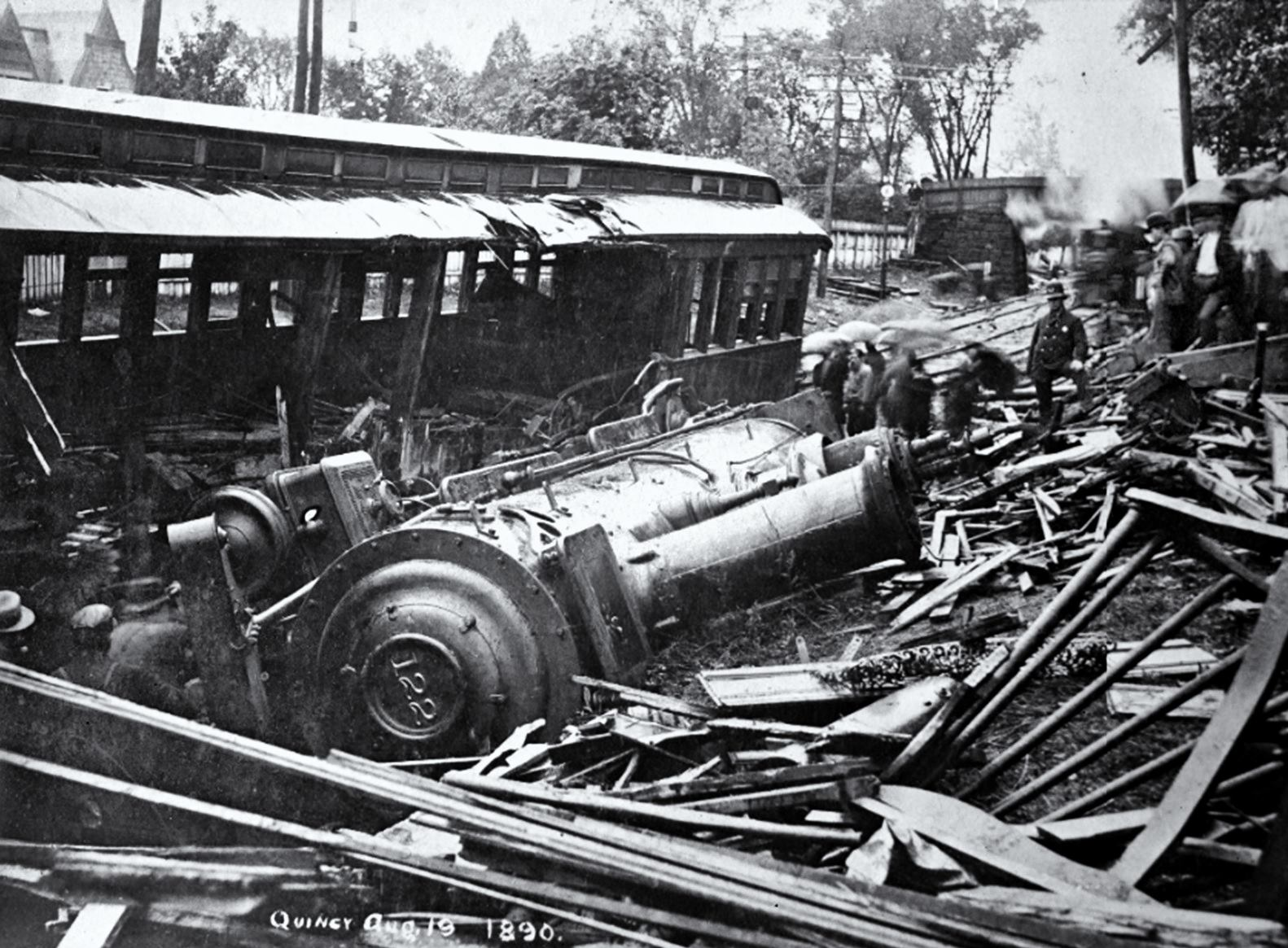
- Aftermath of the wreck

Details
- Date: August 19, 1890 (135 years ago); Shortly after 1:00 pm
- Location: Quincy, Massachusetts
- Coordinates: 42.2533°N 71.0065°W
- Country: U.S.
- Operator: Old Colony Railroad
- Incident type: Derailment
- Cause: Jack left on the track

Statistics
- Trains: 1
- Deaths: 23
- Injured: 29

The 1890 Quincy train wreck was a railway accident that occurred on August 19, 1890, in Quincy, Massachusetts, resulting in the deaths of 23 people. It was the second major train wreck in the city, following the 1878 accident in Wollaston. The accident was caused by a jack that had been left on the track. The foreman of the crew that placed the jack on the track was charged with manslaughter, but the trial ended in a hung jury.

== Accident ==
At 10:50 a.m. on August 19, 1890, the Old Colony Railroad's Woods Hole Express, consisting of a locomotive, baggage car, smoking car, Pullman car, and four coaches, departed Woods Hole with 391 passengers. Its riders were tourists from across the country who had vacationed in Martha's Vineyard and Nantucket. It was scheduled to arrive in Boston at 1:10 PM.

Near the Adams Academy campus in Quincy, Old Colony maintenance workers had returned from break and were working on surfacing the road bed. They were working at the north end of a curve, which made it so that an oncoming train could not be seen for 300 to 400 feet (91 to 122 m). In spite of this, foreman Joseph F. Welch chose not to send a flag out to warn oncoming trains.

Shortly after passing Quincy station, the express passed a gravel train. The engineer of the gravel train motioned indicating that the engineer of the express should whistle for people on the track. When the express was about 350 feet (110 m) away from the work crew, the engineer used his whistle to warn of his train's approach. The men, who had not previously heard the express due to the passing gravel train, moved out of the way, but neglected to take a jack off of the rail. The Woods Hole Express struck the jack, which derailed the locomotive and plunged it into an embankment. The fireman was instantly killed, but the engineer survived. The tender, baggage car, smoker, and Pullman passed by the engine and were stretched out alongside the track. No one on these cars was seriously injured. The lead coach fell on top of the engine and its 50 passengers were thrown into the corner, killing many of them. The car then filled with steam from the engine fatally scalding several passengers who had not died in the collision. The three remaining coaches stayed on the track and their occupants were unharmed. In addition to the 12 people killed in the wreck, 11 later died from their injuries. Boston newspaper editor Edwin C. Bailey was among those who perished.

== Prosecution ==
The Massachusetts Railroad Commission's report stated that "the immediate responsibility for this terrible accident rests upon Joseph F. Welch, the section master." Following an inquest, the district attorney chose to prosecute Welch. On September 5, a grand jury indicted Welch for manslaughter. His trial began on April 28, 1891. On May 1, after nine hours of deliberation, the jury was unable to reach a verdict. The jury was split 8 to 4, with the majority favoring acquittal.

== See also ==
- List of disasters in Massachusetts by death toll
