= St. John's School fire =

Deadly 1915 fire in Peabody, Massachusetts, US

- Date: October 28, 1915
- Location: St. John's School in Peabody, Massachusetts
- Coordinates: 42.5258°N 70.9303°W
- Deaths: 21

The St. John's School fire was a deadly fire that occurred on the morning of October 28, 1915, at the St. John's School on Chestnut Street in the downtown area of Peabody, Massachusetts. Twenty-one girls between the ages of 6 and 17 were burned or crushed to death while attempting to escape the fire.

== Fire ==
Over 700 of the school's 782 students were in the building when the fire began in the basement of the school building. There were no fire escapes on the outside of the building. The school day began at 8:30 am and at 8:45 am, mother superior Sister Carmelita Marie entered the building and immediately smelled smoke. She sounded the fire alarm and began supervising the evacuation of the school.

This procedure should have led to the children and teachers leaving the building through the stairways out of both the front and rear exits. The students on the first floor exited the building through the front door without issue. However, as the smoke thickened students from the upper floors panicked. Ignoring the rear exit, they rushed for the front door and became jammed in the vestibule. By the time fire crews arrived the door was impassable. It would take until 10 am for it to be clear enough for firefighters to be able to pass through. Some students chose to make the 10-foot (3.0 m) jump out of the second-story window, a number of them pushing passed-out classmates out of the windows before jumping themselves. Neighbors aided the children by using coats and blankets as life nets to catch the falling students. Others forced the children out the doors, picking up children who had fallen or fainted and pushing them outside and many went back to upper floors in order to make sure that students were evacuating. Some students worked together to help others evacuate or ran back inside the school in attempts to find siblings or friends.

An off-duty fireman was the first to notify the fire department. By the time they arrived, the entire building was engulfed in flames. During the fire, the nearest hydrant, which was inspected the week prior, malfunctioned, hampering the department's efforts. Chief Jesse Bartlett called to Salem and Danvers for assistance.

== Victims ==
Not all were able to escape, however; the bodies of the 19 victims were found after the fire subsided, huddled together and burned beyond recognition, on the inside of the school entrance and two later died at the hospital. Of those killed, the eldest was seventeen-years-old and the youngest was six. Two of the nuns were injured, one suffering serious burns; however, none of the adults were killed. All of the deceased were burnt beyond recognition and were identified based on their personal effects.

== Aftermath ==
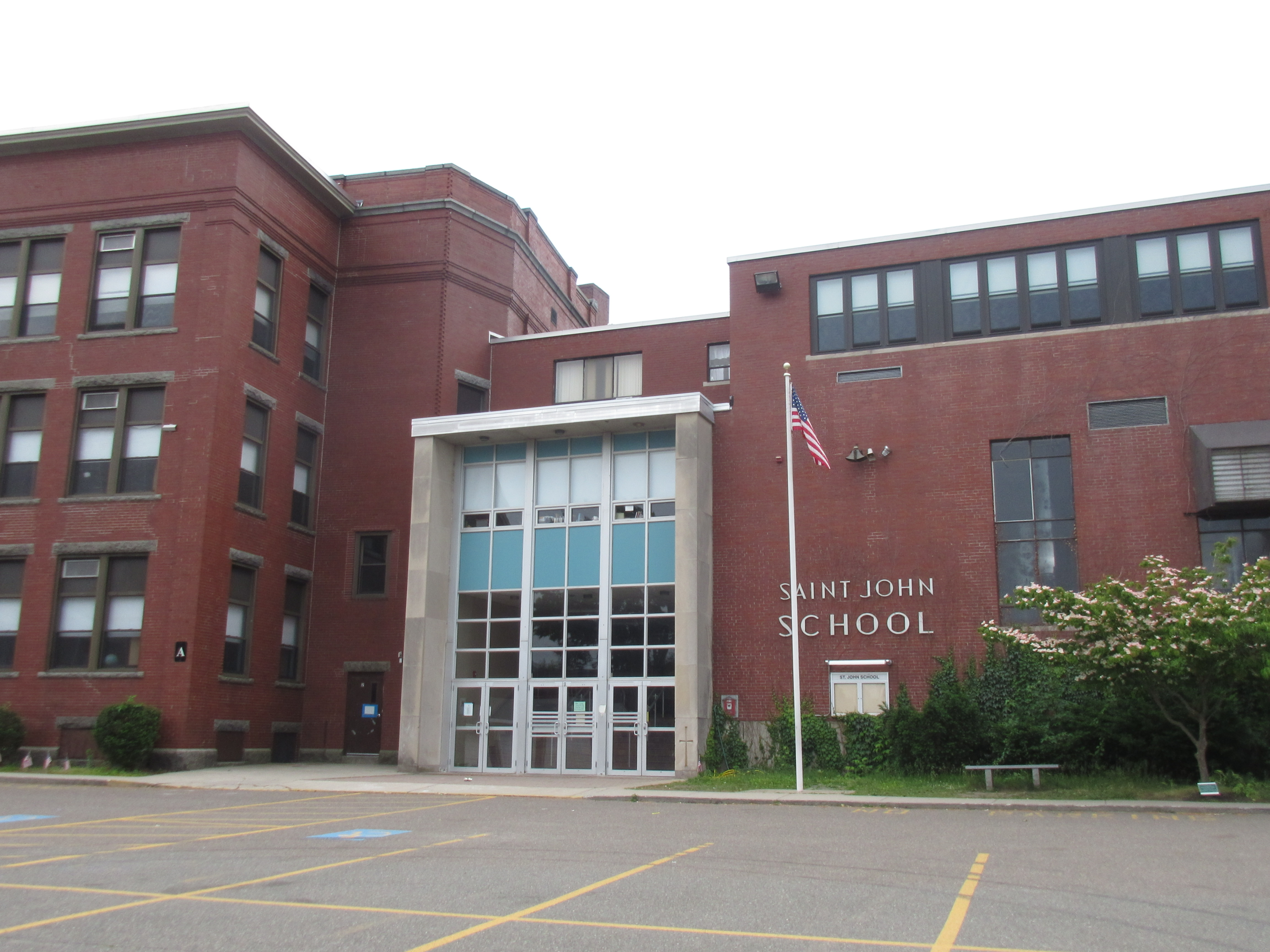
St. Johns School in Peabody Mass. (2018)

In the immediate aftermath of the fire, many did not want to remember the disaster. News photographers and a movie crew who had responded to the site along with personal photographers all had their cameras confiscated by law enforcement.

As a result of this fire, Peabody became the first city to pass a law that said all doors (in public buildings and school) must push out.

The school was later rebuilt at the same location and operates today as St. John the Baptist School, which educates children from preschool through eighth grade. A memorial statue to commemorate the fire, which depicts a statue of Jesus comforting two children, was erected in 2005. The last survivor of the fire died in 2008, at the age of 98.

== See also ==
- List of disasters in Massachusetts by death toll
