= 1966 Everett, Massachusetts, truck-train crash =

1966 railway accident in Massachusetts, United States

1966 Everett truck-train crash
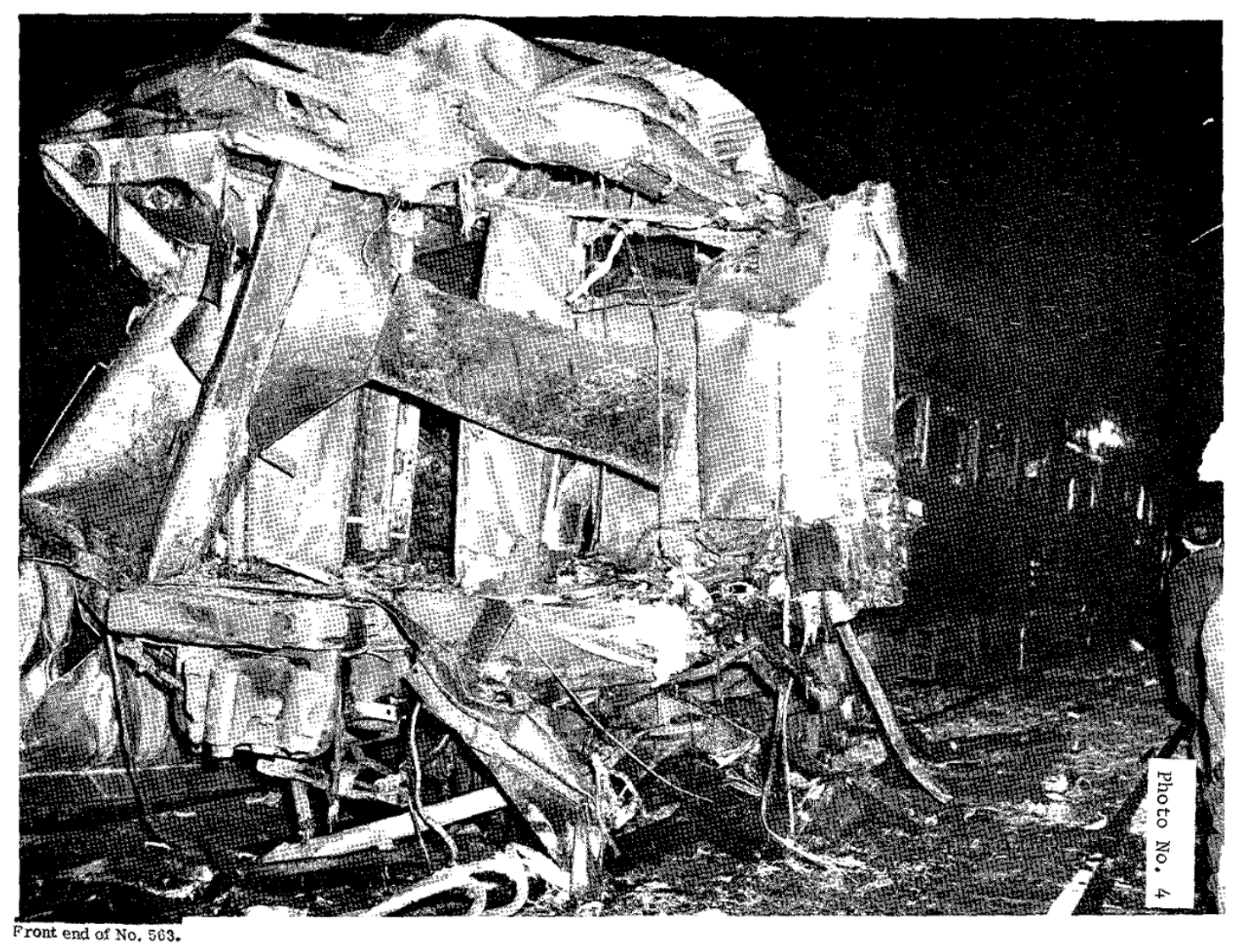
- Front of the involved train, from the report of the Interstate Commerce Commission

Details
- Date: December 28, 1966 (59 years ago); 12:10 am
- Location: Everett, Massachusetts
- Coordinates: 42°23′54″N 71°02′53″W
- Country: U.S.
- Operator: Boston and Maine Railroad
- Incident type: Moving train collision with stopped vehicle
- Cause: Vehicle stalled at crossing

Statistics
- Trains: 1
- Vehicles: 1
- Deaths: 13
- Injured: 21

The 1966 Everett truck-train crash was a railway accident that occurred on December 28, 1966, when a train struck a stalled tank truck, killing 13 people in Everett, Massachusetts.

== Crash ==
At 12:10 am, a Boston and Maine Railroad Buddliner traveling from Boston to Rockport struck a stalled tank truck carrying 7,000 US gallons (26,000 L) of oil at the railroad crossing on 2nd Street in Everett, Massachusetts. The Buddliner's cars quickly became engulfed in flames. Its doors jammed on impact and rescuers were forced to break windows to free passengers. 12 people died from burns or smoke inhalation and another 22 were injured. A 13th victim died over a month later.

== Investigations ==
The Interstate Commerce Commission (ICC) and the Massachusetts Department of Public Utilities (DPU) held joint hearings into the collision. ICC examiner Robert Boyce believed that the Buddliner's doors were responsible for many of the deaths in the accident, stating "I believe more people would have escaped from the train had the door opened outward instead of inward". Following the hearings, the ICC's enforcement division recommended that:

- Emergency exits be required on all passenger trains
- Trains be required to reduce speed in congested areas, railroad passenger cars be made of stronger material and have doors that open outward instead of inward
- All railroad passenger cars be equipped with emergency kits at both ends of the car
- Large motor vehicles and vehicles carrying hazardous materials use designated railroad crossings
- All motor vehicles with parking and emergency brakes have a way for the driver to release these brakes if they are applied automatically
- Steps be taken to develop a system to warn trains when vehicles have become stalled on the roadway
- A means be provided to operate the block signal if a motor vehicles becomes disabled on the tracks
- The government implement a program to educate commercial drivers on what to do if they become stalled at a crossing.

The Massachusetts Department of Public Utilities blamed the crash on a mechanical defect in the truck's copper right-angle adapter, which became separated, causing the brakes to lose air pressure and triggering the automatic emergency brakes. This issue would not have been detected unless the entire brake system was taken apart. As a result of the investigation, the DPU lowered the speed limit at grade crossings in Everett and Chelsea from 60 miles per hour (97 km/h) for passenger trains and 40 miles per hour (64 km/h) for freight trains to 35 miles per hour (56 km/h) and ordered a reconstruction of the 2nd Street crossing.

The National Transportation Safety Board (NTSB) blamed a loss of air pressure in the truck's brakes for the accident, but found that the truck's brakes complied with regulations. The NTSB's report blamed the deaths on a lack of emergency exits, darkness caused by the failure of the car's lighting system, and the jamming of the inward opening car door.

In 1973, a damages settlement of $2,125,000 ($15.4 million in 2025) was reached, with damages being paid by the railroad, the Budd Company (manufacturer of the Buddliner), and the Oxbow Transportation Company (operator of the accident truck).

== See also ==
- List of disasters in Massachusetts by death toll
