= 1896 Eastern North America heat wave =

United States weather disaster

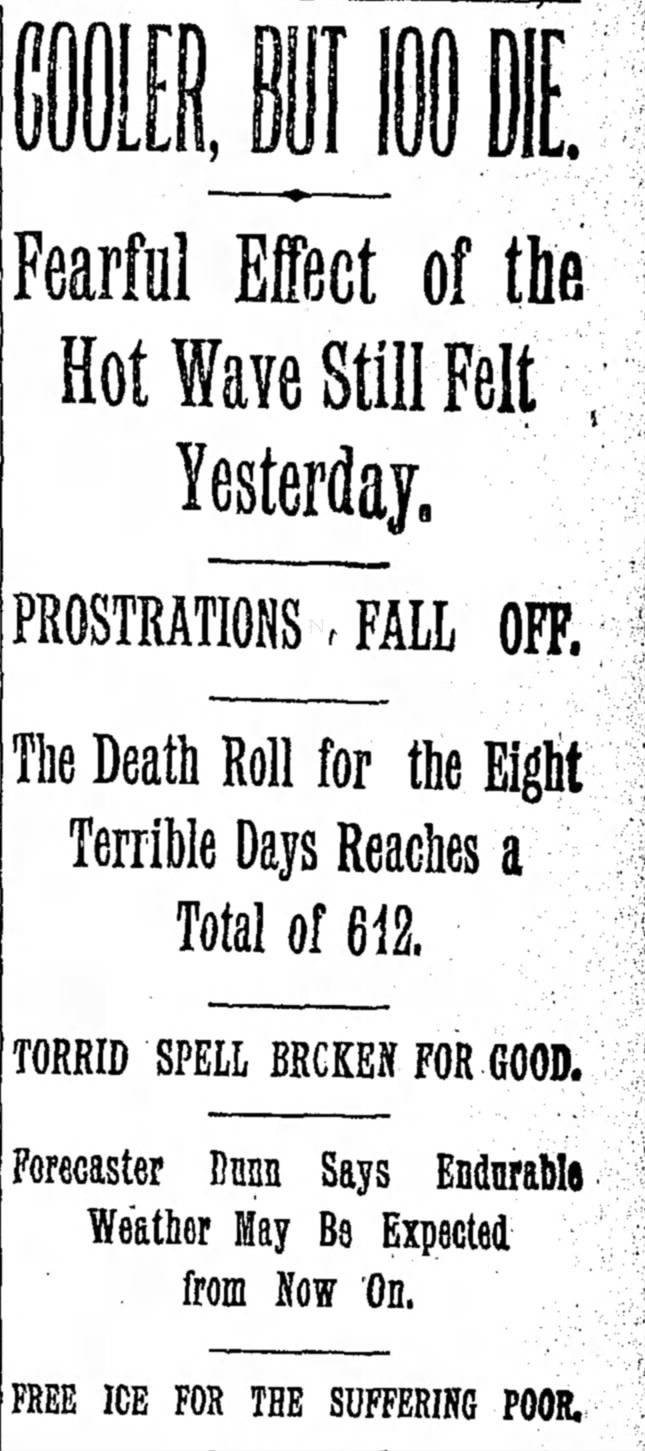
- Front-page headline in the New York World on August 15

Meteorological history
- Duration: August 4, 1896 - August 13, 1896
- Heat wave

Overall effects
- Fatalities: 1,500 (approximate)
- Areas affected: Eastern North America

The 1896 Eastern North America heat wave was a ten-day heat wave across much of Eastern North America including New York City, Boston, Newark and Chicago that killed about 1,500 people in August 1896.

== History ==
In New York City, August 4 through August 13 saw daily high temperatures of at least 90 °F (32 °C) with high humidity and little breeze. The temperature in the city did not drop below 72 °F (22 °C) at night, with three consecutive nights at 80 °F (27 °C) or above. It killed more than the New York City draft riots and the Great Chicago Fire combined. A majority of the deaths were of working-class men in their twenties who performed manual labor.

The New York City Public Works Commissioner ordered that his workers' shifts be modified so they would not be working during midday, and he had fire hydrants opened to cool people on the street. Theodore Roosevelt, then New York City Police Commissioner, distributed free ice from local police stations. After accidental deaths from people falling off the roofs they were sleeping on, the New York City Parks Department allowed people to sleep in parks overnight.

At Madison Square Garden on the evening of August 12, William Jennings Bryan formally accepted the Democratic Party nomination for president, which he had secured at the Democratic National Convention in Chicago a month prior. The high temperature and high humidity inside the Garden led to thousands of attendees walking out while he was speaking. The walk-outs, along with Bryan's decision to read a lengthy and complex speech, resulted in critical coverage by New York City newspapers. Bryan went on to lose the 1896 United States presidential election to William McKinley.

Elsewhere, The Boston Globe reported that at least 60 deaths from the heat occurred in Boston. On August 11, the number of heat-related deaths in St. Louis was reported as totalling 130, with the worst day having been August 8, when 22 people died. In Philadelphia, 173 deaths attributed to heat were reported for the week ending August 14.

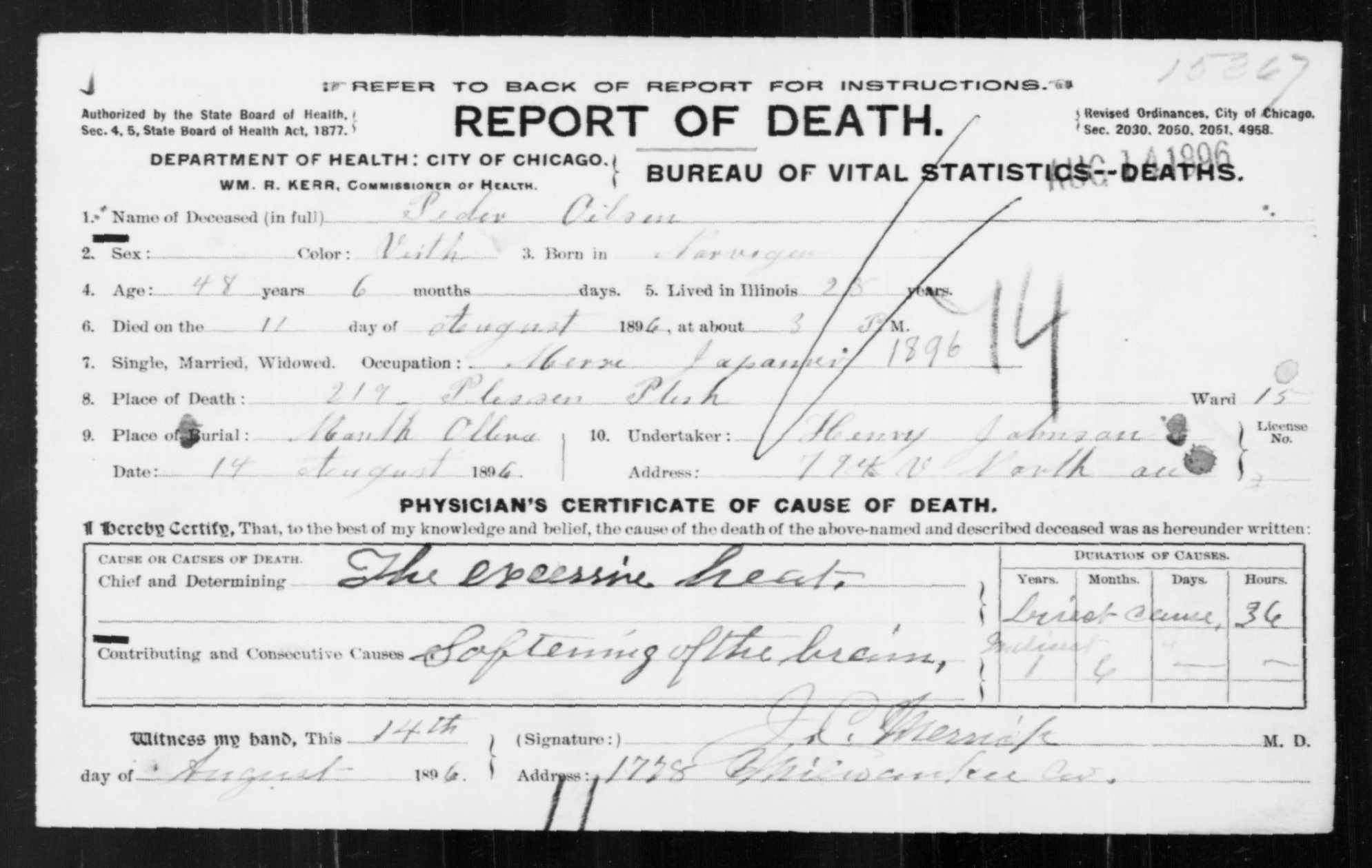
Death certificate of a Chicago resident who died due to "The excessive heat"

== See also ==
- 1911 Eastern North America heat wave
- List of disasters in Massachusetts by death toll
