= Strand Theatre fire =

1941 building fire in Brockton, Massachusetts

- Date: March 10, 1941
- Time: Around 12:45 AM
- Location: Strand Theatre 15 School Street Brockton, Massachusetts; 42°04′59″N 71°01′10″W
- Cause: Undetermined
- Deaths: 13
- Injuries: 20

The Strand Theatre fire occurred in Brockton, Massachusetts on March 10, 1941. Thirteen firefighters were killed when the roof collapsed, making it the deadliest firefighter disaster in Massachusetts.

== Fire ==
At around 11:45 p.m. on March 9, 1941, theater manager Frank Clements locked up the building. Around 12:45 a.m., members of the Shoe City Club noticed smoke coming from the building and notified its caretaker, Horace Spencer. Spencer sounded the first alarm at 12:45 a.m. and the second was sounded five minutes later. The fire started in the basement, but at around 1:20 a.m. it spread into the balcony, which led Chief Frank F. Dickinson to order a general alarm. According to investigators, the heat of the fire distorted steel trusses above the ceiling, which pushed the brick walls of the theater back and caused the roof to collapse. The collapse occurred around 1:50 a.m. while four crews were inside fighting the fire. 12 firefighters were killed in the collapse and a thirteenth died at Brockton Hospital two days later. The cause of the fire was never determined.

== Memorials ==
A small anthracite coal memorial built by a firefighter from Scranton, Pennsylvania, was placed in Brockton City Hall. In 2008, a 10-foot-tall (3.0 m) bronze statue of a firefighter kneeling in grief, with the names of the 13 men killed in the fire engraved on a base, was placed in City Hall Plaza.

== See also ==
- List of disasters in Massachusetts by death toll
