= Wollaston disaster =

1878 railroad accident in Massachusetts

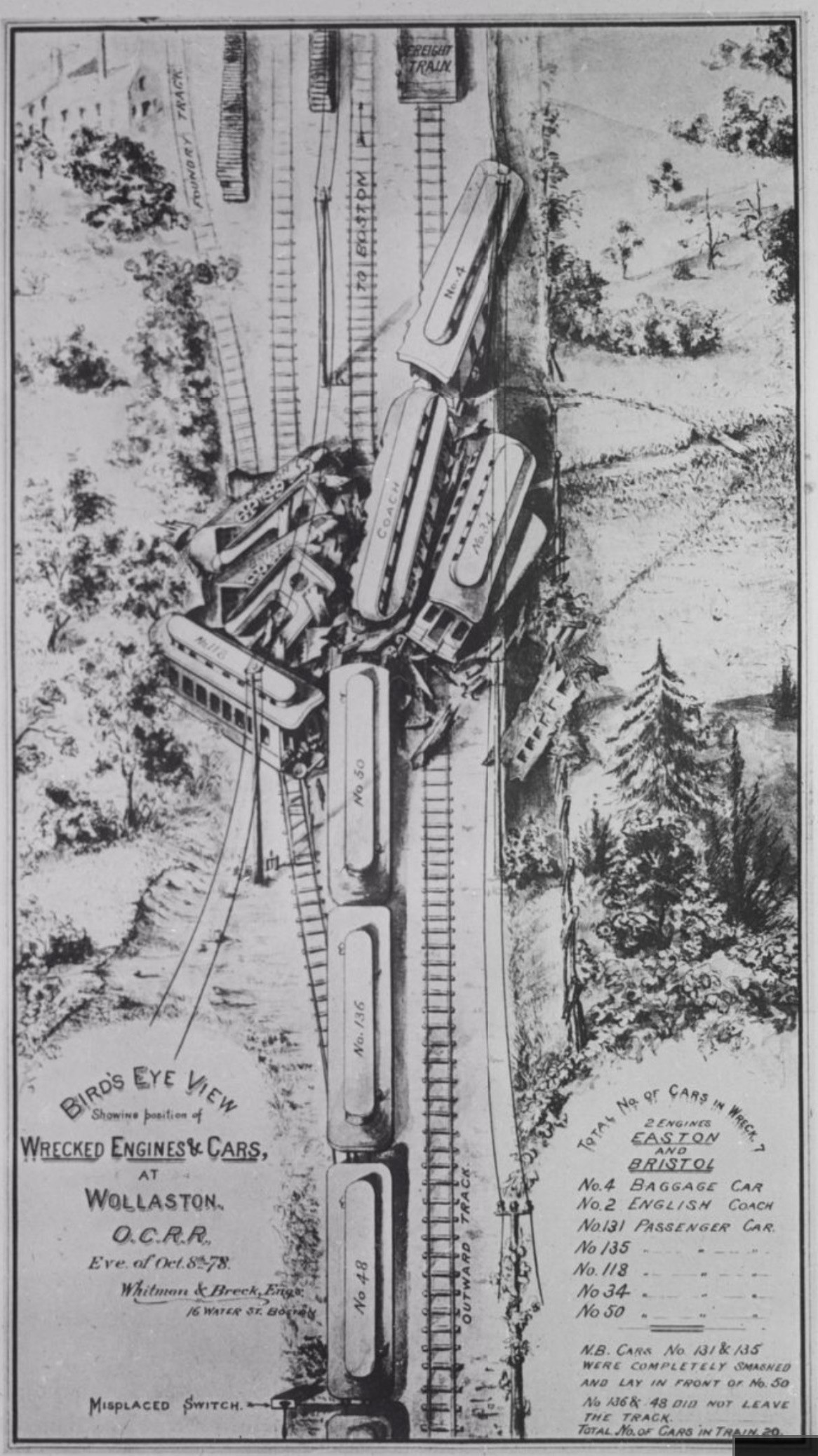
- A drawing of the accident scene

Details
- Date: October 8, 1878 (148 years ago); 7:30 pm
- Location: Wollaston, Quincy, Massachusetts
- Coordinates: 42°16′18″N 71°01′33″W
- Country: United States
- Incident type: Derailment
- Cause: Incorrectly set railroad switch

Statistics
- Trains: 1
- Passengers: 1,600 to 1,800
- Deaths: 19
- Injured: 170

The Wollaston disaster was a railroad accident that occurred on October 8, 1878, in the Wollaston neighborhood of Quincy, Massachusetts. 19 people were killed and 170 were injured when an incorrectly-placed switch caused the derailment of an excursion train returning from a sporting event. The conductor who placed the switch was convicted of manslaughter, but the conviction was overturned on appeal.

== Silver Lake special ==
A special train had been prepared for spectators returning from the well-attended Reagan–Davis sculling race on October 8, 1878, on Silver Lake in Plympton, Massachusetts. (Note: The four-mile (6.4 km) sculling race featured Patrick Reagan of Boston and M. F. Davis of Portland, Maine. Davis won, securing a purse of $2,000 ($66,724 in 2025). Reagan was among those killed in the train wreck.) The train was made up of two locomotives, a baggage car where the racing shells were stored, a compartment coach where race officials, journalists, and one of the principals of the race, Patrick Reagan, were seated, and 20 passenger cars. In total, the special contained 1,600 to 1,800 passengers. The train was not running on a set schedule and, as was traditional with late-running special trains, a notice was sent to railroad employees giving the train the right-of-way after 4 pm. It did not depart Silver Lake until around 6:30 pm.

== Newport freight train ==
At 6:30 pm, the regularly scheduled Newport local freight train departed Boston. The train, which consisted of an engine and 15 freight cars, was short-staffed as one of the brakemen had gone home sick earlier that day. It was against the rules of the road for the train to go out; however, the conductor, Charles H. Hartwell, incorrectly assumed that the Silver Lake special had already reached Boston and he was not informed to the contrary. He was instructed to pick up five empty flatcars from the Wollaston Foundry siding. When the train reached the foundry, two switches were opened in order to move the cars across the outward track to the inward track, and the train was divided to place them in the center.

== Accident ==
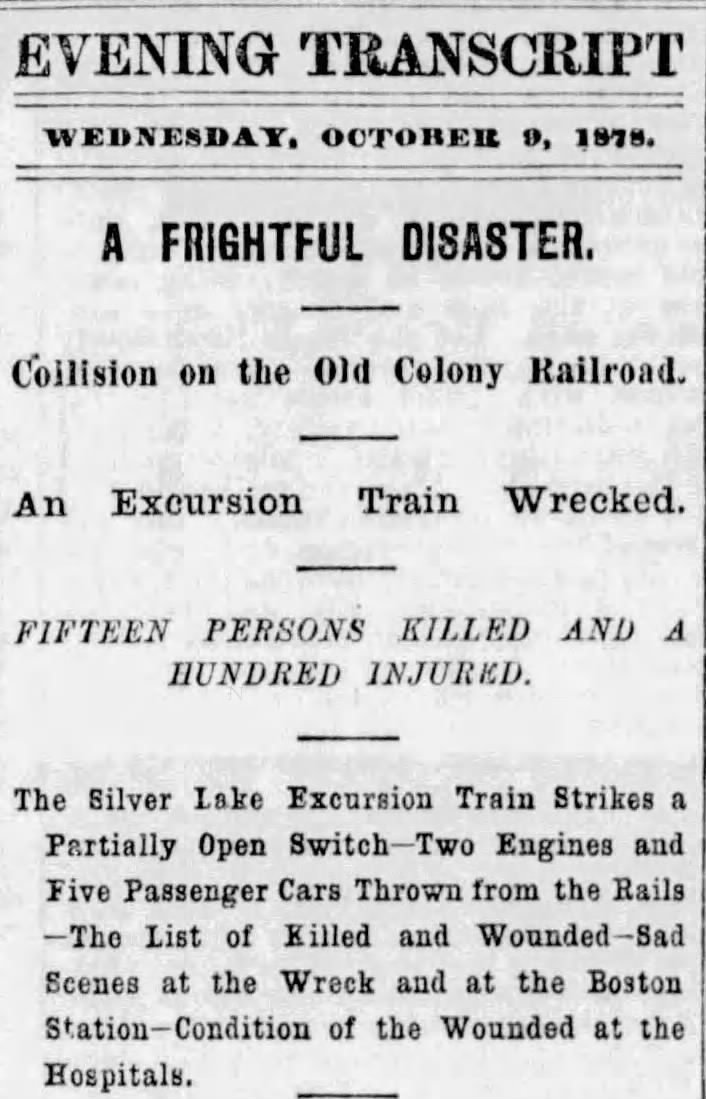
Headline in the Boston Evening Transcript

At around 7:30 pm, the excursion train was seen approaching on the inward track. The freight train's engineer was able to move his engine and all of the cars attached to it out of the way, but there was not enough time to close the switches. With both switches set wrong, the special should have stayed on the rails and stopped on the siding. However, one of the switches was out of line, causing the special to strike the end of the rail and derail.

Several of the excursion train's cars telescoped, the compartment car was smashed, and three or four cars mounted on top of each other. The two locomotives, baggage car, compartment car, and four passenger cars came off the track. The cylinder of the second locomotive entered the side of the compartment car, killing all but one of its occupants; Patrick Reagan was among those killed. A total of 17 passengers and two railroad employees died and 166 passengers and four railroad employees were injured.

== Investigation and trial ==
The Massachusetts Railroad Commission's investigation into the accident found the engineer and conductor of the freight train to be "guilty of gross and criminal negligence" and called for the arrest of the conductor, Hartwell. On October 11, 1878, the Massachusetts Attorney General, Charles R. Train, had Hartwell arrested. Hartwell claimed that he had received written orders from his superior to act in the manner he had when the accident occurred. The following day, Hartwell was arraigned on the charge of manslaughter and held on $10,000 ($333,621 in 2025) bail.

The inquest began on October 16 and concluded the following day. Hartwell admitted that he had not placed warning flags as required. His attorney blamed the accident on the Newport train's headlight, which prevented the engineer of the excursion train from seeing the switch and danger signals until it was only a few hundred feet away. Hartwell was found guilty of gross negligence for running short-staffed and not notifying his managers, allowing his train to stand on the outward track unsignalled, directing his engine to occupy the inward track, and causing the switches to be changed and remain unlocked without leaving the inward track signalled. The engineer of the freight train, Charles H. Hurlburt, was found to be negligent for occupying the inward track without a signal. As for the excursion train, the investigating judge concluded that Charles Westgate should not have been engineer of the lead locomotive due to his inexperience with the road. Lastly, he criticized the lack of communication, stating that if either the freight train or excursion train had been notified of the other's presence, the accident would have been avoided.

Hartwell was tried for manslaughter in the Norfolk County Superior Court beginning on April 22, 1879. On April 24, the jury found him guilty after one hour of deliberation. According to The New York Times, the jurors "would have liked to return a different verdict, but it was impossible" based on the instructions given by the judge. The Times also noted that "the public sympathy for Hartwell appears to be very general and the feeling that he is made a scapegoat is wide-spread".

On February 27, 1880, the Massachusetts Supreme Judicial Court overturned the verdict, holding that the lower court had erred by not requiring the prosecution to prove that Hartwell knew that the arrival of the excursion train was imminent, and that there was no evidence to prove this allegation.

== See also ==
- 1890 Quincy train wreck
- List of disasters in Massachusetts by death toll
