= Gabriel House fire =

2025 building fire in Fall River, Massachusetts

Coordinates: 41.6928°N 71.1662°W

The Gabriel House fire occurred on July 13, 2025, in an assisted living facility in Fall River, Massachusetts. Killing ten residents, it was the deadliest fire in Massachusetts since the 1984 Beverly rooming house fire. Originating in a resident's room, the suspected causes were narrowed down to improper disposal of a cigarette or a malfunction of an oxygen concentrator.

A number of factors contributed to the deaths of residents, including defective sprinkler heads that had not been replaced despite a safety recall, the use of medical oxygen on-site, and the need for a large number of residents to get assistance exiting the building all at the same time. Gabriel House had a long record of poor management before the fire.

Reforms had already been under discussion for the assisted living industry in Massachusetts, but the fire motivated relatively swift adoption of new regulations and the addition of specific measures designed to prevent a similar disaster in the future. New powers for the Executive Office of Aging and Independence and new fire safety regulations went into effect on July 31, 2026, and new consumer protections went into effect on July 17, 2026.
