= Granite Mills =

Historic cotton textile mills in Fall River, Massachusetts, US

Coordinates: 41.7013°N 71.1463°W

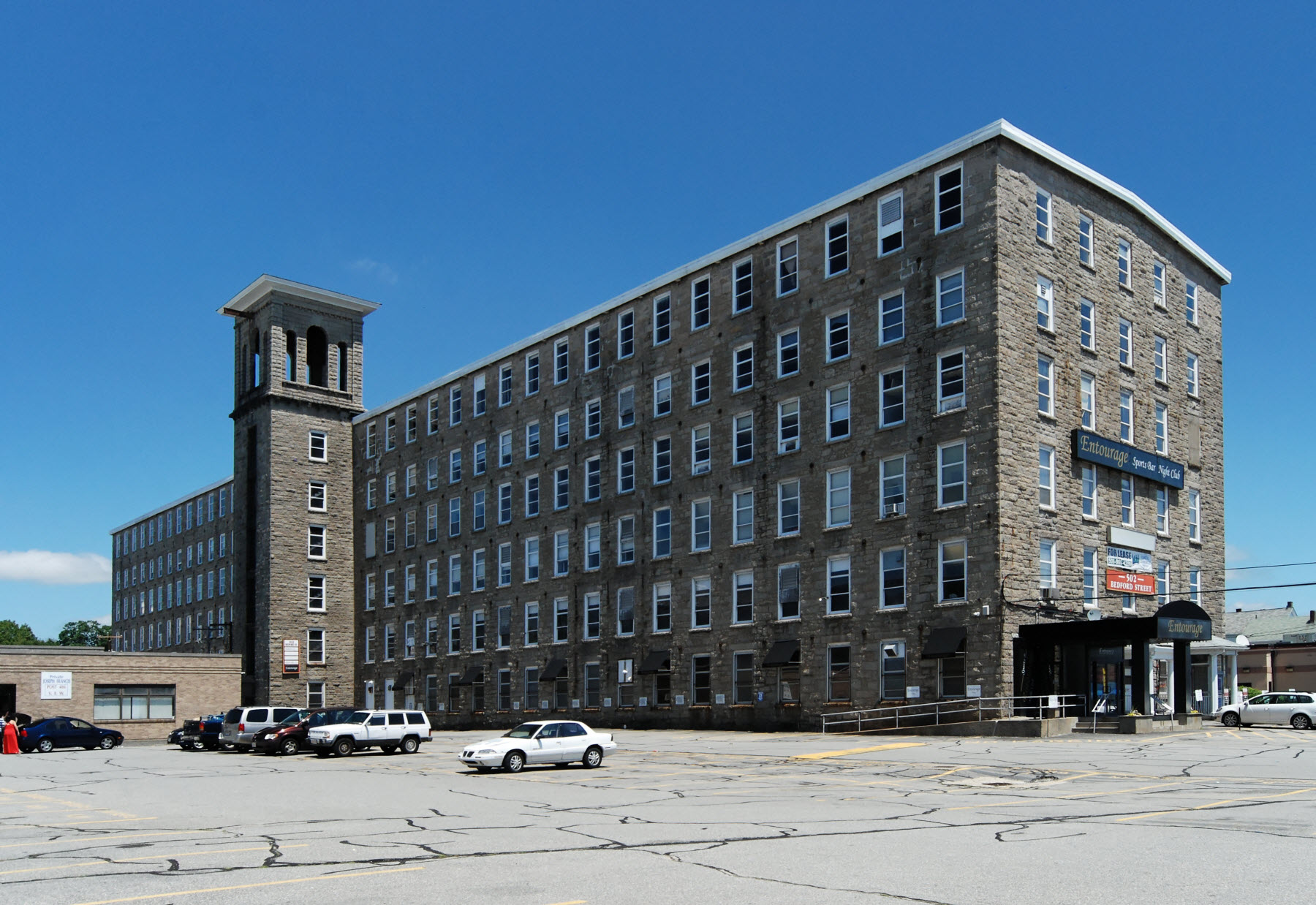
Granite Mill No. 2

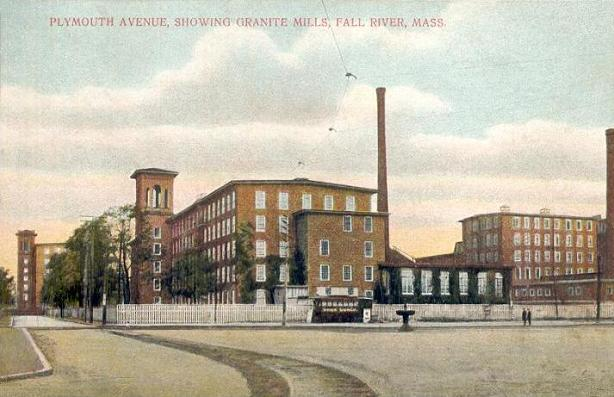
Granite Mills No. 1 and 2

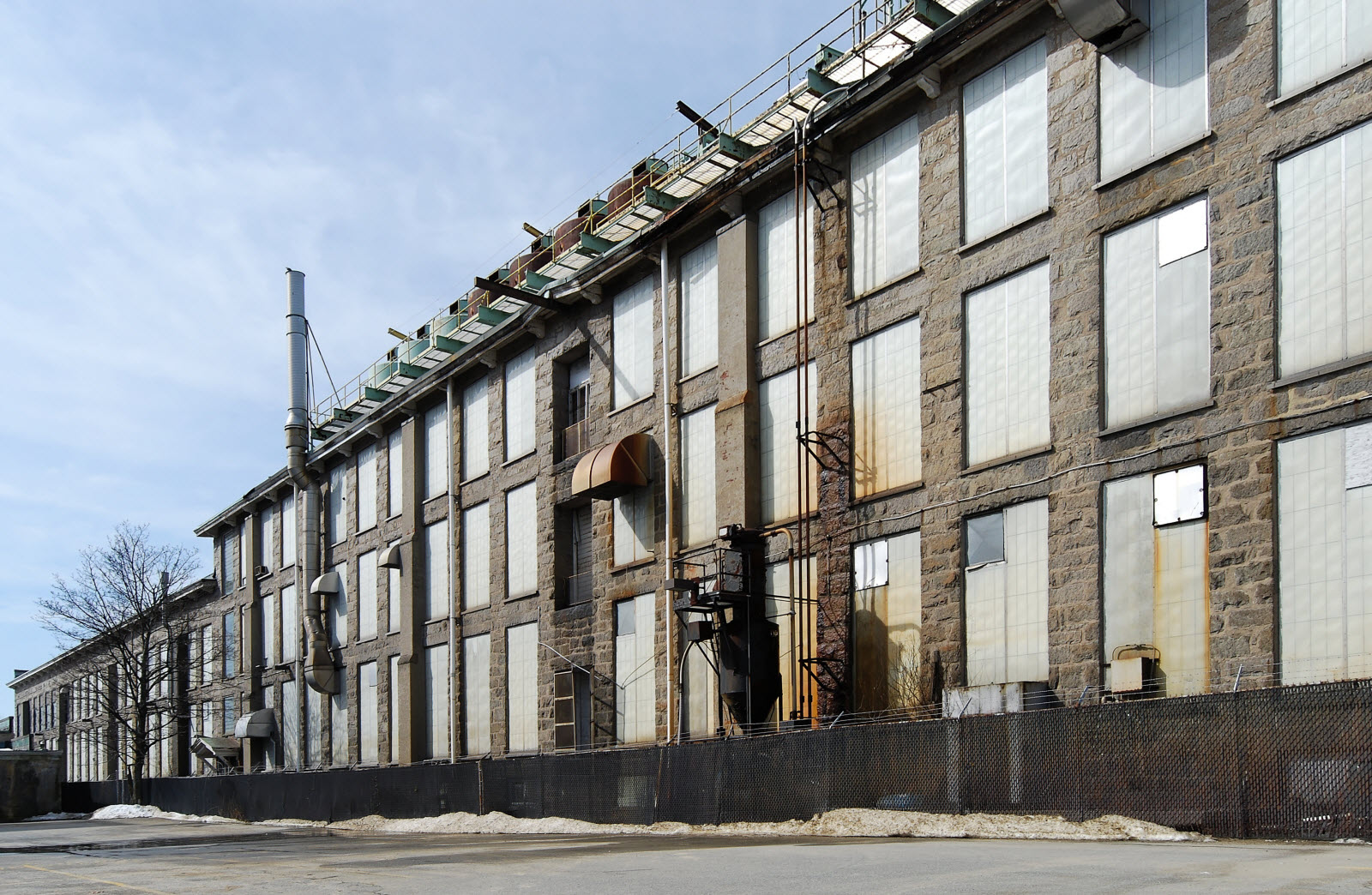
Mill No. 3, built in 1893

Granite Mills are two historic cotton textile mills located on Bedford Street in Fall River, Massachusetts, consisting of Granite Mill No. 2 and Granite Mill No. 3. The site was determined eligible to be listed on the National Register of Historic Places in 1983, but was omitted due to owner's objection.

The mills were organized in 1863 with William Mason as president and Charles O. Shove as treasurer. The original Mill No. 1 was built 1864. It was 328 feet (100 m) long by 70 feet (21 m) wide and five stories high with a barn roof. The mill did not begin operation until January 1865, however. Mill No. 1 was destroyed by fire on September 19, 1874. Twenty three workers were killed in the disaster, and thirty three more were injured. Workers on the upper floors faced a desperate choice, either jump five stories to the ground, or be burned to death.

The Granite Mill fire was widely publicized in the press and became the subject of several folk songs found throughout New England and New York, as well as Nova Scotia, where many of the workers came from. The scandal led to reforms in the design of future mill buildings, requiring multiple exits and fire escapes. Mill No. 1 was soon rebuilt, but with a flat roof and a fire sprinkler system. The rebuilt Mill No. 1 was powered by a 650-horsepower Corliss engine, fed by twenty four boilers.

Mill No. 2 was constructed in 1871 at the corner of Bedford Street and Robeson, from local Fall River granite in the Italianate style. It is 378 feet (115 m) long by 74 feet (23 m) wide. Originally five stories with a barn roof. The sixth floor was flattened to a full story after the tragic 1874 fire in Mill No.1, due to safety concerns. This mill was powered by a 750-horsepower Corliss engine. Water for the steam-powered mills was drawn through a canal from the Quequechan River.

Mill No. 3 was built in 1893, also in granite, but wider and with less ornamentation. It measured 510 feet (160 m) long by 127 feet (39 m) wide. The front half of the mill is two stories, while the rear part is three stories.

The company also built nearly one hundred triple decker tenement houses nearby for the accommodation of its workers. By 1917, the company had a capacity of 122,048 spindles and 3,000 looms. In 1932 the Granite Mills were acquired by the Pepperell Manufacturing Company, and continued to operate into the 1950s.

Mill No. 1 was demolished in 1961 for a supermarket, which later became China Royal restaurant. The site now contains various businesses, including a CVS, Boston Market and a bank.

From 1959, Mill No. 2 was the home of suit maker Anderson-Little until it closed in 1998. The building is now occupied by various businesses.

Mill No. 3 was for many years occupied by Globe Manufacturing, which manufactured rubber-based goods, including Spandex. On July 28, 2011 a smoldering fire start by a spark from a torch during remodeling of the building damaged some of the floor and caused about 10,000 dollars in damage. This mills now contains the Granite Block Global Data Center.

== See also ==
- National Register of Historic Places listings in Fall River, Massachusetts
- List of mills in Fall River, Massachusetts
