= Lawrence bathhouse tragedy =

- Date: June 30, 1913
- Time: 2:00 PM
- Location: Merrimack River Lawrence, Massachusetts; 42°42′00″N 71°10′06″W
- Cause: Collapse of runway railings
- Deaths: 11

The Lawrence bathhouse tragedy occurred on June 30, 1913, when the railings of a runway leading to a municipal bathhouse in Lawrence, Massachusetts gave way and sent 50 to 75 boys into the Merrimack River, causing 11 of them to drown.

== Tragedy ==
June 30 was opening day for Lawrence's bathhouses. A crowd of 50 to 75 boys were waiting on the runway leading to the municipal bathhouses near the end of McFarlin Court for the city's bathhouse keeper, William Blythe, to return from dinner. Around 2 pm, as Blythe approached, the children reportedly began jumping up and down in excitement. Without warning the runway sagged about 18 inches (46 cm) at the end closest to the bathhouses and the railings gave way under the weight of the boys forced against them. Bathers quickly entered the water to assist those who were struggling under the platform. The manager of a nearby boathouse contacted the police and officers with grappling hooks and an ambulance were dispatched to the scene. Physicians were also called to resuscitate the victims.

The first three bodies were recovered by two members of the Lawrence Canoe Club, which was located on the opposite shore. The police recovered the other eight and divers were deployed to look for more, but none were found.

== Aftermath ==
Mayor Michael A. Scanlon ordered the flags on all city buildings to be flown at half-mast. The city council voted to give the families of the deceased children $100 to assist with funeral expenses.

One day after the tragedy, the city's commissioner of public property, John O. Battershill, closed all of the city bathhouses. Battershill stated that the bottom timbers of the 18-year old bathhouses had "become water logged and unsafe". Three builders appointed by Mayor Scanlon to inspect the bathhouse where the accident occurred reported that the lumber in the bathhouses was unsound and recommended that they be condemned. The city's bathhouses never reopened. On August 10, 1913, three of the city's bathhouses, including the one where the children drowned, were destroyed by arson. Police believed that the fires may have been set by one of the parents whose child had died in the disaster.

Judge J. J. Mahoney held an inquest into the disaster. He found that the accident was caused by inadequate support of the runway and railing and that the accident could have been prevented if the runway had been supported by two ledger boards instead of one. He blamed the drownings on Battershill, who was in charge of repairs made to the bathhouse. Battershill resigned shortly after the report was released.

Lawrence was sued by several of the parents, but the Massachusetts Supreme Court ruled that a municipality could not be sued for loss of life at a public place of recreation.

Henry Hinchcliffe, a 16-year old who was reported to have rescued 17 boys, was awarded the Carnegie Medal for Bravery and had his college tuition paid for by the Carnegie Hero Fund.

== See also ==
- List of disasters in Massachusetts by death toll
