= 1958 Westover Air Force Base KC-135 crash =

Westover Air Force Base KC-135 crash
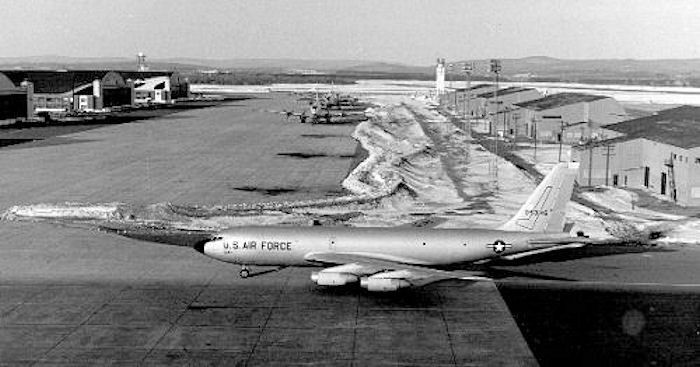
- Different KC-135 at Westover Air Force Base in 1969

Accident
- Date: June 27, 1958
- Summary: Flaps deployed at the incorrect angle
- Site: Chicopee, Massachusetts, US; 42°09′51″N 72°33′34″W

Aircraft
- Aircraft type: Boeing KC-135 Stratotanker
- Operator: United States Air Force
- Registration: 56-3599
- Flight origin: Westover Field
- Occupants: 15
- Passengers: 9
- Crew: 6
- Fatalities: 15
- Survivors: 0

On June 27, 1958, a Boeing KC-135 Stratotanker attempting to break a world speed record crashed shortly after takeoff from Westover Air Force Base, killing all 15 aboard the plane.

== Operation ==
On June 27, 1958, four KC-135s assigned to the 4050th Air Refueling Wing, Eighth Air Force at Westover Air Force Base would seek to break two New York City to London speed records. One pair would attempt to break the record for the fastest non-stop round trip from New York to London. These planes would cross over New York's Idlewild Airport, circle London, then land at Floyd Bennett Field in Brooklyn around noon. The other pair would attempt to break the record for New York to London, stop and refuel at RAF Brize Norton, then immediately attempt to break the London to New York record.

== Accident ==
The first plane, Alpha, took off from Westover at 11:52 p.m. on June 26. The second, Bravo, took off at 12:07 a.m..

At 12:30 a.m., Lt. Col. George Broutsas, commander of the third plane, Cocoa, received take-off clearance. He acknowledged the tower, moved his throttles up, released his brakes, and began to roll. The aircraft slowly picked up speed and left the ground at the proper spot. It struggled to gain altitude and struck a tree top 4,100 feet (1,200 m) from the end of the runway, which caused the KC-135's right wing to dip and dig into the ground.

Its uplifted left wing struck high-voltage power lines and the plane skidded across a cornfield and the Massachusetts Turnpike before exploding. The aircraft, which was heavy with fuel for the non-stop trip to London, sprayed jet fuel as it hit the ground, which set fire to the roadbed, a barn, and the surrounding woods.

The flight of the fourth KC-135 was canceled after the accident. The two already in the air, Alpha and Bravo, continued to London and broke the world record. Alpha reached London in 5:27:42.8 and Bravo arrived in 5:29:37.4, shattering the previous record of 7 hours, 29 minutes. Rather than immediately returning to New York, they landed outside London and stayed there until June 29.

The crash was the first involving the Boeing KC-135 Stratotanker, which had flown over 7.8 million miles (12.6 million kilometres) without accident.

== Victims ==
On board Cocoa was Brig. Gen. Donald W. Saunders, commander of the 57th Air Division and leader of the operation, a six-member crew, two civilian observers from the National Aeronautic Association (William J. Cochran and William R. Enyart), and six members of the press. The journalists killed in the crash were:

- Robert Sibley, aviation editor of the Boston Herald Traveler
- Brig. Gen. (ret.) A. Robert Ginsburgh, military reporter for U.S. News & World Report
- Glenn A. Williams, associate editor of U.S. News & World Report
- Norman Montellier, foreign affairs reporter for United Press International
- Daniel J. Coughlin Jr., Boston reporter for the Associated Press
- James L. McConaughy Jr., Washington bureau chief for Time and Life and son of former Connecticut governor James L. McConaughy

== Investigation ==
The crash was investigated by the United States Air Force with the assistance of the Civil Aeronautics Administration and the Civil Aeronautics Board. The two civilian agencies sought any information that would affect the KC-135's civilian counterpart, the Boeing 707, which was soon to be put in operation.

On September 30, 1958, the Air Force release its report, which determined that there was no structural failure of the KC-135 and there were no issues with its engine. The probable cause of the accident was found to be complications caused by flaps that were deployed at an incorrect angle.

== Lawsuits ==
In 1960, the families of James McConaughy and Glenn A. Williams sued the United States government for a total of $1,040,000 ($11.3 million in 2025), alleging that the plane was overloaded and the flaps were used excessively during takeoff. In 1963, Maureen A. Montellier, the widow of Norman J. Montellier, received a $168,000 judgment ($1.77 million in 2025).

== See also ==
- List of disasters in Massachusetts by death toll
