= Morewood Lake Ice Company explosion =

1910 explosion in Massachusetts

- Date: December 29, 1910
- Time: 9:30 am
- Location: Morewood Lake Pittsfield, Massachusetts
- Cause: Boiler exceeding its strength due to a faulty pressure gauge
- Deaths: 17
- Injuries: 20

The Morewood Lake Ice Company explosion occurred on December 29, 1910, at the company's plant in Pittsfield, Massachusetts. Twelve men were killed in the boiler explosion and five more died from their injuries.

== Explosion ==
The explosion occurred on the first day of the ice harvesting season. Around 125 men, mostly Italian and Polish immigrants, gathered in and around the boiler house of the Morewood Lake Ice Company waiting for work. The boiler was a second-hand locomotive boiler that had been purchased from a saw-mill in 1906. It was only used for two to three weeks out of the year when ice was being harvested. The boiler had been inspected in the spring of 1910 and after changes were made, it was permitted by a state inspector to operate at 70 psi (480 kPa).

At 9:30 am, a violent explosion blew the boiler to pieces and sent fragments of iron and timber through the air. Men 400 yards (370 m) away from the boiler house had to dodge debris and a 300-pound (140 kg) piece of the boiler flew over 300 yards (270 m) and cut off five 30-foot-high (9.1 m) treetops. 12 people were killed almost instantly. Some of the bodies were thrown as far as 100 to 200 feet (30 to 61 m) away from the boiler.

The blast could be heard throughout Pittsfield and shook windows as far as one mile (1.6 km) away. Physicians, ambulances, and automobiles rushed to the scene. The injured were transported to the House of Mercy and the dismembered bodies were gathered up and brought to their families. Five people died from injuries they suffered in the explosion.

== Cause ==
Judge Charles Burke presided over an inquest into the explosion. At the inquest, witnesses testified that on the morning of the explosion, the engineer removed the cap from the safety valve, as he believed it out of order because the boiler blew off at a pressure of 35 to 40 psi (240 to 280 kPa) when it was set for 80 psi (550 kPa). This generated excessive pressure, which, due to a defect or plugging up of the fittings, was not shown by the pressure gauge. As a result, the strength of the boiler was exceeded and it exploded. In his final report, Burke found the cause of the explosion to be the compression screw on the valve and false reading on the gauge, which was attributed to clogging caused by rust from the boiler pipes. He ruled that no "unlawful act[s] of any person now alive contributed to the death of said decedents."

As a result of the accident, Massachusetts adopted stricter regulations regarding boilers.

== See also ==
- List of disasters in Massachusetts by death toll
