= United States Cartridge Company explosion =

Explosion in Lowell, Massachusetts

- Date: July 29, 1903
- Time: 10:15 am
- Location: 42°37′17″N 71°17′44″W
- Cause: Chemical reaction
- Deaths: 22

The United States Cartridge Company explosion occurred on July 29, 1903, in present-day Lowell, Massachusetts. The explosion of two buildings used to store dynamite and gunpowder killed 22 people and destroyed 13 homes.

== Explosion ==
The United States Cartridge Company owned two 20-by-20-foot (6.1 m × 6.1 m) brick magazines on the edge of the Concord River in Tewksbury's Wigginville neighborhood (the neighborhood was annexed to the City of Lowell in 1905). They shared ownership of one of these buildings with the Nichols & Fletcher estate, who leased their third of the building to the American Powder Company for the storage of dynamite. The other building, located 200 feet (61 m) away, was leased to DuPont for the storage of gunpowder. Each building could hold 2.5 tons of explosives. When the buildings were constructed, there were no houses within 1.5 miles (2.4 km) of them. However, the creation of a trolley line through the area in 1897 resulted in French-Canadian laborers settling here.

On the morning of July 29, 1903, U.S. Cartridge employees went to the building to remove the company's cans so that carpenters could work the floor. After all of the cans had been removed, smoke was observed coming out of the dynamite section of the building. At 10:15 am, the American Powder Company's dynamite exploded, which ignited the gunpowder. The explosion triggered a similar blast in the second structure. The explosions killed 17 people and the men who were working closest to the building when it exploded were so badly dismembered that their bodies were never found. The 13 homes closest to the explosion caught fire and were flattened. A total of 67 residences were damaged and 15 families were left homeless. Five more people died from their injuries, bringing the total number of deaths to 22.

== Investigation ==
Judge Samuel P. Hadley of the Lowell Police Court presided over an inquest into the deaths caused by the explosions. According to Hadley's report, the disaster was caused by carpentry foreman Clarendon Goodwin, who poured an unknown substance onto the floor to clean it. This caused a chemical reaction with spilled nitroglycerin which was hastened by scrubbing the floor with a broom. He also held the government of Tewksbury responsible for the deaths because they did not shut down the magazines after a neighborhood was built near them. Lastly, he found that the United States Cartridge Company, American Powder Company, and DuPont were responsible because they did not move their explosives from the area even though they knew it posed a threat to the lives of the people who lived near the magazines.

== Lawsuits ==
The United States Cartridge Company and American Powder Company settled about 170 claims for damages out of court. The estates of four of the deceased went to trial and were awarded $4,500 ($161,250 in 2025) each. The decision was appealed to the Massachusetts Supreme Judicial Court, which upheld the verdict.

== See also ==
- List of disasters in Massachusetts by death toll
