= United States Cartridge Company =

American cartridge ammunition manufacturer

Coordinates: 42°37′55.73″N 71°18′7.79″W

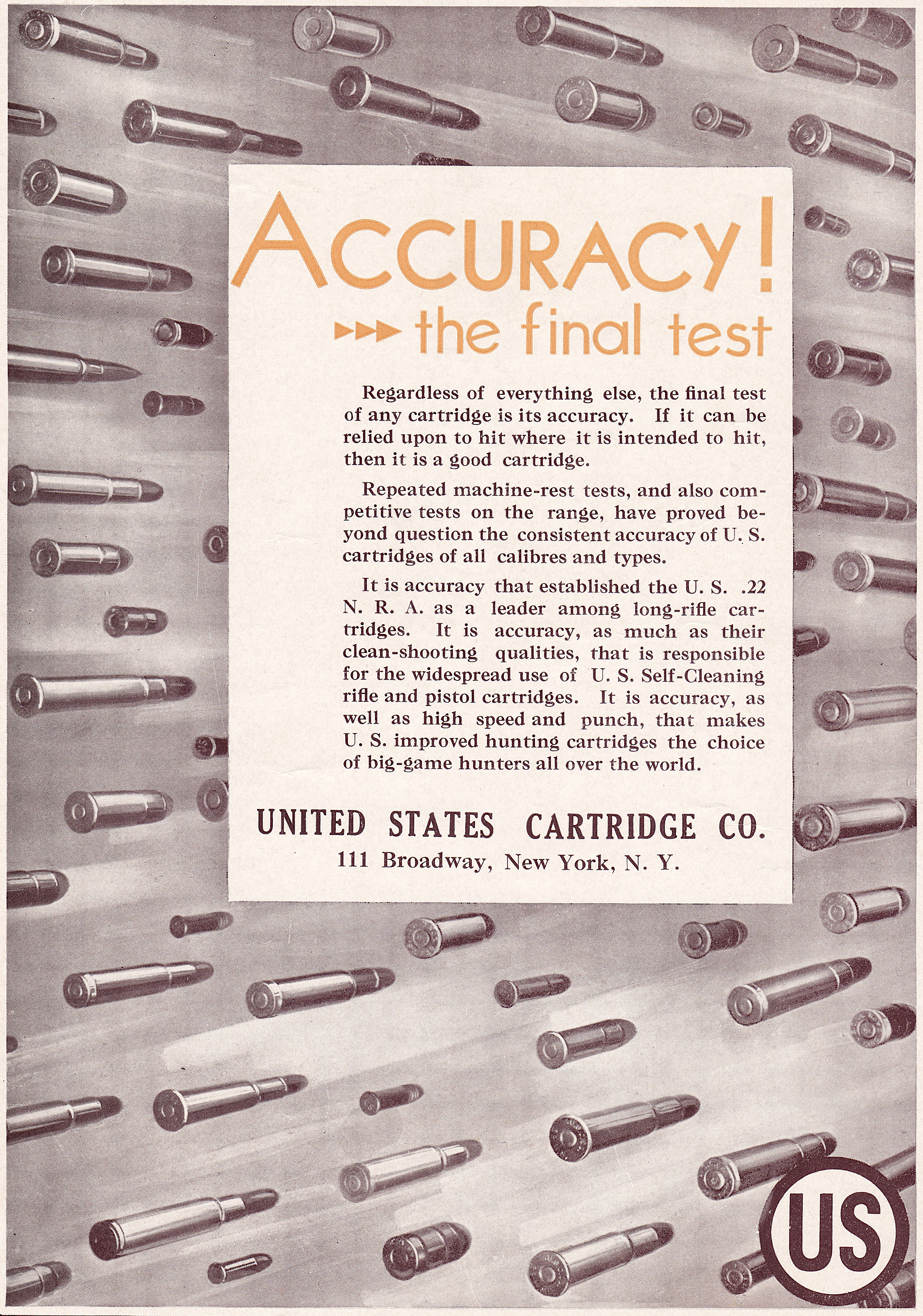
- Company type: Private
- Industry: Weapons
- Founded: 1869
- Founder: Benjamin Butler
- Headquarters: Lowell, Massachusetts, United States
- Products: Ammunition

The United States Cartridge Company was an early manufacturer of cartridge ammunition for small arms. The company was founded in 1869 by American Civil War general Benjamin Butler. Company startup was during the most rapid evolution of cartridge design to date. Lowell, Massachusetts emerged as one of the most successful cartridge producers in the United States while Butler served as a congressman from Massachusetts from 1867 to 1879 and as governor from 1883 to 1884. After supplying 65 percent of American small arms ammunition production for World War I, the company was acquired by the owner of Winchester Repeating Arms; and the Lowell factory closed as manufacturing shifted to New Haven, Connecticut.

== Butler family ==
Benjamin Butler, a lawyer who grew up on Lowell, became a major shareholder of Middlesex Mills in the 1850s; because of his successful law practice he was one of Lowell's wealthiest residents at the end of the Civil War. With other local capitalists, he formed the Wamesit Power Company, the United States Bunting Company, and the United States Cartridge Company. Patent attorney Joe V. Meigs invented an improved metallic cartridge for the company; and oversaw production beginning in 1869. Meigs was replaced in the mid-1870s by Charles Dimon, who had been an officer under Butler's command during the Civil War. By the early 1880s, the company employed 250 workers producing cartridges, paper-shot-shells, and primers. Paul Butler assumed control of the company when his father died in 1893. Benjamin Butler's grandson, Butler Ames, replaced Charles Dimon in 1902.

== Boom years ==
A 29 July 1903 powder magazine explosion in Tewksbury, Massachusetts destroyed or damaged seventy homes killing 22 employees and residents and injuring 70 more. New brick magazines and factories replaced early wooden structures prior to World War I.

The company employed 1,200 when British purchasing agents arrived in September 1914 to request expanded production. Bigelow-Hartford Carpet Company which emerged months earlier from a merger and was moving its production to Connecticut (the process finished in 1916) was happy to lease space in a carpet factory in Lowell, built by the Lowell Manufacturing Co., and a new ammunition factory was built in South Lowell. As employment swelled to 15,000, a labor strike in the autumn of 1915 was resolved within a month to sustain ammunition production. A total of 2,262,671,000 military cartridges were manufactured for the United Kingdom, Russia, the Netherlands, Italy, France, and the United States.

== New owners and locations ==
National Lead Company purchased a controlling stock interest after Paul Butler died in 1918. Cartridge manufacturing machinery was moved from Lowell to New Haven in 1926 where manufacturing continued under the Winchester name after the Lowell plants closed on 1 January 1927.

Winchester was purchased by Olin Corporation on 22 December 1931. Olin used their subsidiary United States Cartridge Company to build and operate the Saint Louis Ordnance Plant manufacturing military small arms ammunition in St. Louis through World War II.
