= Granite Mill fire =

1874 industrial fire in Fall River, Massachusetts

- Date: Granite Mill fire
- Time: 6:50 AM
- Location: Granite Mill No. 1 13th Street Fall River, Massachusetts; 41.6997°N 71.146°W
- Cause: Oiled cotton waste ignited by hot machinery
- Deaths: 23
- Injuries: 36
- Coroner: Andrew W. M. White
- Charges: None

The Granite Mill fire occurred on September 19, 1874, at the Granite Mills in Fall River, Massachusetts. The blaze killed 23 employees, most of them children.

== Fire ==
At 6:50 am, only 20 minutes into the work day, a fire broke out on the fourth floor of Granite Mill No. 1. This floor contained the spinning mule department where 100 girls worked under the supervision of a male overseer. The fire started in the northwest corner of the spinning mule room when friction from a mule head ignited oiled cotton and other combustible waste lying around the mule. This was not uncommon and these fires could usually be contained by a bucket of water. However, on this occasion the mill workers could not contain the fire.

The fire progressed slowly through the bottom three floors of the building, which allowed those working there to escape without injury. However, it quickly spread up the tower containing the building's staircase, rendering it unusable to those on the fifth and sixth floors, where the mill's youngest employees worked. The fire alarm could not be heard on the sixth floor and no one from the lower floors alerted the sixth floor of the fire. Thus, they were unaware of the fire until smoke had already filled the sole staircase. Although the building had fire escapes, they did not extend to the sixth floor and the fire department's ladders were not long enough to reach it. Some employees were able to escape by climbing down a cotton rope, however it eventually burnt. Many of those trapped on the sixth floor suffered fatal injuries jumping the 60 feet (18 m) from the windows and missing the straw and mattresses provided by people on the ground.

Alarms in the mill and on nearby streets were sounded to alert the fire department, however this caused confusion as to the location of the fire. As a result, fire engines did not arrive until 15 minutes after the blaze began, by which time the mill was completely engulfed in flames. Four firemen were injured in the blaze.

The fire burned until around 11:30 am and the recovery of bodies began almost immediately and went until around 5:00 p.m. A number of bodies were so badly burnt or disfigured that they could not be easily identified.

== Aftermath ==
In the aftermath of the fire, the Fall River Fire Department was criticized for their response. Chief Holden Durfee was accused of becoming paralyzed by fear and losing control of his men and the ladder company was criticized for not splicing their ladders together so they could reach the top floor. The Granite Mills also faced criticism for not providing adequate means of escape.

On September 21, 1874, coroner Andrew W. M. White convened a jury for an inquest into the deaths that occurred in Granite Mill No. 1. Forty-nine witnesses were called to testify. The inquest closed on September 29, and the jury returned its verdict on October 3. The jury found that the fire department responded as quickly as possible given the confusion caused by four different fire boxes being pulled at the same time. The jury did fault the department's hook and ladder trucks as insufficient and poorly handled but did not find any other issue with the department. It also found that on the day of the fire, the mill's tanks, pumps, pipes, and hoses were lacking water. The jury found that many of the deaths on the sixth floor could have been prevented if those working there had been notified of the fire sooner, as the alarm could only be heard on the floor it was sounded. They also criticized the male employees working on the sixth floor, as the jurors believed that if they had not become so panic-stricken that they would have been able to properly lead all of the women and children out of the building before the stairs caught fire. Lastly, the jury found that the loss of life would have been avoided if the sixth floor had been constructed with an adequate number of escapes.

Some of the survivors sued the mill company for not an adequate exit from the sixth floor. One employee, Ellen Jones, had her case go all the way to the Massachusetts Supreme Judicial Court, however, Massachusetts had a fellow servant standard which held that owners were employees of their corporation and that a corporation could not be held liable for injuries done by one employee to another.

As a result of the fire, mills were constructed with flat roofs, as the sloped roof of Granite Mill No. 1 made it difficult for firefighters to get on it and fight the fire.

== In Popular Media ==
The disaster is the subject of the song "Granite Mills" by Alison Krauss and Union Station. The song, written by Timothy Eriksen, narrates the fate of the mill workers who died in the fire and their attempts to escape the inferno, though the song wrongly claims that "three hundred people lost their lives in the flames of the burning mill", as opposed to the 23 that actually died. (The higher number of fatalities in the song may have been due to Eriksen conflating this fire with either the Triangle Shirtwaist Factory fire and/or the Ali Enterprises garment factory fires.)

== See also ==
- List of disasters in Massachusetts by death toll
