= Beverly rooming house fire =

1984 arson attack in Beverly, Massachusetts

- Date: July 4, 1984 (42 years ago)
- Time: Around 4:00 a.m.
- Location: Elliott Chambers 434 Rantoul Street Beverly, Massachusetts, U.S.; 42°33′17″N 70°52′54″W
- Cause: Undetermined
- Deaths: 15
- Injuries: 11
- Convictions: One suspect convicted of second-degree murder and arson in 1989; overturned in 2025

The Beverly rooming house fire occurred at the Elliott Chambers, a low-rent rooming house in Beverly, Massachusetts, on July 4, 1984. Prosecutors alleged the fire was set by a man whose ex-girlfriend dated someone who lived in the building, eventually convicting James Carver of second-degree murder and arson. It was the deadliest fire in Massachusetts since the Cocoanut Grove fire in 1942, and the deadliest fire in Beverly's history. Carver maintains his innocence—in 2024 he was granted a retrial and was released from prison; his conviction was formally overturned in February 2025. Prosecutors are appealing the decision to overturn the conviction.

== Background ==
The fire occurred in the Elliott Chambers, an 80-year-old, three-story wooden frame building with 34 rooms on the top two floors and businesses on the first. The rooming house was located on the corner of Rantoul and Elliott Streets in downtown Beverly and catered to deinstitutionalized mental patients, intellectually disabled people, substance abusers, elderly, transients, and other low-income individuals, many of whom were placed there by the Massachusetts Department of Mental Health or another human services agency. The small rooms cost $150 to $175 per month and contained a bed, sink, refrigerator, and bureau. Residents shared common bathrooms.

The rooming house was owned by David and Pauline Faxler and managed by 73-year-old Hattie Whary. It was valued between $100,000 and $150,000. It had working smoke detectors, fire extinguishers, and emergency lights, and a fire escape, but did not contain firewalls, fire stops, or sprinklers. According to the city's mayor, building inspector, and fire chief it met the minimum standards for safety.

== Fire ==
The fire broke out around 4 a.m. on July 4, 1984. According to a report by the National Fire Protection Association, the fire started in an alcove, moved across flammable wooden paneling above it, and spread through the building via an unenclosed stairway. The fire moved so quickly that it reached the top floor by the time the fire alarm had sounded. By the time most residents were awakened, passage to the fire escape was blocked. The Beverly Fire Department responded within two minutes of receiving the alarm. The second and third floors were gutted while the first floor was relatively intact.

At the time of the fire there were 33 residents and three guests in the building. Thirteen people died in the fire. The second floor victims burned to death while those on the third floor died from smoke inhalation. Five were found near a locked fire escape door and six were still in bed. A fourteenth victim died after jumping from a third story window. 12 survivors were taken to area hospitals. One firefighter and one police officer were also hospitalized. Some of the bodies were so badly burned they were difficult to identify. The final victims were not identified until July 8 when doctors were able to identify them using dental and x-ray records. On August 5, the fire's fifteenth victim died at Brigham and Women's Hospital from burn injuries.

== Investigation ==
On July 5, 1984, state Public Safety Secretary Charles V. Barry announced that a preliminary investigation indicated the cause of the fire was arson. According to investigators, the fire was caused by gasoline-soaked newspapers being lit in an alcove adjacent to the front entrance to the rooming house.

The prime suspect in the arson was James Carver, a 20-year-old part-time pizza cook and taxi driver whose ex-girlfriend was dating someone staying in the building. Carver was committed to a mental hospital within a week of the fire and attempted suicide shortly thereafter. The investigation stalled until late 1987, when the Essex County district attorney's office received information that Carver had confessed to a female friend. On April 21, 1988, a witness identified Carver in a police lineup as the man he saw near the Elliott Chambers shortly before the fire.

Investigative techniques were cited as a factor in the later overturning of Carver's convictions; eyewitnesses were allegedly shown pictures of Carver multiple times before identifying him. Investigators also may have relied on what the fire investigation field now believes to be "myths" to support their conclusions.

== Trials ==
On May 4, 1988, nearly four years after the fire, Carver was arrested. He pleaded not guilty to 15 counts of second-degree murder, 15 counts of assault and battery with intent to murder, and one count of arson.

Carver's trial began on March 7, 1989. On March 24, Judge Peter F. Brady declared a mistrial based on a motion from Carver's attorney, Dennis F. Jackson, who contended that the prosecution had violated discovery procedures by not providing him with an incriminating statement a witness had given to police until the trial was already underway. District Attorney Kevin M. Burke called Brady's decision "inappropriate" and "unjust" and declared that his office would "vigorously reprosecute" the case.

Carver's second trial was held in November 1989. The prosecution alleged that in October 1984, Carver told a friend that he set the fire and how he did so, and in November 1986 told a co-worker that he lit the fire but was going to get away with it. The prosecution also presented a witness who testified that a day before the fire Carver had threatened Rick Nickerson, the Elliott Chambers resident who had gone out with Carver's ex-girlfriend. Carver's parents contended that he was home in bed when the fire occurred.

On November 22, 1989, Carver was found guilty of murder and arson. He was sentenced to two consecutive life sentences to be served as the maximum-security Massachusetts Correctional Institution – Cedar Junction with eligibility for parole after 30 years.

== Later legal proceedings ==
Carver became eligible for parole in 2018 but declined to seek it because he did not want to accept responsibility for a crime he says he did not commit.

In 2020, citing a history of cardiovascular disease, skin cancer, and depression, along with using a wheelchair due to dizziness, vertigo, tremors and seizures he suffered following brain surgery, as well as being diagnosed with prostate cancer (which he was refusing treatment for), Carver sought a medical parole on the grounds that he was "highly likely" to become incapacitated if he contracted COVID-19. His petition was denied by the state commissioner of corrections and the decision was upheld by a Superior Court judge. In 2023, the Massachusetts Supreme Judicial Court upheld the corrections commissioner's decision.

In 2022, attorneys from the state public defender's office and Boston College Law School's Innocence Program petitioned for a new trial, arguing that modern fire science shows there was no evidence the fire was started with gasoline and that it might have been accidental. This was Carver's fifth attempt at obtaining a new trial. His previous efforts focused on other potential suspects and ineffective counsel. In 2024, Carver was granted a retrial and released on personal recognizance. The Essex County district attorney's office appealed the ruling. In February 2025, Carver's conviction was formally overturned, with the judge citing advances in eyewitness science and fire investigation techniques as the most compelling factors in such a ruling.

Prosecutors are appealing the ruling to overturn Carver's conviction. Oral arguments in the appeal were heard on May 13, 2026.

== Effect on building codes ==
In the wake of the fire, Mayor F. John Monahan called on the state legislature to strengthen the state's fire code. Legislators and local officials called for a law to require sprinklers and other fire safety systems in rooming houses. Governor Michael Dukakis opposed such a law, as it would drive up the cost of housing. A proposed law requiring sprinklers in stairways of residential buildings died in the legislature due to opposition from building owners. However, in 1986 the legislature passed a bill that gave local governments the option to require automatic sprinklers in buildings occupied by six or more unrelated people. During the early 1980s, the state saw an average of between seven and nine fire deaths per year in rooming houses. After the law was passed, this number decreased quickly, with zero deaths occurring in 1992. As of 2014, 134 of the state's 351 municipalities have adopted the measure.

== Memorial ==
The Elliott Chambers building was rebuilt into a two-story professional office building. In 2009, it was demolished and replaced by a CVS Pharmacy. A plaque listing the names of the fire's victims was placed on the corner of Elliott and Rantoul Streets.

== See also ==
- List of disasters in Massachusetts by death toll
