= List of boiler explosions =

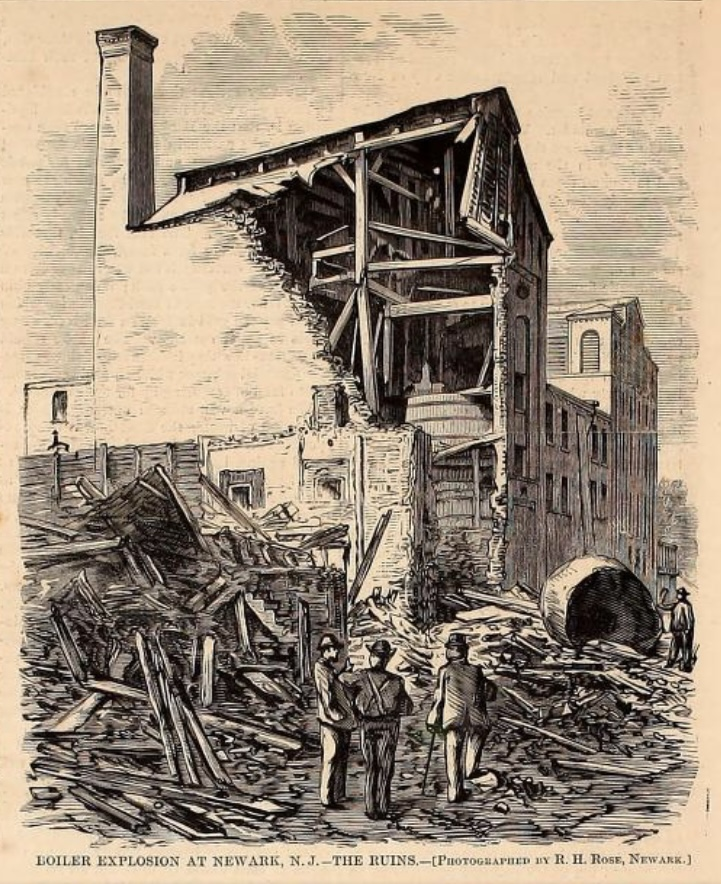
Etching of damage from a boiler explosion in Newark, New Jersey in 1867

This is a list of steam boiler explosions such as railway locomotive, marine transport (military and civilian), and stationary power:

== Events ==
| Event | Date | Type | Nation | City/Locale | Killed | Injured | Missing | References |
|---|---|---|---|---|---|---|---|---|
| Savery explosion | 1716 | Industrial | United Kingdom | | 1 | | | |
| Brunton's Mechanical Traveller | 31 July 1815 | Locomotive | United Kingdom | Philadelphia, England | 16 | | | |
| SS Washington | 1816 | Marine (civilian) | United States | Marietta, Ohio | 12 | 5 | | |
| SS Constitution | 1817 | Marine (civilian) | United States | Mississippi River | 30 | | | |
| The Aetna | 15 May 1824 | Marine (civilian) | United States | New York City, New York | 10 | 40 | | |
| SS Teche | 1825 | Marine (civilian) | United States | Mississippi River | 20 | | | |
| Stockton and Darlington Railway locomotive no. 2 or no. 5 | 19 March 1828 | Locomotive | United Kingdom | Simpasture, near Shildon, England | 1 | 1 | | |
| Stockton and Darlington Railway Locomotion No. 1 | 1 July 1828 | Locomotive | United Kingdom | Aycliffe Lane, Heighington, England | 1 | | | |
| SS Helen McGregor | 24 February 1830 | Marine (civilian) | United States | Memphis, Tennessee | | | | |
| Best Friend of Charleston | 17 June 1831 | Locomotive | United States | Charleston, South Carolina | 1 | 3 | | |
| Locomotive under test | November 1834 | Locomotive | United States | Baltimore and Ohio Railroad, Baltimore, Maryland | 1 | | | |
| Liverpool and Manchester Railway No. 33 Patentee | 12 November 1834 | Locomotive | United Kingdom | Whiston Bank, Whiston, England | | | | |
| PS Union | 1837 | Marine (civilian) | United Kingdom | Hull, England | 23 | 20 | | |
| SS Moselle | 28 April 1838 | Marine (civilian) | United States | Cincinnati, Ohio | 160 | 13 | | |
| SS Pulaski | 14 June 1838 | Marine (civilian) | United States | Cape Hatteras, North Carolina | 128 | | | |
| New York and Harlem Railroad | 4 July 1839 | Locomotive | United States | 14th Street, New York City, New York | 2 | 5 | | |
| Surprise | 10 November 1840 | Locomotive | United Kingdom | Bromsgrove railway station, Bromsgrove, England | 2 | | | |
| SS Henry Eckford | 27 April 1841 | Marine (civilian) | United States | New York City, New York | 1 | 2 | | |
| SS Medora | 14 April 1842 | Marine (civilian) | United States | Baltimore, Maryland | 23 | 40 | | |
| Philadelphia and Reading Railroad Richmond | 2 September 1844 | Locomotive | United States | Reading, Pennsylvania | 4 | | | |
| London and North Western Railway 122 Goliah | 1847 | Locomotive | United Kingdom | | | | | |
| Great Western Railway Goliah | 29 June 1849 | Locomotive | United Kingdom | Foot of Hemerdon Bank, Plympton, England | 1 | | | |
| London and North Western Railway 401 | 1850 | Locomotive | United Kingdom | Longsight, Manchester, England | | | | |
| Firth Woollen Mill | 1850 | Industrial | United Kingdom | Halifax, England | 12 | 17 | | |
| Hague Street explosion | 4 February 1850 | Industrial | United States | New York City, New York | 67 | 50 | | |
| Midland Railway 363 (ex Bristol and Gloucester Railway 7 Wickwar) | 8 January 1853 | Locomotive | United Kingdom | Clay Hill, Bristol, England | | | | |
| Erie Railroad | 16 June 1853 | Locomotive | United States | Susquehanna, Pennsylvania | 5 | | | |
| SS Canemah | 8 August 1853 | Marine (civilian) | United States | Champoeg, Oregon | 1 | | | |
| SS Shoalwater | May 1853 | Marine (civilian) | United States | Rock Island, Oregon | | | | |
| SS Gazelle | 8 April 1854 | Marine (civilian) | United States | Oregon City, Oregon | 24 | many | | |
| Fieldhouse Mills | 15 July 1855 | Industrial | United Kingdom | Rochdale, England | 10 | 13 | | |
| Georgiana | 23 November 1855 | Marine (civilian) | United States | Petaluma, California | 1 | 2 | 0 | |
| SS Pennsylvania | 13 June 1858 | Marine (civilian) | United States | Memphis, Tennessee | 250 | | | |
| London and North Western Railway 249 | 4 July 1861 | Locomotive | United Kingdom | Rugby, Warwickshire | 1 | | | |
| Erie Railroad | 25 October 1862 | Locomotive | United States | Docks, Jersey City, New Jersey | 5 | | | |
| Great Western Railway Perseus | November 1862 | Locomotive | United Kingdom | Westbourne Park shed, London, England | | | | |
| Hembrigg Mills | 27 June 1863 | Industrial | United Kingdom | Morley, England | 9 | | | |
| SS Ada Hancock | 23 April 1863 | Marine (civilian) | United States | San Pedro Bay, California | 26 | 23 | | |
| Tugboat Greenwood | 15 June 1863 | Marine (civilian) | United States | Barrytown, New York | 7 | 3 | 3 | |
| Calcutta explosion | 1863 | | India | Kolkata | | | | |
| Merrick Sons, Southwark Foundry | 6 April 1864 | Industrial | United States | Philadelphia, Pennsylvania | 7 | 13 | | |
| USS Chenango | 15 April 1864 | Marine (military) | United States | New York City, New York | 28 | 6 | | |
| Midland Railway 356 | 5 May 1864 | Locomotive | United Kingdom | Colne, England | 1 | 2 | | |
| Great Northern 138 | 5 May 1864 | Locomotive | United Kingdom | Metropolitan Railway's Bishop's Road station (now Paddington), London, England | | | | |
| ? 108 | 1864 | Locomotive | United Kingdom | Shrewsbury and Hereford Joint Railway, Leominster, England | | | | |
| New York Central Railroad | 18 June 1864 | Locomotive | United States | Syracuse, New York | 3 | | | |
| USS Tulip | 11 November 1864 | Marine (military) | United States | Potomac River, Maryland | 49 | | | |
| Eclipse (steamboat) | 27 January 1865 | Marine (military) | United States | Tennessee River | 38 | | | |
| Sultana | 27 April 1865 | Marine (civilian) | United States | Memphis, Tennessee | 1169 | | | |
| Staten Island Ferry Westfield II | 30 July 1871 | Marine (civilian) | United States | New York City, New York | 45–91 | 78–208 | | |
| Spa Well Mill | 15 December 1873 | Industrial | United Kingdom | Elland, England | 3 | 4 | | |
| Town & Son Factory | 9 June 1869 | Industrial | United Kingdom | Bingley, England | 15 | | | |
| SS Senator | 6 May 1875 | Marine (civilian) | United States | Portland, Oregon | | | | |
| HMS Thunderer | 14 July 1876 | Marine (military) | United Kingdom | Portsmouth Harbour, England | 45 | 70 | | |
| Boston Stamping Company, under Seavey & Co. | 6 April 1878 | Industrial | United States | East Cambridge, Cambridge, Massachusetts | 3 | 6 | | |
| Railway explosion | 21 December 1881 | Locomotive | Australia | Katoomba, New South Wales | | | | Unverified report |
| SS Erie Belle | 21 November 1883 | Marine (civilian) | Canada | Kincardine, Ontario | 6 | 3 | 0 | |
| Queensland Railways | 1890 | Locomotive | Australia | Queensland | | | | |
| North East Dundas Tramway | 18 June 1892 | Locomotive | Australia | Tasmania | | | | |
| Annie Faxon | 14 April 1893 | Marine (civilian) | United States | Columbia River | 8 | | | |
| Zeehan | 1 May 1899 | Locomotive | Australia | Zeehan, Tasmania | | | | |
| Great Eastern Railway No. 522 | 25 September 1900 | Locomotive | United Kingdom | Westerfield, England | 2 | 2 | | |
| Grover Shoe Factory disaster | 20 March 1905 | Industrial | United States | Brockton, Massachusetts | 58 | 150 | | |
| HMS Implacable | 12 July 1905 | Marine (military) | United Kingdom | | 2 | | | |
| USS Bennington | 21 July 1905 | Marine (military) | United States | San Diego, California | 66 | | | |
| T.J. Salts Lumber Company | 7 August 1905 | Industrial | United States | Del Rio, Tennessee | 5 | 16 | | |
| HMS Implacable | 16 August 1906 | Marine (military) | United Kingdom | | 2 | | | |
| Hemingway Paint & Colour Manufacturers | 23 August 1907 | Industrial | United Kingdom | Millwall, London, England | | 2 | | |
| Central of Georgia Railway | October 12, 1907 | Locomotive | United States | Reynolds, Georgia | 2 | 2 | 0 | |
| Boiler house at Laura coal mine | September 15, 1908 | industrial | Netherlands | Eygelshoven, the Netherlands | 7 | many | | |
| Rhymney Railway 97 | 1909 | Locomotive | United Kingdom | Rhymney Railway's shed, Cardiff, Wales | 3 | 3 | | |
| Morewood Lake Ice Company explosion | 29 December 1910 | Industrial | United States | Pittsfield, Massachusetts | 17 | 20 | | |
| SS Sarah Dixon | 18 January 1912 | Marine (civilian) | United States | Kalama, Washington | 3 | | | |
| Southern Pacific Roundhouse | 18 March 1912 | Locomotive | United States | San Antonio, Texas | 26 | | | |
| Rumney Shed | 21 April 1912 | Locomotive | United Kingdom | Cardiff, Wales | | | | |
| SS City of Liverpool | 24 February 1913 | Marine (civilian) | United Kingdom | Manchester Ship Canal, Runcorn, England | 1 | | | |
| SS James T. Staples | 10 January 1913 | Marine (civilian) | United States | Bladon Springs, Alabama | 26 | 21 | | |
| Destroyer Ikazuchi | 9 October 1913 | Marine (military) | Japan | Ominato | | | | |
| Southern Pacific 4037 | February 14, 1914 | Locomotive | United States | Southern Pacific's San Joaquin Division | | | | |
| Maine Central Railroad | 1915 | Locomotive | United States | Ayers Junction, Pembroke, Maine | | | | |
| Medina-Salamanca Railway No.2 | 10 January 1918 | Locomotive | Spain | Medina del Campo | 15 | 15 | 0 | |
| London and North Western Railway 132 | 11 November 1921 | Locomotive | United Kingdom | Buxton, England | 2 | 1 | | |
| Chicago and North Western 1132 | 17 December 1926 | Locomotive | United States | Glenrock, Wyoming | 1 | | | |
| Southern Pacific 4017 | September 12, 1929 | Locomotive | United States | | | | | |
| LMS 6399 Fury | 10 February 1930 | Locomotive | United Kingdom | | 1 | | | |
| Southern Pacific 4402 | December 25, 1931 | Locomotive | United States | Near Richvale, California | | | | |
| Elkhorn Piney Coal Company | 27 January 1934 | Locomotive | United States | Powellton, West Virginia | 16 | | | |
| Deutsche Reichsbahn 02 101 | 3 April 1939 | Locomotive | Germany | | | | | |
| Southern Pacific 4199 | May 3, 1941 | Locomotive | United States | Cooper, California | 4 | | | |
| Canadian National 242 | 9 August 1941 | Locomotive | Canada | Montreal, Quebec | 1 | 1 | | |
| Pennsylvania Railroad 520 | 14 November 1942 | Locomotive | United States | Cresson, Pennsylvania | 2 | 4 | | |
| SS Cascades | 1943 | Marine (civilian) | United States | Portland, Oregon | | | | |
| New York Central Railroad J-3a No. 5450 while hauling the 20th Century Limited | 7 September 1943 | Locomotive | United States | Canastota, New York | 3 | | | |
| USATC S160 Class | 1943, 1944 | Locomotive | United Kingdom | | | | | |
| Great Northern 2581 | 9 January 1947 | Locomotive | United States | Crary, North Dakota | ? | ? | | |
| Chicago and North Western R-1 | 8 October 1947 | Locomotive | United States | Lake Preston, South Dakota | 1 | | | |
| RL Smith Lumber Company 91 | 14 February 1948 | Locomotive | United States | Canby, California | 2 | 2 | | |
| Chesapeake and Ohio Railway locomotive no. 3020 | 12 May 1948 | Locomotive | USA | Near Chillicothe, Ohio | 3 | 0 | | |
| Union Pacific 9018 | 20 October 1948 | Locomotive | United States | 1.97 miles (3.17 km) east of Upland, Kansas | 3 | | | |
| Deutsche Reichsbahn 95 6679 | 4 May 1951 | Locomotive | East Germany | Meiningen Steam Locomotive Works, Meiningen | 11 | | | |
| Chesapeake and Ohio Railway 1642 | 9 June 1953 | Locomotive | United States | Hinton, West Virginia | 3 | | | |
| British Railways | 24 January 1962 | Locomotive | United Kingdom | Bletchley, England | 0 | 2 | | |
| New York Telephone Company building explosion | 3 October 1962 | Stationary power | United States | New York City, New York | 23 | 94 | | |
| PNKA CC 5002 (Bendul Explosion) | 11 April 1968 | Locomotive | Indonesia | Purwakarta, West Java | 6 | 1 | | |
| USS Basilone | 5 February 1973 | Marine (military) | United States | | 7 | | | |
| Deutsche Reichsbahn 01 1516 | 27 November 1977 | Locomotive | East Germany | Railway station, Bitterfeld | 9 | 45 | | |
| Gettysburg Railroad No. 1278 | 16 June 1995 | Locomotive | United States | Gardners, Pennsylvania | | 2 | | |
| USS Willamette | 29 June 1995 | Marine (military) | United States | | 0 | 7 | | |
| Ford River Rouge complex | 2 February 1999 | Industrial | United States | Dearborn, Michigan | 6 | | | |
| Medina County Fair Ground | 29 July 2001 | Antique steam tractor | United States | Medina County, Ohio | 5 | c. 40 | | |
| SS Norway | 25 May 2003 | Marine (civilian) | United States | Miami, Florida | 8 | 17 | | |
| British Columbia Institute of Technology (BCIT) | 20 May 2005 | Stationary | Canada | Vancouver, British Columbia | | | | |
| St Mary's General Hospital | 15 July 2006 | Stationary | United States | Passaic, New Jersey | | | | |
| Dana Corporation 400-hp fire-tube boiler | 19 June 2007 | Industrial | United States | Paris, Tennessee | | | | |
| Orewa College | 24 June 2009 | Industrial | New Zealand | Orewa, Auckland | 1 | 1 | | |
| Loy-Lange Box Company | 3 April 2017 | Industrial | United States | St. Louis, Missouri | 4 | 3 | | |

== See also ==
- List of boiling liquid expanding vapor explosions
