= List of shipwrecks in April 1838 =

The list of shipwrecks in April 1838 includes ships sunk, foundered, wrecked, grounded, or otherwise lost during April 1838.

== 1 April ==
List of shipwrecks: 1 April 1838
Ship	State	Description
Fortuna	Prussia	The ship was lost off Anholt, Denmark. She was on a voyage from Newcastle upon Tyne, Northumberland, United Kingdom to Königsberg.
Jane	United Kingdom	The ship was driven ashore at Boulogne, Pas-de-Calais, France. She was on a voyage from Sunderland, County Durham to Boulogne. Jane was refloated and taken into Boulogne.
Palace	United Kingdom	The ship was driven ashore and wrecked at Helsea Point, Cornwall. She was on a voyage from Liverpool, Lancashire to Newport, Monmouthshire.
William and Ann	United Kingdom	The ship was driven ashore at Burntisland, Fife.

== 2 April ==
List of shipwrecks: 2 April 1838
Ship	State	Description
Miranda	United Kingdom	The ship was driven ashore and severely damaged on Antigua. She was on a voyage from London to Barbados and Antigua. Miranda was refloated on 5 April and put under repair.

== 3 April ==
List of shipwrecks: 3 April 1838
Ship	State	Description
Andes	United Kingdom	The ship was abandoned in the North Sea off Heligoland. She was on a voyage from Newcastle upon Tyne, Northumberland to Kiel, Prussia.Andes was subsequently beached on Heligoland. She was later refloated and temporary repairs were made before she departed for Cuxhaven in late April.
Jane and Thomas	United Kingdom	The ship was driven ashore and wrecked in Downing's Bay. She was on a voyage from Liverpool, Lancashire to Balbriggan, County Dublin.
Prince George	United Kingdom	The ship was driven ashore at Longhope, Orkney Islands. She was on a voyage from Leith, Lothian to Quebec City, Lower Canada, British North America. Prince George was refloated on 6 April and proceeded on her voyage.

== 6 April ==
List of shipwrecks: 6 April 1838
Ship	State	Description
Harriet	United Kingdom	The sailing barge sank off Dartmouth, Devon. Her crew were rescued. She was on a voyage from Teignmouth to Dartmouth.
Horace	United Kingdom	The ship was wrecked near Kennebunk, Maine, United States. Her crew were rescued. She was on a voyage from New Orleans, Louisiana to Liverpool, Lancashire.

== 7 April ==
List of shipwrecks: 7 April 1838
Ship	State	Description
Delaval	United Kingdom	The ship ran aground on the Newcombe Sand, in the North Sea off the coast of Norfolk. She was on a voyage from Liverpool, Lancashire to Newcastle upon Tyne, Northumberland. Delaval was refloated and taken into Great Yarmouth, Norfolk.
Favourite Nancy	United Kingdom	The ship was driven ashore and sank south of Aberystwyth, Cardiganshire. Her crew were rescued. She was on a voyage from Waterford to Aberavon, Glamorgan. Favourite Nancy was refloated on 13 April and taken into Aberystwyth.
Jane	United Kingdom	The ship foundered in the North Sea off the mouth of the River Tees.
Joseph	United Kingdom	The ship struck the pier and sank at Swansea, Glamorgan. She was on a voyage from St. Ives, Cornwall to Swansea.
Native	United Kingdom	The ship ran aground and was damaged at Teignmouth, Devon. She was on a voyage from Teignmouth to Newfoundland, British North America. Native was refloated and put back to Teignmouth.
Ray	United Kingdom	The ship was wrecked near Holyhead, Anglesey with the loss of five lives. She was on a voyage from Dublin to Gloucester.

== 8 April ==
List of shipwrecks: 8 April 1838
Ship	State	Description
Amiable Mère	France	The ship was wrecked at St Alban's Head, Dorset, United Kingdom. Her crew were rescued. She was on a voyage from Marennes, Charente-Maritime to Dunkirk, Nord.
Belsay Castle	United Kingdom	The ship was wrecked at the mouth of the River Tees with the loss of seven of her ten crew. Survivors were rescued by the Seaton Lifeboat.
Ceres	Norway	The ship sprang a leak in the North Sea and was abandoned. Her crew were rescued. She was on a voyage from Skien to Dunkirk. Ceres was later taken in to Thisted, Denmark.
Deux Amis	France	The ship was wrecked at St Alban's Head. Her crew were rescued. She was on a voyage from Bordeaux, Gironde to Dunkirk.
Dorade	France	The ship ran aground on The Shingles, in the English Channel and was damaged. She was on a voyage from Bordeaux to Boulogne-sur-Mer, Pas-de-Calais. She was refloated on 10 April and taken into Cowes, Isle of Wight, United Kingdom for repairs.
Fanny and Betsey	United Kingdom	The ship foundered in the Irish Sea off Saint Tudwal's Islands, Caernarfonshire.
Margaret	United Kingdom	The schooner was wrecked at Spittal, Northumberland with the loss of her captain. Survivors were saved by the Coast Guard.
Resolution	Norway	The ship sprang a leak and foundered in the North Sea. Her crew were rescued. She was on a voyage from Skien to London, United Kingdom.
Swaine	United Kingdom	The ship was driven ashore and wrecked on the Goodwick Sands, off Fishguard, Pembrokeshire. She was on a voyage from Dublin to Gloucester.
Union	United Kingdom	The ship was driven ashore in Bootle Bay. She was on a voyage from Ostend, West Flanders, Belgium to Liverpool, Lancashire.
William and Ann	United Kingdom	The ship was driven ashore near Scargill, Lothian. Her crew were rescued. She was on a voyage from Inverness to Hull, Yorkshire.
Zeeuw	Netherlands	The ship was wrecked on the Banjaard Sand, in the North Sea with the loss of two lives. She was on a voyage from Batavia, Netherlands East Indies to Middelburg, Zeeland.

== 9 April ==
List of shipwrecks: 9 April 1838
Ship	State	Description
Agenoria	United Kingdom	The ship was driven ashore and wrecked at Filey Brigg, Yorkshire. Her crew were rescued. She was on a voyage from King's Lynn, Norfolk to Hartlepool, County Durham.
Diana	Spain	The brig was abandoned off Cape San Antonio, Cuba. She was on a voyage from Trinidad to Boston, Massachusetts, United States.
Eugenia	Portugal	The ship was run down and sunk off Start Point, Devon with the loss of all but her captain. She was on a voyage from São Miguel Island, Azores to London, United Kingdom.
Victor et Fèlice	France	The barque was driven ashore and wrecked in the Hooghly River at Kedgeree, India. She was on a voyage from Île Bourbon to Calcutta, India.

== 10 April ==
List of shipwrecks: 10 April 1838
Ship	State	Description
David Maurice	United Kingdom	The ship was wrecked on Castle Island, Bermuda. She was on a voyage from Jamaica to London.
Diamond	United Kingdom	The ship was driven ashore at Bolderāja, Russia. She was refloated on 13 May.
Union	United Kingdom	The paddle steamer was driven ashore at St Bees Head, Cumberland. She was later refloated.

== 11 April ==
List of shipwrecks: 11 April 1838
Ship	State	Description
Goodluck	United Kingdom	The ship was driven ashore and damaged at Marsala, Sicily, where she was under repair.
James	United Kingdom	The ship sank in the New Channel. Her crew were rescued. She was on a voyage from Mostyn, Flintshire to Dublin.

== 12 April ==
List of shipwrecks: 12 April 1838
Ship	State	Description
HMS Rapid	Royal Navy	The Cherokee-class brig-sloop was wrecked off Bona, Algeria with the loss of her captain.

== 13 April ==
List of shipwrecks: 13 April 1838
Ship	State	Description
Mary	United Kingdom	The brig struck the North Gar Sand, in the North Sea off the coast of County Durham. She was then driven ashore near the mouth of the River Tees and sank

== 14 April ==
List of shipwrecks: 14 April 1838
Ship	State	Description
Castor	United Kingdom	The brig was driven ashore at Troon, Ayrshire.

== 15 April ==
List of shipwrecks: 15 April 1838
Ship	State	Description
Le Roi	France	The barque was driven ashore near Southport, Lancashire, United Kingdom of Great Britain and Ireland. All on board were rescued. She was on a voyage from Liverpool, Lancashire to Nantes, Loire Atlantique. Le Roi was refloated on 24 April and taken into Liverpool.
Scotia	United Kingdom	The barque struck the Tenfeet Bank and sank off the Menai Lighthouse. All sixteen people on board were rescued by the Penmon Lifeboat. She was on a voyage from Liverpool to Demerara, British Guiana.
Sidonie	France	The ship was wrecked in the Authie. She was on a voyage from Martinique to Dunkirk, Nord.
Star	United Kingdom	The ship was driven ashore at Shoreham-by-Sea, Sussex. She was on a voyage from Sunderland, County Durham to Shoreham-by-Sea.

== 16 April ==
List of shipwrecks: 16 April 1838
Ship	State	Description
Choice	United Kingdom	The ship was driven ashore near Schiermonnikoog, Friesland, Netherlands. She was on a voyage from Sunderland, County Durham to Hamburg.
Diamond	United Kingdom	The brig was wrecked on the Barnard Sand, in the North Sea off the coast of Suffolk.
Frithiof	Norway	The ship was driven ashore and wrecked 8 nautical miles (15 km) east of Calais, France with the loss of all but two of her eleven or thirteen crew. She was on a voyage from Porsgrund to Nantes, Loire-Inférieure, France.
Hugh Taylor	United Kingdom	The ship ran aground in the Swine Bottoms, in the Baltic Sea off the coast of Denmark. She was refloated and put into Copenhagen for repairs.
Sophia	United Kingdom	The ship was driven ashore at Maryport, Cumberland. She was on a voyage from Carlisle to Whitehaven.
St Andrew	United Kingdom	The ship was driven ashore in the River Mersey. She was on a voyage from New York, United States to Liverpool, Lancashire. St Andrew was later refloated.
St. Vincent	United Kingdom	The ship was driven ashore in Loch Ryan. She was on a voyage from Glasgow, Renfrewshire to Saint Vincent, Virgin Islands.

== 17 April ==
List of shipwrecks: 17 April 1838
Ship	State	Description
Agnes	United Kingdom	The ship was driven ashore near Blainville-sur-Mer, Manche, France. Her crew were rescued. She was on a voyage from Whitehaven, Cumberland to Granville, Manche.
Athabaska	United Kingdom	The ship was wrecked on the West Hoyle Bank, in Liverpool Bay, with the loss of all 25 crew. She was on a voyage from Liverpool, Lancashire to Quebec City, Lower Canada, British North America.
Charles	United Kingdom	The brig was destroyed by fire in The Downs. All on board were rescued. She was on a voyage from London to Newfoundland, British North America.
Glenisla	United Kingdom	The ship was driven ashore at Portsall, Finistère, France. Her crew were rescued. She was on a voyage from London to the Cape of Good Hope. Glenisla had become a wreck by 26 April.
Nancy	United Kingdom	The ship foundered in the North Sea off Winterton-on-Sea, Norfolk with the loss of two of her three crew. She was on a voyage from Sunderland, County Durham to Great Yarmouth, Norfolk.
Neptune	United Kingdom	The East Indiaman was wrecked at Godreavy, Cornwall with the loss of all hands.
Scipio	United Kingdom	The ship was driven ashore at Ayr. She was on a voyage from Demerara to the Clyde. Scipio was refloated on 19 April and taken into Greenock, Renfrewshire.
Triton	United Kingdom	The barque was driven ashore and damaged at Rutland, Donegal. She was on a voyage from Hull, Yorkshire to Quebec City. Triton was refloated on 22 April and taken into "Inniscoo".

== 18 April ==
List of shipwrecks: 18 April 1838
Ship	State	Description
Black Dwarf	United Kingdom	The ship capsized and foundered in the Solway Firth off Carlisle, Cumberland. Her crew were rescued.
Britannia	United Kingdom	The ship was driven ashore in Silloth Bay. sHe was on a voyage from Carlisle, Cumberland to Restigouche, New Brunswick, British North America.
Oxford	United Kingdom	The ship was driven ashore in Loch Ryan. She was on a voyage from London to Saint Vincent, Virgin Islands.
Triton	United Kingdom	The ship was driven ashore in the Aran Islands, County Galway. She was on a voyage from Hull, Yorkshire to Quebec City, Lower Canada, British North America. Triton was refloated on 25 April and taken into Rutland, County Donegal.
Vine	United Kingdom	The ship was driven ashore at Grainthorpe, Lincolnshire.

== 19 April ==
List of shipwrecks: 19 April 1838
Ship	State	Description
Aurora	United Kingdom	The brig was wrecked at Montrose, Forfarshire. Her crew survived. She was on a voyage from Newcastle upon Tyne, Northumberland to Dublin.
Brunswick	United Kingdom	The schooner was damaged by fire at London.
Herald	United Kingdom	The barque was wrecked on the Mosquito Shoal, off the mouth of the River Roman, British Honduras, with the loss of three of her crew. She was on a voyage from Newcastle upon Tyne, Northumberland to British Honduras.

== 20 April ==
List of shipwrecks: 20 April 1838
Ship	State	Description
Exquisite	United Kingdom	The ship was driven ashore and sank at São Miguel Island, Azores.
Spencer	United Kingdom	The ship caught fire in the Bristol Channel off Cardiff, Glamorgan and was scuttled. She was on a voyage from Dublin to Cardiff.

== 21 April ==
List of shipwrecks: 21 April 1838
Ship	State	Description
Ariadne	United Kingdom	The ship was driven ashore near Crosby Point, Lancashire. She was on a voyage from Liverpool, Lancashire to Trieste. Ariadne was refloated the next day and resumed her voyage.
Carlton	United Kingdom	The ship was driven ashore near Crosby Point, Lancashire. She was on a voyage from Liverpool to Miramichi, New Brunswick, British North America. Carlton was refloated and put back to Liverpool.
Ewer Frue Catharine	Denmark	The ship was wrecked near "Helgens". Her crew were rescued. She was on a voyage from South Shields, County Durham, United Kingdom to Horsens.
Mersey	United Kingdom	The ship was scuttled in the Atlantic Ocean, having previously abandoned. She was on a voyage from Liverpool, Lancashire to Saint John, New Brunswick, British North America.
Susan and Ann	United Kingdom	The ship was driven ashore at Thisted, Denmark. Her crew were rescued. She was on a voyage from Ipswich, Suffolk to Lübeck.
Tommy	Ottoman Empire	The ship sprang a leak and was beached in Belgrave Bay, Guernsey, Channel Islands. She was on a voyage from Çeşme to Hamburg. Tommy was refloated and taken into Guernsey in a severely damaged condition.

== 22 April ==
List of shipwrecks: 22 April 1838
Ship	State	Description
Columbia	United Kingdom	The ship was driven ashore at Crosby Point, Lancashire. She was on a voyage from Liverpool, Lancashire to Barbados. Columbia was refloated and put back to Liverpool.
Ecce Homo	Spain	The ship was driven ashore at Santander.
Lady of the Isles	United Kingdom	The ship was driven ashore and damaged at Santander. Her crew were rescued. She was on a voyage from London to Bilbao, Spain. Lady of the Isles was refloated with assistance from HMS Savage (Royal Navy).
Maria de la Gloria	UKGBI	The ship was driven ashore at Santander.
Ruby	United Kingdom	The barque foundered at 5°43′S 64°40′E on a voyage from Macao, China, to Bombay, India. The crew took to her boats and survived.

== 23 April ==
List of shipwrecks: 23 April 1838
Ship	State	Description
Margaretta Elizabeth	Hamburg	The ship ran aground on the Bondicar Rocks, Northumberland, United Kingdom. She was on a voyage from Altona to the Firth of Tay. Margaretta Elizabeth was refloated and put into Warkworth, Northumberland.
Madonna della Gracia	Kingdom of Naples	The ship was driven ashore and wrecked near Hjørring, Denmark. Her crew were rescued. She was on a voyage from Saint Petersburg, Russia to Naples.

== 24 April ==
List of shipwrecks: 24 April 1838
Ship	State	Description
Choice	United Kingdom	The ship ran aground on the Gunfleet Sand, in the North Sea off the coast of Essex and was damaged. She was on a voyage from London to Riga, Russia. Choice was refloated and taken into Harwich, Essex.
Gem	United Kingdom	The ship ran aground on the Gunfleet Sand and was damaged. She was on a voyage from London to Sunderland, County Durham. Gem was refloated and taken into Harwich.
Lena	Stralsund	The ship was driven ashore on Rügen, Prussia. She was on a voyage from Stralsund to Great Yarmouth, Norfolk, United Kingdom. Lena was later refloated and taken into Griefswald in a leaky condition.
Pauline	United Kingdom	The ship ran aground in the New Channel. She was on a voyage from Liverpool, Lancashire to Ostend, West Flanders, Belgium.
Virgine della Grazia	Flag unknown	The ship was wrecked near Thisted, Denmark. Her crew were rescued.

== 25 April ==
List of shipwrecks: 25 April 1838
Ship	State	Description
Ark	United Kingdom	The ship ran aground on the Lemon and Ore Sand, in the North Sea off the coast of Essex and was damaged. She was refloated and assisted into Harwich, Essex by HMRC Badger ( Board of Customs). Ark was on a voyage from Stockton-on-Tees, County Durham to Maldon, Essex.
Castlereagh	United Kingdom	The brig ran aground on the Haisborough Sands, in the North Sea off the coast of Norfolk and was abandoned by her crew, with the exception of her captain, off Winterton-on-Sea. She subsequently came ashore at Mundesley and was wrecked. Her captain survived, the crew arrived at Great Yarmouth.
Iroquois	United Kingdom	The ship ran aground on the Haisborough Sands and was damaged. She put into Great Yarmouth in a leaky condition.
John	United Kingdom	The ship was driven ashore 1 league(3 nautical miles (5.6 km)) east of Calais, France. She was on a voyage from Newcastle upon Tyne, Northumberland to Portsmouth, Hampshire.
Moselle	United States	The steamboat suffered a boiler explosion at Fulton, Ohio, and was destroyed with the loss of about 160 lives.
Pauline	Belgium	The ship ran aground in the New Channel. She was on a voyage from Liverpool, Lancashire, United Kingdom to Ostend, West Flanders
Wennerne	Norway	The ship was driven ashore in Druridge Bay. She was on a voyage from Dram to Sunderland, County Durham, United Kingdom.

== 26 April ==
List of shipwrecks: 26 April 1838
Ship	State	Description
Ardwell	United Kingdom	The ship ran aground in the River Nene 4 nautical miles (7.4 km) from King's Lynn, Norfolk. She was refloated on 28 April.
Commerce	United Kingdom	The ship was driven ashore and wrecked 10 nautical miles (19 km) south of Bridlington, Yorkshire.
Diamond	United Kingdom	The ship was wrecked on the Cross Sand, in the North Sea. Her crew were rescued. she was on a voyage from Seaham, County Durham to London.
Isabella	United Kingdom	The ship capsized at Dublin.
Victorine	France	The ship was driven ashore at Varaville, Calvados. All on board were rescued. She was on a voyage from Portsmouth, Hampshire, United Kingdom to Cherbourg, Seine-Inférieure.

== 27 April ==
List of shipwrecks: 27 April 1838
Ship	State	Description
James Hunt	United Kingdom	The brig capsized at Falmouth, Cornwall. She was on a voyage from Saint Domingo to Antwerp, Belgium.

== 28 April ==
List of shipwrecks: 28 April 1838
Ship	State	Description
Champion	United Kingdom	The schooner sprang a leak in the North Sea. She was beached at Bridlington, Yorkshire, where she sank. Champion was on a voyage from Sunderland, County Durham to Great Yarmouth, Norfolk. She was later raised and taken into Bridlington.
Fried	Prussia	The ship was sunk by ice off Helsingør, Denmark.

== 29 April ==
List of shipwrecks: 29 April 1838
Ship	State	Description
Alexandria	France	The ship was driven ashore at the mouth of the River Adur. She was on a voyage from Newcastle upon Tyne, Northumberland, United Kingdom to Bayonne, Basses-Pyrénées.

== 30 April ==
List of shipwrecks: 30 April 1838
Ship	State	Description
Ann Williams	United Kingdom	The ship was wrecked on the Banjaard Sand, in the North Sea off the coast of Zeeland, Netherlands. Her crew were rescued. She was on a voyage from Newport, Monmouthshire to Dordrecht, South Holland, Netherlands.
Diana	United Kingdom	The ship was wrecked on the Barnard Sand, in the North Sea off the coast of Suffolk with the loss of all hands.
Dove, and Hope	United Kingdom	The schooner Dove was in collision with the sloop Hope off Winterton-on-Sea, Norfolk. Both vessels sank. Dove's crew were rescued by Hannah (United Kingdom). Hope's crew were rescued by a Humber Keel. Hope was on a voyage from Goole, Yorkshire to London.

== Unknown date ==
List of shipwrecks: Unknown date in April 1838
Ship	State	Description
Canada	United Kingdom	The ship foundered in the Atlantic Ocean before 14 April.
Carlton	United Kingdom	The ship was driven ashore near Crosby Point, Lancashire. She was on a voyage from Liverpool, Lancashire to Miramichi, New Brunswick, British North America.
Charlotte Dorothea	Stettin	The ship was sunk by ice off Rügen, Prussia. She was on a voyage from Stettin to King's Lynn, Norfolk, United Kingdom.
Dart	(United Kingdom of Great Britain and Ireland) New South Wales	The ship was wrecked on Troubridge Island, South Australia. Her crew were rescued.
Fortuin	Netherlands	The ship was abandoned in the North Sea before 19 April.
Fortuna	Norway	The ship was abandoned in the North Sea before 18 April.
Gute Hoffnung	Bremen	The ship was abandoned in the North Sea before 1 May. She was on a voyage from Wick, Caithness, United Kingdom to Bremen.Gute Hoffnung was taken into Peterhead, Aberdeenshire, United Kingdom on 1 May.
Julie	Norway	The ship foundered in the North Sea with the loss of all but two of her crew.
Lowestoft	(United Kingdom of Great Britain and Ireland) New South Wales	The schooner ran aground at Port Adelaide, South Australia. She was on a voyage from Launceston, Van Diemen's Land to Port Adelaide.
Medora	United Kingdom	The ship foundered in the North Sea off the coast of Yorkshire before 9 April.
Mungo	(United Kingdom of Great Britain and Ireland) British North America	The ship was abandoned in the Atlantic Ocean before 3 April.
Resolution	Norway	The ship foundered in the North Sea with the loss of two of her crew. Survivors were rescued by Hero (United Kingdom). Resolution was on a voyage from Christiania to London, United Kingdom.
San José	United Kingdom	The ship ran aground on the Goodwin Sands, Kent, United Kingdom. She was on a voyage from Porto to Amsterdam, North Holland, Netherlands. San José was refloated and taken into Ramsgate, Kent.
Spencer	United Kingdom	The ship capsized in the Atlantic Ocean off the Isles of Scilly before 18 April.
Two Brothers and Sisters	United Kingdom	The ship was abandoned in the Atlantic Ocean before 25 April.
