= AC2 =

AC2 may refer to:

== In video gaming ==
- Ace Combat 2
- Armored Core 2
- Asheron's Call 2
- Assassin's Creed II

== Other uses ==
- AC2, a ranking grading within the Royal Air Force between 1919 and 1964
- AC-2, a submarine telecommunications cable system
- AC-2 Buffalo, a transport aircraft
- AC2: Combat Shield and Mini-adventure, an accessory for Dungeons & Dragons
- Southern Pacific class AC-2, a class of steam locomotives
- TRAXX F140 AC2, a locomotive
- AC2 Treated lumber
