= 9th Independent Battery Indiana Light Artillery =

- Active: December 20, 1861 – June 25, 1865
- Country: United States
- Allegiance: Union
- Branch: Artillery
- Equipment: 4 6-pdr smoothbores, 2 12-pdr Howitzers
- Engagements: Battle of Shiloh; Siege of Corinth; Red River Campaign; Battle of Pleasant Hill; Battle of Westport; Battle of Nashville

9th Indiana Battery Light Artillery was an artillery battery that served in the Union Army during the American Civil War.

== Service ==
The battery was organized at Indianapolis, Indiana and mustered in on December 20, 1861, for a three years service.

The battery was attached to Military District of Cairo to April 1862. Artillery, 3rd Division, Army of the Tennessee, to July 1862. Artillery, 1st Division, District of Jackson, Tennessee, to September 1862. Artillery, 4th Division, District of Jackson to November 1862. Artillery, 4th Division, District of Jackson, Right Wing, XIII Corps, Department of the Tennessee, to December 1862. Artillery, 4th Division, XVII Corps, to January 1863. Artillery, 4th Division, XVI Corps, to March 1863. Artillery, District of Columbus, Kentucky, 6th Division, XVI Corps, to July 1863. 1st Brigade, District of Columbus, 6th Division, XVI Corps, to January 1864. Artillery, 3rd Division, XVI Corps, to December 1864. 1st Brigade, 2nd Division (detachment), Army of the Tennessee, Department of the Cumberland, to January 1865.

The 9th Indiana Battery Light Artillery's non-veterans mustered out March 6, 1865; the remaining men mustered out of service June 25, 1865.

== Detailed service ==
Duty at Indianapolis, until January 27, 1862. Moved to Cairo, Illinois, January 27, and duty there until March 27. Remustered February 25, 1862. Moved to Pittsburg Landing, Tennessee, March 27, 1862. Battle of Shiloh, April 6–7. Advance on and siege of Corinth, Mississippi, April 29-May 30. Moved to Bolivar, Tennessee, and duty there until November 1862. Action at Bolivar August 30. Grant's Central Mississippi Campaign November 1862 to January 1863. Duty at Tallahatchie River December 24, 1862 to January 20, 1863. Moved to Colliersville, Tennessee, then to Memphis, Tennessee, and to Columbus, Kentucky, March 1863. Duty there until July 10. Expedition to Cape Girardeau April 29-May 4. Moved to Clinton, Kentucky, July 10. Campaign against Roddy's forces July 15-August 4. Duty at Union City, Tennessee, August 4, 1863, to January 23, 1864. Pursuit of Forrest December 20–26, 1863. Ordered to Vicksburg, Mississippi, January 23. Meridian Campaign February 3-March 2. Red River Campaign March 10-May 22. Fort DeRussy March 14. Occupation of Alexandria March 16. Henderson's Hill March 21. Battle of Pleasant Hill April 9. About Cloutiersville April 22–24. Alexandria April 30-May 13. Bayou LaMourie May 6–7. Retreat to Morganza May 13–20. Avoyelle's Prairie, Marksville, May 16. Yellow Bayou May 18. Moved to Vicksburg, Mississippi, May 19–24; then to Memphis, Tennessee, May 25-June 10. Lake Chicot, Arkansas, June 6–7. Smith's Expedition to Tupelo, Mississippi, July 5–21 (non-veterans). Harrisburg, near Tupelo, July 14–15. Old Town (or Tishamingo Creek) July 15. Smith's Expedition to Oxford, Mississippi, October 1–30. Moved to Jefferson Barracks, Missouri, September 8–19. Expedition to DeSoto September 20-October 1. Marched through Missouri in pursuit of Price October 2-November 19. Moved to Nashville, Tennessee, November 25-December 1. Battles of Nashville December 15–16. Pursuit of Hood to the Tennessee River December 17–28. Ordered to Indiana January 25, 1865; blown up on steamer Eclypse (shown as "Eclipse" in Indiana Roll of Honor) at Johnsonville January 27, 1865, and out of 70 officers and men, only 10 escaped unhurt. Veterans and recruits on duty at Camp Butler, Springfield, Illinois, until June.

== Casualties ==
The battery lost a total of 61 men during service; 6 enlisted men killed or mortally wounded, 55 enlisted men died of disease.

== Commanders ==
- Lieutenant George R. Brown - commanded at the battle of Shiloh
- Lieutenant Samuel G. Calfee - commanded at the battle of Nashville

== See also ==
- List of Indiana Civil War regiments
- Indiana in the Civil War
