= Eclipse (steamboat) =

U.S. troop transport exploded 1865

The Eclipse was a river steamboat of the United States. Her boilers exploded on the Tennessee River at Johnsonville, near Paducah, Kentucky, on January 27, 1865, resulting in 38 killed. The deaths and severe injuries resulting from the explosion essentially wiped out a U.S. Army unit, the 9th Independent Battery Indiana Light Artillery.

There were at least 13 American steamboats that were called Eclipse.

== See also ==
- Sultana (steamboat)
- List of boiler explosions
- 1865 in the United States
