= James McConnell (engineer) =

British railway engineer (1815–1883)

James Edward McConnell
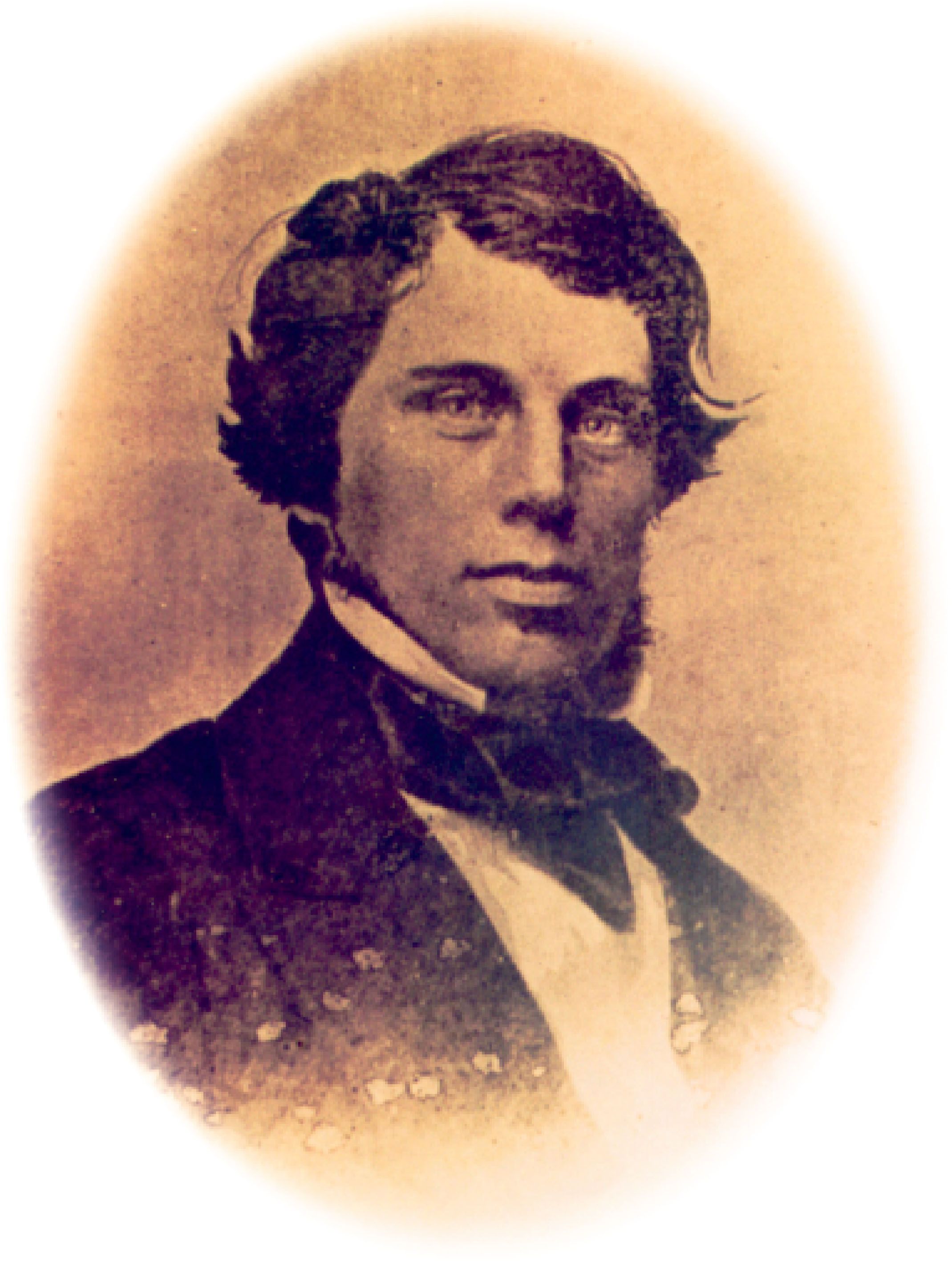
- Born: 1 January 1815; Fermoy, Ireland
- Died: 11 June 1883 (aged 68); Great Missenden, England
- Engineering career
- Discipline: Locomotive engineer
- Employer(s): Birmingham and Gloucester Railway; London and North Western Railway

James Edward McConnell (1815–1883) was one of the first locomotive engineers of the London and North Western Railway (LNWR). He was Locomotive Superintendent of the LNWR's Southern Division at Wolverton railway works from 1847 to 1862 and oversaw the design of the "Bloomer" and "Patent" locomotives. He was also one of the founding members of the Institution of Mechanical Engineers, and its first chairman, discussing the issue of an institute in 1846 at Bromsgrove.

== Biography ==
McConnell was born at Fermoy, County Cork, Ireland, on 1 January 1815.

In July 1841 McConnell joined the Birmingham and Gloucester Railway as foreman of locomotives.

Since the Rainhill Trials in 1829, it had been accepted that the smoke emitted by burning coal was a nuisance. Railway companies accepted the need to burn coke (a smokeless fuel) in their locomotives, but this was much more expensive than coal, and several locomotive engineers sought a method by which coal could be burned smokelessly. One such engineer was McConnell, who designed a boiler suitable for coal in 1852.

McConnell died at Great Missenden, Buckinghamshire, England, on 11 June 1883.

== See also ==
- Locomotives of the London and North Western Railway

== Sources ==
- Ahrons, E.L. (1987) [1927]. The British Steam Railway Locomotive 1825–1925. London: Bracken Books. ISBN 1-85170-103-6.
- Ian Allan ABC of British Railways Locomotives, January 1961, part 3, page 58
- Awdry, Rev W (1981). "Bromsgrove and the Lickey Incline: the railway revolution". In Foster, John (ed.). Bygone Bromsgrove: an illustrated story of the town in days gone by. Bromsgrove Society. ISBN 9780950947143. OL 19606374M.
- Jack, Harry (2001): Locomotives of the LNWR Southern Division – London & Birmingham Railway and Wolverton Locomotive Works. Sawtry, RCTS. ISBN 0-901115-89-4
- Long, P. J.; Awdry, W. V. (1987). The Birmingham and Gloucester Railway. Gloucester: Alan Sutton. ISBN 0862993296. OCLC 18588406. OL 2468738M.
- Marshall, John (1978). A Biographical Dictionary of Railway Engineers. Newton Abbot: David & Charles. ISBN 0-7153-7489-3.
- Watson, Garth (1988). The civils: the story of the Institution of Civil Engineers. Thomas Telford Limited. ISBN 978-0727703927.
- "Obituary James Edward Mcconnell, 1815-1883". Minutes of the Proceedings of the Institution of Civil Engineers. 74 (1883): 285–286. 1883. doi:10.1680/imotp.1883.21742.
- Glossary for the LNWR Society
- James Edward McConnell at steamindex.com
