= Southern Pacific class MC-4 =

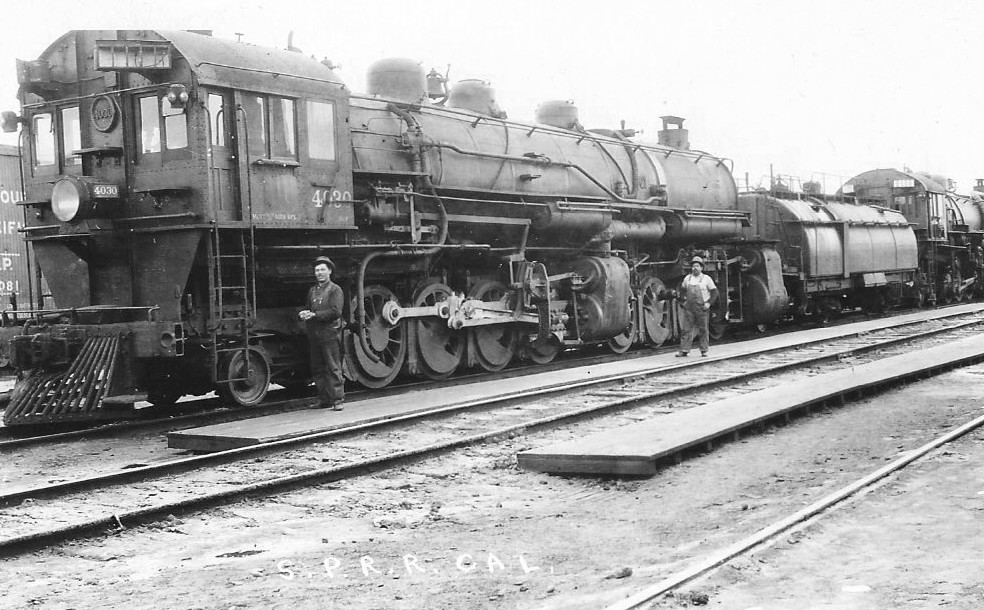
Type and origin
- Power type: Steam
- Builder: Baldwin Locomotive Works
- Serial number: 36490-36493, 36524-36527, 36614-36616, 36634
- Build date: April–May 1911
Specifications
- Configuration
  - Whyte: 2-8-8-2
- Gauge: 4 ft 8 1/2 in (1,435 mm) standard gauge
- Driver dia.: 57 in (1,448 mm)
- Adhesive weight: 398,500 lb (180,800 kg)
- Loco weight: 432,600 lb (196,200 kg)
- Boiler pressure: 200 psi (1.4 MPa)
- High-pressure cylinder: 26 in × 30 in (660 mm × 762 mm)
- Low-pressure cylinder: 40 in × 30 in (1,016 mm × 762 mm)
Performance figures
- Tractive effort: 85,040 lbf (378.28 kN)
Career
- Operators: Southern Pacific Railroad
- Class: MC-4
- Numbers: 4017 – 4028
- First run: July 21, 1911
- Retired: 1947 – 1948
- Disposition: scrapped

Southern Pacific Railroad's MC-4 class of steam locomotive was the second class ordered and built as cab forward locomotives. Southern Pacific (SP) found the MC-2 class sufficient for a proof-of-concept for cab forward locomotives and sought to continue with now tested designs.

In service, SP found that the locomotives were a little too slow for the traffic needs. By 1930, all of the MC-4 class had been "simpled" to use uniform size cylinders and feedwater heaters were installed to address the issue. They were then reclassified as AC-2 locomotives. As rebuilt, the locomotives continued in service through the end of World War II.
