= New York Telephone Company building explosion =

1962 disaster

- Date: October 3, 1962
- Location: Broadway & West 213th Street, Upper Manhattan, New York City; 40°52′8″N 73°55′0″W
- Type: Boiler explosion
- Deaths: 23
- Injuries: 94

On October 3, 1962, a boiler exploded in a New York Telephone Company building in Upper Manhattan, killing 23 people and injuring 94.
