= LNWR Bloomer Class =

Class of 74 2-2-2 passenger locomotives

LNWR "Bloomer" Class
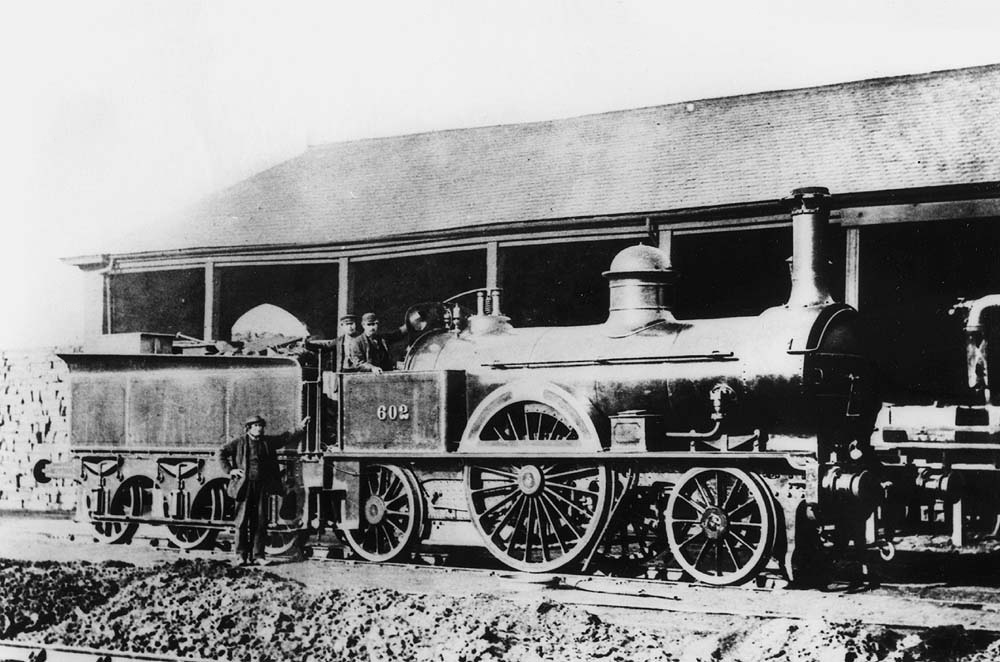
- No.602 (Small Bloomer class), c.1868
Type and origin
- Power type: Steam
- Designer: James McConnell
- Builder: (a.): Sharp, Stewart & Co. (25); Kitson & Co. (5); Wolverton Works (10) (b.): R and W Hawthorn (7); Vulcan Foundry (4); Wolverton Works (20) (c.): Wolverton Works (3)
- Build date: 1851–1862
- Total produced: (a.): 40 (b): 31 (c): 3
Specifications
- Configuration
  - Whyte: 2-2-2
  - UIC: 1A1
- Gauge: 4 ft 8 1/2 in (1,435 mm)
- Leading dia.: (a.): 4 ft 6 in (1.372 m) (b.): 4 ft 0 in (1.219 m) (c.): 4 ft 6 in (1.372 m)
- Driver dia.: (a.): 7 ft 0 in (2.134 m) (b.): 6 ft 6 in (1.981 m) (c.): 7 ft 6 in (2.286 m)
- Trailing dia.: (a.) & (b.): 4 ft 0 in (1.219 m) (c.): 4 ft 6 in (1.372 m)
- Loco weight: (a.): 29.5 long tons (30.0 t); (b.): 23.65 long tons (24.03 t); (c.): 34.75 long tons (35.31 t)
- Boiler pressure: 100 psi (0.69 MPa) later increased to 150 psi (1.03 MPa)
- Heating surface: (a.): 1,448.5 sq ft (134.57 m^{2}) (b.): 1,230 sq ft (114 m^{2}) (c.): 1,222.8 sq ft (113.60 m^{2})
- Cylinders: Two, inside
- Cylinder size: (a.): 16 in × 22 in (406 mm × 559 mm); (b.): 16 in × 21 in (406 mm × 533 mm); (c.): 18 in × 24 in (457 mm × 610 mm)
- Valve gear: Stephenson
Performance figures
- Tractive effort: various between 5,700 lbf (25 kN) and 11,016 lbf (49.00 kN)
Career
- Operators: LNWR Southern Division
- Withdrawn: 1876–1888
- Disposition: Original locomotives withdrawn and scrapped between 1876 and 1888. Full-size replica for static display completed 1991. Full-size working engine under construction

Bloomer was a name used to refer to three similar classes of 2-2-2 express passenger locomotives designed by James McConnell for the Southern Division of the London and North Western Railway (LNWR). A total of seventy-four were built between 1851 and 1862. The classes were similar in design and layout but differed in dimensions.

== History ==
The name "Bloomer" was at first a nickname, but was quickly adopted officially. The nickname was a topical one in the autumn of 1851 when the first engine arrived on the line, because of the current popular excitement aroused by the appearance of women wearing trousers, as advocated by Mrs Amelia Bloomer. The widespread belief that they were nicknamed so because they showed more of their wheels than earlier engines is unsubstantiated as most earlier engines on the line had exposed drivers.

Another myth is that until 1862 the Bloomers (and other Southern Division engines) were painted vermilion. They were not, although some were painted a very dark plum-red from 1861, before the standard livery reverted to green in the following year, and then changed to black from 1873.

In April 1862, the Southern Division locomotives were renumbered into the all-LNWR series by the addition of 600 to each engine's number.

Apart from two of the 6 ft 6 in engines which were scrapped in 1866, all the Bloomers were given nameplates in 1872; the names awarded were of the usual miscellaneous variety customary on the LNWR.

=== (a) 7 ft driving wheel Bloomers ('Large Bloomers' from 1862) ===
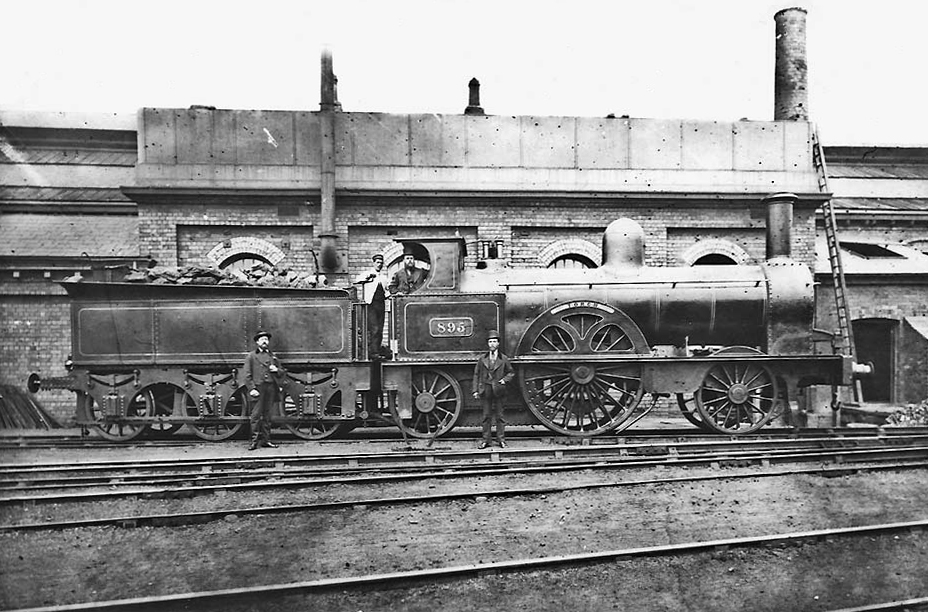
Large Bloomer No. 895 Torch at Monument Lane shed in 1877

The design of these was derived from six successful 2-2-2 locomotives supplied to the railway by Bury, Curtis and Kennedy in 1848. McConnell substituted plate frames, provided larger boilers and 7 ft 0 in (2.134 m) driving wheels. The first twenty were built by Sharp, Stewart and Company in 1851–1853. A further twenty examples were built in 1861/2: five by Sharp Stewart & Co., five by Kitson and Company, and ten at the Wolverton railway works of the LNWR.

They were numbered 247–256, 287–296 and 389–408 until 1862, when they were renumbered by the addition of 600, becoming 847 to 1008.

The locomotives were primarily used on express passenger services between London and Birmingham and, from 1860, also from Rugby to Stafford.

During the 1860s and 1870s, most of the class were rebuilt with new (Crewe) boilers; the original 2,000 imp gal (9,100 L; 2,400 US gal) tenders were reduced to hold 1,700 imp gal (7,700 L; 2,000 US gal) after the introduction of water troughs on the main line. Withdrawals took place between June 1876 and November 1888.

Table of locomotives
1854 Southern Division No.	Maker	Serial number	Date built	1862 LNWR No.	1872 name	Date scrapped	Notes
247	Sharp Brothers	677	Aug 1851	847	Odin	Dec 1878	
248	Sharp Brothers	678	Sep 1851	848	Hecate	Oct 1883	
249	Sharp Brothers	679	Sep 1851	849	Aeolus	Dec 1879	Involved in Atherstone collision of 16 Nov 1860 and Easenhall bridge boiler explosion of 4 July 1861
250	Sharp Brothers	680	Sep 1851	850	Columbine	Nov 1881	Involved in Harrow collision of 26 Nov 1870
251	Sharp Brothers	681	Oct 1851	851	Apollo	Mar 1881	
252	Sharp Brothers	682	Oct 1851	852	Basilisk	Sep 1879	
253	Sharp Brothers	683	Nov 1851	853	Vulture	Jan 1877	
254	Sharp Brothers	684	Nov 1851	854	Dalemain	Dec 1877	
255	Sharp Brothers	685	Dec 1851	855	Sandon	Dec 1877	
256	Sharp Brothers	686	Dec 1851	856	Ingestre	June 1876	
287	Sharp Brothers	700	Oct 1852	887	Knowsley	May 1882	
288	Sharp Brothers	701	Oct 1852	888	Hydra	Apr 1882	
289	Sharp Brothers	702	Nov 1852	889	Camilla	Feb 1884	
290	Sharp Brothers	703	Nov 1852	890	Helvellyn	Mar 1877	
291	Sharp Brothers	704	Nov 1852	891	Duke	Apr 1883	
292	Sharp Brothers	705	Dec 1852	892	Polyphemus	Sep 1877	
293	Sharp Brothers	710	Dec 1852	893	Harpy	Mar 1885	Renumbered 1817 in Dec 1884
294	Sharp Brothers	712	Feb 1853	894	Trentham	Apr 1883	
295	Sharp Brothers	713	Feb 1853	895	Torch	Mar 1887	Renumbered 1828 in Dec 1884 and 3050 in Nov 1886
296	Sharp Brothers	715	Feb 1853	896	Daedalus	July 1877	
399	Sharp, Stewart	1289	Oct 1861	999	Medusa	Sep 1887	Renumbered 1898 in Dec 1884
400	Sharp, Stewart	1290	Oct 1861	1000	Umpire	Mar 1885	Renumbered 1902 in Dec 1884
401	Sharp, Stewart	1291	Nov 1861	1001	Leviathan	Dec 1884	
402	Sharp, Stewart	1292	Nov 1861	1002	Theseus	June 1882	
403	Sharp, Stewart	1293	Nov 1861	1003	Tamerlane	May 1886	Renumbered 1905 in Dec 1884
404	Kitson & Co.	899	Sep 1861	1004	Lucifer	July 1883	
405	Kitson & Co.	900	Sep 1861	1005	Achilles	Oct 1884	
406	Kitson & Co.	901	Oct 1861	1006	Proserpine	Oct 1876	
407	Kitson & Co.	902	Oct 1861	1007	President	Dec 1877	
408	Kitson & Co.	903	Oct 1861	1008	Rowland Hill	Feb 1885	Renumbered 1907 in Dec 1884
389	Wolverton Works	—	Mar 1862	989	Archimedes	Sep 1887	Renumbered 1853 in Dec 1884 and 3071 in Nov 1886
390	Wolverton Works	—	Mar 1862	990	Alaric	June 1886	Renumbered 1881 in Dec 1884
391	Wolverton Works	—	Mar 1862	991	Japan	Jan 1882	
392	Wolverton Works	—	Mar 1862	992	Stork	Nov 1888	Renumbered 1882 in Dec 1884 and 3023 in May 1887
393 *	Wolverton Works	—	Apr 1862	993	Burmah	Feb 1881	
394 *	Wolverton Works	—	Apr 1862	994	Ariel	Sep 1884	
395 *	Wolverton Works	—	Apr 1862	995	Briareus	Sep 1879	
396 *	Wolverton Works	—	May 1862	996	Raglan	June 1882	
397 *	Wolverton Works	—	Apr 1862	997	Baronet	Jan 1882	
398 *	Wolverton Works	—	May 1862	998	Una	June 1885	Renumbered 1897 in Dec 1884

* Number assigned, but possibly never carried

=== (b) 6 ft 6 in driving wheels ('Small Bloomers') ===
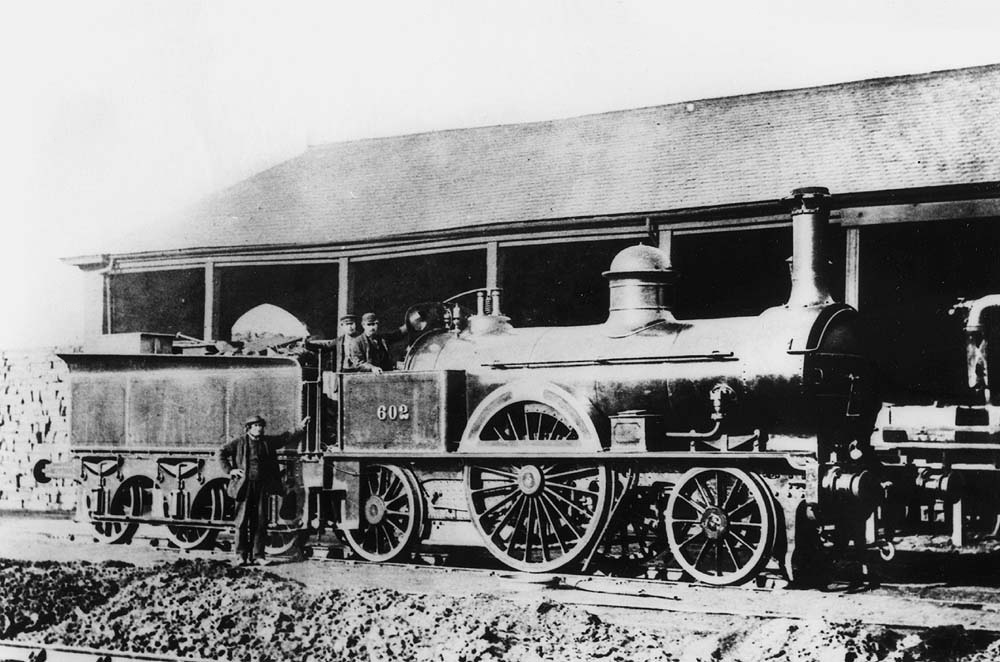
Small Bloomer No. 602 at Rugby c. 1868

Eleven smaller examples were built with 6 ft 6 in (1.981 m) driving wheels in 1854 for use on secondary fast main-line trains and branch lines of the Southern Division. These engines were originally intended by McConnell to be a 7 ft-wheel variant of his Patent class, but the design was altered by order of the directors to a smaller version of the successful Bloomers. Like them, the design was closely based on the Bury, Curtis & Kennedy 6 ft single of 1848; McConnell called the Small Bloomer design 'Bury's Improved'.

Seven were built by R and W Hawthorn and four by Vulcan Foundry. A further twenty of this design were built at Wolverton Works between 1857 and 1861. Numbers originally carried were an assortment from 2 to 381, renumbered 602 to 981 in 1862. Two were withdrawn in 1866, but the others were rebuilt between 1868 and 1876; the last one was scrapped in 1887.

Table of locomotives
1854 Southern Division No.	1856 Southern Division No.	Maker	Serial number	Date built	1862 LNWR No.	1872 name	Date scrapped	Notes
310	13	Vulcan Foundry	358	June 1854	613	—	Dec 1866	
311	14	Vulcan Foundry	359	June 1854	614	Wyre	Feb 1879	
312	15	Vulcan Foundry	360	July 1854	615	Lune	Feb 1883	
313	17	Vulcan Foundry	361	July 1854	617	Partridge	June 1883	
314	23	R. & W. Hawthorn	842	Apr 1854	623	Medea	Dec 1877	
315	24	R. & W. Hawthorn	843	Apr 1854	624	—	Dec 1866	
316	25	R. & W. Hawthorn	844	May 1854	625	Mastodon	July 1878	
317	26	R. & W. Hawthorn	845	June 1854	626	Earl	May 1879	
318	27	R. & W. Hawthorn	846	June 1854	627	Bulldog	Aug 1881	
319	29	R. & W. Hawthorn	847	June 1854	629	Swan	Jan 1883	
320	30	R. & W. Hawthorn	865	July 1854	630	Ribble	Feb 1882	
—	7	Wolverton Works	—	Aug 1857	607	Inglewood	Feb 1883	
—	21	Wolverton Works	—	July 1857	621	Bela	Feb 1882	
—	103	Wolverton Works	—	May 1857	703	Osprey	Sep 1881	
—	140	Wolverton Works	—	Aug 1857	740	St. David	Nov 1886	Renumbered 1947 in Nov 1884
—	238	Wolverton Works	—	Oct 1857	838	Petrel	Mar 1879	
—	240	Wolverton Works	—	1857	840	Lonsdale	Mar 1878	
—	2	Wolverton Works	—	July 1858	602	Caliban	Aug 1881	
—	165	Wolverton Works	—	Oct 1858	765	Herald	Mar 1885	Renumbered 1952 in Nov 1884
—	168	Wolverton Works	—	Feb 1858	768	Glyn	Mar 1884	
—	180	Wolverton Works	—	Dec 1858	780	Bucephalus	Aug 1883	
—	3	Wolverton Works	—	Oct 1859	603	Langdale	Dec 1884	Renumbered 1941 in Nov 1884
—	66	Wolverton Works	—	Aug 1859	666	Pheasant	Dec 1877	
—	117	Wolverton Works	—	May 1859	717	Swift	Sep 1882	
—	189	Wolverton Works	—	July 1859	789	Cadmus	Dec 1880	
—	317	Wolverton Works	—	Jan 1860	917	Napier	June 1880	
—	377	Wolverton Works	—	Sep 1861	977	Sultan	Feb 1887	Renumbered 1954 in Nov 1884
—	378	Wolverton Works	—	Oct 1861	978	Mammoth	Feb 1885	Renumbered 1957 in Nov 1884
—	379	Wolverton Works	—	Oct 1861	979	Wasp	June 1880	
—	380	Wolverton Works	—	Nov 1861	980	Vandal	Mar 1887	Renumbered 1816 in Dec 1884 and 3038 in Nov 1886
—	381	Wolverton Works	—	Nov 1861	981	Councillor	Jan 1884	Renumbered 1925 in Dec 1883

=== (c) 7 ft 6 in driving wheel (H-class 'Special Bloomers') ===
Three examples were built by Wolverton Works with 7 ft 6 in (2.286 m) driving wheels together with McConnell’s patented firebox in 1861, which were intended for the fastest expresses. They were heavier than had been planned, so a further two engines, ordered and under construction, were cancelled in February 1862. This led to McConnell’s immediate resignation. The three completed engines (Nos. 372/3/5) went into store, so hardly ran in their original state. One of them (No. 373) was put on show at the 1862 International Exhibition in South Kensington from May to November 1862.

After rebuilding with normal boilers in 1866/7, they worked until withdrawal in 1880 and 1882. Many years later, they were described as "Extra-large Bloomers".

Table of locomotives
Southern Division No.	Date built	1862 LNWR No.	1865 Duplicate No.	1871 Capital No.	1872 Name	1879 Duplicate No.	Date scrapped
372	Aug 1861	972	1152	1198	Delamere	1940	Jan 1880
373	Nov 1861	973	1155	1199	Caithness	1885	Mar 1882
375	May 1861	975	1166	1200	Maberley	1871	Mar 1882

== Replicas ==
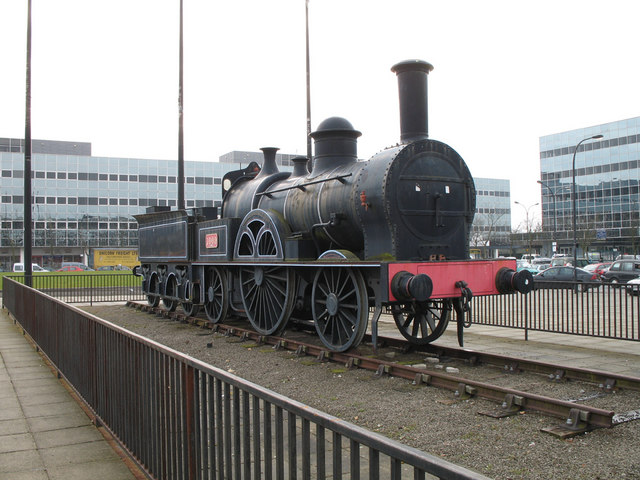
Replica No. 1009 on a plinth outside Milton Keynes Central Station

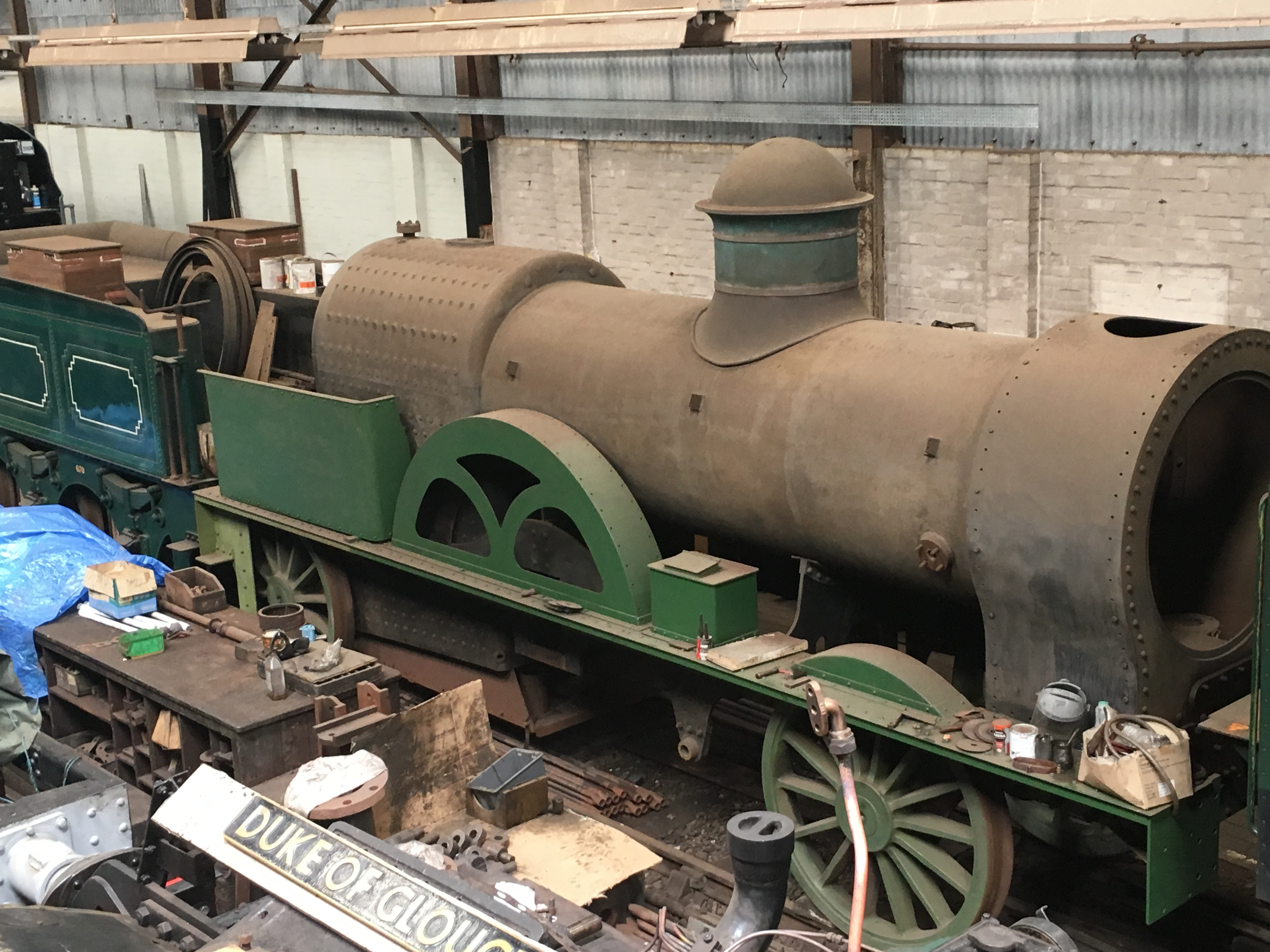
LNWR Bloomer No. 670 at Tyseley

An accurate full-size, non-working replica was built, by apprentices, for static display outside Milton Keynes station in 1991. It represented the type as in 1873–76 condition, was numbered '1009' as if to follow the last of the class, 1008, and was named 'Wolverton' to commemorate the Southern Division Works, although no engine was so named on the LNWR. It was taken into Wolverton Works (then owned by Alstom and later by Railcare) in 2006 for renovation and repainting. The renovation was funded and carried out by the various owners of Wolverton works and latterly by Knorr-Bremse RailServices at Wolverton Works. The Wolverton and Greenleys Town Council and the Wolverton Arts and Heritage Society wanted the replica to have a position on Stratford road outside the Railway works but this was not viable and led to much delay in the re-siting the model. On 3 March 2017, the replica was moved to its new home at Milton Keynes Museum.

A full-size working engine as in original Southern Division condition (pre-1862) was begun at Tyseley in 1986 and was 90% completed by 1990. It has never been finished; however, the LNWR Bloomer project was launched in June 2019 in order to complete the locomotive.
