= Southern Pacific class AC-2 =

Type and origin
- Power type: Steam
Specifications
- Configuration
  - Whyte: 2-8-8-2
- Gauge: 4 ft 8 1/2 in (1,435 mm) standard gauge
- Driver dia.: 57 in (1,448 mm)
- Adhesive weight: 440,800 lb (199,900 kg)
- Loco weight: 481,200 lb (218,300 kg)
- Boiler pressure: 210 psi (1,400 kPa)
- Feedwater heater: 4 1/4-BL Worthington
- Cylinder size: 22 in × 30 in (559 mm × 762 mm) dia × stroke
Performance figures
- Tractive effort: 90,940 lbf (404.5 kN)
Career
- Operators: Southern Pacific Railroad
- Class: AC-2
- Number in class: 12
- Numbers: 4017 - 4028
- Retired: 1947 - 1948
- Disposition: scrapped

Southern Pacific Railroad's AC-2 class of steam locomotives was the second in the AC series of cab forward locomotives built for Southern Pacific (SP). This class consisted of locomotives that were rebuilt from Baldwin-built SP MC-4 class locomotives by 1930.

The rebuild from MC-4 class gained the locomotives about 5,000 pounds-force (22 kN) in tractive effort, but also increased the locomotives' weight by about 50,000 pounds (23,000 kg). The locomotives were deemed successful and remained in active service until after World War II.
