= Moselle (riverboat) =

1830s steam riverboat destroyed by boiler explosion

Coordinates: 39°7′12″N 84°28′30″W

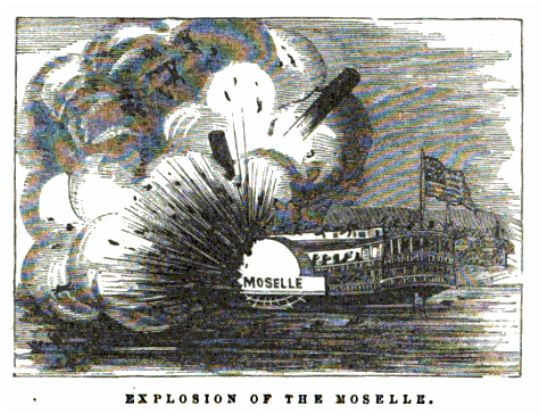
Explosion of the steamboat Moselle on April 25, 1838, near Cincinnati, Ohio

The Moselle was a riverboat constructed at the Fulton shipyard, in Cincinnati, Ohio. between December 1, 1837, and March 31, 1838. The Moselle was considered one of the fastest river boats in operation at the time, having completed a record-setting two-day, sixteen-hour trip between Cincinnati and St. Louis. On April 25, 1838, the Moselle, piloted by Captain Isaac Perin, suffered a boiler explosion just east of Cincinnati, killing 160 of the estimated 280–300 passengers.

During a brief stop at Fulton to take on additional passengers, Perin decided to keep the boilers at full steam in order to impress onlookers. The boat had just pulled away from a dock near the neighborhood of Fulton, when all four boilers simultaneously suffered a catastrophic failure resulting in the destruction of most of the ship. The remaining section drifted approximately 15 minutes / 100 yards before sinking to the bottom of the Ohio river. Negligence may have been a factor in the explosion: many eyewitness reports claimed that Captain Perin had been racing another riverboat, the Ben Franklin (1836) at the time of the explosion, and therefore the pressure in the boilers was excessively high.
