= List of deadliest tornadoes in the Americas =

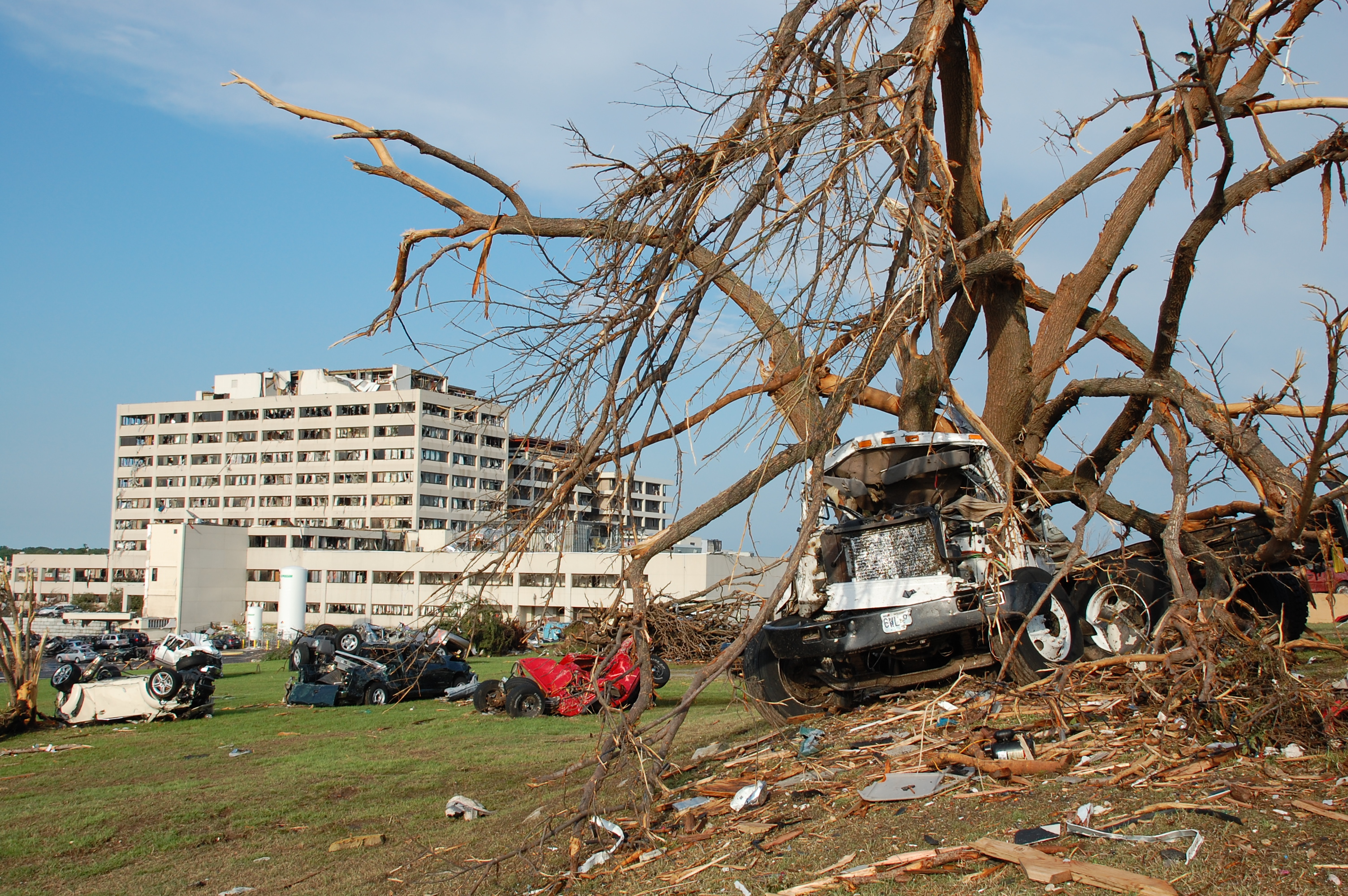
Damage inflicted by the 2011 Joplin tornado, the deadliest tornado thus far in the 21st century in the US.

The following is a list of the deadliest tornadoes in the Americas including Canada, Mexico, and the United States as well as the countries and islands of the Caribbean and the countries included in both Central America and South America. While the significant majority of tornadoes on this list occurred in the United States, there are also entries for Argentina, Bermuda, The Bahamas, Brazil, Canada, Cuba, Mexico, Panama, and Uruguay.

The deadliest tornado on record was the Daulatpur–Saturia tornado which occurred in the Dhaka division of Bangladesh on April 26, 1989. With a rating of at least F3 from the World Meteorological Organization and top winds estimated at greater than 200 mph (320 km/h), the tornado killed an estimated 1,300 people and injured at least 12,000 others. Of all the recorded tornadoes with death tolls of 100 or greater, at least 24 of them occurred in Bangladesh and/or India, and two of them occurred in Europe (in the countries of Italy and Malta).

In the Americas, there are 15 tornadoes on record that caused at least 100 fatalities, the most recent being the Joplin EF5 tornado which killed 161 people in May 2011. There are at least 450 tornadoes on record that caused greater than ten fatalities; the most recent of these was the Somerset-London Kentucky EF4 tornado which killed 19 people in May 2025.

== 100+ fatalities ==
Rank (Note: As of May 2023 (when this article was created).)	Affected Communities (Note: These are the communities (e.g. cities, towns, counties) where the greatest damage or loss of life occurred or at the beginning or end of the tornado’s track. The number of places that experience loss of life or damage is often higher than this. Colloquial tornado/event names, if applicable, are included in the Notes column of this table.)	Year	Month & Day	Fatalities (Note: The number of fatalities and injuries may vary from source to source. Most injury figures are approximate.)	Injuries (Note: The number of fatalities and injuries may vary from source to source. Most injury figures are approximate.)	F or EF (Note: After the Fujita Scale was implemented in 1971, tornadoes from the previous 100 years (1871–1971) were retrospectively reviewed to determine their ratings. These reviews were completed by either Ted Fujita or Thomas P. Grazulis. Damage assessments from 1971–2006 were completed by using the Fujita Scale or, since 2007, the Enhanced Fujita Scale. These reviews have been handled by teams of meteorologists and structural engineers as assigned by National Weather Service (NWS) offices around the United States.)	Notes	Other References
1	Ellington, Missouri-Murphysboro/De Soto, Illinois-Griffin/Princeton, Indiana	1925	March 18	689-695	2,027	F5	By far, the deadliest tornado in United States history and the second deadliest in world history. While the National Weather Service’s official death toll was 689, the American Red Cross reported 695 fatalities; however, the actual death toll was probably much higher than either figure as many people later died of their injuries	1925 Tri-State tornado
2	Natchez, Mississippi	1840	May 6	317	109	F4+		Great Natchez Tornado, (Grazulis, p. 559)
3	Encarnación, Paraguay	1926	September 20	300–500	500+	F5	The deadliest tornado in South American history. Estimates on number of fatalities differ.	1926 Encarnación tornado
3	St. Louis, Missouri—East St. Louis, Illinois	1896	May 27	255	1,000	F4	These figures probably do not include actual numbers of African-American people or residents of Shanty town boats in the Mississippi River who were killed or injured.	1896 St. Louis – East St. Louis tornado, (Grazulis, p. 676)
4	Tupelo, Mississippi	1936	April 5	216	700	F5	At least 100 people were still hospitalized when this death toll was published, so the actual death toll may be much higher. The Mississippi State Geologist estimated a death toll of 233. African-American casualties were not counted properly. (Grazulis gave this tornado an F5 rating.)	1936 Tupelo–Gainesville tornado outbreak, (Grazulis, p. 865)
5	Gainesville, Georgia	1936	April 6	203	1,600	F4	At least 40 people were still missing in collapsed buildings when these figures were published, so the actual death toll may be much higher.	1936 Tupelo–Gainesville tornado outbreak, (Grazulis, p. 866)
6	Glazier/Higgins, Texas—Woodward, Oklahoma	1947	April 9	181	970	F5	This was a family of tornadoes. Widely accepted death tolls per city are as follows: 107 in Woodward, 51 in Higgins, and 17 in Glazier. Six others were killed in rural parts of southern Oklahoma.	1947 Glazier–Higgins–Woodward tornado outbreak (Grazulis, p. 927)
7	Joplin, Missouri	2011	May 22	158	1,150	EF5	As of 2026, this is the only 21st century tornado in the Americas with a death toll greater than 100. Five additional people died from a rare Mucormycosis fungal infection (caused by Apophysomyces trapeziformis) that was found in their wounds; a police officer was struck by lightning and killed the following day while engaged in recovery efforts; and four others died from their injuries in the two weeks after the tornado. Those ten deaths were considered "indirect fatalities" and are not counted in the final death toll.	2011 Joplin tornado
8	Amite/Pine, Louisiana—Purvis/Richton, Mississippi	1908	April 24	143	770	F4		1908 Dixie tornado outbreak
9	New Richmond, Wisconsin	1899	June 12	117	200	F5	The number of fatalities could have been much lower, but a circus had come to town and a number of people from nearby communities were there when the tornado struck.	1899 New Richmond tornado
10	Flint—Beecher, Michigan	1953	June 8	116	844	F5		1953 Flint–Beecher tornado
11	Waco, Texas	1953	May 11	114	597	F5		1953 Waco tornado, (Grazulis, p. 970)
11	Goliad, Texas	1902	May 18	114	250	F4		1902 Goliad, Texas, tornado
13	Omaha, Nebraska	1913	March 23	103	350	F4		Tornado outbreak sequence of March 1913
14	Mattoon—Charleston, Illinois	1917	May 26	101	638	F4		Tornado outbreak sequence of May 25 – June 1, 1917, (Grazulis, p. 752)
15	Shinnston, West Virginia	1944	June 23	100	381	F4	Historians suggested a death toll as high as 153.	1944 Shinnston tornado

== 50–99 fatalities ==
Rank	Affected Communities	Year	Month & Day	Fatalities	Injuries	F or EF	Notes	Other References
16	Marshfield, Missouri	1880	April 18	99	200	F4	The death toll was probably higher. (Grazulis, p. 608)	Marshfield Cyclone
17	Maynard/Brockett, Arkansas—Poplar Bluff, Missouri	1927	May 9	98	300	F4		Tornado outbreak of May 1927, (Grazulis, p. 809)
17	Gainesville, Georgia	1903	June 1	98	180	F4	A 1932 newspaper reported a death toll of 104, which included deaths that occurred later due to injuries sustained during the tornado. (Grazulis, p. 700)	1903 Gainesville, Georgia, tornado
19	Snyder, Oklahoma	1905	May 10	97	150	F5		1905 Snyder tornado
20	Petersham—Barre—Rutland—Holden—Worcester—Shrewsbury—Westborough—Southborough, Massachusetts	1953	June 9	94	1,288	F4+	Grazulis has stated that this tornado should have been rated F5 (Grazulis, p. 974). He also stated that the previously reported death toll of 90 is incorrect, based on overwhelming evidence in John O’Toole's book Tornado! 84 Minutes, 94 Lives	1953 Worcester Tornado
21	DeWitt/Camanche, Iowa—Albany/Morrison Township, Illinois	1860	June 3	92	200	F4	Grazulis gave this an F4 rating. He also reported a death toll as high as 111.	(Grazulis, p. 566)
22	Concordia Parish, Louisiana—Natchez/Pine Ridge/Church Hill, Mississippi	1908	April 24	91	400	F4		1908 Dixie tornado outbreak
23	Starkville/Cedarbluff/Aberdeen, Mississippi—Bexar/Hackleburg/Phil Campbell/Spruce Pine/Waco/Mehama, Alabama	1920	April 20	88	700	F4		April 1920 tornado outbreak
24	Sandusky-Lorain, Ohio	1924	June 28	85	300	F4		1924 Lorain–Sandusky tornado (Grazulis, p. 790)
25	Udall, Kansas	1955	May 25	80	273	F5	Grazulis reported 270 injuries (Grazulis, p. 987)	1955 Great Plains tornado outbreak
26	St. Louis, Missouri	1927	September 29	79	550	F3		Tornado outbreak of September 29, 1927
27	Louisville/Jefferson County, Kentucky	1890	March 27	76	200	F4		Tornado outbreak of March 27, 1890
28	Rocksprings, Texas	1927	April 12	74	205	F5	One-third of the town was killed by this tornado.	
29	Farmington—Howe—Sherman, Texas	1896	May 15	73	200	F5		Tornado outbreak sequence of May 1896, (Grazulis, p. 674)
30	Hackleburg—Phil Campbell—Tanner—Harvest—Athens, Alabama	2011	April 27	72	145	EF5	"Hackleburg-Phil Campbell tornado" The deadliest single tornado in the 2011 Super Outbreak and in Alabama history.	2011 Hackleburg–Phil Campbell tornado
30	St. Cloud—Sauk Rapids, Minnesota	1886	April 14	72	213	F4	A couple was killed on their wedding day, with nine of their wedding guests also among the fatalities. (Grazulis, p. 637)	1886 St. Cloud-Sauk Rapids tornado outbreak
32	Pomeroy, Iowa	1893	July 6	71	200	F5	One report suggested a death toll as high as 89, but this could not be confirmed.	(Grazulis, p. 664)
32	Peggs, Oklahoma	1920	May 2	71	100	F4		
34	Antlers, Oklahoma	1945	April 12	69	353	F5	This tornado occurred the same afternoon as the death of U.S. President Franklin Delano Roosevelt; as a result, this extremely violent and deadly tornado received little or no media attention, even from local newspapers. (Grazulis, p. 919)	Tornado outbreak of April 12, 1945
35	Rippey—Grinnell—Malcom, Iowa	1882	June 17	68	300	F5	One report suggested a death toll as high as 130.	1882 Grinnell tornado (Grazulis, p. 615)
36	Tiptonville, Tennessee—Bondurant/Hickman/Clinton/Dublin, Kentucky	1917	May 27	67	345	F4		Tornado outbreak sequence of May 25 – June 1, 1917, (Grazulis, p. 752)
37	Tuscaloosa—Holt—Alberta City—Concord—Pleasant Grove—Birmingham (Pratt City)—Fultondale, Alabama	2011	April 27	64	1,500	EF4	"Tuscaloosa-Birmingham tornado" Second highest toll for a single tornado during the 2011 Super Outbreak.	2011 Tuscaloosa–Birmingham tornado
38	Itta Bena—Greenwood—Avalon, Mississippi—Cascilla—Otoucalofa—Tula, Mississippi	1942	March 16	63	500	F4		Tornado outbreak of March 16–17, 1942
38	San Justo, Santa Fe Province, Argentina	1973	January 10	63	350	F5	Dr. Ted Fujita studied this and determined it was "the worst tornado ever recorded in the world outside the borders of the United States." It was only on the ground for 0.9 mi (1.45 km)	San Justo tornado
40*	Williamsonville, Wisconsin	1871	October 8	60			*A "Fire-nado", an extension of a forest fire that engulfed about half of the Door County peninsula, killed three-quarters of the people (reports range between 57 and 60) in this small village. The National Weather Service now issues tornado warnings when conditions are favorable for the formation of "Fire-nadoes" during wildfires.	Peshtigo fire, (Grazulis, p. 575)
41	Mims Chapel/Avinger, Texas—Trigenta/Shiloh/Hempstead County, Arkansas	1921	April 15	59	300	F4		Grazulis, p. 773)
42	Cary/Gooden Lake/Pugh City/Morgan City/Money, Mississippi—Middleton, Tennessee	1971	February 21	58	795	F4	Grazulis reported 700 injuries (Grazulis, p. 1,121)	Tornado outbreak of February 21–22, 1971
42	Jackson, Mississippi	1966	March 3	58	518	F5	Grazulis reported 57 deaths and 504 injuries. (Grazulis, p. 1,079)	1966 Candlestick Park tornado outbreak
44	Mayfield—Princeton—Dawson Springs—Bremen, Kentucky	2021	December 10	57	515+	EF4		2021 Western Kentucky tornado
44	Fergus Falls, Minnesota	1919	June 22	57	200	F5		1919 Fergus Falls tornado (Grazulis, p. 764)
46	Wesson—Beauregard—Georgetown, Mississippi	1883	April 22	56	300	F4		(Grazulis, p. 617)
47	Warren, Arkansas	1949	January 3	55	435	F4		(Grazulis, p. 941)
47	Fort Smith—Van Buren, Arkansas	1898	January 11	55	113	F4		1898 Fort Smith, Arkansas, tornado (Grazulis, p. 681)
49	Steedman—Horrell Hill—Gaillard Crossroads, South Carolina	1924	April 30	53	534	F4	"The Horrell Hill Tornado"	April 1924 tornado outbreak, (Grazulis, p. 788)
50	Pryor, Oklahoma	1942	April 27	52	350	F4	Two days after the tornado struck, the Associated Press reported a total of 60 deaths; "an unofficial check of mortuaries in the storm area showed 70 known dead." The World History Project reported greater than 400 injuries.	(Grazulis, p. 899)
51	Kensett—Judsonia—Bald Knob—Russell, Arkansas	1952	March 21	50	325	F4		Tornado outbreak of March 21–22, 1952, (Grazulis, p. 962)

== 30–49 fatalities ==
Rank	Affected Communities	Year	Month & Day	Fatalities	Injuries	F or EF	Notes	Other References
52	Brinkley, Arkansas	1909	March 8	49	600	F4	A report from the NWS indicated 64 deaths and 671 injuries, although this may have been a combination of two tornadoes.	(Grazulis, p. 719)
52	Perry County—Lawley—Jemison—Union Grove—Chilton County, Alabama	1932	March 21	49	150	F4		1932 Deep South tornado outbreak, (Grazulis, p. 842)
52	Gilliam—Bolinger—Belcher, Louisiana	1908	May 13	49	135	F4		(Grazulis, p. 715)
55	Waverly/Melbourne Plantation, Louisiana—Delta City/Inverness/Moorhead, Mississippi	1971	February 21	47	510	F5	Grazulis reported 46 deaths and 400 injuries. (Grazulis, p. 1,121)	Tornado outbreak of February 21–22, 1971
55	Ortonville—Thomas—North Oxford—Whigville, Michigan	1896	May 25	47	100	F5		Tornado outbreak sequence of May 1896, (Grazulis, p. 676)
57	New Albany, Indiana	1917	March 23	46	250	F4		March 1917 tornado outbreak
58	Orland, Indiana—East Gilead/Reading/Hillsdale/Manitou Beach, Michigan	1965	April 11	44	587	F4	Per Grazulis, these two tornadoes were "inseparable" with regards to damage paths. Grazulis also reported a total of 612 injuries. (Grazulis, p. 1,065)	1965 Palm Sunday tornado outbreak
58	Williamsburg/Spring Hill, Kansas—Ruskin Heights/Raytown, Missouri	1957	May 20	44	531	F5	"The Ruskin Heights Tornado"	May 1957 Central Plains tornado outbreak sequence, (Grazulis, p. 1,007)
60	Wichita Falls, Texas	1979	April 10	42	1,740	F4	Twenty-five fatalities and 30 (out of 59) serious injuries were related to people trying to seek shelter or outrun the tornado in their cars (Grazulis, p. 1,209)	1979 Red River Valley tornado outbreak
61	Gantts Quarry—Sylacauga—Chandler Springs—Ashland, Alabama	1932	March 21	41	325	F4		1932 Deep South tornado outbreak, (Grazulis, p. 843)
61	Bynum—Mertens—Rankin—Bardwell—Ensign—Frost, Texas	1930	May 6	41	200	F4		(Grazulis, p. 834)
61	Gallatin, Tennessee—Holland/Beaumont, Kentucky	1925	March 18	41	95	F4	Grazulis reported 39 fatalities (Grazulis, p. 796)	Tri-State tornado outbreak
64	Norristown—Statesboro—Oliver, Georgia	1929	April 25	40	300	F4		(Grazulis, p. 825)
65	Lacey's Spring/Paint Rock/Jackson County, Alabama—Ladds Switch, Tennessee	1932	March 21	38	500	F4		1932 Deep South tornado outbreak, (Grazulis, p. 844)
65	Vicksburg, Mississippi	1953	December 5	38	270	F5		1953 Vicksburg, Mississippi, tornado (Grazulis, p. 976)
65	Bolivar—Henderson—Jack's Creek—Darden, Tennessee	1952	March 21	38	157	F4		Tornado outbreak of March 21–22, 1952 (Grazulis, p. 963)
68	Rochester, Minnesota	1883	August 21	37	200	F5	The lack of medical facilities needed to care for the injured indirectly led to the establishment of the Mayo Clinic	1883 Rochester tornado (Grazulis, p. 623)
68	Tuscaloosa—Northport, Alabama	1932	March 21	37	200	F4		1932 Deep South tornado outbreak, (Grazulis, p. 842)
68	Sandersville—Harmony—Nancy, Mississippi	1933	March 31	37	170	F4		(Grazulis, p. 848)
71	Bridge Creek—Moore—Oklahoma City, Oklahoma	1999	May 3	36	583	F5		1999 Bridge Creek-Moore tornado
71	Elkhart—Dunlap, Indiana	1965	April 11	36	321	F4	Grazulis reported 320 injuries. (Grazulis, p. 1,066)	1965 Palm Sunday tornado outbreak
71	Bay Springs—Rose Hill—Savoy—Meridian, Mississippi	1920	April 20	36	200	F4		April 1920 tornado outbreak, (Grazulis, p. 769)
71	Moundville, Alabama	1904	January 22	36	150	F4		(Grazulis, p. 701)
71	Tyler, Minnesota	1918	August 21	36	100	F4	Grazulis reported 225 injuries (Grazulis, p. 761)	1918 Tyler tornado
71	Tompkinsville—Sewell—Cundiff—Russell Springs, Kentucky	1933	May 9	36	87	F4		Tornado outbreak sequence of May 4–10, 1933
71	Kenedy—Runge—Nordheim, Texas	1930	May 6	36	60	F4		(Grazulis, p. 834)
78	Tuckerman—Jonesboro, Arkansas	1968	May 15	35	364	F4	Grazulis reported 361 injuries (Grazulis, p. 1,099)	Tornado outbreak of May 1968
78	Sulphur Springs—Pine Bluff, Arkansas	1947	June 1	35	300	F4		(Grazulis, p. 931)
78	Dora—Bergens—Warrior—Royal—Wynnville—Albertville—Sylvania, Alabama	1908	April 24	35	188	F4		1908 Dixie tornado outbreak
78	Livingston—Beatty Swamps, Tennessee	1933	May 10	35	150	F4		Tornado outbreak sequence of May 4–10, 1933, (Grazulis, p. 851)
78	Oklahoma City, Oklahoma	1942	June 12	35	100	F4		(Grazulis, p. 902)
78	Fazenda Fortaleza, Palmas, Paraná	1959	August 13	35	>300	F4		List of South American tornadoes and tornado outbreaks
83	Xenia, Ohio	1974	April 3	34	1,150	F5		1974 Xenia tornado, (Grazulis, p. 1,154)
83	Kirksville, Missouri	1899	April 27	34	125	F4		(Grazulis, p. 686)
83	Wallingford, Connecticut	1878	August 9	34	70	F4	Number of fatalities range from 29 to 34, depending on source (Grazulis, p. 596)	1878 Wallingford tornado
83	Zephyr, Texas	1909	May 30	34	70	F4		(Grazulis, p. 723)
83	Marquette, Kansas	1905	May 8	34	50	F4		(Grazulis, p. 705)
88	Oak Lawn—Evergreen Park—Chicago Illinois	1967	April 21	33	500	F4		1967 Oak Lawn tornado outbreak, (Grazulis, p. 1,089)
88	Fosterburg—Bunker Hill—Gillespie, Illinois	1948	March 19	33	449	F4		(Grazulis, p. 934)
90	Birmingham, Alabama	1998	April 8	32	259	F5		Tornado outbreak of April 6–9, 1998
90	Hazlehurst—Sardis, Mississippi	1969	January 23	32	241	F4		1969 Hazlehurst, Mississippi, tornadoes, (Grazulis, p. 1,103)
93	Brandenburg, Kentucky	1974	April 3	31	257	F5	Grazulis reported 270 injuries (Grazulis, p. 1.154)	1974 Brandenburg tornado
93	Goshen—Midway, Indiana	1965	April 11	31	252	F4		1965 Palm Sunday tornado outbreak
93	Plantersville—Stanton—Lomax—Marble Valley, Alabama	1932	March 21	31	200	F4		1932 Deep South tornado outbreak
93	Crane Creek—Flat Creek Township—Ozark—Linden—Panther Creek, Missouri	1880	April 18	31	100	F4	"The Finley Creek Tornado"	Tornado outbreak of April 1880, (Grazulis, p. 608)
93	Gardner—Oconee, Georgia	1921	February 10	31	100	F4		(Grazulis, p. 771)
93	Moore, Oklahoma	1893	April 25	31	100	F4		(Grazulis, p. 652)
98	Wellsburg, West Virginia—Chartiers Township/Dry Tavern, Pennsylvania—Oakland, Maryland	1944	June 23	30	300	F4		1944 Appalachians tornado outbreak, (Grazulis, p. 915)
98	Saragosa, Texas	1987	May 22	30	121	F4		1987 Saragosa tornado, (Grazulis, p. 1,278)
98	Lula/Dundee/Strayhorn/Arkabutla/Coldwater, Mississippi—La Grange, Tennessee	1900	November 20	30	100	F4		(Grazulis, p. 692)
98	Piedmont/Goshen/Rock Run, Alabama—Cave Spring, Georgia	1884	February 19	30	100	F4		Enigma tornado outbreak, (Grazulis, p. 625)
98	Stafford, Virginia—Charles County, Maryland	1818	August 15	30		F?	"The Potomac Gale" may have been a tornado or associated with a tornado, but it also may not have been a tornado at all. (Grazulis, p. 556)	
98	Washington, D.C.	1814	August 25	30		F?	Grazulis stated the fatalities probably included some British soldiers. (Grazulis, p. 555)	Burning of Washington, List of tornadoes in Washington, D.C.

== 25–29 fatalities ==
Rank	Affected Communities	Year	Month & Day	Fatalities	Injuries	F or EF	Notes	Other References
	Plainfield—Joliet, Illinois	1990	August 28	29	350	F5		1990 Plainfield tornado
	England—Cotton Plant—Hillemann, Arkansas	1952	March 21	29	180	F4	Grazulis reported 40 deaths and 274 injuries (Grazulis, p. 962)	Tornado outbreak of March 21–22, 1952
	Berryville, Arkansas	1942	October 29	29	100	F4		(Grazulis, p. 904)
	Horn Lake, Mississippi—Whitehaven/Newcastle/Bolivar/Scotts Hill/Perryville, Tennessee	1909	April 29	29	100	F4		Tornado outbreak of April 29 – May 1, 1909, (Grazulis, p. 721)
	Bee Spring—Millville, Tennessee	1909	April 29	29	70	F4		Tornado outbreak of April 29 – May 1, 1909, (Grazulis, p. 721)
	Minden (Gillark), Louisiana	1933	May 1	28	400	F4	The following day, one newspaper suggested as many as 55 deaths (Pittsburgh Post-Gazette; May 2, 1933; p. 1)	(Grazulis, p. 850)
	Regina, Saskatchewan, Canada	1912	June 30	28	300	F4	This is the deadliest tornado in Canada's history.	Regina Cyclone
	Guin—Delmar, Alabama	1974	April 3	28	272	F5	Grazulis reported 30 deaths and 280 injuries (Grazulis, p. 1,161)	1974 Guin tornado
	Moulton—Tanner (#1)—Harvest, Alabama	1974	April 3	28	267	F5	Grazulis reported 260 injuries (Grazulis, p. 1,160)	1974 Tanner tornadoes
	Elwood/Preston/Riggs/Delmar/Quigley (Petersville), Iowa—Savanna/Lanark/Forreston/Adeline, Illinois	1898	May 18	28	150	F4		(Grazulis, p. 683)
	Crawfordsville—Lebanon—Sheridan—Arcadia, Indiana	1965	April 11	28	123	F4		1965 Palm Sunday tornado outbreak, (Grazulis, p. 1,066)
	Sparta, Georgia—Edgefield, South Carolina	1875	March 20	28	70	F4	Death toll was as high as 20 in Columbia County, Georgia but only eight were counted (which suggests a total death toll of at least 40) (Grazulis, p. 582)	March 1875 Southeast tornado outbreak
	Edmonton, Alberta, Canada	1987	July 31	27	253	F4		Edmonton tornado
	LaGrange, Georgia	1920	March 28	27	100	F3	As many as "200 people dead + injured" (Grazulis, p. 768)	1920 Palm Sunday tornado outbreak
	Lily Flagg—Brownsboro—Gurley, Alabama	1920	April 20	27	100	F4		April 1920 tornado outbreak
	Sayre—Bradford—Village Springs, Alabama	1917	May 27	27	100	F4		Tornado outbreak sequence of May 25 – June 1, 1917, (Grazulis, p. 753)
	Charleston, South Carolina	1938	September 29	27	80	F2	Many fatalities occurred in collapsed buildings (Grazulis, p. 881)	
	Columbia—Macedonia, Tennessee	1900	November 20	27	75	F4	Most of the fatalities occurred in Macedonia (Grazulis, p. 693)	
	Drew County, Arkansas	1939	April 16	27	62	F4		(Grazulis, p. 883)
	Lower Peach Tree—Scyrene, Alabama	1913	March 21	27	60	F4		Tornado outbreak sequence of March 1913, (Grazulis, p. 737)
	Deemer/New Deemer—Philadelphia, Mississippi	1920	April 20	27	60	F4		April 1920 tornado outbreak, (Grazulis, p. 769)
	Jarrell, Texas	1997	May 27	27	12	F5		1997 Jarrell tornado
	Lubbock, Texas	1970	May 11	26	500	F5	Grazulis reported 28 deaths (Grazulis, p. 1,113)	Lubbock tornado
	Montgomery—Chisholm, Alabama	1945	February 12	26	293	F3		Tornado outbreak of February 12, 1945, (Grazulis, p. 918)
	Arab—Granite Bend—Dongola—Zalma, Missouri	1917	May 30	26	210	F4	Two tornadoes merged, estimated death tolls from each = 18 + 8, estimated total injuries = 200 + 10 (Grazulis, p. 754)	Tornado outbreak sequence of May 25 – June 1, 1917
	Villa María—Villa Nueva, Córdoba Province, Argentina	1928	November 12	26	150	F?	"Villa María tornado"	List of Southern Hemisphere tornadoes and tornado outbreaks
	Red Hill/Susanna/Red Ridge/Agricola, Alabama—West Point, Georgia	1920	March 28	26	125	F4		1920 Palm Sunday tornado outbreak, (Grazulis, p. 768)
	Alto—Kokomo—Greentown—Swayzee—Marion, Indiana	1965	April 11	25	835	F4		1965 Palm Sunday tornado outbreak
	McDonald Chapel—Birmingham, Alabama	1956	April 15	25	200	F4		1956 McDonald Chapel tornado
	Seneca/Oneida/Sabetha/Reserve, Kansas—Falls City, Nebraska	1896	May 17	25	200	F5		Tornado outbreak sequence of May 1896
	Barney—Heber Springs—Banner, Arkansas	1916	June 5	25	150	F4		June 1916 tornado outbreak, (Grazulis, p. 747)
	Campbell—Poinciana—Kissimmee—Buenaventura Lakes—Lake Hart—Lake Mary Jane, Florida	1998	February 22	25	150	F3	This was the deadliest single tornado in Florida’s recorded history.	1998 Kissimmee tornado outbreak
	Franklin Springs/Royston/Nuberg/Sandy Cross, Georgia—Abbeville County, South Carolina	1944	April 16	25	120	F4		(Grazulis, p. 912)
	Louisville, Kentucky	1854	August 27	25	100	F?		(Grazulis, p. 562)
	Council Bluffs—Gilliatt—Weston—Neola—Harlan, Iowa	1913	March 23	25	75	F4		Tornado outbreak sequence of March 1913, (Grazulis, p. 737)
	Hancock—Kossuth—Worth Counties in Iowa	1894	September 21	25	60	F4		(Grazulis, p. 667)
	Lakeview/Fyffe/Rainsville/Sylvania, Alabama—Rising Fawn, Georgia	2011	April 27	25		EF5	Unknown number of injuries. "Rainsville EF5 tornado"	2011 Rainsville tornado

== 20–24 fatalities ==
Rank	Affected Communities	Year	Month & Day	Fatalities	Injuries	F or EF	Notes	Other References
	Belvidere, Illinois	1967	April 21	24	410	F4	Grazulis reported 500 injuries (Grazulis, p. 1,088)	1967 Oak Lawn tornado outbreak
	Smith Mills, Kentucky—Evansville—Paradise—Gentryville, Indiana	2005	November 6	24	238	F3		Evansville tornado outbreak of November 2005
	Moore, Oklahoma	2013	May 20	24	212	EF5		2013 Moore tornado
	Ingomar—Baker—Keownville—Glen, Mississippi	1920	April 20	24	180	F4		April 1920 tornado outbreak
	New Baden—Germantown—Mascoutah, Illinois	1896	May 27	24	125	F4		Tornado outbreak sequence of May 1896, (Grazulis, p. 677)
	Eureka Springs—Green Forest—Berryville, Arkansas	1927	March 18	24	110	F4		(Grazulis, p. 806)
	New Castle—Millville (Henry County)—Hagerstown—Greens Fork, Indiana	1917	March 11	24	110	F4		(Grazulis, p. 750)
	Mineola—Blodgett—Spring Hill, Texas	1919	April 9	24	100	F4		Tornado outbreak of April 1919
	Mayersville—Grace—Isola—Moorhead, Mississippi	1919	March 16	24	80	F4	Grazulis reported that the death toll may have been higher.	(Grazulis, p. 762)
	Mount Vernon, Illinois	1888	February 19	24	80	F4	This was the only fatal tornado during this rare February outbreak. (Grazulis, p. 643)	
	Stantonville—Pittsburg Landing, Tennessee	1909	October 14	24	80	F3		(Grazulis, p. 725)
	Strong, Arkansas	1927	May 9	24	72	F4		Tornado outbreak of May 1927
	St. Mary's—Lisbon—Mount Vernon—Mechanicsville, Iowa	1860	June 3	24	60	F?		(Grazulis, p. 566)
	Cordele—Crisp County, Georgia	1936	April 2	23	500	F4		1936 Cordele-Greensboro tornado outbreak. (Grazulis, p. 865)
	Coldwater Lake–Hillsdale–Manitou Beach–Devils Lake–Tecumseh, Michigan	1965	April 11	23	294	F4		List of tornadoes in the 1965 Palm Sunday tornado outbreak
	Howard—Mitchell Counties, Texas	1923	May 14	23	250	F5	A man and his three sons were killed in one house (Grazulis, p. 783)	
	Cisco, Texas	1893	April 28	23	150	F4	Death toll may have been as high as 26	(Grazulis, p. 662)
	Smithville, Mississippi—Hodges, Alabama	2011	April 27	23	137	EF5		2011 Smithville tornado
	Cape Girardeau, Missouri—Alexander County, Illinois	1949	May 21	23	130	F4		(Grazulis, p. 948)
	Oklahoma City—Bethany, Oklahoma	1930	November 19	23	125	F4		(Grazulis, p. 839)
	Pee Dee—Rockingham—Philadelphia (Church)—Manly, North Carolina	1884	February 19	23	100	F4		Enigma tornado outbreak, (Grazulis, p. 626)
	Beauregard, Alabama	2019	March 3	23	97	EF4		2019 Beauregard tornado
	Greenbrier—Enders—Heber Springs, Arkansas	1926	November 25	23	90	F4	Reported as 20 deaths and 75 injuries elsewhere	(Grazulis, p. 804)
	Batesville—Moorefield—Sneed—Swifton, Arkansas	1929	April 10	23	80	F5		(Grazulis, p. 824)
	Andale—Sedgwick—McLain—Elbing, Kansas	1917	May 25	23	70	F5		Tornado outbreak sequence of May 25 – June 1, 1917, (Grazulis, p. 751)
	Meridian, Mississippi	1906	March 2	23	60	F4		(Grazulis, p. 707)
	Ossian/Townley, Indiana—Brunersburg/Raabs Corner, Ohio	1920	March 28	23	54	F4		1920 Palm Sunday tornado outbreak, (Grazulis, p. 768)
	Canoinhas, Santa Catarina, Brazil	1948	May 16	23		F?	"Several animal casualties" were also reported	List of Southern Hemisphere tornadoes and tornado outbreaks
	Charleston—Beaufort County, South Carolina	1814	June 30	23		F?	Started as a tornado on land then moved into Port Royal Sound; as a waterspout, killed 23 of the 40 people who were on board the schooner "Alligator"	(Grazulis, p. 555)
	Larose, Louisiana	1964	October 3	22	165	F4	Deadliest hurricane-spawned tornado on record (since 1900) and one of only two to reach F4 intensity	Hurricane Hilda tornado outbreak, (Grazulis, p. 1057)
	Ragland—Piedmont—Goshen—Rock Run, Alabama	1994	March 27	22	150	F4		1994 Palm Sunday tornado outbreak
	Birmingham—Smithfield, Alabama	1977	April 4	22	125	F5		Tornado outbreak of April 1977
	Cartersville—Jasper—Cagle—Tate—Mount Oglethorpe, Georgia	1884	February 19	22	100	F4		Enigma tornado outbreak, (Grazulis, p. 625)
	Viroqua, Wisconsin	1865	June 28	22	100	F?		1865 Viroqua tornado, (Grazulis, p. 568)
	Margaret/Ragland/Shoal Creek Valley/Ohatchee/Piedmont, Alabama—Cave Spring/Kingston, Georgia	2011	April 27	22	85	EF4		2011 Shoal Creek Valley–Ohatchee tornado
	Macon, Mississippi	1880	April 25	22	72	F4		(Grazulis, p. 609)
	Castalian Springs/Lafayette, Tennessee—Tompkinsville, Kentucky	2008	February 5	22	63	EF3		List of tornadoes in the 2008 Super Tuesday tornado outbreak
	Yutan, Nebraska—Logan, Iowa	1913	March 23	22	50	F4		Tornado outbreak sequence of March 1913, (Grazulis, p. 737)
	Goodwater/Oak Bowery, Alabama—Harris/Talbot Counties, Georgia	1875	May 1	22	30	F3	Death toll may have been at least 35 based on a total of 26 (unconfirmed) deaths in Talbot County.	(Grazulis, p. 583)
	Sabinas—Hondo Coal Mine, Coahuila, Mexico	1899	May 10	22		F?	Possibly greater than 22 deaths	List of Central American tornadoes
	Huntsville, Alabama	1989	November 15	21	463	F4		November 1989 tornado outbreak
	Picher, Oklahoma—Racine/Neosho, Missouri	2008	May 10	21	350	EF4	This was one of the catalysts that made Picher a ghost town. It was already mostly abandoned due to mining waste that had sickened many of its residents.	2008 Picher–Neosho tornado
	St. Louis, Missouri	1959	February 10	21	345	F4		St. Louis tornado outbreak of February 1959
	Coldwater Lake–Hillsdale–Manitou Beach–Devils Lake–Tecumseh, Michigan	1965	April 11	21	293	F4	-->	List of tornadoes in the 1965 Palm Sunday tornado outbreak
	Prescott, Kansas—Sprague, Missouri	1887	April 21	21	250	F4		(Grazulis, p. 642)
	Terre Haute, Indiana	1913	March 23	21	250	F4		Tornado outbreak sequence of March 1913, (Grazulis, p. 738)
	Brent—Centreville—Helena, Alabama	1933	May 5	21	200	F4		Tornado outbreak sequence of May 4–10, 1933
	Metropolis, Illinois—Sheridan/Blackford/Dixon/Delaware/West Louisville, Kentucky	1890	March 27	21	200	F4		Tornado outbreak of March 27, 1890, (Grazulis, p. 650)
	Colfax, Wisconsin	1958	June 4	21	110	F5	Grazulis reported 20 deaths and an F4 rating (Grazulis, p. 1,015)	Tornado outbreak of June 3–4, 1958
	Rojas, Buenos Aires Province, Argentina	1816	September 16	21	82	F?	"The Rojas Tornado" was one of the first tornadoes on record in Argentina.	List of Southern Hemisphere tornadoes and tornado outbreaks
	Grenada, Mississippi	1846	May 7	21	62	F?	At least 21 deaths	(Grazulis, p. 561)
	Bondurant—Santiago—Valeria—Mingo, Iowa	1896	May 24	21	60	F4		Tornado outbreak sequence of May 1896, (Grazulis, p. 676)
	Casscoe—Holly Grove—Duncan, Arkansas	1944	April 10	21	50	F4		(Grazulis, p. 911)
	Rodessa, Louisiana	1938	February 17	21	50	F4		(Grazulis, p. 873)
	McAlester, Oklahoma	1882	May 8	21	42	F3		(Grazulis, p. 615)
	Ringgold, Georgia—Apison/Cleveland/Etowah, Tennessee	2011	April 27	20	335	EF4		2011 Ringgold-Apison tornado
	Bellwood—Maywood—Melrose Park—Dunning (Chicago), Illinois	1920	March 28	20	300	F4		1920 Palm Sunday tornado outbreak
	Blackwell, Oklahoma	1955	May 25	20	280	F5		1955 Great Plains tornado outbreak, (Grazulis, p. 987)
	Commerce Landing, Mississippi	1955	February 1	20	141	F3	Official records stated that this was not a tornado despite witness reports to the contrary and the carrying/throwing of heavy objects for long distances.	(Grazulis, p. 985)
	Wellington Township—Cairo Township—West Newton—New Ulm, Minnesota	1881	July 15	20	93	F4		1881 Minnesota tornado outbreak, (Grazulis, p. 612)
	Silverton, Texas	1957	May 15	20	80	F4		(Grazulis, p. 1,006)
	Deanburg—Pinson, Tennessee	1923	March 11	20	70	F5		(Grazulis, p. 782)
	Overton—Rocheport—Midway—-Hinton, Missouri—Centralia, Missouri	1917	June 5	20	68	F4		(Grazulis, p. 756)

== 15–19 fatalities ==
Rank	Affected Communities	Year	Month & Day	Fatalities	Injuries	F or EF	Notes	Other References
	Asherville—Coatesville—Amo—Hadley—Danville, Indiana	1948	March 26	19	200	F4		(Grazulis, p. 936)
	Somerset—London, Kentucky	2025	May 16	19	108	EF4	1 indirect fatality	2025 Somerset–London tornado
	Anderson—Belton, South Carolina	1933	May 5	19	100	F3		Tornado outbreak sequence of May 4–10, 1933
	Hopewell (Blount County)—Summit, Alabama	1903	April 8	19	100	F4		(Grazulis, p. 697)
	Nevada—Josephine—Farmersville—Tigertown, Texas	1927	May 9	19	100	F4		Tornado outbreak of May 1927
	Rainbow Lake (Shipshewana)—Ontario—Brighton, Indiana	1965	April 11	19	100	F4	The National Weather Service reported only five deaths and 41 injuries	List of tornadoes in the 1965 Palm Sunday tornado outbreak, (Grazulis, p. 1,065)
	Putnam County—Cookeville, Tennessee	2020	March 3	19	87	EF4		2020 Baxter–Cookeville tornado
	Ellison, Illinois	1858	May 31	19	60	F?		(Grazulis, p. 565)
	Duncan, Mississippi	1929	February 25	19	42	F4		(Grazulis, p. 822)
	Otterbein—Monticello—Valentine, Indiana	1974	April 3	18	362	F4	Grazulis reported 19 fatalities (Grazulis, p. 1,159)	List of tornadoes in the 1974 Super Outbreak
	Newton Falls/Niles/Hubbard, Ohio—Wheatland/Hermitage/Greenfield, Pennsylvania	1985	May 31	18	310	F5		List of tornadoes in the 1985 United States-Canada tornado outbreak, (Grazulis, p. 1,268)
	Albany—Dougherty County, Georgia	1940	February 10	18	300	F4		(Grazulis, p. 889)
	Warner Robins—Robins Air Force Base—Jeffersonville, Georgia	1953	April 30	18	300	F4	Grazulis reported 19 deaths (Grazulis, p. 968)	Tornado outbreak sequence of April 28 – May 2, 1953
	Toledo, Ohio—Lost Peninsula (Michigan)	1965	April 11	18	236	F4		List of tornadoes in the 1965 Palm Sunday tornado outbreak
	Cotton Valley—Leton—Dykesville—Haynesville, Louisiana	1947	December 31	18	225	F4		(Grazulis, p. 933)
	Pittsfield—Grafton—Strongsville, Ohio	1965	April 11	18	200	F5		List of tornadoes in the 1965 Palm Sunday tornado outbreak
	Tomato, Arkansas—Dyersburg/Sharon/Ore Springs, Tennessee	1917	May 27	18	175	F4		Tornado outbreak sequence of May 25 – June 1, 1917, (Grazulis, p. 752)
	Sheridan—England—Hazen, Arkansas	1949	March 26	18	150	F4		(Grazulis, p. 942)
	Cullman—Phelan—Berlin—Fairview, Alabama	1932	March 21	18	100	F4		1932 Deep South tornado outbreak, (Grazulis, p. 842)
	Douglas/Syracuse/Berlin (Otoe)/Rock Bluff, Nebraska—Bartlett/Glenwood, Iowa	1913	March 23	18	100	F4	"The Berlin Tornado" (Grazulis, p. 737)	Tornado outbreak sequence of March 1913
	Logansport—Shreveport—Barksdale (Slack) AFB, Louisiana	1950	February 12	18	77	F4	Grazulis reported eight deaths and 70 injuries (Grazulis, p. 953)	Tornado outbreak of February 11–13, 1950
	Blue Ridge—Delba—Trenton—Ector—Ravenna, Texas	1919	April 8	18	60	F4		Tornado outbreak of April 1919
	Crenshaw—Pike Counties, Alabama	1925	October 25	18	60	F4		(Grazulis, p. 800)
	Delphos—Irving, Kansas	1879	May 30	18	60	F4		(Grazulis, p. 601)
	Rib Lake—Withee—Thorp—Owen, Wisconsin	1924	September 21	18	50	F4		
	Montague County, Texas	1905	July 5	18	40	F4	Not listed as an official tornado in the State of Texas (or elsewhere) but was witnessed as such (funnel cloud, debris carried for many miles). This atypically violent (for Texas) July tornado wiped out the Long Branch, Barrel Springs, and Dixie farming communities. Path width reportedly varied from 0.25–3 miles.	(Grazulis, p. 706)
	Deshler—Cygnet—West Cleveland, Ohio	1953	June 8	17	379	F4		Flint-Worcester tornado outbreak sequence
	Saugatuck—Hudsonville—Standale—Grand Rapids, Michigan	1956	April 3	17	292	F5	Grazulis reported 18 deaths and 340 injuries (Grazulis, p. 995)	Tornado outbreak of April 2–3, 1956
	Bejucal, Mayabeque Province, Cuba	1940	December 26	17	240	F4	Deadliest and most violent tornado in Cuba’s history	List of Caribbean Tornadoes
	Haysville—McConnell AFB—Andover, Kansas	1991	April 26	17	225	F5		1991 Andover tornado
	McKeesport—Dravosburg—Port Vue—Versailles—Boston—Greenock—Donegal—Somerset, Pennsylvania	1944	June 23	17	200	F4		1944 Appalachians tornado outbreak, (Grazulis, p. 915)
	Melvindale, Michigan, United States—Windsor/Tecumseh, Ontario, Canada	1946	June 17	17	200	F4	Likely greater than 200 injuries. All of the fatalities, many of the injuries, and all of the F4 damage occurred in Ontario. Grazulis reported a death toll of 15 but an unknown Canadian source suggested as high as 18.	1946 Windsor-Tecumseh tornado, (Grazulis, p. 924)
	Milton, Florida	1962	March 31	17	200	F3		Tornado outbreak of March 30–31, 1962, (Grazulis, p. 1,040)
	Rolling Fork—Midnight—Silver City, Mississippi	2023	March 24	17	165	EF4		2023 Rolling Fork–Silver City tornado
	Birmingham—Avondale—Irondale, Alabama	1901	March 25	17	100	F3		(Grazulis, p. 693)
	Harper—Kellogg—Wellington, Kansas	1892	May 27	17	100	F4		(Grazulis, p. 657)
	Smith Chapel—Princedale—Parkin, Arkansas	1929	April 10	17	100	F4		(Grazulis, p. 824)
	Yarbro, Arkansas—Cooter, Missouri—Owl Hoot/Miston/Ridgely/Elbridge, Tennessee	1952	March 21	17	100	F4	Grazulis reported 25 deaths and 150 injuries (Grazulis, p. 963)	Tornado outbreak of March 21–22, 1952
	West Liberty (Jay County)/Geneva/Ceylon, Indiana—Van Wert, Ohio	1920	March 28	17	70	F4		1920 Palm Sunday tornado outbreak, (Grazulis, p. 768)
	La Plata—Cedarville, Maryland	1926	November 9	17	65	F4		(Grazulis, p. 804)
	Eustace—Big Rock—Tundra—Grand Saline, Texas	1919	April 9	17	60	F4	Grazulis reported 20 deaths (Grazulis, p. 764)	Tornado outbreak of April 1919
	Franklin/Richland/Madison/East Carroll Parish, Louisiana—Issaquena/Sharkey Counties, Mississippi	1919	March 16	17	50	F3		
	Mifflin Township (Owensville)—Linden Township (Lost Grove)—Mineral Point—Oregon—Fitchburg, Wisconsin	1878	May 23	17	45	F4		(Grazulis, p. 594)
	Wall Lake—Sac City—Pomeroy, Iowa	1878	April 21	17	29	F4	"Boyer River Tornado"	(Grazulis, p. 594)
	Jud—O'Brien—Knox City, Texas	1953	March 13	17	25	F4	Grazulis reported as many as 60 injuries (Grazulis, p. 966)	Tornado outbreak of March 12–15, 1953
	Bellevue—Stoneburg, Texas	1906	April 26	17	20	F4	Grazulis reported 50 injuries (Grazulis, p. 707)	
	Topeka, Kansas	1966	June 8	16	450	F5	Grazulis reported 406 injuries (Grazulis, p. 1,081)	Tornado outbreak sequence of June 1966
	Itu, São Paulo, Brazil	1991	September 30	16	350	F4		List of tornadoes in Brazil
	Colby—Prescott, Kansas	1887	April 21	16	250	F4		(Grazulis, p. 642)
	Kingsport/Hancock County, Tennessee	1933	March 14	16	235	F3		March 1933 Nashville tornado outbreak, (Grazulis, p. 847)
	Abbeville—Ninety Six—Chappells—Prosperity—Greenwood, South Carolina	1944	April 16	16	200	F4		(Grazulis, p. 912)
	Mayflower—Vilonia, Arkansas	2014	April 27	16	193	EF4		2014 Mayflower–Vilonia tornado
	Tanner, Alabama (#2)—Manchester, Tennessee	1974	April 3	16	190	F5	Grazulis reported 22 deaths and 250 injuries. This was the second F5 tornado to pass through Tanner during the 1974 Super Outbreak. (Grazulis, p. 1,160)	1974 Tanner tornadoes
	Snow Hill—Ayden—Winterville—Greenville, North Carolina	1984	March 28	16	153	F4		1984 Carolinas tornado outbreak
	Jamestown—Atlantic, Pennsylvania—Sheakleyville—Dempseytown—Cherry Tree, Pennsylvania	1985	May 31	16	125	F4		List of tornadoes in the 1985 United States-Canada tornado outbreak, (Grazulis, p. 1,268)
	Wilburton—Keota—Sallisaw, Oklahoma	1960	May 5	16	106	F4		May 1960 tornado outbreak sequence
	Mount Carmel, Illinois	1877	June 4	16	100	F4	Some historical accounts suggest as many as 30 fatalities but this is unconfirmed.	(Grazulis, p. 588)
	Missouri City—Richmond, Missouri	1878	June 1	16	90	F4	Six months after the tornado, a local newspaper reported 21 fatalities	(Grazulis, p. 595)
	McLoud—Paden—Boley (Childsville)—Welty, Oklahoma	1942	May 2	16	80	F4		(Grazulis, p. 900)
	Byhalia, Mississippi—Moscow, Tennessee	1952	March 21	16	74	F4	Grazulis reported 17 fatalities and 94 injuries (Grazulis, p. 963)	Tornado outbreak of March 21–22, 1952
	Mason City/Osage, Iowa—LeRoy/Spring Valley, Minnesota	1894	September 21	16	70	F4		(Grazulis, p. 667)
	Newbern, Tennessee	2006	April 2	16	70	F3		Tornado outbreak of April 2, 2006
	Bowling Green, Kentucky	2021	December 11	16	63	EF3		Tornado outbreak of December 10–11, 2021
	Talihina—Reichert—Howe, Oklahoma	1961	May 5	16	58	F4		Tornado outbreak sequence of May 3–9, 1961, (Grazulis, p. 1,035)
	Wilkes-Barre, Pennsylvania	1890	August 19	16	50	F3	Grazulis reported 60 injuries (Grazulis, p. 653)	1890 Wilkes-Barre tornado
	Clarendon—Sherwood Shores/Green Belt Reservoir—McLean, Texas	1970	April 18	16	42	F4	Grazulis reported 17 fatalities and 41 injuries (Grazulis, p. 1,111)	Tornado outbreak sequence of April 17–19, 1970
	Vireton (now McAlester), Oklahoma	1917	January 4	16	20	F3	All 16 fatalities were children at a poorly constructed Choctaw Indiana Baptist Mission school. Nine other children and their teacher sustained serious injuries. In an attempt to save the children, the teacher braced herself against the door; her jaw was broken as the building fell apart around them. It's one of the worst such incidents in United States history.	(Grazulis, p. 749)
	Pomona Lake, in Osage County, Kansas	1978	June 17	16	3	F1	The "Whippoorwill Disaster" occurred when a tornado struck a tourist boat of the same name, causing it to capsize. At least 16 of the 58 people on board were killed. It remains the deadliest F1 tornado in recorded history.	1978 Whippoorwill tornado
	Laredo, Texas—Nuevo Laredo, Mexico	1905	April 28	16		F?	Grazulis states that information about this tornado is scarce. Of the 16 fatalities, nine were in Texas and seven were in Nuevo Laredo. Numerous other sources report deaths tolls from 21 to 100 but none of these are confirmed. The New York Times reported that 21 people were killed and "scores" were injured . The Sydney Morning Herald (Australia) reported that 100 were killed, and many others were injured.	(Grazulis, p. 706)
	Bauxite—Vimy Ridge—Shannon Hills—North Little Rock, Arkansas	1997	March 1	15	200	F4	At least 200 injuries	March 1997 tornado outbreak
	Bethel Springs—Reagan (Henderson County)—Finger—Enville—Beacon, Tennessee	1942	March 16	15	200	F4		Tornado outbreak of March 16–17, 1942
	Alexandria—Pineville—Libuse, Louisiana	1923	April 4	15	150	F4		(Grazulis, p. 783)
	Schlater—Philipp—Water Valley—Pinedale, Mississippi	1984	April 21	15	76	F3		(Grazulis, p. 1,255)
	Hamburg, Arkansas	1941	October 26	15	75	F4		(Grazulis, p. 896)
	Palestine, Texas	1946	January 4	15	60	F4		Tornado outbreak of January 4–6, 1946
	Armuchee—Everett Springs—Curryville—Oostanaula—Resaca, Georgia	1913	March 13	15	50	F4		(Grazulis, p. 736)
	Beaverdale, Georgia—Conasauga, Polk County, Tennessee	1932	March 21	15	50	F4		1932 Deep South tornado outbreak
	Braxton, Mississippi	1921	April 26	15	50	F4		Grazulis, p. 774)
	Chambers County, Alabama—Troup/Meriwether Counties, Georgia	1875	May 1	15	50	F3		(Grazulis, p. 583)
	El Dorado, Kansas	1958	June 10	15	50	F4		(Grazulis, p. 1,015)
	Nashville—Lebanon—Bellwood, Tennessee	1933	March 14	15	45	F3		March 1933 Nashville tornado outbreak, (Grazulis, p. 847)
	Garland, Texas	1927	May 9	15	40	F4		Tornado outbreak of May 1927, (Grazulis, p. 809)
	Oberlin—Cedar Bluffs, Kansas	1942	April 29	15	25	F5		(Grazulis, p. 900)

== 12–14 fatalities ==
Rank	Affected Communities	Year	Month & Day	Fatalities	Injuries	F or EF	Notes	Other References
	Ciudad Acuña, Coahuila, Mexico	2015	May 25	14	290	EF3		2015 Texas–Oklahoma flood and tornado outbreak
	Greenwood, Arkansas	1968	April 19	14	270	F4		(Grazulis, p. 1,096)
	Shelburn—Lewis—Clay City—Cloverdale, Indiana	1949	May 21	14	251	F4		(Grazulis, p. 947)
	Gloster—Gillsburg, Mississippi	1935	April 6	14	220	F3		(Grazulis, p. 860)
	Wakarusa—Elliott—Goshen—Middlebury, Indiana	1965	April 11	14	200	F4		List of tornadoes in the 1965 Palm Sunday tornado outbreak, (Grazulis, p. 1,063)
	Drumright—Olive—Oak Grove (Pawnee County)—Skiatook, Oklahoma	1974	June 8	14	150	F4		Tornado outbreak of June 8, 1974, (Grazulis, p. 1,165)
	Greensboro, North Carolina	1936	April 2	14	144	F4		1936 Cordele-Greensboro tornado outbreak, (Grazulis, p. 865)
	Lynchburg—Sardis—Effingham—Pamplico, South Carolina	1924	April 30	14	144	F3		April 1924 tornado outbreak, (Grazulis, p. 788)
	Clarita—Coalgate, Oklahoma	1917	June 1	14	100	F4		Tornado outbreak sequence of May 25 – June 1, 1917, (Grazulis, p. 754)
	Plum Creek/Kossuth County/Buffalo Center, Iowa—Kiester, Minnesota	1894	September 21	14	100	F5		(Grazulis, p. 667)
	Rockford, Illinois	1928	September 14	14	100	F4		(Grazulis, p. 821)
	Barnettsville (now Barnett)—New Bloomfield, Missouri	1880	April 18	14	90	F4		Tornado outbreak of April 1880, (Grazulis, p. 608)
	Columbiana, Alabama	1932	March 21	14	75	F4		1932 Deep South tornado outbreak, (Grazulis, p. 843)
	Converse—Pleasant Hill (Sabine Parish)—Lake End, Louisiana	1927	February 17	14	70	F3		(Grazulis, p. 805)
	Savoy, Texas	1880	May 28	14	60	F4		(Grazulis, p. 610)
	Covington—Bells—Medina, Tennessee	1909	April 29	14	50	F3		Tornado outbreak of April 29 – May 1, 1909, (Grazulis, p. 721)
	New Minden—Hoyleton—Richview—Irvington—Boyd, Illinois	1896	May 27	14	50	F4		Tornado outbreak sequence of May 1896, (Grazulis, p. 676)
	Pisgah/Flat Rock/Higdon, Alabama—Trenton/Valley View/Flintstone/Fairview/(Western) Fort Oglethorpe, Georgia	2011	April 27	14	50	EF4		List of tornadoes in the 2011 Super Outbreak
	Oxford—Worth—Denver, Missouri	1947	April 29	14	45	F4		(Grazulis, p. 928)
	Chandler, Oklahoma	1897	March 30	14	40	F4		(Grazulis, p. 680)
	Clyde, Texas	1938	June 10	14	40	F5		(Grazulis, p. 879)
	Monroe City—Miller Township (Marion County), Missouri	1876	March 10	14	40	F4		(Grazulis, p. 586)
	Mulberry Township—Cravens—Jethro—Watalula, Arkansas	1908	November 23	14	40	F3	These are all unincorporated communities within Franklin County, Arkansas	(Grazulis, p. 717)
	Tuscumbia—“Brickville”, Alabama	1874	November 22	14	30	F4		(Grazulis, p. 581)
	Charles City, Iowa	1968	May 15	13	450	F5		1968 Hansell-Charles City tornado
	Selma—Plantersville, Alabama	1885	November 6	13	400	F4		(Grazulis, p. 637)
	Muskogee, Oklahoma	1945	April 12	13	200	F4		Tornado outbreak of April 1945, (Grazulis, p. 919)
	Bovina—Little Yazoo—Bentonia, Mississippi	1971	February 21	13	182	F4	Grazulis reported 200 injuries (Grazulis, p. 1,121)	Tornado outbreak of February 21–22, 1971
	San Angelo, Texas	1953	May 11	13	159	F4		1953 Waco tornado outbreak, (Grazulis, p. 970)
	Bool’s Gap—Quenalda—Hassell Gap—Bellview (Clay’s County)—Newell, Alabama	1932	March 21	13	150	F4	Grazulis reported 160 injuries (Grazulis, p. 843)	1932 Deep South tornado outbreak
	Odell—Huntington—Etoile, Texas	1933	March 30	13	150	F3		(Grazulis, p. 848)
	Atkins—Clinton—Mountain View—Highland, Arkansas	2008	February 5	13	140	EF4		2008 Atkins–Clinton tornado
	Cairo—Bluffton, Ohio	1965	April 11	13	104	F4		List of tornadoes in the 1965 Palm Sunday tornado outbreak, (Grazulis, p. 1,071)
	Lake Bruin, Louisiana	1927	February 17	13	100	F2		(Grazulis, p. 805)
	Robinsonville, Mississippi	1893	April 12	13	100	F3		(Grazulis, p. 661)
	Rye Cove, Virginia	1929	May 2	13	100	F2		1929 Rye Cove tornado outbreak
	West Feliciana—East Feliciana Parishes, Louisiana	1907	April 5	13	100	F3		(Grazulis, p. 709)
	Kellerville—Timewell—Mount Sterling—Rushville—Astoria—South Pekin—Morton—Eureka, Illinois	1938	March 30	13	73	F3		(Grazulis, p. 876)
	West Brooklyn—Compton—Paw Paw—Sublette, Illinois	1890	June 20	13	60	F4		(Grazulis, p. 652)
	Jackson, Mississippi	1916	June 6	13	56	F3		June 1916 tornado outbreak
	Carrollton—Reform—Cordova—Sipsey—Blountsville, Alabama	2011	April 27	13	54	EF4		2011 Cordova–Blountsville tornado
	Paisley—Lake Mack—DeLand, Florida	2007	February 2	13	51	EF3		2007 Groundhog Day tornado outbreak
	Felton—Rockmart—Cartersville—Stilesboro, Georgia	1909	April 30	13	40	F3	Actual death toll could have been 15 (Grazulis, p. 722)	Tornado outbreak of April 29 – May 1, 1909
	Ogden/Bismarck, Illinois—Hedrick, Indiana	1922	April 17	13	40	F4		(Grazulis, p. 779)
	Longwood—Sanford, Florida	1998	February 23	13	36	F3		1998 Kissimmee tornado outbreak
	Gray—Milledgeville, Georgia	1875	March 20	13	30	F4	Death toll should be 14 as a child was still missing when the official damage survey was completed. That child was never found and presumed dead, but the official numbers were never updated.	March 1875 Southeast tornado outbreak
	Oxmoor (now Homewood)—Brock Gap—Leeds, Alabama	1884	February 19	13	30	F4	There may have been several more deaths but this was unconfirmed.	Enigma Tornado Outbreak, (Grazulis, p. 625)
	Drew County—Desha Counties, Arkansas	1929	April 21	13	7	F3		(Grazulis, p. 825)
	Gainesville, Georgia	1998	March 20	12	171	F3		1998 Gainesville-Stoneville tornado outbreak
	Jellico—Newcomb—Pruden, Tennessee—Cumberland Gap (KY)	1933	March 14	12	162	F4		March 1933 Nashville tornado outbreak, (Grazulis, p. 847)
	Florence—Brandon—Carthage—Weir, Mississippi	1992	November 21	12	122	F4		Tornado outbreak of November 21–23, 1992, (Grazulis, p. 1,342)
	Beaver Dam—Salemburg—Roseboro—Clinton, North Carolina	1984	March 28	12	101	F3		1984 Carolinas tornado outbreak
	Pine Lake, Alberta, Canada	2000	July 14	12	100	F3		Pine Lake tornado
	Rowena—Hatchel—Oplin, Texas	1922	April 8	12	90	F3		(Grazulis, p. 778)
	Monroe Center, Ohio—Albion/Cranesville, Pennsylvania	1985	May 31	12	82	F4		List of tornadoes in the 1985 United States-Canada tornado outbreak, (Grazulis, p. 1,268)
	Seney—Macedonia—Kingston—Pine Log, Georgia	1932	March 21	12	80	F3		1932 Deep South tornado outbreak
	Sherburn—Easton, Minnesota	1892	June 15	12	76	F5		1892 Southern Minnesota tornado
	Marathon County, Wisconsin	1898	May 18	12	75	F5		
	Leola—England—Carlisle—Des Arc—Cotton Plant, Arkansas	1916	December 26	12	72	F4		(Grazulis, p. 749)
	Nineveh—Darsey—Reynard, Texas	1935	February 8	12	70	F2		(Grazulis, p. 859)
	Swanburg—Roosevelt Lake—Hill City, Minnesota	1969	August 6	12	70	F4		Tornado outbreak of August 6, 1969, (Grazulis, p. 1,106)
	Elaine, Arkansas	1930	May 18	12	60	F3		(Grazulis, p. 835)
	Savoy—Mayview—St. Joseph—Alvin, Illinois	1942	March 16	12	60	F4		Tornado outbreak of March 16–17, 1942
	Askewville—Bertie County, North Carolina	2011	April 16	12	58	EF3		List of tornadoes in the tornado outbreak of April 14–16, 2011
	Austin, Texas (#2)	1922	May 4	12	50	F4	Newspapers later reported death toll of 13 with injured greater than 50. Several areas of Austin affected including Penn Field, St. Elmo, Oak Hill, Davis Hill, and Manchaca. (Grazulis, p. 780)	1922 Austin twin tornadoes
	Blountsville—Milledgeville, Georgia	1884	February 19	12	50	F3		Enigma tornado outbreak, (Grazulis, p. 625)
	Literberry—Philadelphia, Illinois	1883	May 18	12	50	F4		(Grazulis, p. 621)
	Orfordville—Hanover—Janesville—Milton, Wisconsin	1911	November 11	12	50	F4		Great Blue Norther of November 11, 1911
	Panama City, Panama	1992	July 15	12	50	F?	Numbers of injured were likely greater than 50	List of Central American Tornadoes
	Clovercroft—Nolensville—La Vergne—Thompson's Station, Tennessee	1900	November 20	12	44	F3	Death toll could be as high as 17 or even 22 because several people died from their injuries within a few days, but these were unconfirmed.	
	Dent—Crawford Counties, Missouri	1893	April 11	12	40	F4	Unincorporated communities like Conroy (a mining town), Dry Fork, and Jadwin were all affected.	(Grazulis, p. 660)
	Harris—Newtown, Missouri	1899	April 27	12	40	F4		(Grazulis, p. 686)
	Mer Rouge, Louisiana	1926	November 25	12	38	F3		(Grazulis, p. 805)
	Athens—University of Georgia—Colbert—Comer—Paoli, Georgia	1932	March 22	12	35	F3		1932 Deep South tornado outbreak
	Deshler—Carleton—Geneva, Nebraska	1908	June 5	12	30	F5		(Grazulis, p. 717)
	Iron City—Heflin—Edwardsville, Alabama	1899	March 18	12	30	F4		(Grazulis, p. 686)
	Slocomb—Collegeville, Arkansas	1927	March 17	12	27	F3		(Grazulis, p. 806)
	Egypt—Stanford—Pauls Switch or Lanieve, Arkansas	1927	May 9	12	8	F3		Tornado outbreak of May 1927, (Grazulis, p. 810)

== 10–11 fatalities ==
Rank	Affected Communities	Year	Month & Day	Fatalities	Injuries	F or EF	Notes	Other References
	Largo—Clearwater—Carrollwood—Temple Terrace—Galloway—Gibsonia—Loughman, Florida	1966	April 4	11	350	F4		Tornado outbreak of April 4–5, 1966, (Grazulis, p. 1,079)
	Hanover College—Madison, Indiana	1974	April 3	11	300	F4	Grazulis reported 190 injuries (Grazulis, p. 1,154)	List of tornadoes in the 1974 Super Outbreak
	Crowell, Texas	1942	April 28	11	250	F4		
	Anchor Bay (Michigan)	1964	May 8	11	224	F4		(Grazulis, p. 1,055)
	Gorham—Sand Ridge—Murphysboro—Plumfield, Illinois	1957	December 18	11	200	F4		Tornado outbreak sequence of December 18–20, 1957, (Grazulis, p. 1,013)
	Hoxie—Walnut Ridge, Arkansas	1927	May 9	11	200	F4		Tornado outbreak of May 1927, (Grazulis, p. 809)
	Camilla, Georgia	2000	February 13	11	175	F3		Tornado outbreak of February 13–14, 2000
	Tuscaloosa, Alabama	2000	December 16	11	144	F4		Tornado outbreak of December 16, 2000
	Brownsville (Sweet Springs), Missouri	1882	April 18	11	100	F3		(Grazulis, p. 615)
	Georgetown—Harrisville—Morton, Mississippi	1883	April 22	11	100	F3		(Grazulis, p. 617)
	Mankato—Green Gables, Minnesota	1946	August 17	11	100	F4		(Grazulis, p. 925)
	San Pedro, Misiones, Argentina	2009	September 7	11	100	EF4		List of tornadoes in Argentina
	Jackson, Tennessee	2003	May 4	11	86	F4		List of tornadoes in the May 2003 tornado outbreak sequence
	Murphysboro—Bush—Herrin, Illinois	1912	April 21	11	83	F4		Tornado outbreak of April 20–22, 1912, (Grazulis, p. 732)
	Melissa, Texas	1921	April 13	11	80	F4		(Grazulis, p. 772)
	Great Bend, Kansas	1915	November 10	11	75	F4		(Grazulis, p. 744)
	Arthur City, Texas—Fort Towson, Oklahoma	1927	April 18	11	72	F4		(Grazulis, p. 808)
	Lockett/Vernon, Texas—Davidson, Oklahoma	1979	April 10	11	67	F4		1979 Red River Valley tornado outbreak, (Grazulis, p. 1,207)
	Apex, Missouri—Hardin/Carrollton/Wrights/Athensville/Loami/Springfield, Illinois	1927	April 19	11	63	F4		(Grazulis, p. 808)
	Greensburg, Kansas	2007	May 4	11	63	EF5		2007 Greensburg tornado
	York—Livingston, Alabama	1945	February 12	11	63	F4		Tornado outbreak of February 12, 1945, (Grazulis, p. 918)
	La Cygne, Kansas—Merwin—Bates County, Missouri	1912	June 15	11	60	F4		(Grazulis, p. 735)
	Walterboro, South Carolina	1879	April 16	11	60	F3	Death toll could be as high as 16 as five people may have died later from their injuries.	(Grazulis, p. 598)
	Clinton, Kentucky	1890	January 12	11	53	F4		(Grazulis, p. 648)
	Augusta, Georgia	1804	April 4	11	50	F?		(Grazulis, p. 554)
	Bluffton, Alabama—Cave Spring, Georgia	1908	April 24	11	50	F4		1908 Dixie tornado outbreak, (Grazulis, p. 714)
	Browder—Drakesboro, Kentucky	1942	March 16	11	50	F3		Tornado outbreak of March 16–17, 1942
	Jacksonville, Illinois	1859	May 26	11	50	F?		(Grazulis, p. 565)
	Round Prairie—Dawson—Buffalo—Kenney, Illinois	1883	May 18	11	50	F4		(Grazulis, p. 620)
	Barney—Adel—Nashville, Georgia	2017	January 22	11	45	EF3		Tornado outbreak of January 21–23, 2017
	Hamilton—Shiloh, Georgia	1875	March 20	11	40	F4	Possibly as many as 15 deaths as many plantations/farms in the area were flattened. (Grazulis, p. 581)	March 1875 Southeast tornado outbreak
	Oakdale—Tomah, Wisconsin	1907	July 3	11	40	F4		
	Shamrock—Drumright, Oklahoma	1922	November 4	11	40	F4		(Grazulis, p. 782)
	Still Pond—Kent County, Maryland	1888	August 21	11	40	F2		(Grazulis, p. 645)
	Baton Rouge, Louisiana	1891	July 6	11	38	F2		(Grazulis, p. 655)
	Perry—Williamstown, Kansas	1893	June 21	11	30	F4		(Grazulis, p. 664)
	Vasa/Burnside Township, Minnesota—Diamond Bluff, Wisconsin	1879	July 2	11	30	F4		(Grazulis, p. 604)
	Dunkirk—Carey, Ohio	1886	May 14	11	25	F3		(Grazulis, p. 640)
	Herman, Nebraska	1899	June 13	11	25	F4		(Grazulis, p. 640)
	Marks, Mississippi	1926	November 26	11	22	F3		(Grazulis, p. 805)
	Clifton—Morganville—Palmer, Kansas	1896	April 25	11	20	F4	Grazulis reported 9 deaths and 20 injuries, but also stated that 11 people may have died, all of them in Clay County.	(Grazulis, p. 672)
	Golden—Viola, Missouri	1909	April 29	11	18	F4		Tornado outbreak of April 29 – May 1, 1909, (Grazulis, p. 720)
	Slidell—Sanger, Texas	1909	March 23	11	10	F2	Grazulis reported 10 deaths and 8 injuries (Grazulis, p. 719)	
	Ivy, Virginia	1959	September 30	11	9	F3		(Grazulis, p. 1,023)
	Owens—Phillips (mining communities), Alabama	1924	May 27	11	7	F3		(Grazulis, p. 789)
	Arcadia (Hays Creek), Nebraska	1953	June 7	11	5	F4		Flint-Worcester tornado outbreak sequence, (Grazulis, p. 973)
	Charleston, South Carolina	1811	September 10	11		F?	”Hurricane-spawned tornado” moved directly through the middle of the city.	(Grazulis, p. 554)
	Fray Marcos, Florida Department, Uruguay	1970	April 21	11		F4	”several” injuries	List of tornadoes in Uruguay
	New Pekin—Henryville—Marysville—Chelsea, Indiana	2012	March 2	11		EF4		Tornado outbreak of March 2–3, 2012
	Dallas County, Texas	2015	December 26	10	468	EF4		2015 Garland tornado
	Medicine Lodge—Kingman—Hutchinson—McPherson, Kansas	1927	May 7	10	300	F5		Tornado outbreak of May 1927, (Grazulis, p. 808)
	Dallas, Texas	1957	April 2	10	216	F3		Tornado outbreak sequence of April 2–5, 1957, (Grazulis, p. 1,000)
	Hollow, Oklahoma—Chetopa/Faulkner/Columbus, Kansas	1938	March 30	10	200	F4		(Grazulis, p. 875)
	Nacogdoches, Texas	1946	January 4	10	200	F4		Tornado outbreak of January 4–6, 1946, (Grazulis, p. 922)
	Carterville—Crainville—Marion, Illinois	1982	May 29	10	181	F4		Marion, Illinois, tornado outbreak, (Grazulis, p. 1,242)
	Paris—Reno—Blossom, Texas	1982	April 2	10	170	F4		Tornado outbreak of April 2–3, 1982, (Grazulis, p. 1,236)
	Tallulah, Louisiana—Yazoo City/Durant, Mississippi	2010	April 24	10	162	EF4		2010 Yazoo City tornado
	Dothan—Cowarts—Webb, Alabama	1918	January 11	10	120	F3		(Grazulis, p. 757)
	Clinton County, Kentucky	1974	April 3	10	113	F4		List of tornadoes in the 1974 Super Outbreak
	West Liberty, Kentucky—Dunlow/Cove Gap, West Virginia	2012	March 2	10	112	EF3		Tornado outbreak of March 2–3, 2012
	Fargo, North Dakota	1957	June 20	10	103	F5	Unofficial death toll was 12 based on two people who later died from their injuries (Grazulis, p. 1,009)	Fargo tornado
	Monticello, Mississippi	1882	April 22	10	100	F4		(Grazulis, p. 615)
	Success—Licking—Eye—Mineral Point, Missouri	1917	May 30	10	100	F4		Tornado outbreak sequence of May 25 – June 1, 1917, (Grazulis, p. 753)
	Louisville, Mississippi	2014	April 28	10	84	EF4		List of tornadoes in the tornado outbreak of April 27–30, 2014
	Koontz Lake—LaPaz—Lakeville—Wyatt, Indiana	1965	April 11	10	82	F3		List of tornadoes in the 1965 Palm Sunday tornado outbreak, (Grazulis, p. 1,063)
	Arroyo Seco, Santa Fe, Argentina	1891	November 13	10	80	F4		List of tornadoes in Argentina
	Parrott—Plains—Americus, Georgia	1883	April 22	10	80	F4		(Grazulis, p. 618)
	Booneville—Paris—Minnow Creek—Clarksville, Arkansas	1945	April 12	10	70	F4		Tornado outbreak of April 1945, (Grazulis, p. 919)
	Tamo—New Hope Church	1926	November 25	10	66	F3	All of the fatalities and 40 of the injuries resulted from the tornado hitting a wedding party as they were leaving the church. The church itself was destroyed and all that remains is the cemetery on the same property.	(Grazulis, p. 804)
	Elysian Fields, Texas—Flournoy/Shreveport, Louisiana	1940	March 12	10	60	F3		(Grazulis, p. 889)
	Paragould, Arkansas—Bakerville/Bragg City/Wardell/Kennett, Missouri	1938	March 15	10	60	F4		(Grazulis, p. 874)
	Springfield—Buffalo Hart—Cornland—Chestnut—Mount Pulaski—Riverton, Illinois	1927	April 19	10	60	F4		(Grazulis, p. 808)
	Belleville—O’Fallon, Illinois	1938	March 15	10	52	F4	At least 52 injuries	(Grazulis, p. 874)
	Cookeville—Putnam County, Tennessee	1974	April 3	10	51	F4	An 11th person later died from their injuries (Grazulis, p. 1,161)	List of tornadoes in the 1974 Super Outbreak
	Commerce—Hernando, Mississippi	1881	April 12	10	50	F3		(Grazulis, p. 611)
	Gowan (or Gowen), Oklahoma	1922	March 13	10	50	F2	At least 23 people were seriously injured and some may have later died from their injuries.	(Grazulis, p. 777)
	Middleton—McNairy—Henderson, Tennessee	1913	March 13	10	50	F4		(Grazulis, p. 736)
	Newburg—La Vergne, Tennessee	1877	April 18	10	50	F4		(Grazulis, p. 588)
	Hot Springs, Arkansas	1915	November 15	10	45	F4		(Grazulis, p. 745)
	Battle Creek—Eureka Township—Hayes Township—Storm Lake, Iowa	1878	April 21	10	40	F4		(Grazulis, p. 594)
	Centerville—Leiper's Fork, Tennessee	1909	April 29	10	40	F3		Tornado outbreak of April 29 – May 1, 1909, (Grazulis, p. 721)
	Chipley/Pine Mountain—Harris—Greenville, Georgia	1908	April 25	10	40	F3		1908 Dixie tornado outbreak, (Grazulis, p. 714)
	Chipley/Pine Mountain, Georgia	1924	April 30	10	35	F3		April 1924 tornado outbreak, (Grazulis, p. 788)
	Bay Springs—Increase, Mississippi	1924	May 26	10	30	F3		(Grazulis, p. 788)
	Laneville—Hale County—Scott Station, Alabama	1932	March 21	10	30	F3	As many as 20 deaths in Laneville alone, poorly documented, unconfirmed (Grazulis, p. 843)	1932 Deep South tornado outbreak
	Oasis—Melva—Bradleyville, Missouri	1920	March 11	10	30	F4	Nine children were killed by this tornado, some reports suggest 11 total fatalities (see Melva, Missouri page)	(Grazulis, p. 767)
	Unionville—Dyersburg—Newbern, Tennessee	1952	March 21	10	30	F3	Grazulis reported nine deaths and 50 injuries (Grazulis, p. 963)	Tornado outbreak of March 21–22, 1952
	Eaton, Tennessee	1932	January 14	10	28	F4		(Grazulis, p. 842)
	Wetumka—Lenna, Oklahoma	1948	March 25	10	25	F4	Occurred on the same day as the second of the 1948 Tinker Air Force Base tornadoes	(Grazulis, p. 935)
	Gans, Oklahoma	1957	January 22	10	21	F4		(Grazulis, p. 999
	Manes—Hazleton—Lenox—Anutt, Missouri	1917	May 30	10	20	F4		Tornado outbreak sequence of May 25 – June 1, 1917, (Grazulis, p. 753)
	Troy—Durango, Texas	1892	May 31	10	20	F4		(Grazulis, p. 658)
	Alpha—Harkey Valley, Arkansas	1920	April 19	10	10	F3		April 1920 tornado outbreak, (Grazulis, p. 769)
	Biwabik, Minnesota	1900	October 6	10	8	F3		(Grazulis, p. 692)
	Boyd County, Nebraska	1901	June 21	10	8	F4		(Grazulis, p. 694)
	Thurman, Colorado	1924	August 10	10	8	F4	All ten people died when the house in which they were having dinner was destroyed; nine of them were children (Grazulis, p. 792) under the age of 15. An 11th person died from his injuries four months later.	
	Harpersville, Alabama	1964	January 24	10	6	F4		(Grazulis, p. 1,049)
	Codell—Alton—Bloomington, Kansas	1918	May 20	10		F4	This town was struck by progressively stronger tornado on the same day, three years in a row (1916, 1917, and 1918). Grazulis reported nine deaths and 65 injuries.	(Grazulis, p. 759)

== Significant tornadoes with fewer than ten fatalities ==
Rank	Affected Communities	Year	Month & Day	Fatalities	Injuries	F or EF	Notes	Other References
	Barrie, Ontario, Canada	1985	May 31	8	155	F4	One of the deadliest and costliest tornadoes in Canadian history. The number of casualties was most likely higher.	1985 Barrie tornado
	Bouctouche, New Brunswick	1879	August 6	8		F3	Anywhere between 5 and 8 fatalities have been reported, “many” others were injured. This is the easternmost strong tornado ever to occur in North America.	1879 Bouctouche tornado
	Havana, Cuba	2019	January 27	8	190	EF4		2019 Havana tornado
	Pozo del Tigre, Formosa Province, Argentina	2010	October 21	6	116	F?		Tornadoes of 2010
	Maravilha, Santa Catarina, Brazil	1984	October 9	5	400	F?		List of tornadoes in Brazil
	Guernica, Buenos Aires, Argentina	2001	January 10	5	250	F3	This was the second time in 16 days that this town took a direct hit from a strong (F3) tornado. A total of six people died and greater than 300 were injured between both events.	List of tornadoes in Argentina
	Córdoba, Argentina	2003	December 26	5	90	F3	This tornado was on the ground for 24 minutes and caused an enormous amount of damage throughout the province. It is rumored to be the "longest-lasting tornado" in South American history.	List of tornadoes in Argentina
	Freeport, Bahamas	2010	March 29	3	4	F?	An extremely rare tornado toppled a crane at a construction site which resulted in all of the above fatalities and injuries.	Tornado outbreak of March 28–29, 2010
	Hamilton—Harrington Sound, Bermuda	1953	April 5	1		F?	Four waterspouts made landfall near Hamilton. “Several” injuries were confirmed as well.	Easter tornadoes of 1953

== Bibliography ==
- Grazulis, Thomas (1993). Significant Tornadoes 1680–1991. St. Johnsbury, Vermont: The Tornado Project of Environmental Films. ISBN 1-879362-03-1.
- Grazulis, Thomas (1997). Significant Tornadoes Update, 1992–1995. St. Johnsbury, Vermont: The Tornado Project of Environmental Films. ISBN 1-879362-04-X.

== See also ==
- Ted Fujita, creator of the original Fujita Scale (used in the United States from 1971 to 2007)
- Thomas P. Grazulis, meteorologist and author of "Significant Tornadoes"
- List of natural disasters by death toll
- List of tornadoes and tornado outbreaks
  - List of Canadian tornadoes and tornado outbreaks (before 2001)
  - List of Canadian tornadoes and tornado outbreaks (since 2001)
  - List of North American tornadoes and tornado outbreaks
  - List of Southern Hemisphere tornadoes and tornado outbreaks
- List of costliest tornadoes in the Americas
- List of F5 and EF5 tornadoes
- List of F4 and EF4 tornadoes
- Tornado climatology
- Tornado records
