= Cundiff =

Cundiff may refer to:

- Cundiff, Kentucky
- Cundiff, Texas

== People with the name Cundiff ==
- Billy Cundiff
- Frederick Cundiff

== See also ==
- Rusty Cundieff
