= Nashville tornado =

Nashville tornado may refer to:

- 1933 Nashville tornado – An F3 tornado that struck Nashville early into its lifespan
- 1998 Nashville tornado – A strong F3 tornado that struck downtown Nashville in 1998
- 2020 Nashville tornado – A strong EF3 tornado that severely damaged parts of Nashville in 2020
