= 1944 Shinnston tornado =

Destructive F4 tornado in 1944

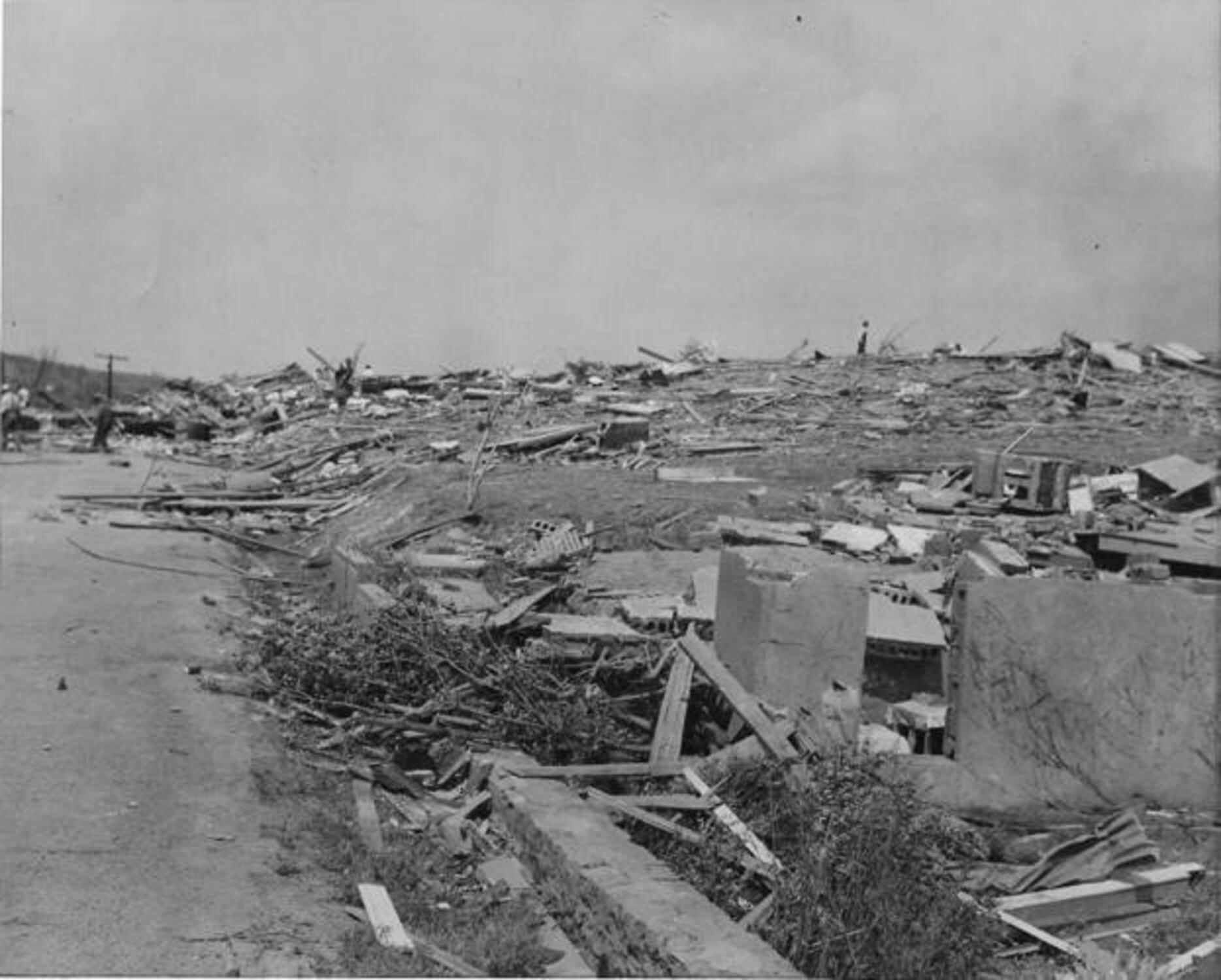
- Homes in the Pleasant Hill neighborhood wiped out by the tornado.

Meteorological history
- Formed: June 23, 1944, ~8:30 p.m. EDT (UTC–04:00)
- Dissipated: June 23, 1944, ~9:00 p.m. EDT (UTC–04:00)
- Duration: ~2 hours (Note: The time of formation being at 8:30 p.m. is based on its appearance in Wyatt, which may have been around 20 miles (32 km) away from the actual starting point. It is unclear where the dissipation time of 9:00 p.m. is based on although it is reported in multiple sources.)

F4 equiv. tornado
- Highest winds: ≥207 mph (333 km/h)

Overall effects
- Fatalities: 100+ (Deadliest tornado in West Virginia history)
- Injuries: 381+
- Damage: $5.5 million (1944 USD)
- Areas affected: Northern West Virginia
- Part of the 1944 Appalachians tornado outbreak

In the evening of June 23, 1944, a powerful F4 tornado devastated northern West Virginia, particularly the town of Shinnston. The tornado killed at least 100 people and injured hundreds more. (Note: Some sources indicate that 103 rather than 100 people died in this tornado. Injury counts are even more inconsistent: there were at least 381 injuries although some sources indicate over 800 occurred.)

This tornado was the deadliest in West Virginia history and at least the 14th deadliest in US history. (Note: Assumes 100 fatalities.) It is the only tornado to produce violent damage in the state's history.

== Background ==
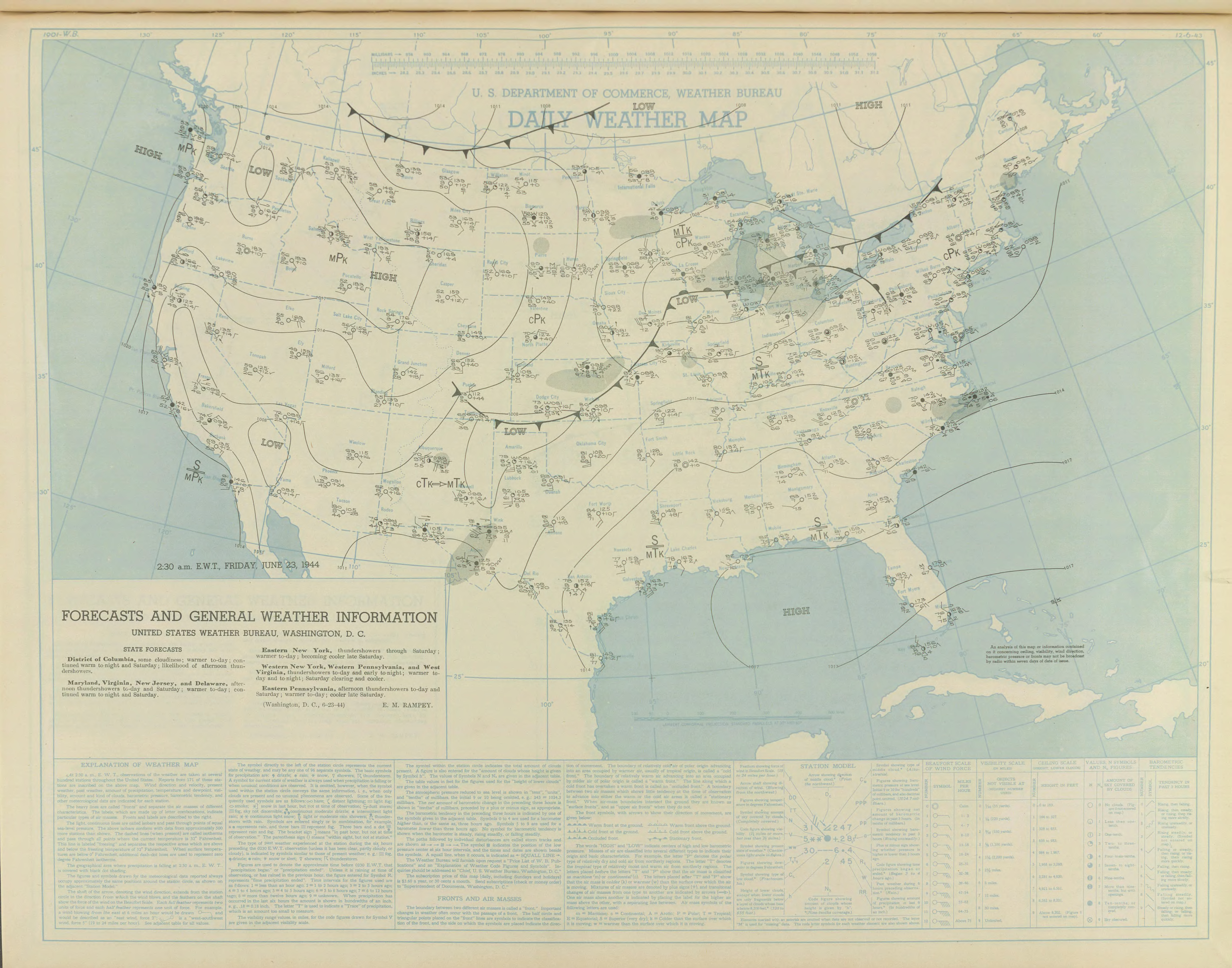
A weather map with data from the morning of June 23, 1944.

At the time of the tornado, the use of the word "tornado" in weather forecasts was discouraged to prevent public panic. Weather news was banned at the time as it was seen as a threat during World War II. This contributed to a lack of public tornado awareness and the prevalence of tornado myths such as the belief that tornadoes could not occur in mountainous regions like Appalachia. On the day of the tornado, few people even knew what a tornado was or that one could even occur in the area.

The US Weather Bureau forecasted thunderstorms in the daytime and evening; firsthand accounts describe the weather as being intermittently stormy all day, but that the sun had come out and it was warm and "eerily silent" before the tornado struck.

== Tornado summary ==
The exact time and location where the tornado began is unknown, but it may have begun as far northwest as Pine Grove in Wetzel County, where one person was killed. Some say that the tornado occurred at "just past 8 o'clock". At around 8:30 p.m. EDT, the tornado touched down in Marion County, to the northwest of Wyatt, a small community to the northwest of Shinnston. From there, it quickly intensified as it moved to the southeast at 30-40 mph, killing three people and destroying four homes in Joetown.

Witnesses from in and around Shinnston describe seeing a large black funnel descend from a dark cloud and hearing a sound like a freight train approaching. Many believed there was a coal mine explosion or that the Germans were bombing the city, thinking it would be impossible for a tornado to cross the Appalachian Mountains. But by the time the tornado was visible, many had too little time to take shelter.

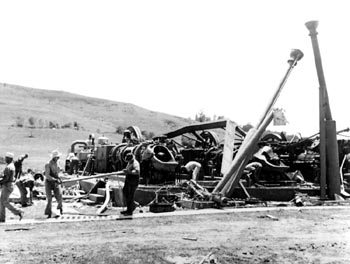
Part of a natural gas plant damaged by the tornado in the Shinnston area.

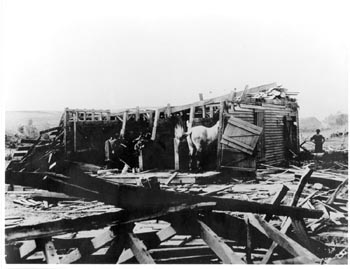
A barn was blown away by the tornado, leaving horses in the stable uninjured.

In the next 10 miles (16 km), the tornado would move into Harrison County, growing to 1 mile (1.6 km) wide (Note: Grazulis claims that the tornado grew to 1 mile (1.6 km) wide, but also states that the maximum width of the tornado was just 300 yards (270 m). Other sources put the width at up to 500 yards (460 m) or even just 1,000 feet (300 m).) and killing 72 people. Many were killed in the farm communities of Peora and Wyatt to the northwest of Shinnston. (Note: Grazulis reports that Peora and Wyatt are to the southeast of Shinnston, but in reality they are to the northwest of Shinnston.) The tornado then devastated Shinnston, particularly the "Pleasant Hill" part of town; this is where the worst damage occurred as 30 were killed and 50 houses were wiped clean. Homes in Pleasant Hill were leveled and their debris were blown into the West Fork River. Witnesses report that the tornado sucked out so much water from the river that the river bed was visible. Reports tell that debris was found in cities and rivers tens or hundreds of miles away, including papers, valuables, and even bodies. In the Shinnston area, trees were debarked, a steel radio tower was split in half, vehicles were moved almost 100 feet (30 m) from their original positions, and a natural gas plant was leveled. Streetcar tracks were twisted and households appliances like kitchen stoves and refrigerators were thrown for miles. Many strange occurrences were reported after the tornado, including a barn being blown away with the horses inside being uninjured, a pig pen disappearing but leaving the pigs, and garages being carried away while the cars inside were left undamaged. Additionally, 10 people within a house were apparently left standing on the floor after the tornado had blown away the house around them. Some swear to have seen straw being blown through concrete walls.

In Taylor County, the tornado killed nine people, mostly in Simpson, including seven from one family. Nine more people were killed in Barbour County, in and around Meadowville, Nestorville, and north of Philippi. Seven were killed near Montrose in Randolph County. Finally, the tornado dissipated north of Alpena in southern Randolph County on the slopes of Cheat Mountain.

Strong hail and windstorms were experienced in and around the affected areas, with hail "larger than hen eggs" being reported.

== Aftermath ==
In the hills of West Virginia, near the end of World War II,
It was a lazy summer evening, then the darkness grew,
And there ain’t been nothing like it and may never be again,
When the Shinnston Tor-na-do came down and took our friends.
They say it was north of Shinnston when it first came to the ground,
And it tore and broke in pieces every obstacle it found
Just like the day of judgement, some were taken, some were spared
We all felt natures fury, we were helpless, tired, and scared.
Where do you run to when the noon is black as night
And you hear a rumbling freight train, but there isn’t one in sight
And you feel your body rising, though you say it can’t be so
Well I’m telling you it happened in the Shinnston Tor-na-do.
Can you feel your body rising? Does the thought of dying make you so afraid?
Do you doubt the power of God when the storm surrounds you?
Get on your knees and pray that you’ll be saved.

— Shinnston Tornado by the Scott Brothers

In total, this tornado caused about $5.5 million (1944 USD) in damages over its 65 miles (100 km) path across Wetzel, Marion, Harrison, Taylor, Barbour, Tucker, and Randolph counties, West Virginia. Over 100 people were killed and hundreds more were injured. In Shinnston alone, 78 were killed and devastating damage was inflicted as well-built homes were leveled and many structures were blown away entirely.

The response to the tornado was greatly aided by wartime preparations: the civil defense plan prepared in case the Germans bombed the city was utilized. Organizations like the National Guard, American Red Cross, and the Boy and Girl Scouts provided assistance, organizing rescue operations and supporting the community. Immediately, makeshift morgues, shelters, and aid stations were set up in churches, schools, and businesses. Citizens drove the injured to hospitals in Clarksburg and Fairmont. Doctors, nurses, and pharmacists who came in from nearby areas had to care for patients by candle and flashlight due to major blackouts.

From there, attention turned to the miles of destroyed power and phone lines that prevented people from reaching help if they were not in the immediate area of first responders. Generators were provided to the hospitals and the telephone company by a traveling circus and a local coal company. Additionally, prisoners were sent from nearby areas to help dig graves.

This tornado helped disprove the myth that tornadoes do not occur over mountainous terrain. People reportedly flocked to Shinnston from far away to observe the "indescribable havoc" caused by the tornado or to search for loved ones.

A song called "Shinnston Tornado" was sung by the Scott Brothers, and is kept by the Bice-Ferguson Memorial Museum in Shinnston. A historical marker was erected in 2016 to commemorate the disaster.
