= Tornado outbreak sequence of May 4–10, 1933 =

Weather event in the United States

Coordinates: 36.340°N 85.278°W

Early-May 1933 tornado outbreak sequence
Meteorological history
- Duration: May 4–10, 1933

Tornado outbreak
- Tornadoes: ≥ 33
- Max. rating: F4 tornado
- Duration: 8 days

Overall effects
- Fatalities: 128
- Areas affected: Midwestern United States, Southeastern United States
- Part of the tornadoes and tornado outbreaks of 1933

From May 4–10, 1933, a tornado outbreak sequence produced at least 33 tornadoes. Among them was the Beaty Swamp tornado, a violent F4 that struck shortly after midnight CST on May 11, 1933, in Overton County, Tennessee, killing 35 people, injuring 150 others, and devastating the unincorporated communities of Beatty Swamps and Bethsaida. The storm was the second-deadliest tornado in the history of Middle Tennessee, even though it struck a sparsely populated, rural area. The community of Beatty Swamps ceased to exist and does not appear on any current maps. The only landmark that alludes to the former community is Beaty Swamp Road, which intersects Highway 111 in the northeast corner of Overton County. The severe weather event that generated the tornado also produced others, including long-tracked, intense tornadoes or tornado families that devastated portions of Alabama, South Carolina, and Kentucky, killing a combined total of 76 people. (Note: An outbreak is generally defined as a group of at least six tornadoes (the number sometimes varies slightly according to local climatology) with no more than a six-hour gap between individual tornadoes. An outbreak sequence, prior to (after) the start of modern records in 1950, is defined as a period of no more than two (one) consecutive days without at least one significant (F2 or stronger) tornado.) (Note: The Fujita scale was devised under the aegis of scientist T. Theodore Fujita in the early 1970s. Prior to the advent of the scale in 1971, tornadoes in the United States were officially unrated. While the Fujita scale has been superseded by the Enhanced Fujita scale in the U.S. since February 1, 2007, Canada used the old scale until April 1, 2013; nations elsewhere, like the United Kingdom, apply other classifications such as the TORRO scale.) (Note: Historically, the number of tornadoes globally and in the United States was and is likely underrepresented: research by Grazulis on annual tornado activity suggests that, as of 2001, only 53% of yearly U.S. tornadoes were officially recorded. Documentation of tornadoes outside the United States was historically less exhaustive, owing to the lack of monitors in many nations and, in some cases, to internal political controls on public information. Most countries only recorded tornadoes that produced severe damage or loss of life. Significant low biases in U.S. tornado counts likely occurred through the early 1990s, when advanced NEXRAD was first installed and the National Weather Service began comprehensively verifying tornado occurrences.)

== Confirmed tornadoes ==
Confirmed tornadoes by Fujita rating
FU	F0	F1	F2	F3	F4	F5	Total
6	?	?	16	8	3	0	≥ 33

=== May 4 event ===
Confirmed tornadoes – Thursday, May 4, 1933 (Note: All dates are based on the local time zone where the tornado touched down; however, all times are in Coordinated Universal Time and dates are split at midnight CST/CDT for consistency.) (Note: Prior to 1994, only the average widths of tornado paths were officially listed.)
F#	Location	County / Parish	State	Time (UTC)	Path length	Max. width	Summary
F2	Calico Rock	Izard	AR	21:00–?	6 miles (9.7 km)	50 yards (46 m)	Tornado destroyed a few barns. Losses totaled $500.
FU	Eudora	Chicot	AR	22:00–?	3 miles (4.8 km)	Unknown	Large tornado destroyed several structures. Losses totaled $50,000.
F2	Bosco	Ouachita	LA	23:00–?	Unknown	Unknown	Tornado struck a plantation, unroofing the main residence. Six tenant homes were destroyed as well. Four people were injured and losses totaled $25,000.
F3	E of Tallulah	Madison	LA	00:30–?	10 miles (16 km)	500 yards (460 m)	1 death – Tornado destroyed both large and small homes. 15 people were injured and losses totaled $35,000.
F2	Valley Park	Issaquena, Sharkey	MS	02:00–?	5 miles (8.0 km)	50 yards (46 m)	Tornado destroyed a church and four homes.

=== May 5 event ===
Confirmed tornadoes – Friday, May 5, 1933
F#	Location	County / Parish	State	Time (UTC)	Path length	Max. width	Summary
F3	E of Edna to Demopolis	Choctaw, Sumter, Marengo	AL	06:20–?	35 miles (56 km)	400 yards (370 m)	4 deaths – Tornado destroyed 50 homes as it passed through Demopolis, rendering 200 people homeless. 27 people were injured and losses totaled $60,000.
F4	S of Brent to Helena	Bibb, Shelby	AL	08:30–?	35 miles (56 km)	500 yards (460 m)	21 deaths – Tornado obliterated small homes near Centerville and Coalmont. 14 of the fatalities occurred in Helena, along with 150 injuries, as the town was devastated. In all, 200 people were injured and losses totaled $250,000.
FU	Unknown	Jefferson	AL	09:00–?	Unknown	100 yards (91 m)	One person was injured and losses totaled $4,000.
F3	Northern Anderson to Belton to Barksdale	Anderson, Greenville, Laurens	SC	19:30–?	45 miles (72 km)	300 yards (270 m)	19 deaths – Tornado struck mills in Belton, destroying poorly built homes nearby. Other homes were destroyed in Greenville County. 100 people were injured and losses totaled $350,000. Most of the damages were to mills.

=== May 6 event ===
Confirmed tornadoes – Saturday, May 6, 1933
F#	Location	County / Parish	State	Time (UTC)	Path length	Max. width	Summary
F2	W of Starkville	Oktibbeha	MS	07:30–?	Unknown	Unknown	One home was destroyed. Three people were injured and losses totaled $3,000.
F2	Unknown	Lee	MS	07:30–?	Unknown	Unknown	Three small homes were destroyed. Five people were injured and losses totaled $6,000.

=== May 7 event ===
Confirmed tornadoes – Sunday, May 7, 1933
F#	Location	County / Parish	State	Time (UTC)	Path length	Max. width	Summary
F2	S of Remsen to SE of Alton	Plymouth, Sioux	IA	19:45–?	12 miles (19 km)	Unknown	Tornado struck seven farmsteads, three of which lost their barns. One person was injured and losses totaled $20,000.
F2	NE of Searcy	White	AR	21:30–?	Unknown	Unknown	Short-lived tornado, attended by hail, destroyed barns.
F2	N of Harrisburg to Trumann	Poinsett	AR	22:00–?	16 miles (26 km)	400 yards (370 m)	Tornado destroyed a school and nine homes in the Shady Grove community. At least two—possibly three—people were injured and losses totaled $25,000.
F2	W of Barnum	Webster	IA	22:00–?	Unknown	Unknown	Tornado destroyed a CBS-type barn.
F2	N of Bondurant to Maxwell	Polk, Story	IA	22:00–?	12 miles (19 km)	200 yards (180 m)	Widely visible tornado destroyed a couple of barns. A farmstead sustained the third tornado strike in its history. Losses totaled $3,000.
F2	Eagle Grove	Wright	IA	22:30–?	2 miles (3.2 km)	50 yards (46 m)	Tornado destroyed a chicken coop, a toolshed, and a barn. Losses totaled $5,000.
FU	Lu Verne	Humboldt, Kossuth	IA	23:30–?	Unknown	Unknown	Losses totaled $500.
F3	S of Covington to Charleston	Tipton	TN	23:45–?	15 miles (24 km)	300 yards (270 m)	6 deaths – Tornado destroyed or damaged approximately 105 agricultural outbuildings and homes. 20 people were injured and losses totaled $75,000.
F2	N of Somers to N of Barnum	Calhoun, Webster	IA	Unknown	12 miles (19 km)	Unknown	Tornado destroyed a few barns. Losses totaled $4,000.
F2	E of Fort Dodge	Webster	IA	Unknown	Unknown	Unknown	One barn was destroyed.

=== May 8 event ===
Confirmed tornadoes – Monday, May 8, 1933
F#	Location	County / Parish	State	Time (UTC)	Path length	Max. width	Summary
FU	Sycamore	Turner	GA	Unknown	Unknown	Unknown	Tornado reported.
FU	Cloverdale	Dade	GA	Unknown	Unknown	Unknown	Tornado reported.

=== May 9 event ===
Confirmed tornadoes – Tuesday, May 9, 1933
F#	Location	County / Parish	State	Time (UTC)	Path length	Max. width	Summary
F2	SW of Tipton	Tipton	IN	09:00–?	1 mile (1.6 km)	Unknown	A large barn was destroyed and its contents strewn.
F2	Lapel to Anderson	Madison	IN	09:30–?	4 miles (6.4 km)	Unknown	Tornado unroofed a home and damaged a factory. Damage to roofs and from seepage totaled $40,000.
FU	NE of Dayton	Montgomery	OH	11:37–?	3 miles (4.8 km)	880 yards (800 m)	Losses totaled $1 million.
F3	S of Versailles	Ripley	IN	22:15–?	7 miles (11 km)	200 yards (180 m)	Tornado destroyed several barns and four homes. Five people were injured.
F3	South Fork to Woods Ridge	Ohio	IN	22:40–?	5 miles (8.0 km)	400 yards (370 m)	Tornado destroyed three homes, one of which it nearly leveled, a seven-room structure that sustained borderline-F4 damage. Three people were injured.
F3	N of Dale to SW of Norris City	Hamilton, White	IL	00:00–?	8 miles (13 km)	200 yards (180 m)	2 deaths – Large tornado destroyed three homes, one of which was left with only a single wall. Three people were injured and losses totaled $5,000.
F4	SW of Tompkinsville to Southeastern Russell Springs	Monroe, Cumberland, Adair, Russell	KY	02:30–?	60 miles (97 km)	800 yards (730 m)	36 deaths — See section on this tornado
F2	Columbia	Metcalfe, Adair	KY	02:30–?	15 miles (24 km)	400 yards (370 m)	2 deaths – Five homes were destroyed and 12 others damaged in Columbia. 12 people were injured and losses totaled $45,000.
F3	N of Lebanon	Wilson	TN	04:30–?	5 miles (8.0 km)	200 yards (180 m)	2 deaths – Three homes were obliterated and scattered. Bodies were found 300 yd (900 ft) away. Other residents survived in underground storm shelters that had been built after tornadoes on March 14. Six people were injured and losses totaled $25,000.

=== May 10 event ===
Confirmed tornadoes – Wednesday, May 10, 1933
F#	Location	County / Parish	State	Time (UTC)	Path length	Max. width	Summary
F4	N of Livingston to Byrdstown	Overton, Pickett	TN	06:15–?	20 miles (32 km)	800 yards (730 m)	35 deaths — See section on this tornado

=== Tompkinsville–Sewell–Cundiff–Russell Springs, Kentucky ===
Tompkinsville–Sewell–Cundiff–Russell Springs, Kentucky
F4 tornado
- on the Fujita scale

Overall effects
- Casualties: ≥ 36 fatalities, ≥ 87 injuries
- Damage: $245,000 (1933 USD) $6.09 million (2025 USD)

A tornado family killed 16 people and destroyed 60 homes in Tompkinsville, striking the southern portion of the city and devastating African-American communities. Bodies were found 100 yd (91 m) away, and the swath of damage was 1/4 mi (0.40 km) wide. Farther northeast, the tornado killed two more people, at Sewell. Across Monroe County 50 injuries were reported. The tornado may have weakened as it headed northeastward, causing two injuries in Cumberland County and two more deaths near Cundiff in Adair County. Afterward, the tornado restrengthened and widened to 1 mi (1.6 km) as it neared Russell Springs. The tornado passed within 1/2 mi (0.80 km) of downtown Russell Springs, leveling 100 or more homes on the southeastern edge of town. At least 14 and possibly as many as 20 fatalities occurred in or near Russell Springs. Outside Russell Springs, chickens were reportedly left featherless. At least 87 people were injured and losses totaled $245,000. As many as 100 injuries may have occurred in Russell County alone. At that time, this tornado was the third-deadliest on record in the Commonwealth of Kentucky after the Louisville tornado of 1890, which took 76 lives, and the Fulton County-Bondurant tornado of 1917 when 65 people were killed. However, after 58 people were killed during the Western Kentucky tornado of 2021, this tornado would become the fourth-deadliest on record.

=== Beatty Swamps, Tennessee ===
Beatty Swamps, Tennessee
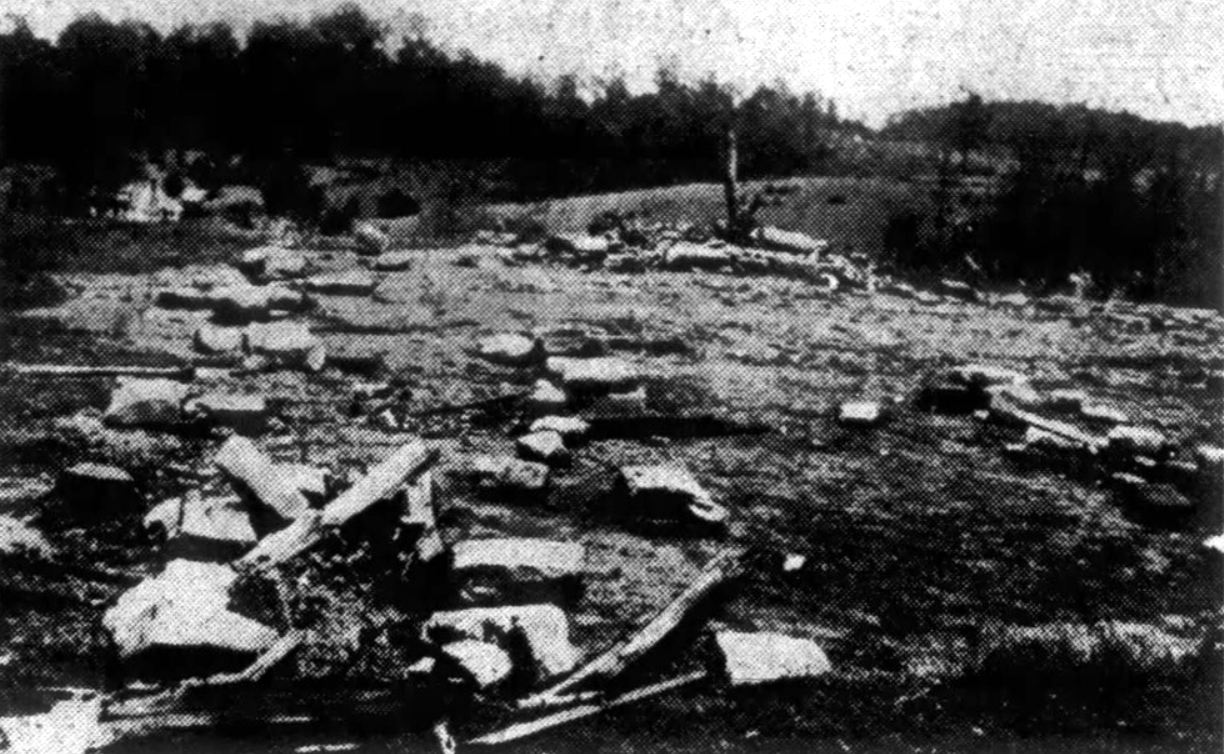
- The swept clean foundation of a large stone home after the tornado.

F4 tornado
- on the Fujita scale

Overall effects
- Casualties: 35 fatalities, 150 injuries
- Damage: $100,000 (1933 USD) $2.49 million (2025 USD)

Around midnight local time, a violent tornado touched down approximately 6 mi (9.7 km) north of Livingston and headed northeast, paralleling Big Eagle Creek and passing northwest of Bethsaida. The tornado subsequently struck the small settlement of Beatty Swamps, obliterating every home and causing 33 fatalities there, including an entire family of nine. Little debris was left in the vicinity, a reaper-binder was thrown 500 yd (1,500 ft), and cars were moved hundreds of feet. Almost everyone in Beatty Swamps was either injured or killed. After devastating Beatty Swamps, the tornado continued through Bethsaida and past West Fork before dissipating near Byrdstown. In Pickett County the tornado caused only minor damage to properties and trees. Estimates of the path length vary from 11 to 20 mi (18 to 32 km). Heavy rainfall, suggestive of a high-precipitation supercell, immediately preceded the tornado. Another violent tornado did not hit the area until April 3, 1974.

== See also ==
- List of North American tornadoes and tornado outbreaks

== Sources ==
- Brooks, Harold E. (April 2004). "On the Relationship of Tornado Path Length and Width to Intensity". Weather and Forecasting. 19 (2). Boston: American Meteorological Society: 310–19. Bibcode:2004WtFor..19..310B. doi:10.1175/1520-0434(2004)019<0310:OTROTP>2.0.CO;2.
- Cook, A. R.; Schaefer, J. T. (August 2008). Written at Norman, Oklahoma. "The Relation of El Niño–Southern Oscillation (ENSO) to Winter Tornado Outbreaks". Monthly Weather Review. 136 (8). Boston: American Meteorological Society: 3135. Bibcode:2008MWRv..136.3121C. doi:10.1175/2007MWR2171.1.
- Grazulis, Thomas P. (July 1993). Significant Tornadoes 1680–1991: A Chronology and Analysis of Events. St. Johnsbury, Vermont: The Tornado Project of Environmental Films. ISBN 1-879362-03-1.
- Grazulis, Thomas P. (2001a). The Tornado: Nature's Ultimate Windstorm. Norman: University of Oklahoma Press. ISBN 978-0-8061-3538-0.
- Grazulis, Thomas P. (2001b). F5-F6 Tornadoes. St. Johnsbury, Vermont: The Tornado Project of Environmental Films.
- U.S. Weather Bureau (May 1933). "Severe local storms, May 1933". Monthly Weather Review. 61 (5). Boston: American Meteorological Society: 154–6. Bibcode:1933MWRv...61..154.. doi:10.1175/1520-0493(1933)61<154:SLSM>2.0.CO;2.
