= Pozo del Tigre =

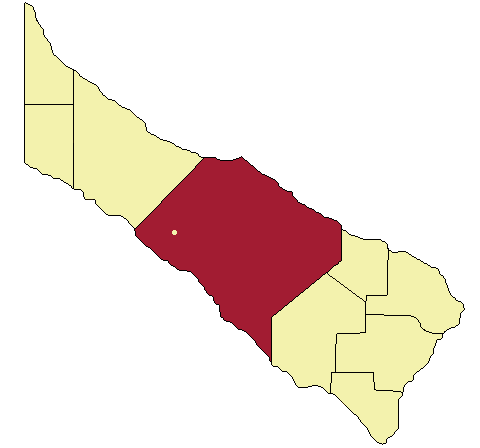
- Coordinates: 24°54′S 60°19′W
- Country: Argentina
- Province: Formosa Province
- Department: Patiño
- Municipality: Pozo del Tigre
- Established: 22 September 1905

Government
  - Mayor: Andres De Yong

Population (2001)
  - Total: 3,948
- Time zone: UTC−3 (ART)
- Climate: Cfa

Pozo del Tigre is a settlement in northern Argentina. It is located in Formosa Province, 1,300 km from the capital city, Buenos Aires.

== Population ==
The settlement had 3,948 inhabitants at the 2001 census, representing a 58.7% increase over the 2,487 inhabitants recorded in the 1991 census.

== 2010 tornado ==
On October 21, 2010, Pozo del Tigre was devastated by a tornado. Six people died and 110 were injured.
