= Tomato, Arkansas =

- Unincorporated community
- Location within Arkansas Location within the United States
- Coordinates: 35°50′37″N 89°44′28″W
- Country: United States
- State: Arkansas
- County: Mississippi
- Elevation: 256 ft (78 m)
- Time zone: UTC-6 (Central (CST))
  - Summer (DST): UTC-5 (CDT)
- ZIP code: 72381
- Area code: 870
- GNIS feature ID: 78571

Tomato is an unincorporated community in Mississippi County, Arkansas, United States. Tomato is located on Island No. 25 in the Mississippi River, 11.5 miles (18.5 km) east-southeast of Blytheville. Tomato is known for its unusual place name.
