= Rock Run, Alabama =

- Unincorporated community
- Location within Alabama Location within the United States
- Coordinates: 34°01′40″N 85°29′43″W
- Country: United States
- State: Alabama
- County: Cherokee
- Elevation: 732 ft (223 m)
- Time zone: UTC-6 (Central (CST))
  - Summer (DST): UTC-5 (CDT)
- Area codes: 256 & 938
- GNIS feature ID: 155218

Rock Run is an unincorporated community in Cherokee County, Alabama, United States. Rock Run is located on County Route 29, 13.6 miles (21.9 km) southeast of Centre.

== History ==
Rock Run had its start as a mining community, and may have been named from a run on the rocks containing iron ore. According to another story, a settler climbing a hill dislodged a rock, and watching it roll down the hill, said "Look at that rock run!" A post office operated under the name Rock Run from 1883 to 1957.

== Demographics ==
In 1890, it was listed on the U.S. Census as having 360 residents, making it the largest incorporated community in Cherokee County, narrowly ahead of Centre, the county seat.

Historical population
Census	Pop.	Note	%±
1890	360		—
U.S. Decennial Census

== Gallery ==
Below are photographs of Rock Run as documented by the Historic American Engineering Record:

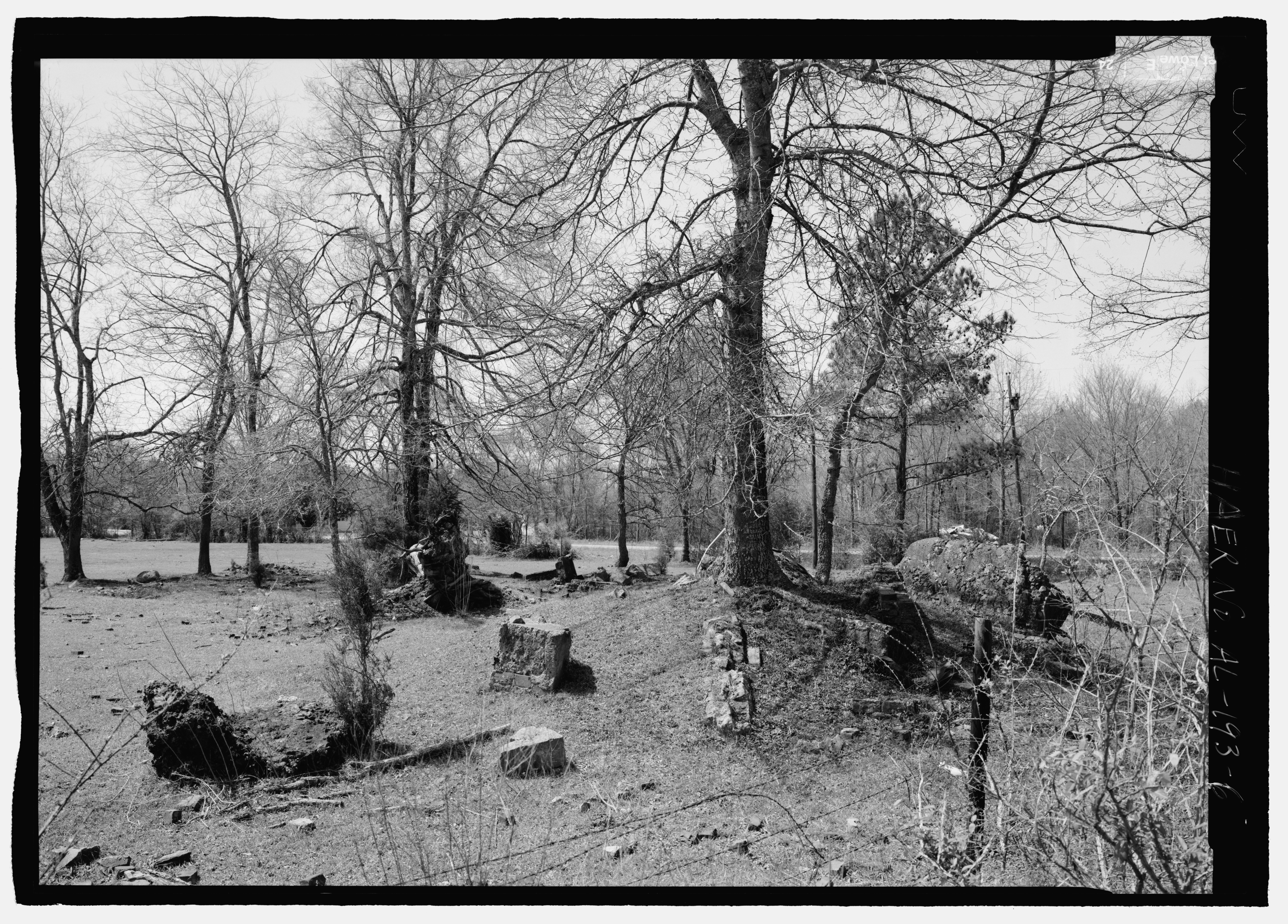
Furnace foundations

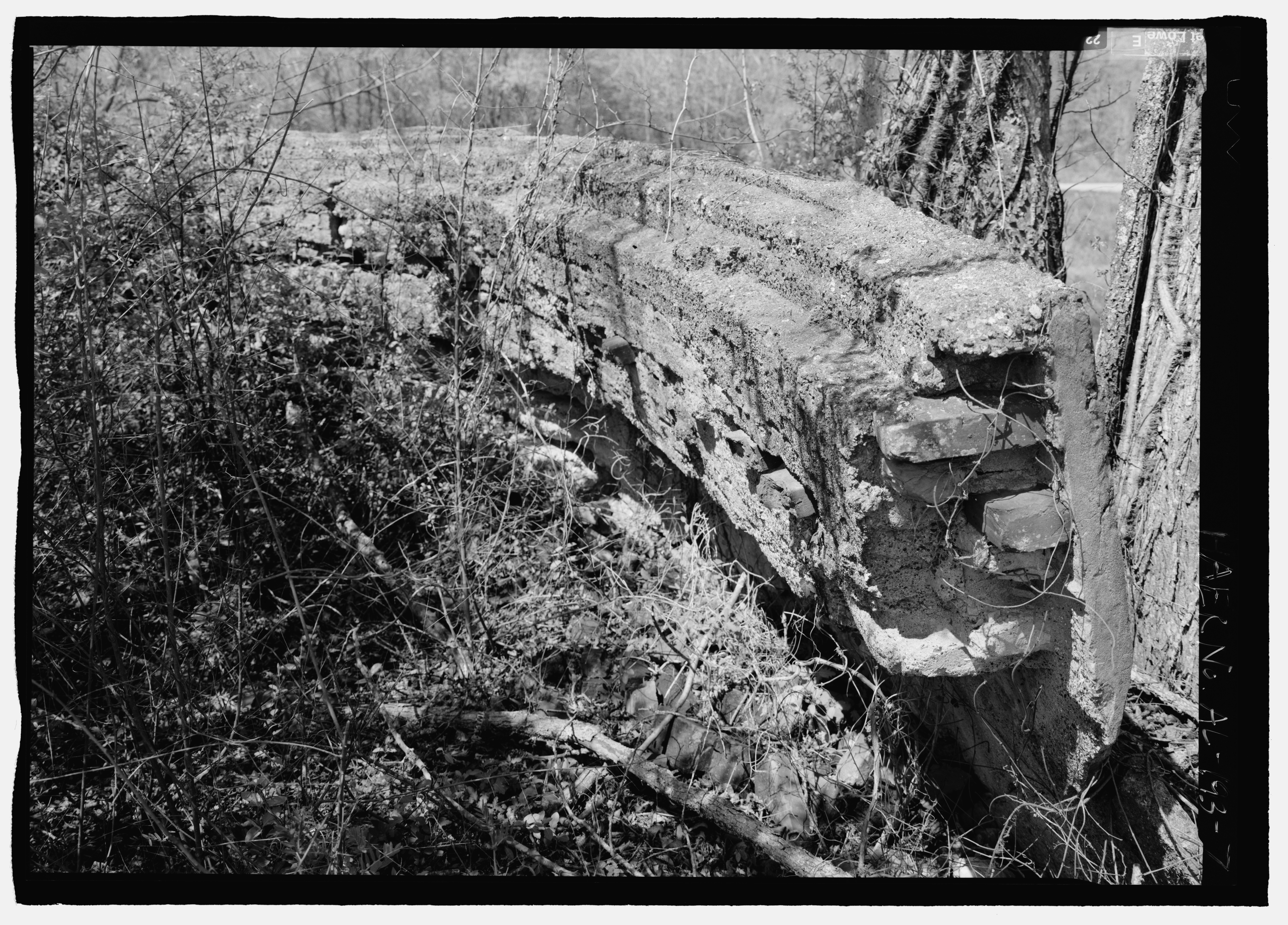
Furnace foundation

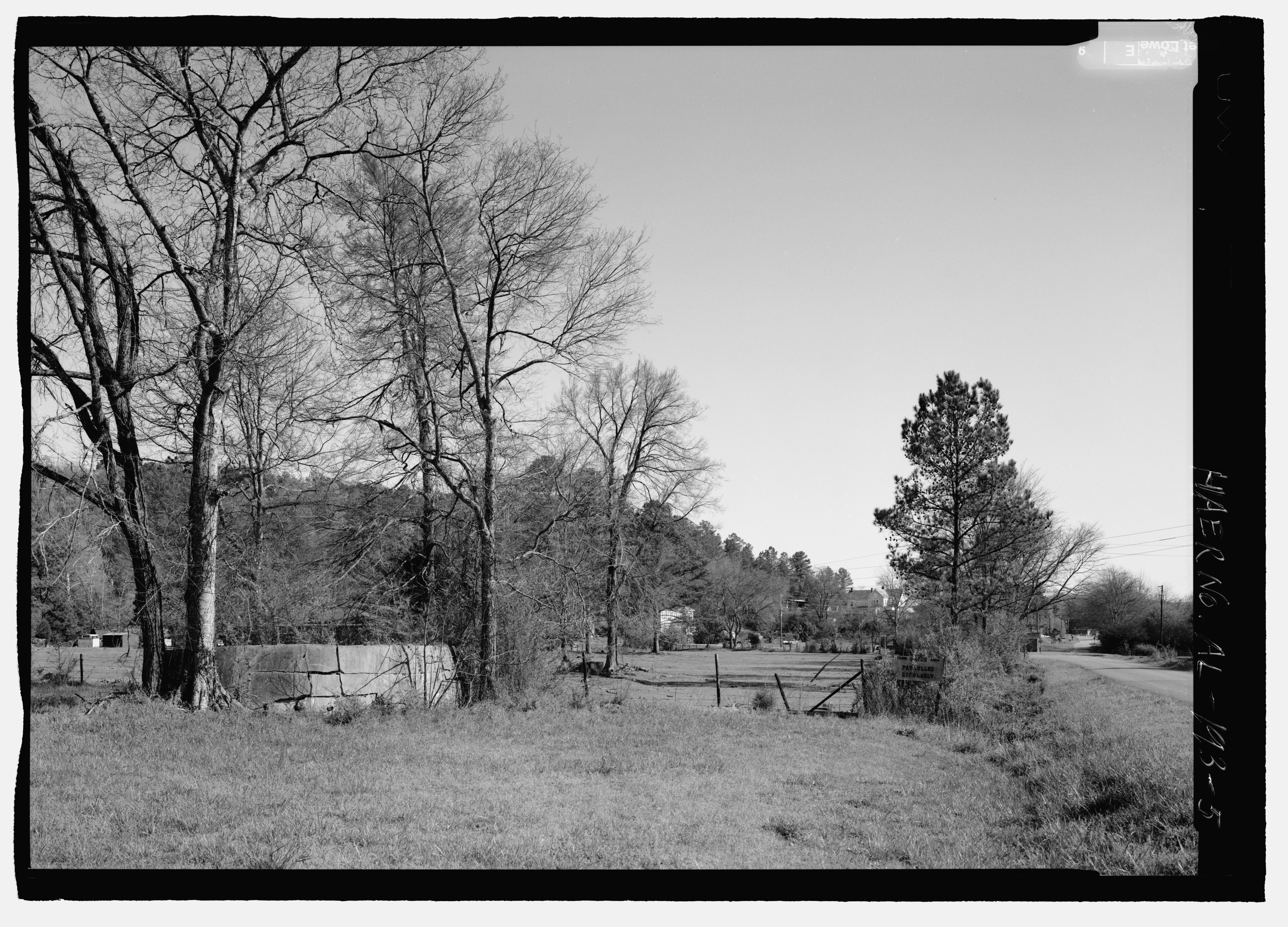
Furnace foundation

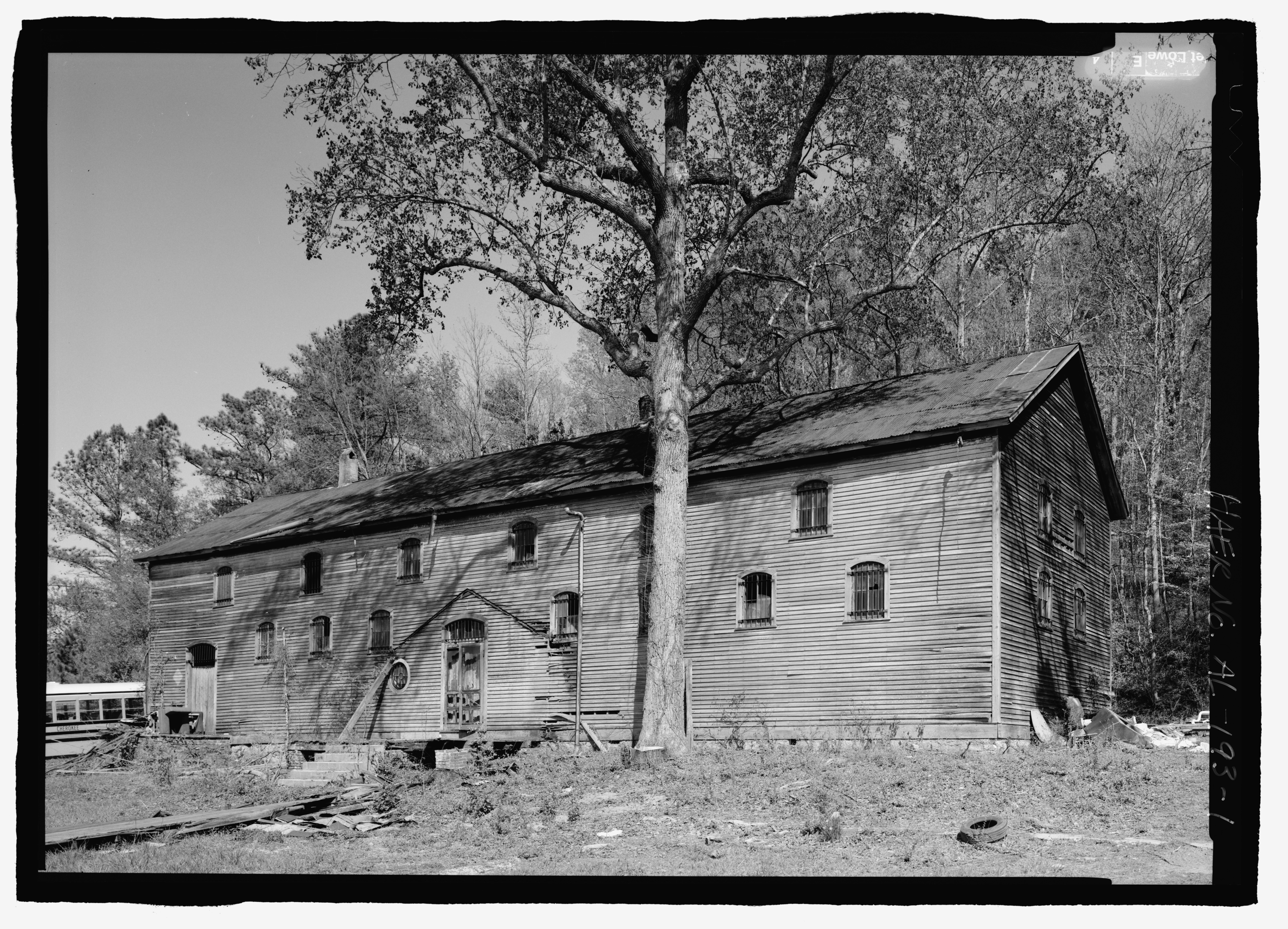
1890 furnace commissary building
