= Plum Creek, Iowa =

Ghost town in Kossuth County

Coordinates: 43°06′33″N 94°11′49″W

Plum Creek is a ghost town in Kossuth County, in the U.S. state of Iowa. A railroad station was once located at Plum Creek.

== History ==
Plum Creek contained a post office from 1902 until 1904. The hamlet took its name from nearby Plum Creek.

From 1899 to 1916 it was Home to the Plum Creek Co-op Creamery.
