= March 1933 Nashville tornado outbreak =

Tornado outbreak in the United States

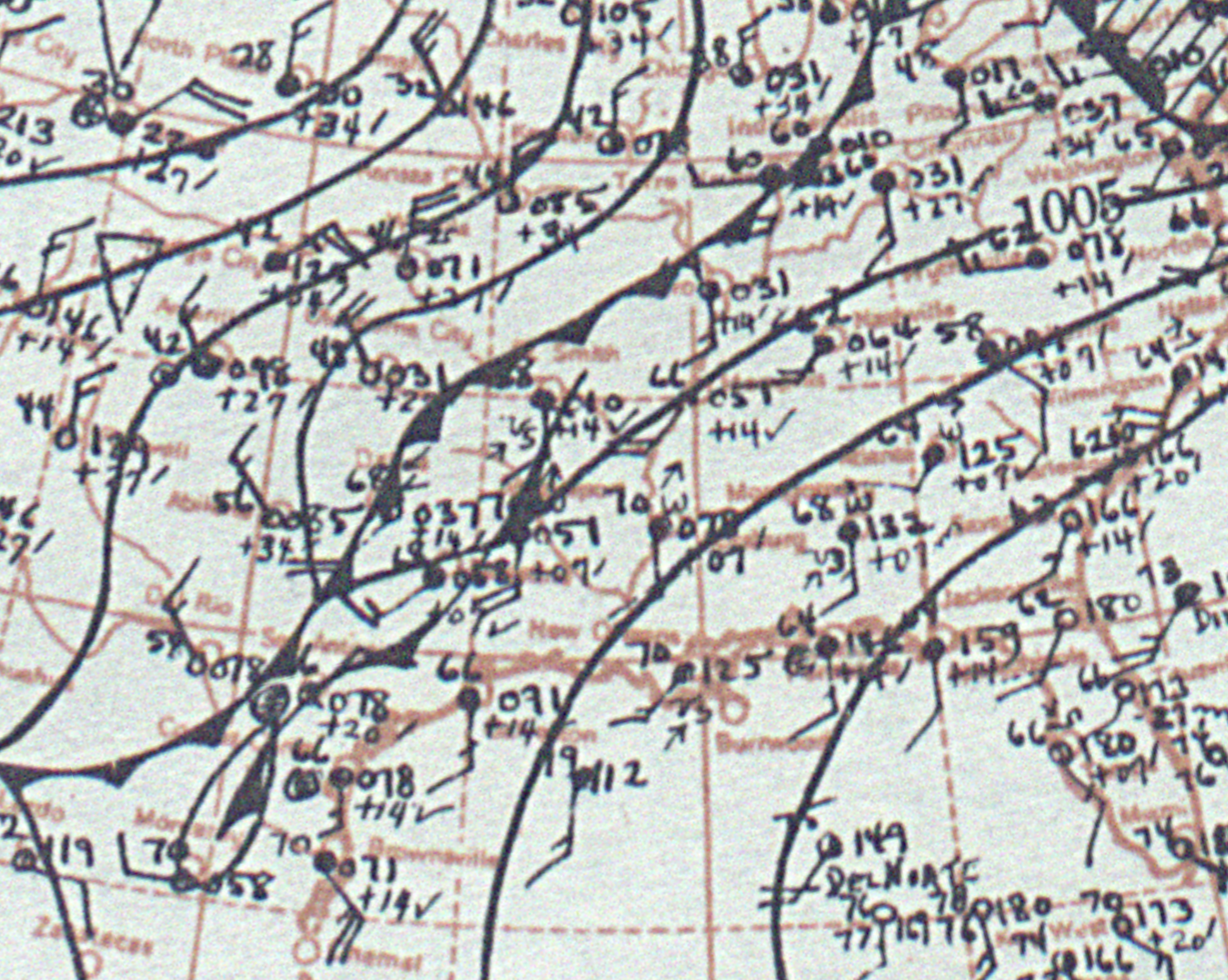
- Surface weather analysis of the eastern United States on the day of the outbreak

Meteorological history
- Date: March 14, 1933

Tornado outbreak
- Tornadoes: 5+
- Max. rating: F4 tornado
- Duration: ~3 hours

Overall effects
- Casualties: 44 fatalities, ≥461 injuries
- Damage: Unknown
- Areas affected: Arkansas, Tennessee

The March 1933 Nashville tornado outbreak was a deadly tornado outbreak that affected the city of Nashville and the Middle Tennessee region on March 14, 1933. The entire outbreak produced five or more tornadoes, killed 44 people, and injured at least 461. One of the tornadoes was an F3 tornado family that struck downtown Nashville, killing 15 people and injuring 235. It is the seventh-deadliest tornado in Middle Tennessee on record and is one of two significant tornado events in the region in 1933, the other being the Beaty Swamp tornado of May 10, 1933.

== Meteorological synopsis ==
In mid-March 1933, most of the Tennessee and Mississippi Valleys experienced a very warm late winter season due to a warm southerly flow coming in from the Gulf of Mexico, which bumped temperatures into the upper 70s and low 80s °F on March 14—well above normal temperatures in the upper 40s and low 50s °F. Two extratropical low pressure systems were moving across the central part of the continent with one storm centered over the Great Lakes and another over Arkansas. With the southern storm, a cold front swiftly neared from the west and produced a squall line of thunderstorms along it.

== Confirmed tornadoes ==
Confirmed tornadoes by Fujita rating
FU	F0	F1	F2	F3	F4	F5	Total
?	?	?	2	2	1	0	≥ 5

=== March 14 ===
F#	Location	County	Time (UTC)	Path length	Damage
Arkansas
F2	Bay area to N of Lepanto	Craighead, Poinsett, Mississippi	2230	12 miles (19 km)	This tornado leveled tenant homes as it passed north of Trumann and Lepanto, injuring 15 people.
Tennessee
F4	SW of Jellico to Pruden to W of Wheeler, Kentucky	Campbell, Claiborne, Bell (KY)	2230	30 miles (48 km)	12 deaths – This violent and long-lived tornado—the first member of a deadly, destructive, and long-tracked tornado family—leveled much of the mining community of Pruden, razing 60 homes—both little and large—and damaging 275 in the settlement. The tornado went on to injure college structures in Cumberland Gap before ending just north of the Tennessee–Kentucky state line.
F2	S of Arthur	Claiborne	2345	8 miles (13 km)	1 death – The previous storm produced this tornado as the violent Pruden tornado dissipated. One home was leveled at "Lonesome Valley", killing one person and injuring four others.
F3	NE of Sneedville to Kingsport area	Hancock, Hawkins, Sullivan	0015	50 miles (80 km)	16 deaths – Related to the storm that produced the previous two events, this devastating tornado family struck many rural communities just south of the Tennessee–Virginia border. Two deaths, 35 injuries, and $200,000 in losses were reported in Hancock and Hawkins Counties. The tornado caused eight more deaths along the northern outskirts of Kingsport, with 150 injuries and $350,000 in damages there. The tornado killed two more people and injured 50 as it left Kingsport and moved through the Reedy Creek valley. One of the deaths may have taken place in extreme southern Virginia, about 5 mi (8.0 km) north-northeast of Blountville. Extensive downburst damage occurred in Bristol, Tennessee. In all, the tornado leveled 80 homes and killed 200 or more cattle along its path.
F3	Nashville to E of Lebanon	Davidson, Wilson, Smith	0130	45 miles (72 km)	15 deaths – See section on this tornado
Source: Grazulis

=== Nashville–Lebanon, Tennessee ===
Nashville–Lebanon, Tennessee
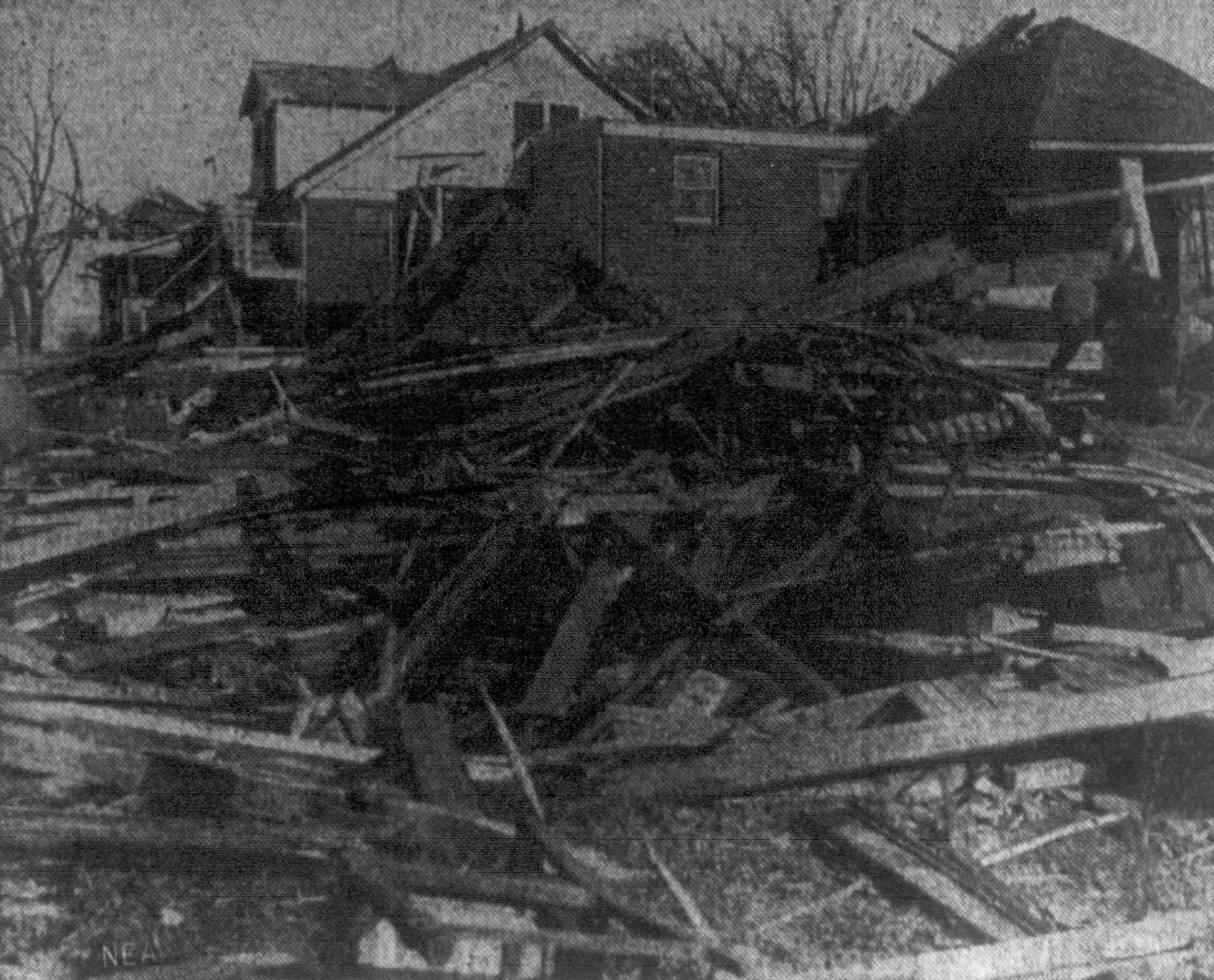
- Destroyed houses in East Nasvhille are pictured in the Chattanooga News on March 16, 1933.

F3 tornado
- on the Fujita scale

Overall effects
- Casualties: 15 fatalities, 235 injuries

At around 6:45 p.m. local time—approximately one hour after sunset—one thunderstorm neared what is now the Nashville metropolitan area. Shortly before 7:30 p.m. a tornado touched down 4 mi (6.4 km) west of downtown Nashville, along the Charlotte Pike and 51st Avenue. The tornado intensified as it proceeded into downtown Nashville, shattering windows in the Tennessee State Capitol. The tornado extensively damaged many structures in downtown Nashville and passed only several hundred feet from the U.S. Weather Bureau office. As it crossed the Cumberland River into East Nashville, the tornado burgeoned to 800 yards (732 m) wide, damaging several four-story factories. Within a 3-mile (4.8 km) segment of the path through East Nashville, the tornado was particularly damaging to homes, churches, businesses, and schools. In this area alone, the tornado damaged or destroyed at least 1,400 homes and more than 60 other buildings. All of the 11 deaths in Nashville occurred on the east side of the city. The Donelson neighborhood sustained severe damage as homes were reduced to "splinters", other buildings were leveled, and trees and power lines were felled. The tornado was last reported in the Hermitage part of Nashville, home to The Hermitage plantation, former residence of U.S. President Andrew Jackson. After traveling 12 mi (19 km), the tornado likely lifted and reformed into a second tornado. Practically no damage occurred in extreme eastern Davidson County.

Shortly afterward, the tornado dipped to the ground and re-intensified. In Lebanon, about 228 structures were damaged or destroyed; 20 of them were called "ruined." Two deaths occurred along the outskirts of Lebanon, and two more occurred in the Bellwood suburb of Nashville. In all, the tornado killed 15 people and injured at least 45. The tornado disproved residents' illusion that hills to the southwest protected Nashville from tornadoes. Based on descriptions and photographs of the damage, the tornado is estimated to have been an F3; the Fujita scale had not been implemented at that time, and would not be devised until 1971. Damage was estimated at $2.2 million ($27.5 million in 1998 dollars). After the storm, National Guard troops, the Red Cross, Salvation Army officials, and the Boy Scouts quickly responded in the cleanup and recovery efforts. Due to the fast and heavy response of local police, looting and panic was minimal.

On April 16, 1998, another F3 tornado, which started near the same point as the 1933 tornado, affected the downtown area. Then, nearly 22 years later, just after midnight on March 3, 2020, an EF3 tornado moved through areas just north of Downtown Nashville nearly affecting some of the same areas as the earlier two storms.

== See also ==
- List of North American tornadoes and tornado outbreaks
  - List of F4 and EF4 tornadoes
- Tornado outbreak of April 15–16, 1998
- Tornado outbreak of March 2–3, 2020
