= Cundiff, Kentucky =

Unincorporated community in Kentucky, United States

Cundiff
- Unincorporated community
- Location within the state of Kentucky Cundiff (the United States)
- Coordinates: 36°56′41″N 85°15′16″W
- Country: United States
- State: Kentucky
- County: Adair
- Elevation: 968 ft (295 m)
- Time zone: UTC-6 (Central (CST))
  - Summer (DST): UTC-5 (CDT)
- GNIS feature ID: 507797

Cundiff is an unincorporated community in Adair County, Kentucky, United States. Its elevation is 968 feet (295 m).

== History ==
Previously known as Melson Ridge, after a local hill named for the Melson family, Cundiff was likely named for Rester C. Cundiff, the postmaster when the post office opened in 1925.

On May 9, 1933, an F4 tornado struck Cundiff, killing two people in the community.
