= List of Kansas suffragists =

This is a list of Kansas suffragists, suffrage groups and others associated with the cause of women's suffrage in Kansas.

== Groups ==
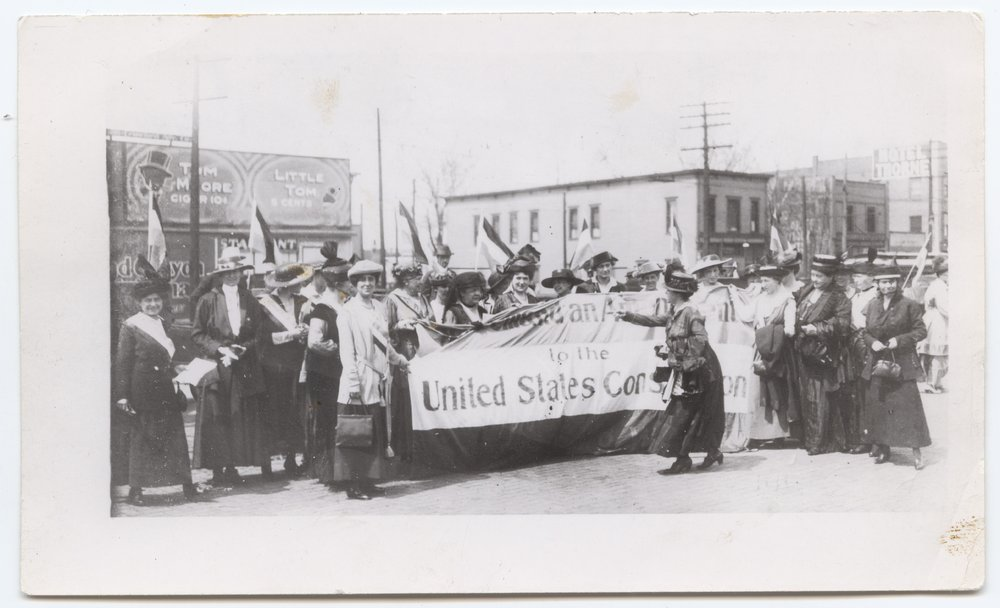
- Delegates to the Kansas Equal Suffrage Association in Topeka 1916
  Barber County Equal Suffrage Association.
- Bourbon County Equal Suffrage Association.
- Chautauqua County Equal Suffrage Association.
- Comanche County Equal Suffrage Association.
- Crawford County Equal Suffrage Association.
- Dickinson County Equal Suffrage Association.
- Douglas County Equal Suffrage Association.
- Edwards County Equal Suffrage Association.
- Ford County Equal Suffrage Association.
- Good Government Club.
- Harper County Equal Suffrage Association.
- Kansas Equal Suffrage Association (KESA).
- Kansas Federation of Women's Clubs.
- Kingman Equal Suffrage Association.
- Kiowa County Equal Suffrage Association.
- Labette County Equal Suffrage Association.
- Lawrence Equal Suffrage Association.
- Lincoln Suffrage Society.
- Manhattan Equal Suffrage Association.
- Meade County Equal Suffrage Association.
- Medicine Lodge Equal Suffrage Association.
- The Men's League.
- National Woman's Party.
- Norton County Equal Suffrage Association.
- Ogden Equal Suffrage Association.
- Oswego Equal Suffrage Association.
- Ottawa County Equal Suffrage Association.
- Pawnee County Equal Suffrage Association.
- Reno County Equal Suffrage Association.
- Topeka Equal Suffrage Association.
- Woman's Christian Temperance Union.
- Woman's Day Club.
- Zeandale Equal Suffrage Association.

== Publications ==
- Kansas Sunflower.

== Suffragists ==
- Kate Aplington (Council Grove).
- Daniel Read Anthony (Leavenworth).
- Daniel R. Anthony Jr. (Leavenworth).
- Elizabeth Barr Arthur (1884–1971) – suffragist from Kansas; poet, author, journalist, librarian, and police officer.
- Martia L. Davis Berry (1844–1894) – treasurer, Kansas Equal Suffrage Association.
- Iris Calderhead (Marysville).
- William Herbert Carruth (Lawrence).
- Mamie Dillard (1874–1954) – African American educator, clubwoman and suffragist.
- Trixie Friganza (Grenola).
- Mary Tenney Gray (1833–1904) – writer, clubwoman, philanthropist, suffragist.
- Sophronia Farrington Naylor Grubb (1834–1902), temperance activist.
- Sarah C. Hall (1832–1926) – physician; President, Bourbon County, Kansas Equal Suffrage Association.
- Edgar Watson Howe (Atchinson).
- Laura M. Johns (1849–1935) – suffragist, journalist (Salina).
- Lucy Browne Johnston (1846–1937) – president of the Kansas Federation of Women's Clubs, and was involved in the Kansas Equal Suffrage Association.
- Lilla Day Monroe (1858–1929) – Kansas suffragist, lawyer.
- Ella Uphay Mowry (1865–1923) – Kansas suffragist and the first female gubernatorial candidate in Kansas.
- May Wood Simons (Girard).
- Anna C. Wait (1837–1916) – Kansas Equal Suffrage Association.
- Ella B Ensor Wilson (1838–1913) – social reformer.

=== Politicians supporting women's suffrage ===
- Jonathan M. Davis.
- William Agnew Johnston.
- John Martin.

== Suffragists campaigning in Kansas ==
- Sylvia Pankhurst.
- Frances Woods.

== See also ==
- List of American suffragists
- Women's suffrage in the United States
