= Tornadoes of 1966 =

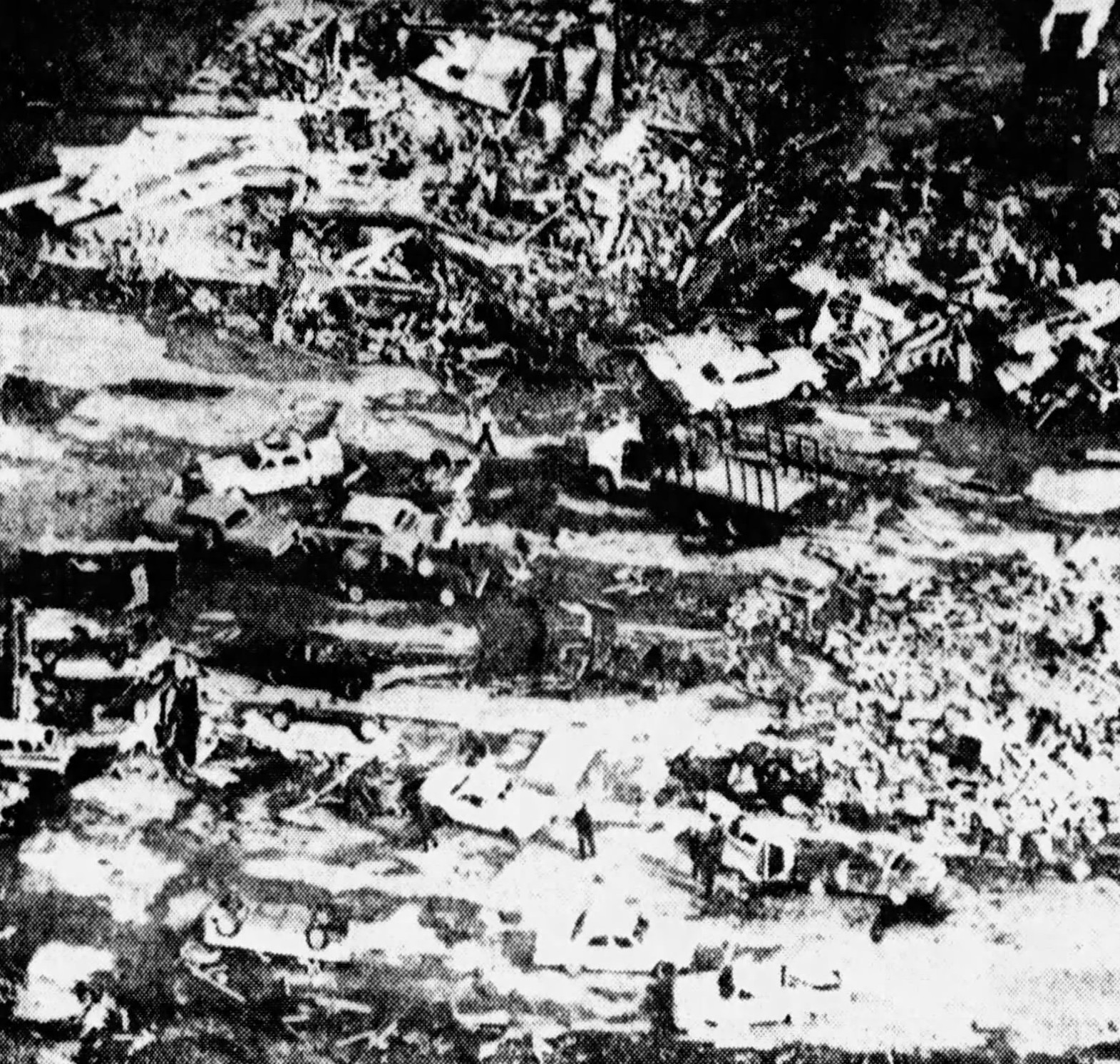
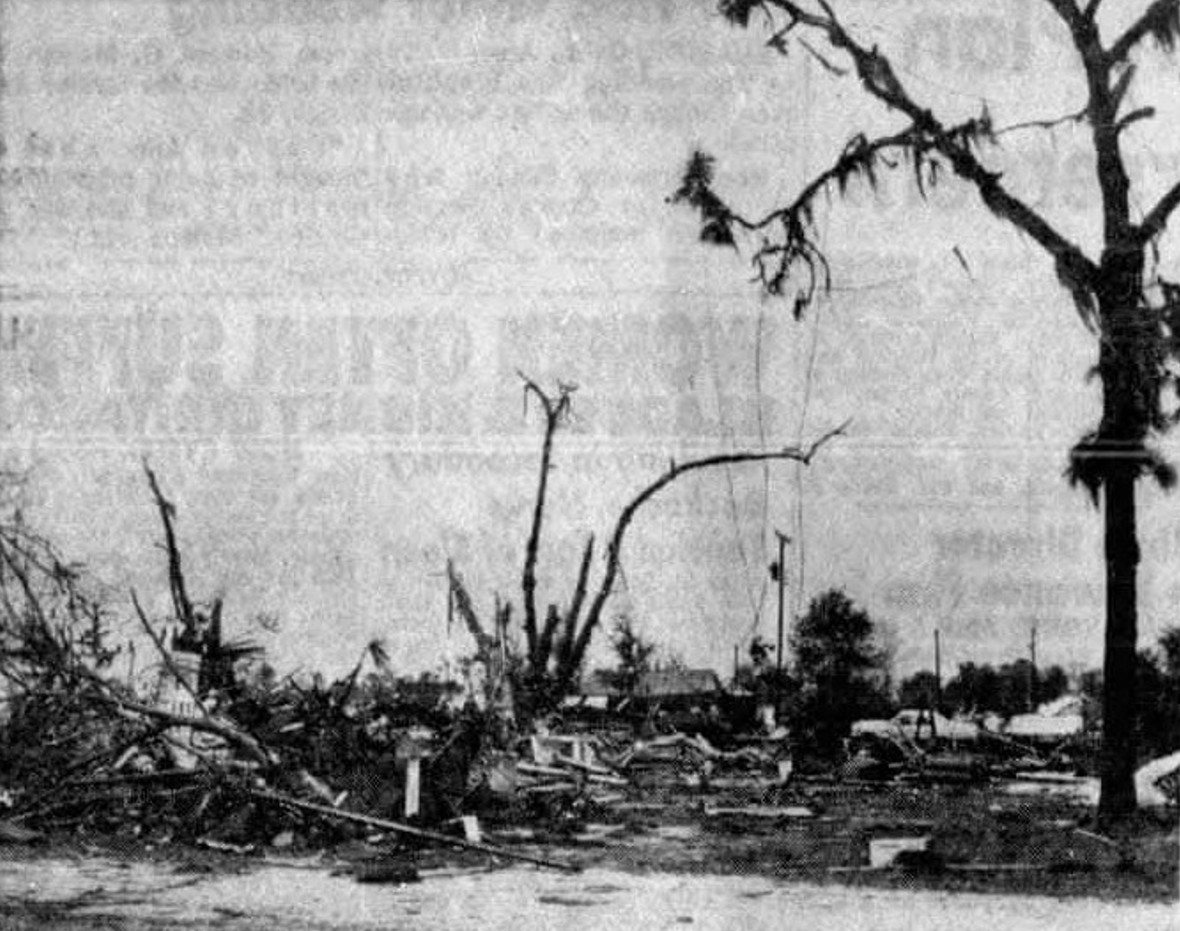
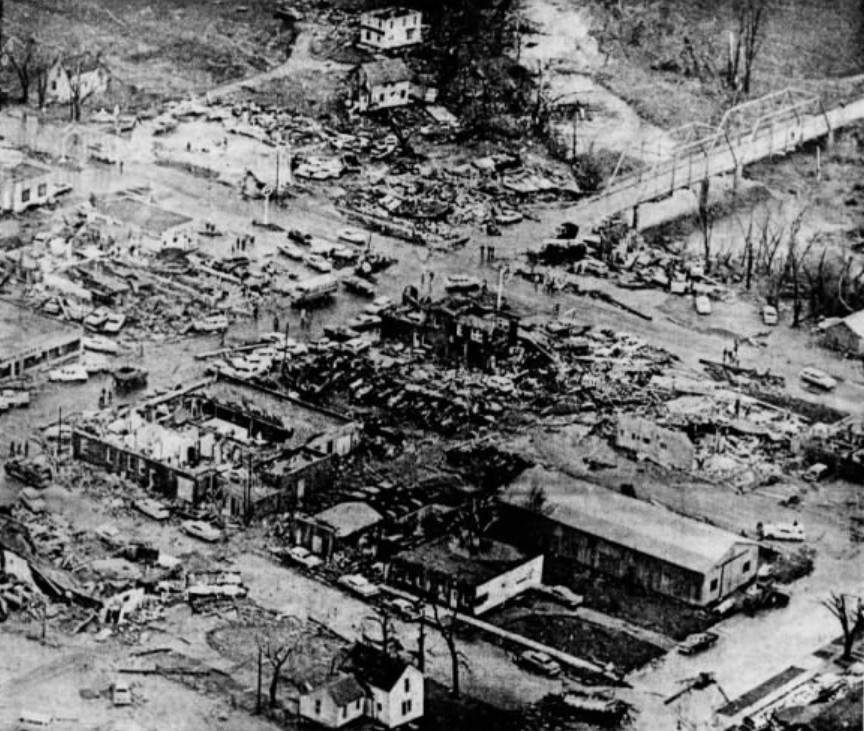
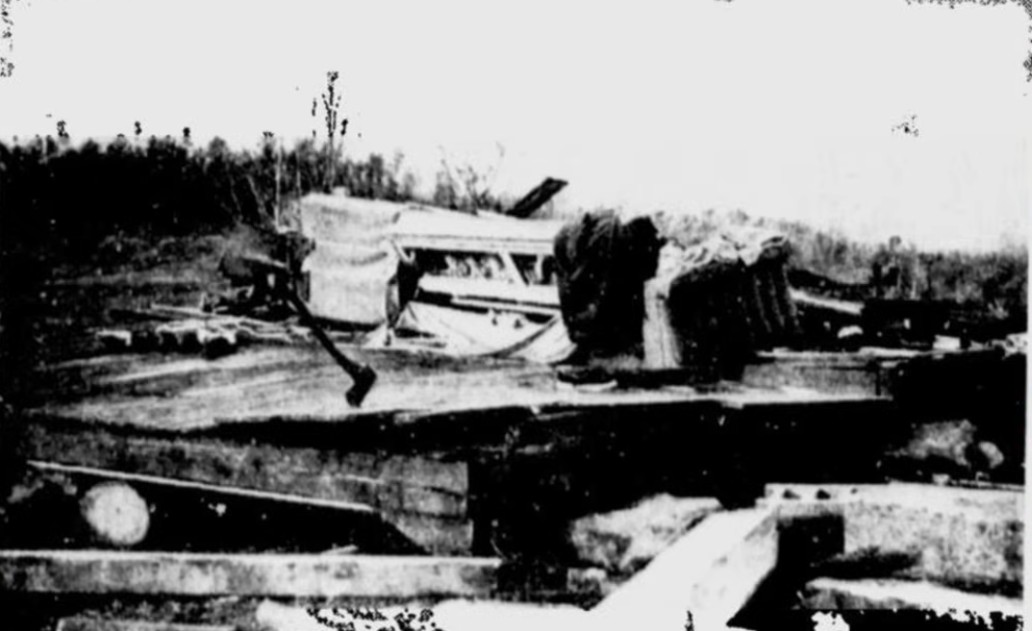
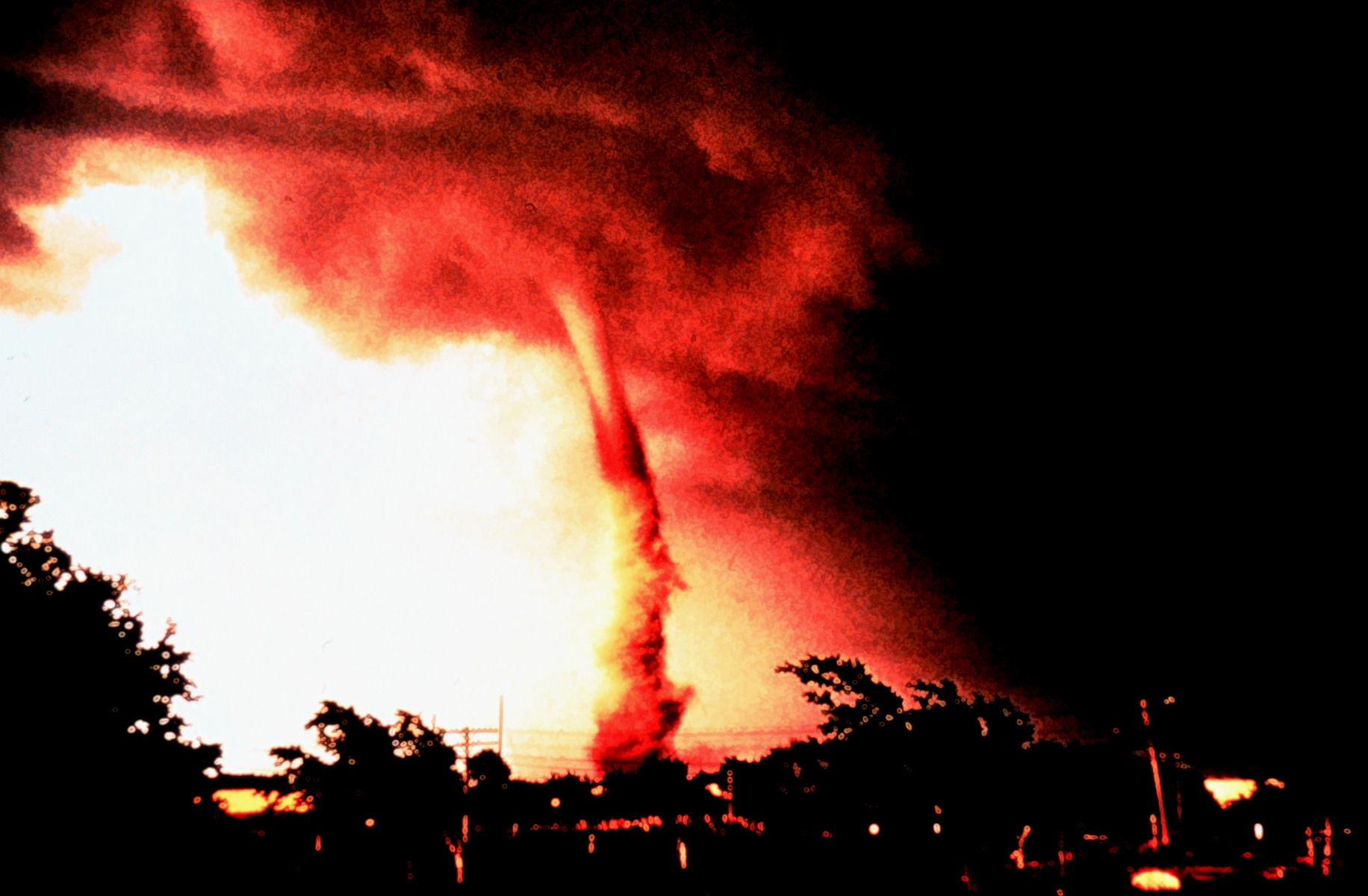
- Clockwise from top: A violent F5 tornado in Topeka, Kansas on June 8; Intense damage in Tampa, Florida after an F4 tornado on April 4; A home near Coker, Alabama after an F2 tornado on March 3; A tornado near Enid, Oklahoma on June 5; An aerial photo of downtown Belmond, Iowa after an F5 tornado on October 14; The Candlestick Park shopping mall in Jackson, Mississippi after an F5 tornado on March 3.
- Timespan: January - December 1966
- Maximum rated tornado: F5 tornado: Jackson, Mississippi on March 3; Topeka, Kansas on June 8; Belmond, Iowa on October 14
- Tornadoes in U.S.: 585
- Damage (U.S.): Unknown
- Fatalities (U.S.): 98
- Fatalities (worldwide): >98

This page documents the tornadoes and tornado outbreaks of 1966, primarily in the United States. Most tornadoes form in the U.S., although some events may take place internationally. Tornado statistics for older years like this often appear significantly lower than modern years due to fewer reports or confirmed tornadoes.

== Events ==
Fatal United States tornadoes in 1966
- Approximate touchdown location of killer tornadoes in 1966 Summary of tornadoes: March 3 – Mississippi, Alabama (58 deaths); April 4 – Florida (11 deaths); April 26 – Mississippi (1 death); June 8 – Kansas (16 deaths); June 8 – Kansas (1 death); June 9 – Illinois (1 death); June 24 – North Dakota (1 death); July 31 – North Dakota, South Dakota (2 deaths); July 31 – South Dakota (1 death); October 14 – Iowa (6 deaths); Total fatalities: 98

=== United States yearly total ===
Confirmed tornadoes by Fujita rating
FU	F0	F1	F2	F3	F4	F5	Total
0	169	239	145	25	4	3	585

== January ==
One tornado was reported in the United States in January.

=== January 28 ===
The only confirmed tornado of the month, a brief, nighttime F3 tornado, struck near New Orleans, Louisiana. No injuries or fatalities were reported.

== February ==
There were 28 tornadoes reported in the United States in February.

=== February 8–10 ===
FU	F0	F1	F2	F3	F4	F5
0	1	3	3	1	0	0

A localized outbreak occurred in Oklahoma, Texas, and Louisiana. An F3 tornado struck areas near Edna, Texas. There were no fatalities or injuries from the outbreak.

== March ==
There were 12 tornadoes reported in the United States in March.

=== March 3–4 ===
FU	F0	F1	F2	F3	F4	F5
0	0	3	0	0	0	1

On March 3, a supercell produced an extremely violent, exceptionally long-tracked F5 tornado that devastated parts of Jackson, Mississippi and Alabama. The tornado, dubbed the Candlestick Park Tornado (after the shopping center it leveled) killed 58 people and injured over 500 along its 202.5 mile long track. The same supercell that produced the Candlestick Park Tornado also spawned two short lived F1 tornadoes with an additional F1 tornado occurring the next day.

== April ==
There were 80 tornadoes reported in the United States in April.

=== April 4–5 ===
FU	F0	F1	F2	F3	F4	F5
0	0	0	1	0	1	0

Two long-track tornadoes touched down in Florida, and traveled across the whole state. One tornado touched down near Largo and tore through Northern Tampa at around 8:00 in the morning. This tornado devastated several communities across Florida, receiving an F4 rating. That tornado killed 11 people, and injured over 500. The second tornado, an F2, did not cause as much damage as the first tornado, as the funnel remained aloft for most of its life span.

== May ==
There were 98 tornadoes reported in the United States in May.

=== May 11 ===
FU	F0	F1	F2	F3	F4	F5
0	3	4	3	2	0	0

Two F3 tornadoes occurred, one in Washington County, Kansas, and the other in Shawnee County, both were reported to be skipping along their tracks. Many other tornadoes were reported.

=== May 16 ===
FU	F0	F1	F2	F3	F4	F5
0	3	2	2	0	0	0

An F1 tornado injured 11 people when it tracked through Columbus, Georgia. It was one of seven tornadoes to touch down that day.

== June ==
There were 126 tornadoes reported in the United States in June.

=== June 3–12 ===
FU	F0	F1	F2	F3	F4	F5
0	22	14	18	2	2	1

A violent F5 tornado tracked through Topeka, Kansas on June 8, killing 16 people and injuring 450. This tornado disproved several myths, as Burnett’s Mound, a local hill, was believed to protect the city from tornadoes. However, the F5 tornado traveled directly over the mound and into Topeka, where it killed 16 people. The tornado directly impacted Washburn University, and rows of homes were absolutely clean from their foundations. Elsewhere, an F4 tornado struck Leavenworth, Kansas, killing one and injuring two. In total, the outbreak produced 59 tornadoes, killed 18 people, and injured 543.

== July ==
There were 100 tornadoes reported in the United States in July.

=== July 31 ===
Multiple tornadoes were reported, including an F3 that traveled around 25 miles through McIntosh County, North Dakota, and McPherson County, South Dakota.

== August ==
There were 58 tornadoes reported in the United States in August.

=== August 9 ===
FU	F0	F1	F2	F3	F4	F5
0	5	1	0	0	0	0

Isolated tornadoes touched down in multiple regions of the U.S.. The strongest one was an unusual F1 tornado that injured 9 people near Globe, Arizona.

== September ==
There were 22 tornadoes reported in the United States in September.

=== September 29 ===
An isolated, but strong 60–yard wide F3 tornado tracked 4.5 miles through southeastern Cleveland, Ohio, injuring 20 people, but killing no one.

== October ==
There were 29 tornadoes reported in the United States in October.

=== October 14–15 ===
FU	F0	F1	F2	F3	F4	F5
0	1	6	13	2	0	1

A tornado outbreak occurred across the Midwest. The outbreak produced a violent F5 tornado that devastated Belmond, Iowa, killing six and injuring 172, although the F5 rating is disputed. In all, 23 tornadoes touched down across four states, killing six people and injuring 225 others.

== November ==
There were 20 tornadoes reported in the United States in November.

=== November 7 ===
FU	F0	F1	F2	F3	F4	F5
0	0	1	3	0	0	0

An unusual series of strong tornadoes occurred in Southern California, affecting Los Angeles. Two of the three F2 tornadoes touched down in Los Angeles, injuring 10 people but killing no one.

== December ==
There were 11 tornadoes reported in the United States in December.

== See also ==
- Tornado
  - Tornadoes by year
  - Tornado records
  - Tornado climatology
  - Tornado myths
- List of tornado outbreaks
  - List of F5 and EF5 tornadoes
  - List of North American tornadoes and tornado outbreaks
  - List of 21st-century Canadian tornadoes and tornado outbreaks
  - List of European tornadoes and tornado outbreaks
  - List of tornadoes and tornado outbreaks in Asia
  - List of Southern Hemisphere tornadoes and tornado outbreaks
  - List of tornadoes striking downtown areas
  - List of tornadoes with confirmed satellite tornadoes
- Tornado intensity
  - Fujita scale
  - Enhanced Fujita scale
