= Tornado outbreak sequence of June 1966 =

Weather event in the United States

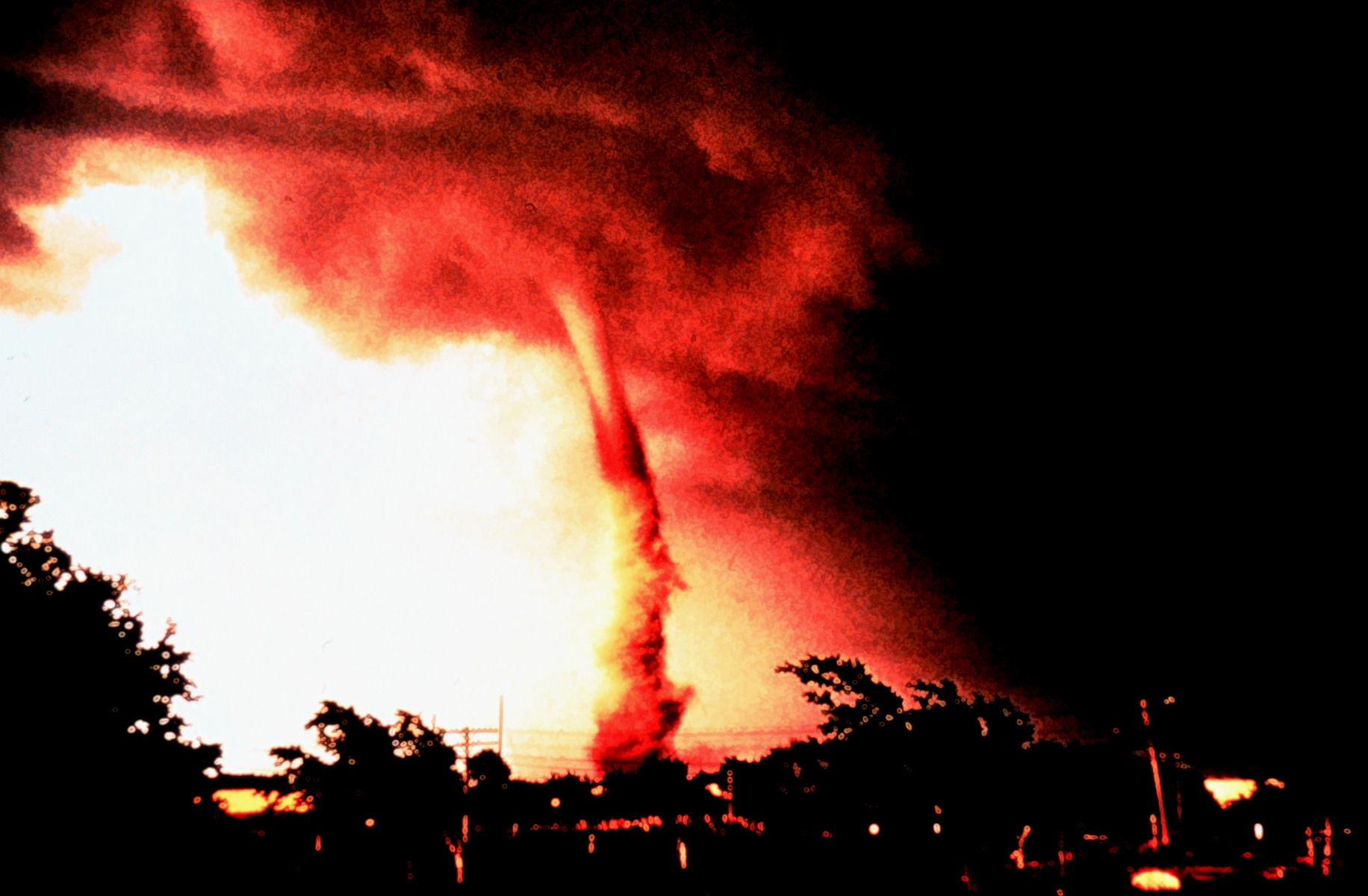
- A tornado near Enid, Oklahoma on June 5.

Meteorological history
- Duration: June 3–12

Tornado outbreak
- Tornadoes: 57
- Max. rating: F5 tornado
- Duration: ~11 days

Overall effects
- Fatalities: 18
- Injuries: 543
- Damage: $250 million (1966 USD) $2.5 billion (2026 USD)
- Areas affected: Southern and Midwestern United States, Great Plains
- Part of the tornado outbreaks of 1966

The tornado outbreak sequence of June 1966 (Note: An outbreak is generally defined as a group of at least six tornadoes (the number sometimes varies slightly according to local climatology) with no more than a six-hour gap between individual tornadoes. An outbreak sequence, prior to (after) modern records that began in 1950, is defined as, at most, two (one) consecutive days without at least one significant (F2 or stronger) tornado.) (Note: All damage totals are in 1966 United States dollars unless otherwise noted.) was a series of large and devastating tornado outbreaks which occurred between June 2 and June 12, 1966. The nearly two-week event of severe weather was mainly concentrated in the Midwestern (Great Plains) region of the United States, but was widely spread out to areas as far south as Texas and Florida, and as far east as New York.

The most powerful and destructive tornado of this event occurred on the early evening of Wednesday, June 8, when Topeka, Kansas, was struck by an F5 rated tornado. It started on the southwest side of town, moving northeast, passing through several subdivisions and over a local landmark named Burnett's Mound. 57 tornadoes were confirmed during the 11-day span, which left 18 people dead and 543 injured (17 of the 18 deaths and 450 of the injuries were attributed to the Topeka tornado).

== Confirmed tornadoes ==
Confirmed tornadoes by Fujita rating
FU	F0	F1	F2	F3	F4	F5	Total
5	12	17	18	2	2	1	57

=== June 3 event ===
List of reported tornadoes - Friday, June 3, 1966
F#	County	Coord.	Time (UTC)	Path length	Damage
South Dakota
FU	Aurora	43.9°N 98.9°W	2300	0.1 miles (0.2 km)	Brief touchdown, no damage reported. Tornado was confirmed but was not given a rating.
F0	Yankton	42.9°N 97.4°W	0200	0.1 miles (0.2 km)	Brief touchdown, no damage reported.
Sources: ,

=== June 4 event ===
List of reported tornadoes - Saturday, June 4, 1966
F#	County	Coord.	Time (UTC)	Path length	Damage
Colorado
F0	Logan	40.93°N 103.18°W	2300	0.1 miles (0.2 km)	Brief touchdown, no damage reported.
Wisconsin
F2	Oconto	45.02°N 88.38°W	0100	5.4 miles (8.7 km)	First of the F2 triplet tornadoes in Oconto County. Barns were destroyed.
F2	Oconto	44.95°N 88.33°W	0100	4.9 miles (7.9 km)	Second of the F2 triplet tornadoes in Oconto County.
F2	Oconto	44.88°N 88.3°W	0100	4.7 miles (7.6 km)	Last of the F2 triplet tornadoes in Oconto County.
Nebraska
FU	Morrill	41.73°N 102.87°W	0148	0.1 miles (0.2 km)	Brief touchdown, no damage reported.
South Dakota
F2	Gregory	43.23°N 99.43°W	330	1 mile (1.6 km)	1.5 mile wide tornado caused severe damage.

=== June 5 event ===
List of reported tornadoes - Sunday, June 5, 1966
F#	County	Coord.	Time (UTC)	Path length	Damage
Nebraska
F2	Boone	41.7°N 98.17°W	0608	0.7 miles (1.1 km)	1 Injury – Brief touchdown injured one person.
FU	Madison	41°N 97.6°W	0612	0.1 miles (0.2 km)	Brief touchdown, no damage reported. Tornado was confirmed but was not given an F-Scale intensity.
Minnesota
F0	Pipestone	43.97°N 96.08°W	1200	0.1 miles (0.2 km)	Brief touchdown caused minor damage.
Oklahoma
F0	Baine	35.85°N 98.47°W	2300	0.1 miles (0.2 km)	Brief touchdown, no damage reported.
F2	Kay	36.83°N 97.4°W	2350	2.5 miles (4.0 km)	1 Injury – A house was pushed 12 feet off of its foundation and another was badly damaged. Barns were destroyed as well.
F0	Garfield	36.48°N 97.88°W	0030	4.3 miles (6.9 km)	No damage reported. First of four tornadoes to hit Garfield County in only 30 minutes.
F1	Grant	36.67°N 97.62°W	0030	1.4 miles (2.3 km)	Quarter-mile-wide tornado caused damage to structures.
F2	Garfield	36.47°N 97.88°W	0035	0.1 miles (0.2 km)	6 Injuries – Tornado struck Enid and caused $250,000 in damages. 3 trailers were destroyed and 3 others were damaged. 11 homes had their roofs torn off and 112 others were damaged. Boxcars were overturned and a truck garage was destroyed. Second of four tornadoes to hit Garfield County in only 30 minutes.
F0	Garfield	36.3°N 98.1°W	0055	3.8 miles (6.1 km)	Third of four tornadoes to hit Garfield County in only 30 minutes.
F1	Garfield	36.37°N 97.9°W	0100	5.7 miles (9.2 km)	Last of four tornadoes to hit Garfield County in only 30 minutes.
Missouri
F1	Gentry	40.23°N 94.28°W	0000	0.1 miles (0.2 km)	Brief touchdown caused minor damage.
Iowa
F2	Linn	42.28°N 91.5°W	0430	0.1 miles (0.2 km)	

=== June 6 event ===
List of reported tornadoes - Monday, June 6, 1966
F#	County	Coord.	Time (UTC)	Path length	Damage
Kentucky
F2	McCracken, Madison	36.97°N 88.62°W	1800	18.5 miles (29.8 km)	Strong tornado injured two. Grazulis did not list this event, impling that the damage was actually caused by straight-line winds.
Florida
F1	Pinellas	27.92°N 82.75°W	2030	0.3 miles (0.5 km)	Brief touchdown injured one.

=== June 7 event ===
List of reported tornadoes - Tuesday, June 7, 1966
F#	County	Coord.	Time (UTC)	Path length	Damage
Kansas
FU	Wallace	38.85°N 101.7°W	2310	0.1 miles (0.2 km)	Brief touchdown, no damage reported. Tornado was confirmed but was not given an F-Scale intensity.
F0	McPherson	38.2°N 97.52°W	2330	0.1 miles (0.2 km)	Brief touchdown caused minor damage.
FU	Ellis	38.78°N 99.48°W	0100	0.1 miles (0.2 km)	Brief touchdown caused minor damage. Tornado was confirmed but was not given an F-Scale intensity.
Missouri
F0	Stoddard	37.1°N 89.92°W	2330	0.1 miles (0.2 km)	Brief touchdown caused minor damage.
Oklahoma
F0	Ellis	37.1°N 89.92°W	0000	0.1 miles (0.2 km)	Brief touchdown, no damage reported.

=== June 8 event ===
List of reported tornadoes - Wednesday, June 8, 1966
F#	County	Coord.	Time (UTC)	Path length	Damage
Florida
F0	Miami-Dade	25.75°N 80.25°W	1200	4.9 miles (7.9 km)	No damage reported.
F1	Miami-Dade	25.6°N 80.3°W	1700	0.1 miles (0.2 km)	Brief touchdown caused minor damage.
Kansas
F0	Rice	38.25°N 98.4°W	2118	0.1 miles (0.2 km)	Brief touchdown, no damage reported.
F2	Clay	39.13°N 97.15°W	2337	8.9 miles (14.3 km)	Caused damage to farms.
F3	Riley	39.07°N 96.77°W	0000	13.8 miles (22.2 km)	At least 65 Injuries – Enormous 1.2 mile wide tornado, caused $5 million in damage in Manhattan. KSU campus sustained $1,850,000 in damage alone. 11 homes were destroyed and others were unroofed. An apartment building and 66 trailers were destroyed as well.
F5	Shawnee	38.92°N 95.92°W	0100	21.1 miles (34.0 km)	17 Deaths 500+ Injuries – See section on this tornado
F2	Leavenworth	39.23°N 95.03°W	0115	8.2 miles (13.2 km)	Trailers were destroyed and a home was unroofed. First of two tornadoes to hit Leavenworth County.
F4	Leavenworth	39.17°N 95.18°W	0200	19.9 miles (32.0 km)	1 Death 2 Injuries – One home was leveled and a car was thrown and destroyed. Second of two tornadoes to hit Leavenworth County.
Oklahoma
F1	Caddo	35.48°N 98.4°W	2330	0.5 miles (0.8 km)	Brief touchdown caused minor damage.
F0	Washita	35.3°N 98.8°W	0000	0.1 miles (0.2 km)	Brief touchdown, no damage reported.
F0	Caddo	35.17°N 98.2°W	0120	0.1 miles (0.2 km)	Brief touchdown, no damage reported.

=== June 9 event ===
List of reported tornadoes - Thursday, June 9, 1966
F#	County	Coord.	Time (UTC)	Path length	Damage
Illinois
F0	Cook	42.1°N 88.02°W	1110	0.1 miles (0.2 km)	Brief touchdown, no damage reported.
F2	Cook	42.1°N 88.02°W	1115	0.1 miles (0.2 km)	Brief touchdown.
F2	Cook	42.1°N 87.93°W	1120	2.5 miles (4.0 km)	1 Death 30 Injuries – Tornado unroofed homes and apartment buildings in the area. A trailer was destroyed as well.
Florida
F1	Jackson	30.8°N 85.23°W	1200	0.1 miles (0.2 km)	Brief touchdown caused minor damage.
FU	Jackson	30.8°N 85.23°W	1605	0.1 miles (0.2 km)	Brief touchdown, no damage reported. Tornado was confirmed but was not given an F-Scale intensity.
Michigan
F2	Barry	42.25°N 85.38°W	1400	2 miles (3.2 km)	Tornado caused moderate damage in the area.
New York
F0	Erie	42.63°N 78.55°W	2200	1 mile (1.6 km)	Brief touchdown caused minor damage.

=== June 10 event ===
List of reported tornadoes - Friday, June 10, 1966
F#	County	Coord.	Time (UTC)	Path length	Damage
Texas
F2	Swisher	34.35°N 101.73°W	0130	36.9 miles (59.4 km)	Long track tornado.
F1	Swisher	34.35°N 101.73°W	0130	2 miles (3.2 km)	Brief touchdown, no damage reported.
F0	Swisher	34.65°N 101.5°W	0130	2 miles (3.2 km)	Brief touchdown, no damage reported.

=== June 11 event ===
List of reported tornadoes - Saturday, June 11, 1966
F#	County	Coord.	Time (UTC)	Path length	Damage
Minnesota
F1	Minnesota	47.18°N 95.92°W	2115	1.9 miles (3.1 km)	Brief touchdown caused minor damage.
F4	Crow Wing, Cass	46.63°N 94.37°W	2300	72.8 miles (117.2 km)	Very long track half-mile-wide tornado completely leveled several farms, and damaged at least 20 others. Two homes sustained near F5-damage with only clean slabs remaining. Thousands of trees were snapped and 3 people were injured.
Iowa
F2	Polk	41.57°N 93.55°W	2345	12.2 miles (19.6 km)	
F2	Mitchell	43.38°N 92.9°W	0100	1 mile (1.6 km)	
F1	Marshall	41.83°N 92.97°W	0145	0.1 miles (0.2 km)	Brief touchdown caused minor damage.
F2	Boone	42.08°N 93.87°W	0230	2 miles (3.2 km)	
F1	Story	42.2°N 93.4°W	0300	2 miles (3.2 km)	Brief touchdown caused minor damage.

=== June 12 event ===
List of reported tornadoes - Sunday, June 12, 1966
F#	County	Coord.	Time (UTC)	Path length	Damage
Kansas
F1	Douglas	39.05°N 95.45°W	2201	0.1 miles (0.2 km)	Brief touchdown caused minor damage.
Missouri
F0	Clay	39.3°N 94.52°W	2245	0.1 miles (0.2 km)	Brief touchdown, no damage reported.
F1	Monroe	39.52°N 92.17°W	2330	0.2 miles (0.3 km)	Brief touchdown caused minor damage.
Texas
F3	Denton	33.3°N 97.0°W	0045	3.6 miles (5.8 km)	

=== Topeka, Kansas ===
Topeka, Kansas
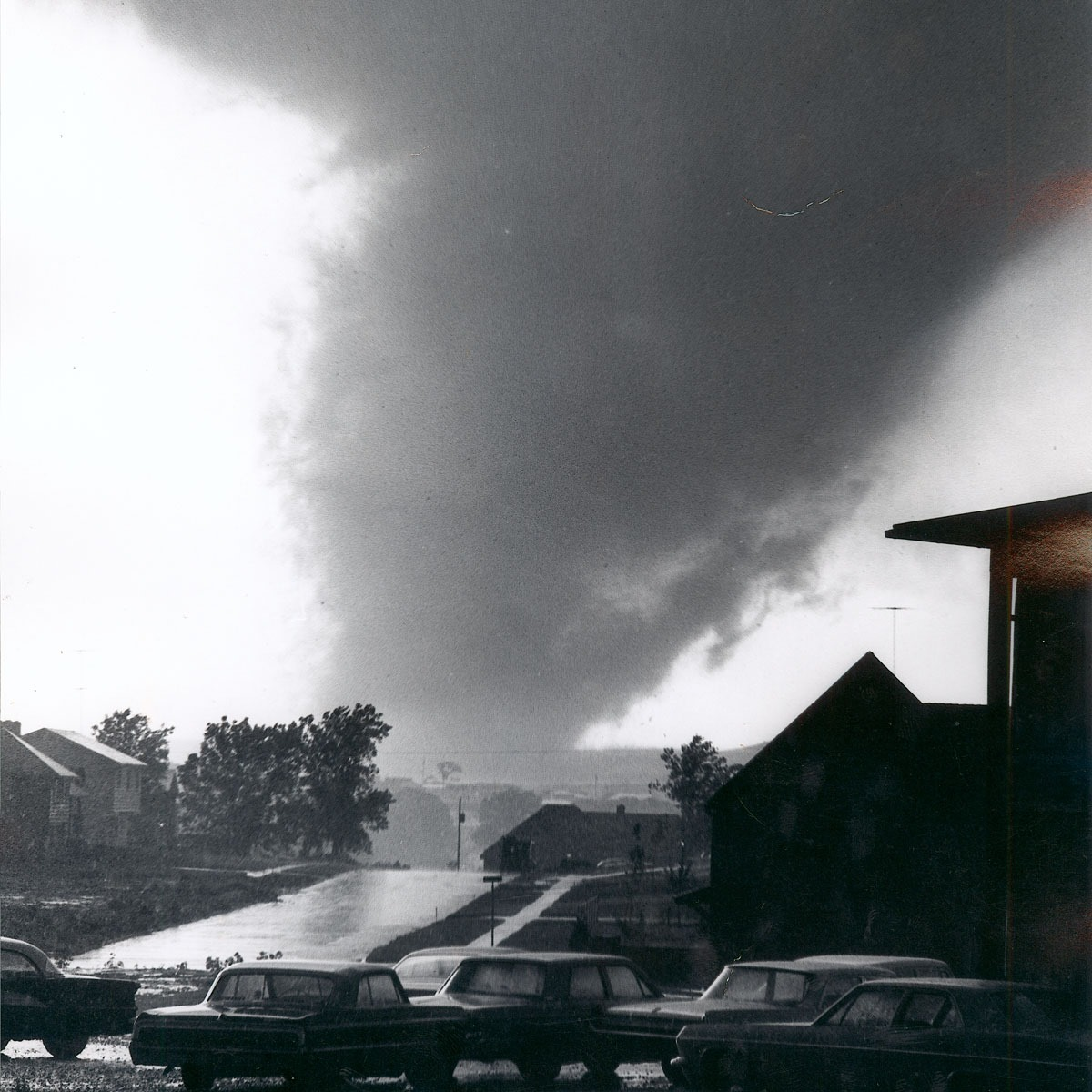
- The tornado as it was entering Topeka.

Meteorological history
- Formed: June 8, 1966 (7:03 PM CST)
- Dissipated: June 8, 1966 (7:29 PM CST)
- Duration: 26 minutes

F5 tornado
- on the Fujita scale
- Highest winds: >261 mph (420 km/h)

Overall effects
- Fatalities: 16
- Injuries: 550
- Damage: $100 million (1966 USD) $1 billion (2026 USD)
- Areas affected: Downtown Topeka, Kansas

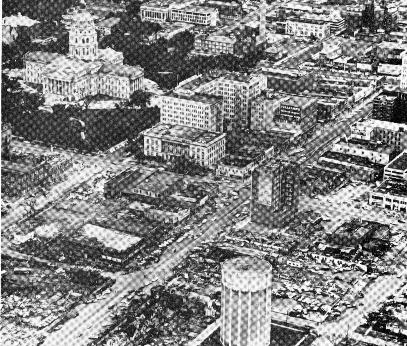
Damage to downtown Topeka, Kansas.

This violent tornado began developing at 6:55 p.m. Central Time on June 8, touching down 8 miles (13 km) west of the city. The National Weather Service could not detect the developing tornado on radar as the Topeka forecast office used a modified military radar that was donated by the U.S. government after World War II. While it was state-of-the-art for the time, it had limited ability to detect tornadic activity compared to Doppler weather radar. Around 7:30 p.m., a 1/4 to 1/2-mile (400–800 m) wide tornado tracked into the southwest side of town, moving northeast, and passed over Burnett's Mound. Bill Kurtis, then a fill-in reporter at WIBW-TV (channel 13; then a hybrid CBS/ABC/NBC affiliate, now CBS) delivered the message to take shelter from the devastating storm by telling viewers calmly but sternly, "for God's sake, take cover!"

After broadcasting a take-cover report on the air while driving down the winding road on Burnett's Mound with the tornado approaching his direction, Rick Douglass, a reporter for radio station WREN (1250 AM, now KYYS), attempted to take shelter under an overpass, while trying to do a second live report on the storm. Douglass was carried by the tornado, becoming airborne for a few seconds, and was dropped over one block away. Douglass, whose clothes were ripped from his body, was pushed by the strong winds along the ground until the tornado passed on to make a six-block swath across Topeka. Douglass was found with dirt and debris covering his body. When he arrived at an area hospital, a nurse placed a cover over Douglass's face – believing he had perished. In an interview with The History Channel's Wrath of God, Douglass stated that he then pulled off the cover, resulting in the attending nurse wincing in reaction, Douglass found shards of debris in his skin for several years after the tornado and was left with a smell he described in the interview as "a mix of blood, guts, wood and metal" for several weeks.

The tornado first struck residential areas, cleanly sweeping away entire rows of homes and hurling vehicles hundreds of yards through the air. Grass was scoured from the ground according to eyewitnesses. Washburn University took a direct hit, and many large stone buildings on campus were badly damaged or destroyed. A 300-pound section of stone wall was torn from one building and thrown two miles away. One vehicle on campus was reportedly lofted over the top of the university's ROTC building, before coming to rest on the 50-yard line of the football field. The tornado ripped through the central part of the city, hitting the downtown area. Buses were crushed when the transportation barn was collapsed by the tornado, and trains on the Santa Fe Railway were overturned. Most of the downtown buildings were badly damaged or had windows blown out. Cars were flipped and tossed, and streets were blocked with debris. Many workers at the AT&T building downtown took shelter after a co-worker warned them of the approaching tornado, which could not be heard through the soundproof operator's room. The building incurred only light damage. The Kansas State Capitol building was also damaged when debris struck the dome removing one of the copper panels.

As the storm raged through the downtown area, meteorologists at the National Weather Service Topeka forecast office, located at Philip Billard Municipal Airport, took shelter as the tornado tracked through the airport, flipping over several airplanes. At 7:29 p.m., 34 minutes after it touched down, the tornado dissipated after ripping through the airport. By this time, the tornado had traversed 22 miles (35 km) of the city, with a damage path width of 1/2 mile (800 m). The most intense damage occurred in residential areas on the east side of town, due to the closely spaced housing units. Homes and other buildings along the tornado's path were obliterated, and the National Weather Service Topeka forecast office years later rated the tornado at F5 on the Fujita scale.

Then-mayor Chuck Wright later issued a decree that those caught looting would be shot on sight. The Kansas National Guard was called in. Streets in devastated areas of the city were filled with sightseers checking out the ruins of homes and businesses, which hampered efforts from first responders to find those missing under rubble. Families of victims also came to the scene to try to find them.

A total of 820 homes were destroyed and 3,000 others were damaged. 250 businesses were destroyed and 2,390 were damaged including a major shopping center. 330 of the damaged homes and businesses suffered major damage and the other 5,000 received lesser degrees of damage. Hundreds of apartments were destroyed. Many government buildings, public buildings, other structures and much other property were damaged or destroyed.

Overall, 16 people were killed, and many others were injured. However, it is believed that had the tornado hit during school and work hours or during the night, that as many as 5,000 people would have been killed. Bill Kurtis was credited for saving many lives with his urgent message to take cover.

According to a local Native American legend, Burnett's Mound (a local landmark that was named after Potawatomi Indian chief Abram Burnett, and also believed to be an ancient Native American burial ground) was thought to protect the city from tornadoes, suggesting that the 250 feet (76 m) hill would cause a tornado that was approaching Topeka to disintegrate. A few years earlier, a water tower had been built directly on the mound, which sparked controversy among Topeka residents who felt it could impede the mound's reputed protective effect. Ten other tornadoes had struck the city since state records began in 1889, but the 1966 tornado was worse than any of the others.

== Casualties ==
Outbreak death toll
State	Total	County	County total
Kansas	17	Leavenworth	1
Kansas	17	Shawnee	16
Illinois	1	Cook	1
Totals	18		
All deaths were tornado-related

== See also ==
- List of North American tornadoes and tornado outbreaks
- List of tornadoes striking downtown areas

== Notes ==
Preceded by Worcester, MA (1953)	Costliest U.S. tornadoes on Record; June 8, 1966	Succeeded by Lubbock, TX (1970)
