= 1966 Jackson, Mississippi tornado =

F5 Tornado in Jackson, MS

1966 Jackson tornado
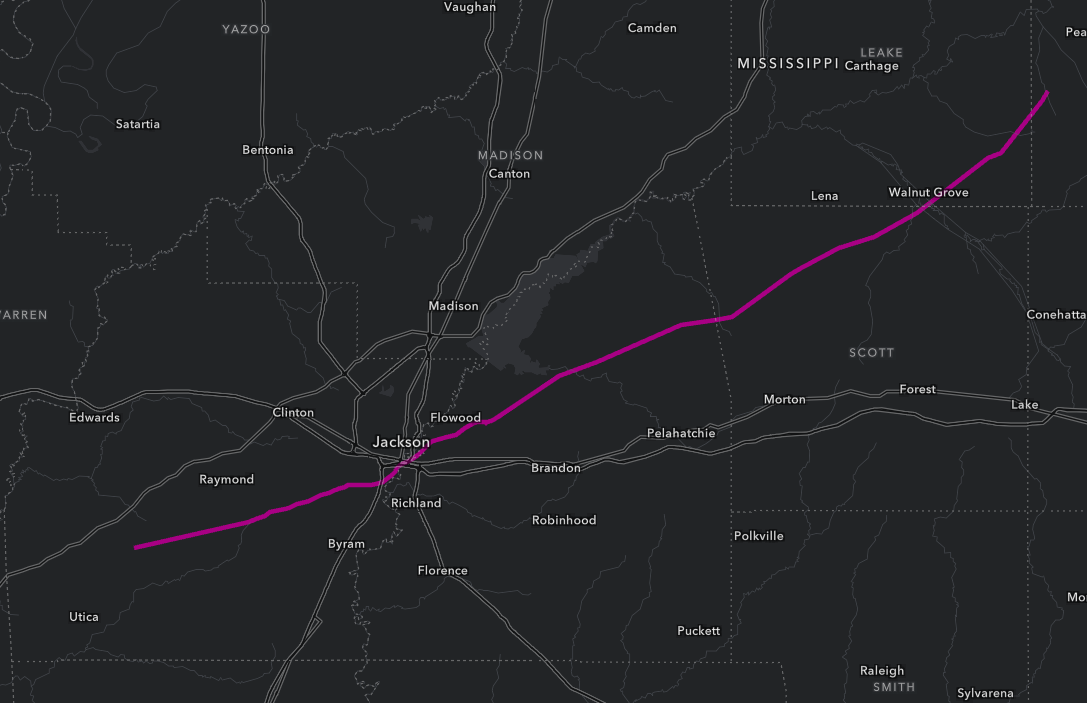
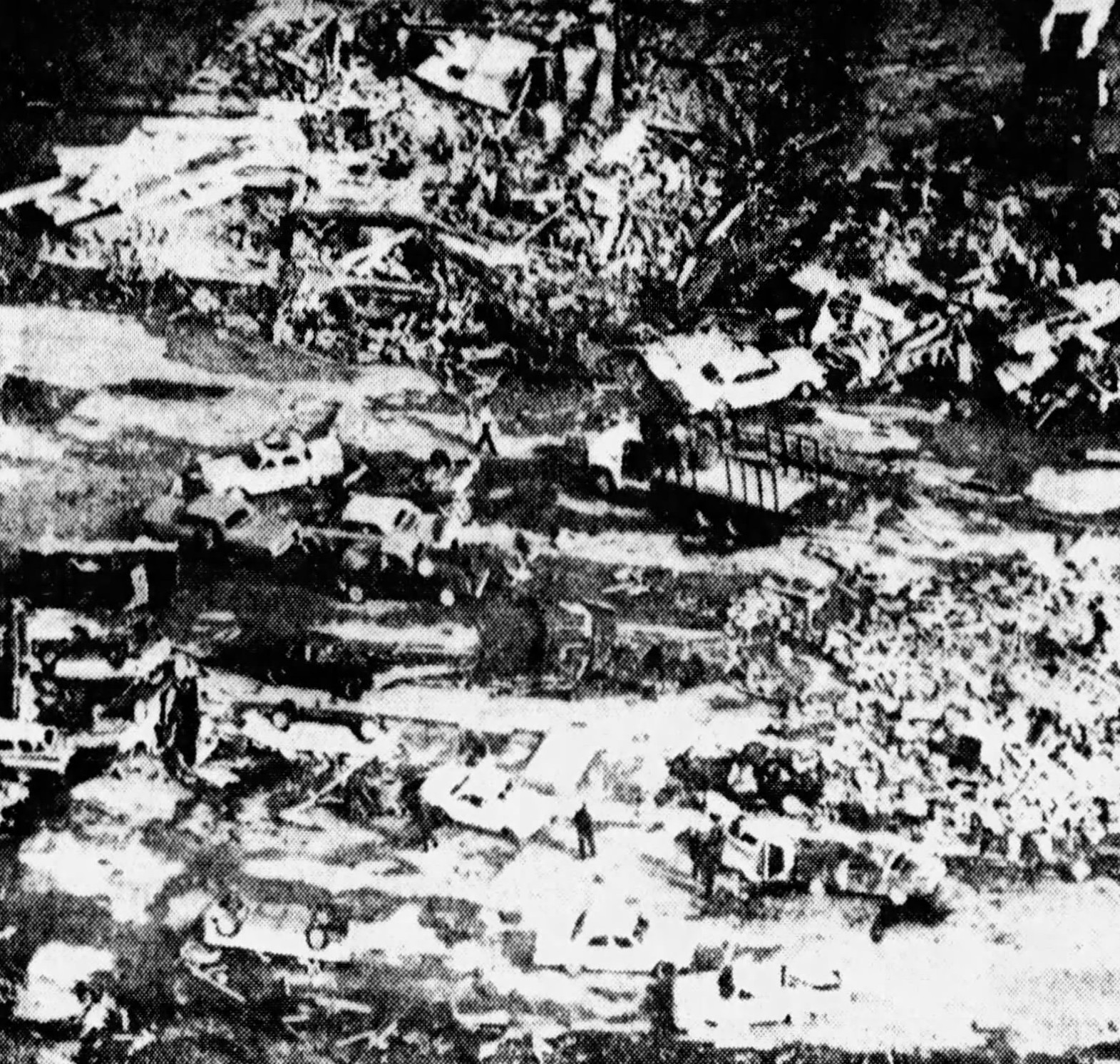
- Clockwise from Top: The rain-wrapped tornado as seen shortly after leaving Jackson; An aerial view of the Candlestick Park shopping center in Jackson after the tornado; The official National Weather Service track of the Jackson tornado.

Meteorological history
- Formed: March 3, 1966, 4:00 p.m. CST
- Dissipated: March 3, 1966, 6:00 p.m. CST (UTC−04:00)
- Duration: 2 hours

F5 tornado
- on the Fujita scale
- Highest winds: 261–318 mph (420–512 km/h)

Overall effects
- Fatalities: 57+
- Injuries: 518
- Damage: $75.5 million (1966 USD) $749 million (2025 USD)
- Areas affected: Hinds, Rankin, Scott, Leake, Neshoba, Kemper, Noxubee counties in Mississippi and Pickens, Tuscaloosa counties in Alabama
- Part of the Tornadoes of 1966

In the afternoon hours of March 3, 1966, a long-tracked and violent F5 tornado struck multiple counties in south-central Mississippi, primarily impacting the city of Jackson, Mississippi. The storm inflicted catastrophic damage in Mississippi and Alabama along a 202.5-mile (325.9 km) track. (Note: This is the official path length as listed in the National Climatic Data Center's severe weather database. However, the National Weather Service in Jackson, Mississippi, as well as other experts such as Thomas Grazulis says that this was a family of tornadoes.) The tornado killed at least 57, injured over 500, and caused $75.552 million in damage.

The tornado is commonly known as the Candlestick Park tornado after the name of a recently opened shopping center that was leveled by the storm.

== Meteorological synopsis ==
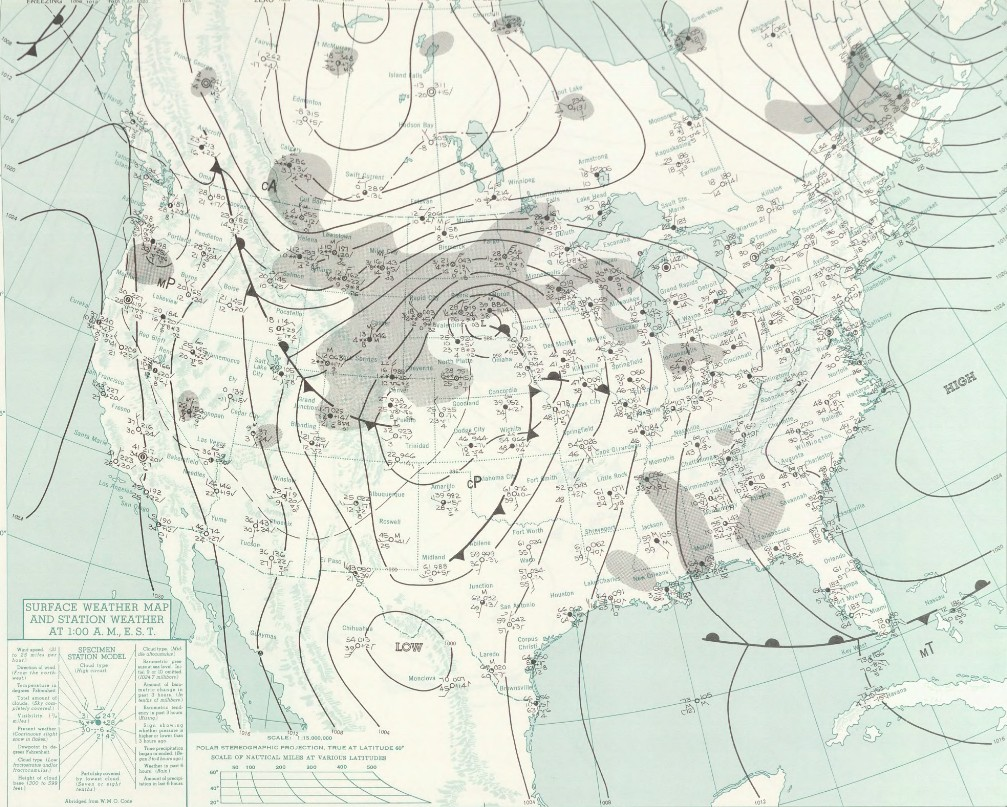
The Daily Weather map for March 3, 1966.

On Thursday, March 3, the atmosphere over Mississippi was ripe for a violent tornado. In the upper-levels of the troposphere, a fairly strong jet stream, with winds estimated at 140 to 150 miles per hour (230 to 240 km/h), oriented itself northeastward over the state, providing strong diffluence. A large mid-level trough, centered near Sioux Falls, South Dakota, was the overall system that produced the tornado. It featured low millibar heights roughly four times below the standard mean. Additionally, an unusually strong mid-level jet stream with 105 mph (169 km/h) winds provided additional energy to the storm system. The final factor in the development of the Candlestick Park storm was a subtle wind shift near the surface. At the higher levels, winds flowed from the southwest to the northeast in relation to the jet stream; however, closer to the surface, the inflow from the low pressure system over South Dakota resulted in a south to north flow, allowing for rotation within storms.

In the hours prior to the tornado forming, convective available potential energy (CAPE) values of over 1,500 J/kg were present, indicating moderate instability. However, dry air at higher levels created a capping inversion, limiting the number of thunderstorms that could develop. Later on, a warm front moved past Jackson, Mississippi, allowing more moist air into the region and increasing lapse rates. While this cap served to prevent a widespread tornado outbreak, it did allow for the formation of a few discrete strong storms. With this, a supercell thunderstorm developed over Louisiana and produced at least three tornadoes, including the large F5 tornado that moved through Mississippi and Alabama.

== Tornado Summary ==
=== Initial formation and rural Hinds County ===
The tornado first touched down in rural Hinds County, near the community of Adams south of Learned, Mississippi at around 4:00 p.m. CST. Tracking generally to the northeast, the tornado moved through mostly rural areas south of Raymond though several barns and a few homes were heavily damaged. The tornado demolished a homestead before toppling the recently constructed 1,900-foot (580 m) broadcast tower for Jackson television station WLBT just 50 feet above its base. The tornado crossed Midway Road before striking a home, killing three people. The tornado then twisted much of an AT&T Long Lines tower, with only two sections at the base remaining.

=== Jackson ===
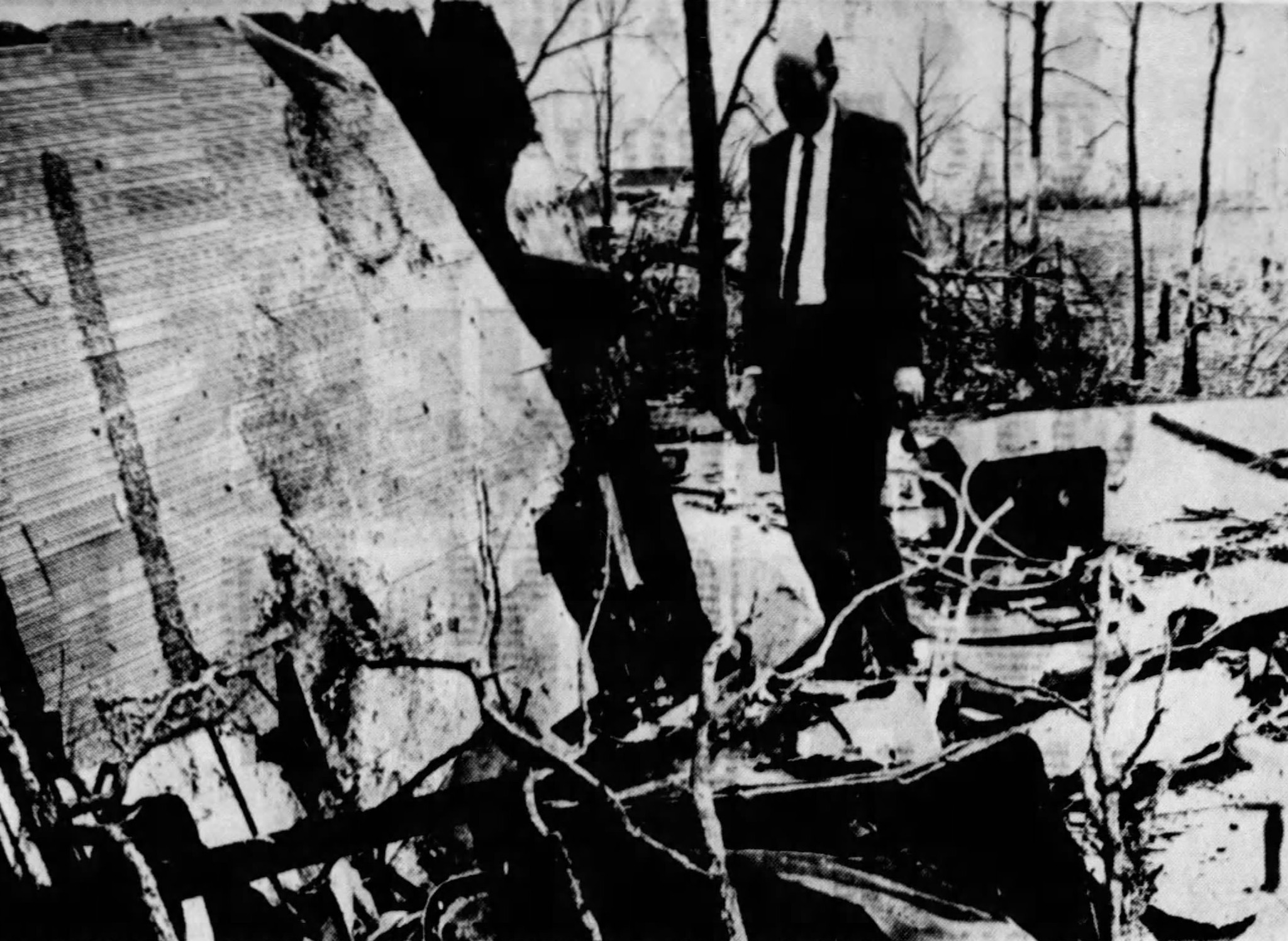
The pastor of the Woodville Heights Baptist Church looking through the ruins of the church after the tornado.

Around 4:30 p.m. CST, the storm approached the southern limits of Jackson, Mississippi. A large pecan orchard received heavy damage before the tornado damaged or destroyed multiple homes near the intersection of Forest Hill Road and Cooper Road, causing two more additional fatalities. The brick Woodville Heights Baptist Church and its neighboring parsonage were completely destroyed with such force that it seemingly "exploded" after the tornado directly struck. The tornado turned a home adjacent to Carter's Nursing home on its side before tornado began to move due east.

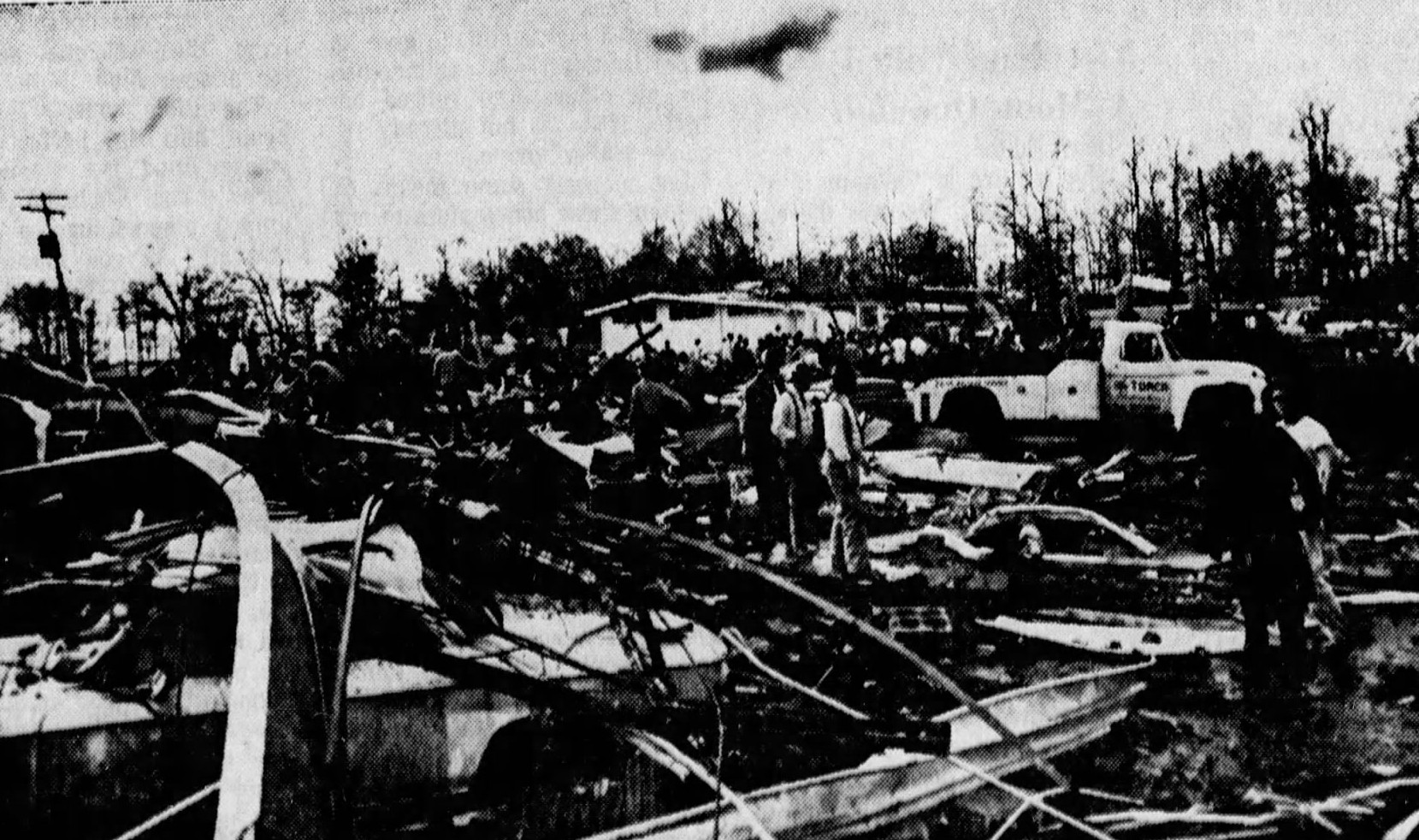
The ruins of the Candlestick Park shopping center after the tornado.

At 4:33 p.m. CST, the tornado directly struck the Candlestick Park shopping center, completely destroying every business, with all but one being completely flattened. Cinder-blocks from the structure were scattered for long distances, cars piled up on top of what was a small hamburger and hot dog restaurant, and at least 6 people in the shopping center were killed, with scores more injured. Eyewitness reported pavement scouring, and that a few cars were tossed upwards of one-half mile (0.80 km) by the tornado.

Just east of Candlestick Park, the Mississippi Power & Light Southwest Jackson Substation was heavily damaged, severing at least six transmission lines, and a bridge on Cooper near Oak Forest Drive was destroyed. Several homes near the Disciples of Christ Church were heavily damaged, with one home being flipped upside down on its foundation, and a strip mall along Cooper Road between Beatrice Drive and Rickay Drive was significantly damaged.

The tornado turned more northward as it approached the Pearl River and Rankin County.

=== Rankin County ===
As the tornado crossed the Pearl River, the tornado tore down utility poles and transmission lines, leaving the power lines tangled in the river. The Billups service station and cafe was struck as the tornado crossed Highway 80, damaging the structure before derailing at least six rail cars on the Illinois Central Railroad line. Star Super Market #10 on the north side of Brandon Road had windows blown out, and a couple of homes were lifted off the foundation before being set back down intact. Debris from structures were scattered into the basin of an old river channel, now the modern location of Crystal Lake.

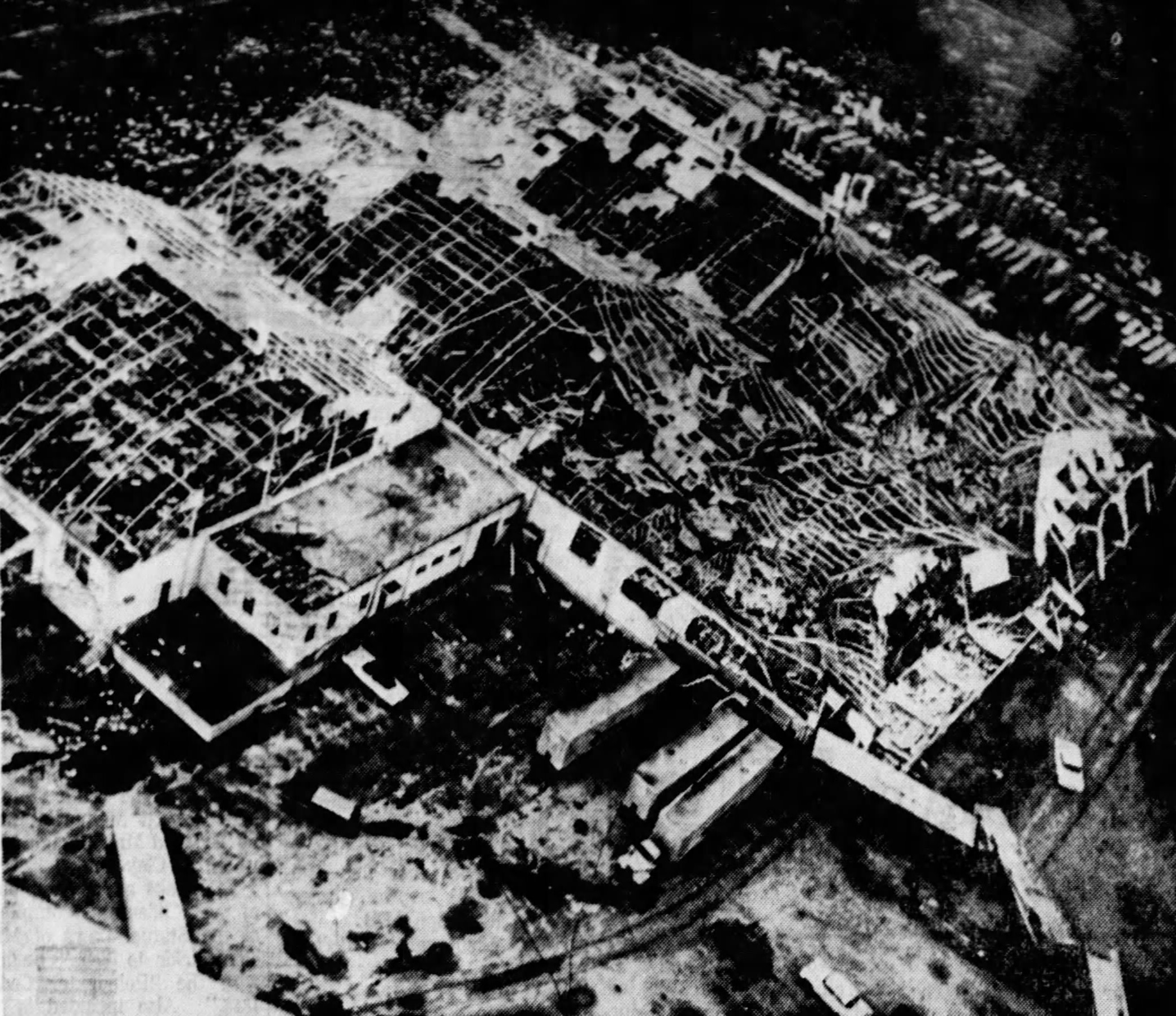
An aerial view of the Continental Can Company in the Flowood indistrual area after the tornado.

The tornado then struck the Flowood industrial Area, first striking the Jackson Tile Manufacturing Company, heavily damaging several buildings and collapsing a water tower. Just to the north, the Continental Can Company was also heavily damaged. Next, the Knox Glass Bottle Company had its warehouse and manufacturing structures heavily damaged. Multiple more buildings were damaged or destroyed at the Cataphote Corporation, a manufacturer of glass signs and beads. As the tornado crossed Fannin Road, 5 vehicle related fatalities occurred. Two vehicles were tossed 100 yards from the road. One person seeking refuge in a ditch was also killed.

At around 4:45 p.m. CST, the tornado struck the Mississippi Air National Guard base on the northern end of the Jackson Municipal Airport. One building had its walls torn down while an Aeronca aircraft that was tied down was destroyed. A 60 mph wind gust was measured at the Jackson Weather Bureau Office in the terminal building around 1 mile to the south. Based on eyewitness testimony, and times observed by meteorologists, the tornado was estimated to be moving at around 60 miles per hour at this time.

The tornado then tracked over rural areas of Rankin County, dotted by sporadic houses and farms. A home was damaged and transmission lines were severed near Brandon-Luckney Road. Two trailer homes near the Ross Barnett Reservoir were destroyed, and a neighboring home had its north wall and roof structure removed. Another trailer home was stripped off the floor structure and scattered for several acres. At least two more homes along Holly Bush Road were completely destroyed,

The tornado reached peak F5 intensity near the community of Leesburg. A frame home and a tenant house were completely destroyed, with three fatalities occurring within the tenant house. A home along Highway 43 was lifted off its foundation, with the resident being thrown 200 yards away, and several cattle were killed. The Bilbro store sustained heavy damage, and the Rankin County Health Department branch office was swept clean off of its foundation. A home and barn nearby were destroyed, along with two chicken houses. The tornado paralleled MS Highway 481, destroying or sweeping away several homes and barns. The tornado scoured a quarter mile of pavement from a road, and many large white oak trees were ripped from their roots and thrown long distances before the tornado crossed into Scott County.

=== Scott County ===
As the tornado crossed into Scott County, a home was completely destroyed, killing all six occupants, all from one family. The tornado then struck the community of Branch, where cars were thrown off of roads and 7 people were killed, including one who was thrown into a pond and later drowned. The tornado then crossed over MS Highway 13, throwing two cars off the road resulting in 3 deaths, one car was thrown into a ditch, while the other car was thrown 200 yards away. A newly constructed brick home was then almost completely destroyed, with only one wall left partially standing. Two tenant houses and multiple chicken houses were also destroyed. The tornado then destroyed at least 8 houses in the community of Balucta along Hillsboro Ludlow Road, resulting in 8 deaths. The tornado then entered the community of Midway, destroying the Lillian Missionary Baptist and Free Will Baptist Churches, and damaging the North Scott School. More homes in Midway were destroyed, resulting in 2 more deaths. Then the tornado struck the community of Pea Ridge, destroying multiple homes, barns, and chicken houses, claiming 1 life. The tornado also threw a truck 100 yards into a pasture.

=== Leake and Neshoba Counties ===
The tornado crossed into Leake County along MS 35, impacting the communities of impacting the Rosebud and Madden. Multiple farm buildings and homes were destroyed, as well as damaging the Zion Baptist and Zion Methodist churches. Four people in Leake County were killed.

The tornado then crossed into Neshoba County, striking the community of Dowdville. At least 10 homes were damaged or destroyed in Dowdville, claiming 1 life, before destroying the old Carolina Church, built in 1841, and damaging the new church. The tornado then rapidly weakened, and according to eyewitness and local reports, the tornado lifted in western Neshoba County at around 6:00 p.m. CST.

In total, at least 57 people were killed by the tornado across an approximately 84 mile long path.

=== Preston, Mississippi - Coker, Alabama tornadoes ===
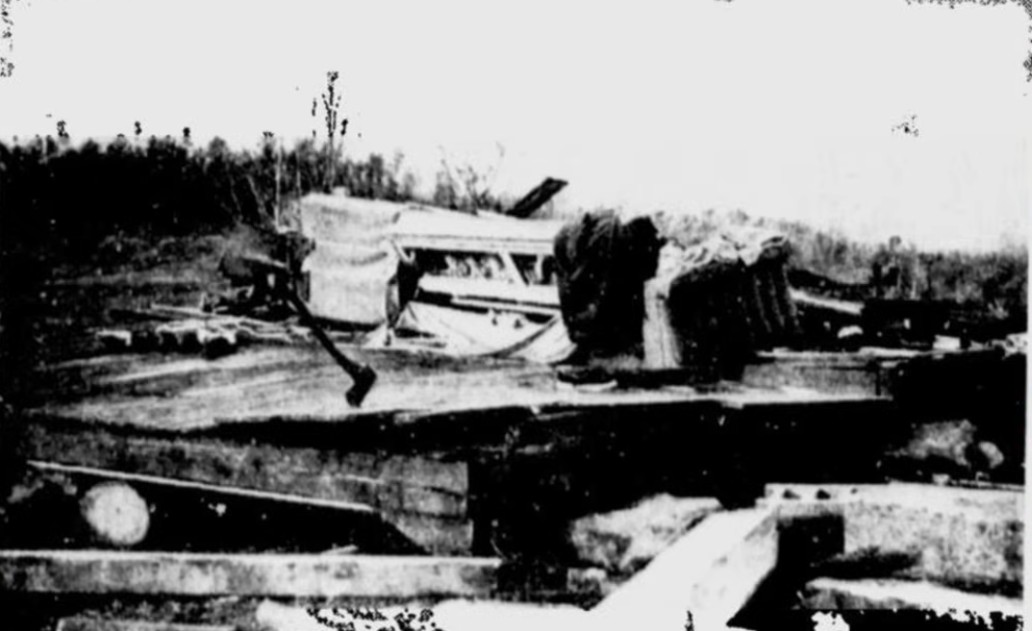
A destroyed home near Coker, Alabama after the tornado. One fatality occurred at this home.

The parent supercell then produced another tornado after passing over Philadelphia and crossed into Kemper County. Downing trees in the area of Preston, Mississippi and damaging over a dozen homes in eastern Mississippi.

The parent supercell then cycled again shortly after crossing the Alabama border. A tornado touched down in rural Pickens County, producing significant damage as it tracked through Pickens and Tuscaloosa Counties at F2 intensity. Several homes in both counties sustain damage, with at least 20 houses and 6 barns destroyed, and another 20 homes and 15 barns heavily damaged. At around 7:00 p.m. CST, the tornado tore through the western edge of Coker, Alabama, claiming 1 life after the tornado completely destroyed a home. The tornado kept tracking northeast before lifting north of Tuscaloosa, Alabama at around 7:45 p.m. CST. The tornado tracked approximately 50 miles, claimed one life and injured a further 21.

== Other tornadoes ==
Confirmed tornadoes by Fujita rating
FU	F0	F1	F2	F3	F4	F5	Total
0	0	3	0	0	0	0	3

List of confirmed tornadoes – March 3–4, 1966 (Note: All dates are based on the local time zone where the tornado touched down; however, all times are in Coordinated Universal Time and dates are split at midnight CST/CDT for consistency.) (Note: Prior to 1994, only the average widths of tornado paths were officially listed.)
F#	Location	County / Parish	State	Start coord.	Date	Time (UTC)	Path length	Max. width	Summary
F1	N of Newellton	Tensas	LA	32.03°N 91.20°W	Mar. 3	21:00–?	1 mile (1.6 km)	233 yards (213 m)	A tornado accompanied by heavy rain touched down near LA 888 and moved north-northeastward, destroying a barn and a home while damaging another barn and another home. Power lines and poles were damaged and the back glass was blown out of an automobile as well. One person was injured and damage was estimated at $2,500.
F1	Gardendale	Jefferson	AL	33.65°N 86.82°W	Mar. 3	02:00–?	0.1 miles (0.16 km)	10 yards (9.1 m)	Brief but destructive tornado obliterated a brick home, injuring the two residents. Seven other homes were damaged as well. Losses total $25,000.
F1	NE of Clarkton	Bladen	NC	34.50°N 78.63°W	Mar. 4	14:00–?	0.3 miles (0.48 km)	50 yards (46 m)	A weak but damaging tornado tore the roof off of a knitting mill and damaged the roof of a warehouse. Several parked automobiles were damaged as well. A roaring sound was heard as this tornado, which was accompanied by heavy rain, passed by. Damages totaled $25,000.

== Aftermath and historic perspective ==
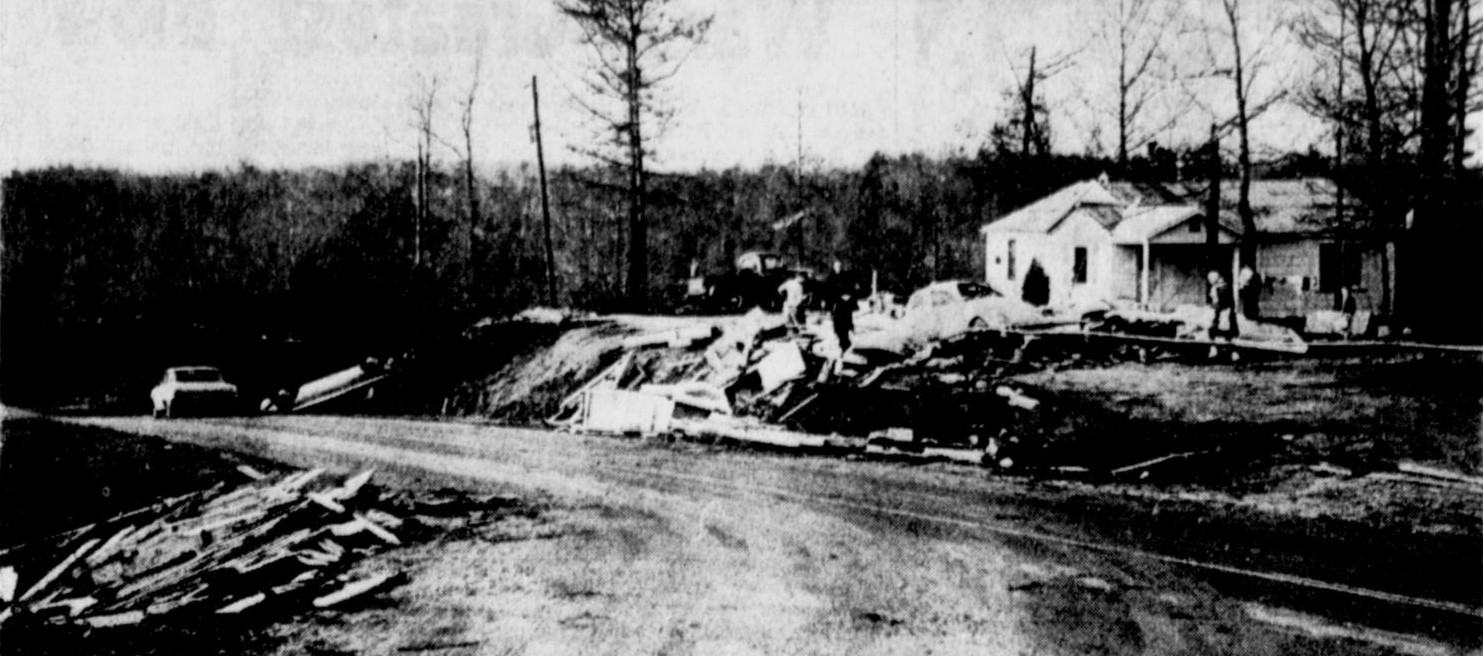
A building destroyed near Coker, Alabama.

In the immediate aftermath of the tornado, long distance telephone service in the Jackson area was lost for several hours in the immediate aftermath of the tornado. Throughout Mississippi, damage from the tornado amounted to $75 million (1966 USD) ($744 million (2025 USD)). The most severe damage took place at the Candlestick Park shopping center in southern Jackson where 12 people were killed. Much of the building was leveled and only one wall remained standing.

For many years, a memorial stood at the site of a home in Scott County where a family of 6 people were killed.

Prior to the Candlestick Park tornado, there had only been one other F5 (the other occurring on December 5, 1953) to touch down in Mississippi. It was the most recent F/EF5 tornado in Mississippi until April 27, 2011, when two EF5 tornadoes touched down near the towns of Philadelphia and Smithville. Overall, the tornado ranks as the second-deadliest and longest-tracked in the state's history, having killed 57-58 and traveled 202.5 mi (325.9 km); however, excluding outside portions of the track, it ranks third. In general, it is also regarded as one of the most devastating tornadoes to ever strike Mississippi.

In the decades following the tornado, reassessments on the history of the storm have been made; most notably the Jackson, Mississippi branch of the National Weather Service and meteorologist Thomas P. Grazulis both indicate that there were two separate tornadoes. Based on reports from residents who experienced the tornado, a second one formed as the original dissipated, a common occurrence in cycling supercell thunderstorms. Though there is agreement on this feature, the results have not been implemented into the National Climatic Data Center's severe weather database, thus it is still officially considered one tornado. According to the study by Grazulis, the tornado dissipated over Leake County and a second tornado, estimated at F2 strength, touched down in Pickens County, Alabama.

On the 50th anniversary of the tornado, the National Weather Service in Jackson published a section on the tornado titled "If the Tornado Happened Today," briefly detailing the scale of damage in relation to new development just to the east of Jackson in the communities of Pearl and Flowood. Given exactly the same path that took place in 1966, the death toll could've been considerably higher. Striking at rush hour, numerous vehicles were in the path of the tornado as it crossed Interstates 20 and 55 as well as US 80 and MS 25. Despite vastly improved warning systems, the population density of Jackson's eastern suburbs leaned towards a higher likelihood of fatalities.

== See also ==
- List of F5 and EF5 tornadoes
- List of North American tornadoes and tornado outbreaks
- 1971 Inverness tornado - The next F5 tornado to strike Mississippi.
