= Annie Le Porte Diggs =

American journalist

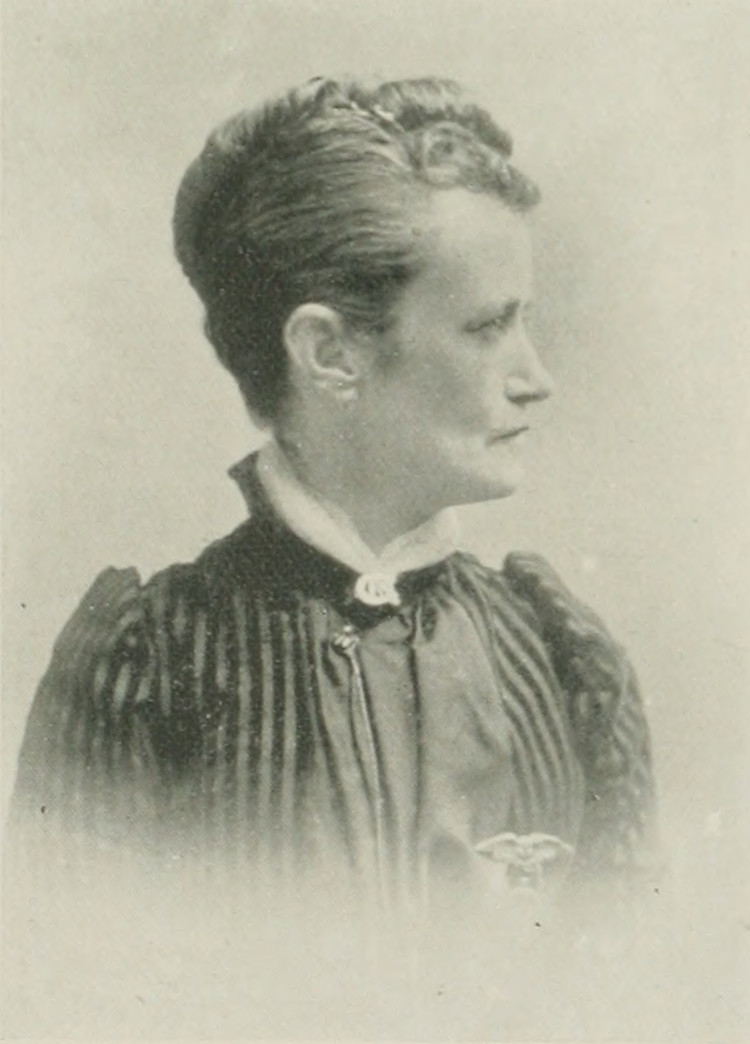
- Photo in A Woman of the Century
- Born: Ann Maria Thomas LePorte; February 22, 1853; London, Canada West
- Died: September 7, 1916 (aged 63); Detroit, Michigan
- Citizenship: Canadian, American
- Occupations: activist; journalist; author; librarian
- Spouse: Alvin S. Diggs (m. 1873)
- Writing career
- Genres: poetry; prose; non-fiction

Annie Le Porte Diggs (née, Le Porte; February 22, 1853 – September 7, 1916) was a Canadian-born American activist, journalist, author, and librarian. She was the chairman of the delegation from Washington, D.C. for the National People's Party Convention, in Omaha, in 1892. It was the first time a woman ever led a delegation at a national political convention. She was a speaker for the People's Party in nearly every state and territory. She served as state librarian of Kansas, 1898–1902. A writer, Diggs served as the associate editor of The Advocate, Topeka, Kansas, and was the author of Little Brown Brothers and the Story of Jerry Simpson. Diggs died in 1916 in Michigan.

== Early life and education ==
Annie Le Porte was born in London, Ontario, Canada, February 22, 1853 (February 22, 1848 is also mentioned), the daughter of Cornelius, a lawyer, and Ann Maria (Thomas) Le Porte. Her ancestry can be traced in a direct line to General John Stark, of the American Revolutionary War.

In 1855, the family removed to New Jersey where Diggs studied with a governess, and also received education at a convent and public schools.

== Career ==
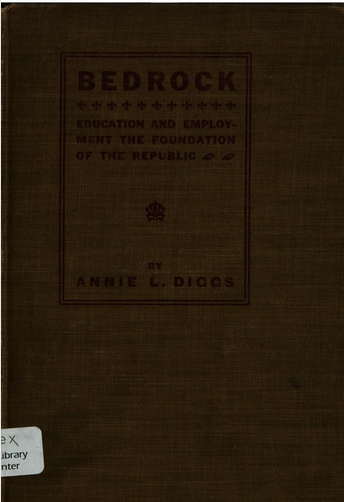
Bedrock; Education and Employment

On September 21, 1873, after finishing school and moving to Kansas she married Alvin S. Diggs, a postal clerk of Lawrence, Kansas. She then began her career in public as a journalist, publishing the Kansas Liberal with her husband from their home in Lawrence. She entered the field to fight for political and personal independence and equality. Diggs also lectured before literary, reformatory and religious assemblages. She lectured on sociology.

When the Farmers' Alliance movement among the western farmers began, she entered the field and soon found herself at the front among those who were engineering that industrial movement. During the political campaigns in Kansas and neighboring states, she made many speeches. She was chosen by the People's Party to reply to the platform utterances of John James Ingalls, which largely contributed to his overthrow. She was elected national secretary of the National Citizens' Industrial Alliance, at the annual meeting of that organization in St. Louis, Missouri, February 22, 1892.

In 1881, she addressed the annual convention of the Free Religious Association, in Boston, Massachusetts, on "Liberalism in the West." For years, she was a member of the Woman's Christian Temperance Union (WCTU). Much of her journalistic work was done on the Advocate, the organ of the Citizens' Alliance, on which journal she served as the leading editorial writer. She spent much time in Washington, D.C., after the upheaval caused by the Alliance, and did notable work in correspondence for the western newspapers.

Diggs served as president of multiple organizations including Woman's Alliance of the District of Columbia, the Kansas Woman's Free Silver League (1897), the Kansas Equal Suffrage Association (1899), and the Kansas Woman's Press Association. She was a delegate to the International Cooperative Congress, in Manchester. England, 1903, and the Peace congress, Rouen, France, 1904.

== Personal life ==
Their family consisted of two daughters, Mabel and Ester, and one son, Fred. In religion, she was a radical Unitarian.

While living in Lawrence, Diggs superintended the hatching and partial raising of silk-worms fed upon the leaves of the Osage orange, which resulted in nearly 2,000,000 healthy silk-worms produced in the summer of 1883. Some were sent to Corinth, Mississippi, and others were colonized in different parts of the country. She was the author of Silk raising in Kansas: instruction book (1883).

Diggs died September 7, 1916, in Detroit, Michigan.

== Commemoration ==
A painting by Phyllis Garibay-Coon depicting her and other Kansas suffragists was unveiled at the Kansas Statehouse in January 2025. It is titled "Rebel Women" and is the first art installation by any woman artist to be in the Kansas Statehouse.

== Selected works ==
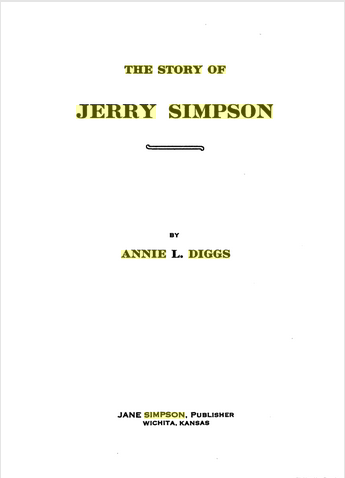
The Story of Jerry Simpson

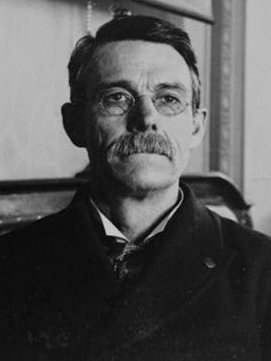
Jerry Simpson

- 1883, Silk raising in Kansas : instruction book
- 1899, Little brown brother
- 1900, Stephen McLallin
- 1902, Catalogue of the law books in the Kansas State library
- 1908, The story of Jerry Simpson
- 1912, Bedrock : education and employment, the foundation of the republic
