= Hermit's Cave on Belfry Hill =

- U.S. National Register of Historic Places
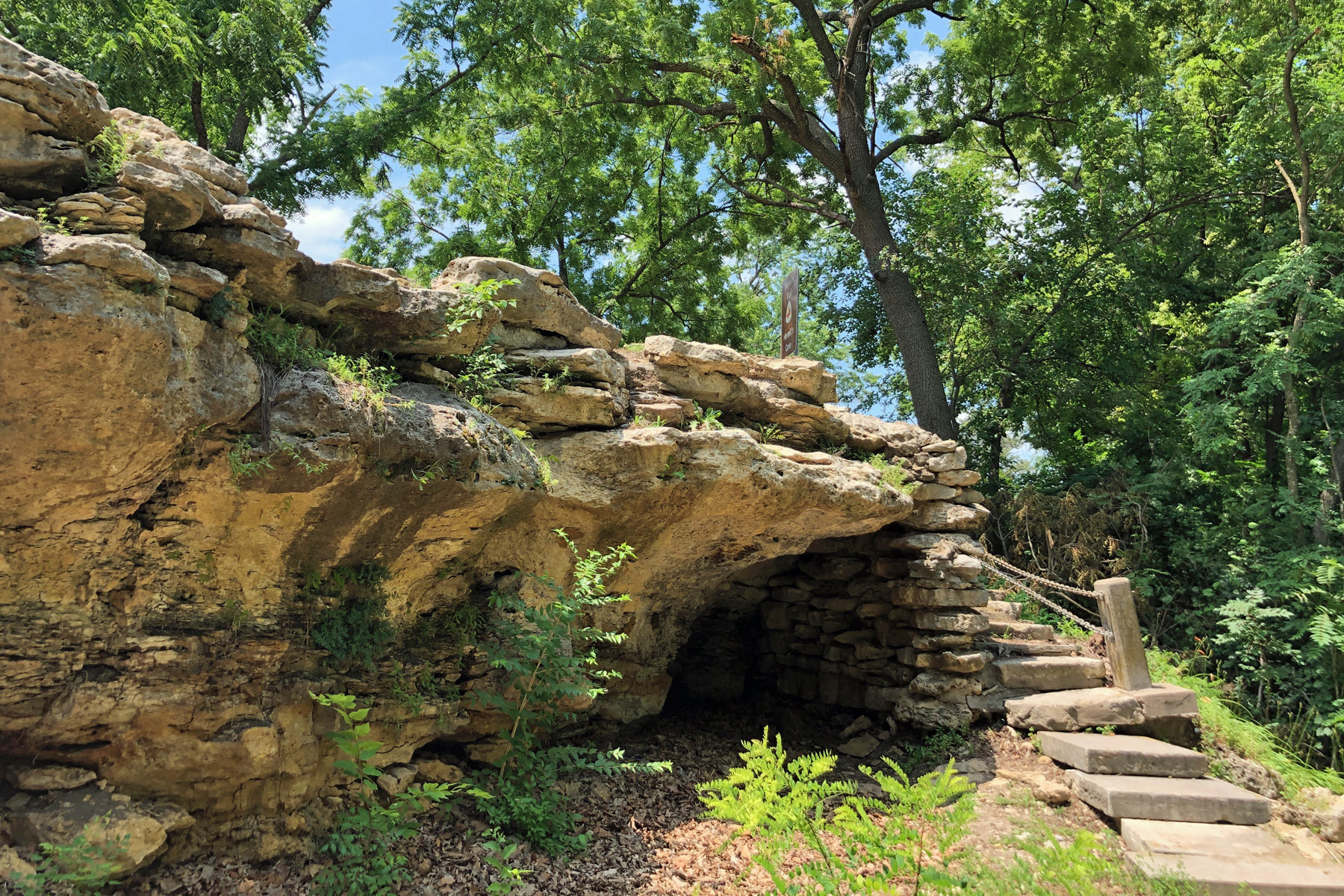

- Location within Kansas
- Location: East of N. Belfry St., generally from Columbia to Conn Sts., Council Grove, Kansas
- Coordinates: 38°39′44″N 96°29′39″W
- Built: 1901
- NRHP reference No.: 15000148
- Added to NRHP: April 14, 2015

Hermit's Cave on Belfry Hill is a public park on Belfry Hill in Council Grove, Kansas. Council Grove established the park in 1901 due to the efforts of local booster Kate Aplington, who led private development and cleanup efforts on what had been poorly maintained city land. Aplington promoted the park by spreading its alleged connections to the Santa Fe Trail through two of its landmarks, Hermit's Cave and the bell tower from which Belfry Hill took its name.

According to newspaperman John Maloy, in 1863, an Italian Roman Catholic priest lived as a hermit for five months in a cave west of Council Grove. Maloy's story was not published until 1890, and only one contemporary reference to the hermit has been found in local publications, shedding doubt on the historical accuracy of the story. Another local writer, Henry Inman, added to the story, and its popularity led locals to recognize the cave on Belfry Hill as the Hermit's Cave site. The bell tower on the hill came to Council Grove in 1863; the city purchased it from a church in Lawrence for use as a church and school bell. Later accounts added the detail that the bell was used to warn residents of Native American raids on white settlers, though this has since been disproven. The bell tower was destroyed in a wind storm in 1884, and a local used the bell as a flower pot until Aplington rebuilt the tower in 1901; she dedicated the new tower to assassinated U.S. President William McKinley.

As auto tourism along historic routes like the Santa Fe Trail became popular in the early twentieth century, Council Grove began attracting tourists interested in its history as the onetime beginning of the trail. The alleged trail landmarks in the Belfry Hill park became part of local tourism efforts; for instance, when the local women's club hosted a regional meeting in 1907, it included a carriage tour of the park and other nearby trail sites. Upon the Santa Fe Trail's centennial in 1921, local boosters again invested in developing the park, adding a stone stairway to make the cave more accessible. The city also added historical markers at eleven of its Santa Fe Trail landmarks, including Hermit's Cave. Local tourist material, along with the Works Progress Administration's 1939 guide to Kansas, continued to bolster the park's reputation as a city landmark and tourist destination.

The park was added to the National Register of Historic Places on April 14, 2015.
