= Anna C. Wait =

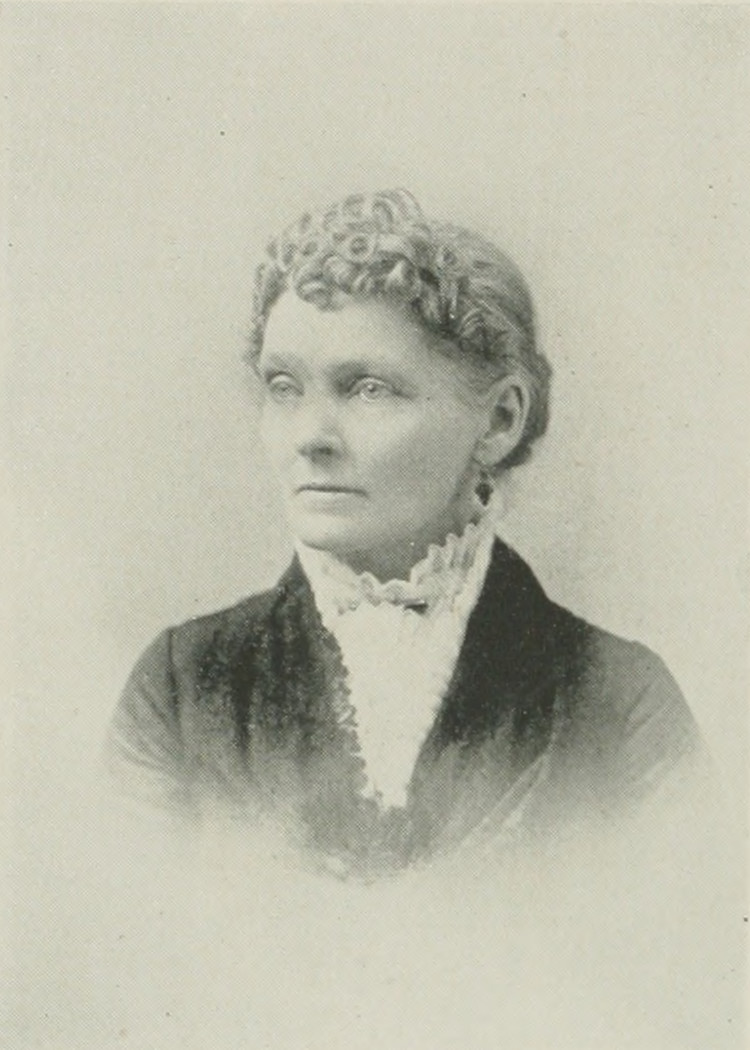
- Born: Anna Amelia Churchill; March 26, 1837; Medina County, Ohio, US
- Died: May 9, 1916 (aged 79); Lincoln County, Kansas, US
- Spouse: Walter Scott Wait (m. 1857; died in 1900)

Anna Amelia Churchill Wait (1837–1916) was active in the suffrage movement in Kansas. She is known for establishing an Equal Suffrage Association branch.

== Life ==
Wait née Churchill was born on March 26, 1837, in Medina County, Ohio. In 1857 she married Walter Scott Wait with whom she had one child. The couple moved to Missouri. With outbreak of the Civil War, Walter became part of the Company H, Fiftieth Illinois Volunteer Infantry in the Union Army. During Walter's three years of service Anna and her son lived in Ohio where Anna earned a living as a teacher. After Walter's return the family moved first to Indiana in 1869, and to Kansas in 1871, settling in Lincoln County in 1872.

Wait was active in the suffrage movement in Kansas. In 1879 Wait, along with Emily J. Briggs and Sarah E. Lutes established the district branch of the Equal Suffrage Association. In 1884 a Kansas Equal Suffrage Association was formed and Wait served as vice-president at large. In 1911 Wait was elected president of the Sixth District of the Equal Suffrage Association.

Wait died on May 9, 1916, in Lincoln County, Kansas.

== Legacy ==
Wait was included in the 1893 publication A Woman of the Century.

A painting by Phyllis Garibay-Coon depicting her and other Kansas suffragists was unveiled at the Kansas Statehouse in January 2025. It is titled "Rebel Women" and is the first art installation by any woman artist to be in the Kansas Statehouse.

== See also ==
- List of suffragists and suffragettes
