= Kate Aplington =

American novelist (1859–1928)

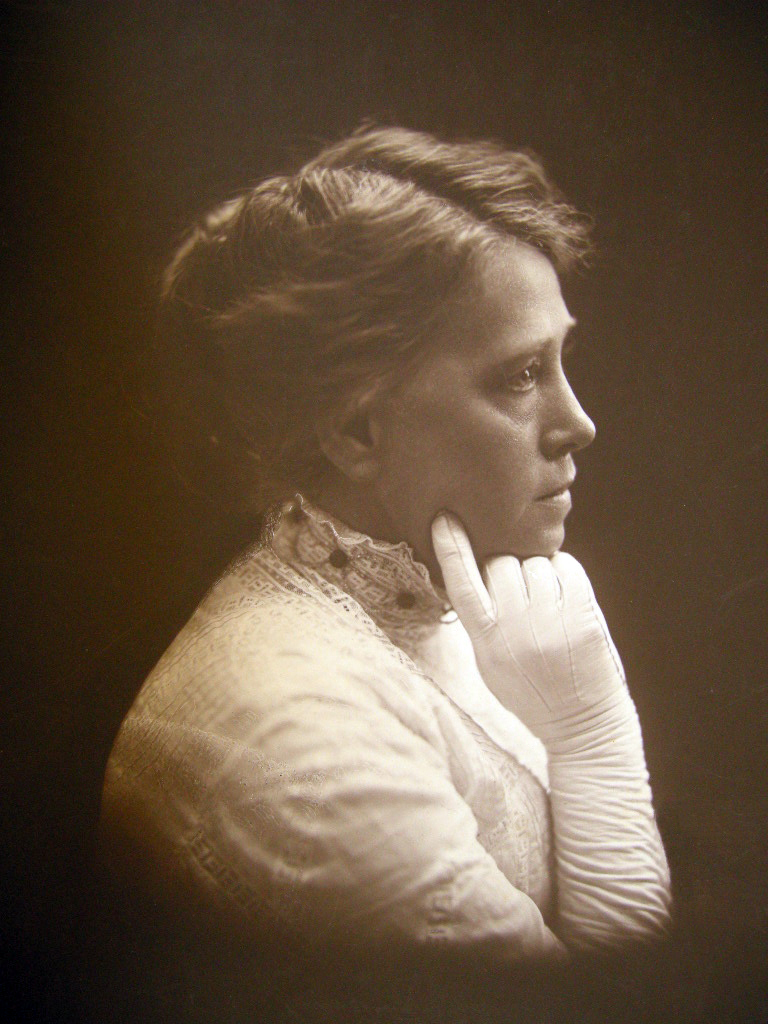
- Born: March 1, 1859
- Died: September 26, 1928 (aged 69); Miami
- Occupation: Writer

Kate Adele Aplington (née Smith; March 1, 1859 – September 26, 1928) was an American novelist, photographer, painter, suffragist, and clubwoman.

She was born Kate Adele Smith, the daughter of Henry H. Smith, a school superintendent, and Elizabeth Melinda (Deming) Smith. She graduated from Polo High School in Polo, Illinois. She taught high school herself briefly at Ottawa High School in Ottawa, Illinois. In 1879, she married John Aplington, a lawyer, and they moved to Council Grove, Kansas the next year.

In Council Grove, Kate Aplington operated a photography studio. She was active in many civic causes. She served as recording secretary of the Kansas Equal Suffrage Association. She worked to preserve Hermit's Cave on Belfry Hill as a public park. She established the Aplington Art Gallery or the Kansas State Art Collection, a collection of art prints that toured the state of Kansas. In 1913, the Aplingtons moved to Florida, and Kate Aplington engaged in similar civic work in Miami, Florida.

Her novel Pilgrim of the Plains: A Romance of the Santa Fe Trail (1913) is the diary of Delia Randall, a girl travelling in a prairie caravan in the 1830s. At the time of her death, she had completed a book about Florida, The Strangler Tree.

Kate Adele Aplington died on September 26, 1928, aged 69, in Miami, Florida, aged .

== Bibliography ==
- Pilgrim of the Plains: A Romance of the Santa Fe Trail (1913)
