= Mamie Dillard =

American educator, clubwoman and suffragist

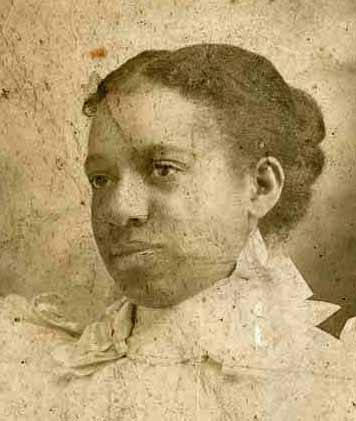
- Born: Mary Jane Dillard; September 10, 1874; Lawrence, Kansas
- Died: November 24, 1954 (aged 80); Lawrence, Kansas
- Resting place: Oak Hill Cemetery
- Education: Kansas University, University of Kansas
- Occupation: Educator

Mary "Mamie" J. Dillard (September 10, 1874 – November 25, 1954) was an American educator, clubwoman and suffragist.

== Early life ==
Mary J. Dillard was born on September 10, 1874, in Lawrence, Kansas. She was born to Fannie B. Dillard and Jesse Dillard, both born in Virginia and illiterate. When the family moved to Kansas in the 1870s, Jesse worked as a messenger for the Leavenworth, Lawrence, and Galveston Railroad Company and as a janitor at the Lawrence National Bank Building.

== Education and community activism ==
Dillard graduated from Lawrence High School in 1892 and was the only African American in her class. As part of the ceremony she delivered a speech in support of the Women's Christian Temperance Union. She joined the segregated WCTU at the age of 18 and promoted the organization's work in Women's Suffrage. In 1896 she received a bachelor's degree from Kansas University and went on to start her career as a teacher at the segregated Pinckney Elementary School in Lawrence. One of her students in the early twentieth century was Langston Hughes, whom she befriended and corresponded with for years after he left Kansas. One letter between Hughes and Dillard survives and can be found in the Beinecke Rare Book and Manuscript Library in New Haven, Connecticut.

From 1909 to 1913, Dillard attended graduate school at the University of Kansas where she studied English and special education. She then became the principal of the segregated elementary school, the Lincoln School. In 1916, she attended the Negro National Educational Congress as an appointed delegate from Kansas.

Dillard was an active clubwoman. She was a member of the African-American Woman's Christian Temperance Union, joining at the age of 18. She was also a member of the Double Six Club, the Home and Garden Club, the Self Culture Club, and the Sierra Leone Club. She was involved as a patron of the University of Kansas chapter of the Delta Sigma Theta sorority. Dillard was also a suffrage activist, working with Carrie Langston to advocate for African-American women to become involved with the suffrage movement.

Dillard died on November 24, 1954, in Lawrence, where she had lived her entire life.

== Commemoration ==
A painting by Phyllis Garibay-Coon depicting her and other Kansas suffragists was unveiled at the Kansas Statehouse in January 2025. It is titled "Rebel Women" and is the first art installation by any woman artist to be in the Kansas Statehouse.

== See also ==
- List of American suffragists
- List of African American suffragists
