= Lilla Day Monroe =

Pioneer

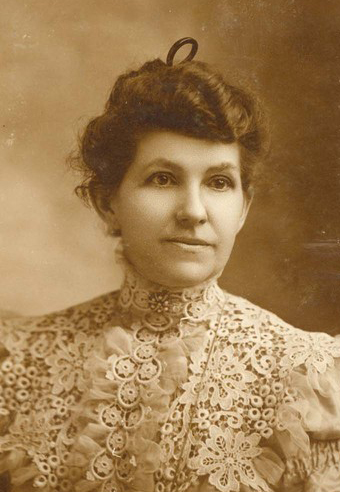
- Born: Lilla Day Moore; November 11, 1858; Mooresburg, Indiana
- Died: March 2, 1929 (aged 70); Topeka, Kansas
- Occupations: Lawyer, Suffragist, Pioneer
- Notable work: Lilla Day Monroe Collection of Pioneer Stories
- Spouse: Lee Monroe

Lilla Day Monroe (November 11, 1858 – March 2, 1929) was a lawyer, pioneer, and suffragette who spent the majority of her life in Topeka, Kansas. She contributed significantly to the women's suffrage movement in Kansas. She also compiled the stories of over 800 women pioneers, which her great-granddaughter published as a book in 1982. In 1982, she was inducted to the National Cowgirl Museum and Hall of Fame.

== Life ==
Lilla Day Monroe was born Lilla Day Moore on November 11, 1859, in Mooresburg, Indiana. Mooresburg became Mooresville and is in Morgan County, Indiana and was named for her father. Her mother raised her in traditional homemaker skills. She taught her the importance of reading. Mother, daughter, and brothers walked regularly to a distant library to borrow books. The books were read and discussed after studies. Monroe's first occupation was that of a schoolteacher.

== The law ==
Monroe started reading for the law early, initially for Judge Slack of Indiana. She migrated to Wakeeney, Kansas, in 1884, just at the end of the frontier era. There she met and married Lee Monroe, who was an attorney originally from Pennsylvania. They raised four children. Monroe was interested in the law, so she clerked in her husband's practice. She also studied law with her husband at home. She passed the local bar examination in 1894. Then she practiced law in the District Court. On May 7, 1895, she became the first woman admitted to practice in the Kansas Supreme Court.

When her husband became judge of the Twenty-Third Judicial District, every court where Moore might practice was covered by her husband. Moore suspended all private practice of the law. She must have perceived a possible conflict or the appearance of one. Moore continued to use her training in volunteer pursuits for women's suffrage and other laws.

== Women's suffrage ==
In one of her earliest speeches regarding women's suffrage, titled, "Intemperance and Women's Rights", she argued for women to have the right to vote using liquor regulation laws as an example.

The Monroe family moved to Topeka in 1901. There Monroe became active in many causes, but most notably women's suffrage. She joined the Kansas State Suffrage Association and served as its president for many years. Monroe was also the head of the Kansas branch of the National Woman's Party. From 1908 to 1912, Monroe spent significant time urging legislators to support Women's suffrage. She also made numerous public lectures espousing the need for expanded women's rights. The Monroe home was located where the Docking State Office Building now resides in Topeka. Monroe's home hosted many women and organizations who were participants in Women's suffrage. Monroe's children pointed out that it was commonplace for some of the women to become house guests for many weeks.

Monroe composed and wrote a book during the years she worked towards accomplishing Women's suffrage. The book The Gee-Gee's Mother Goose is verse and nursery rhymes. She once explained that the book's goal was to alleviate tension "when the argument grew too heated".

No matter how dedicated she was to women's suffrage, Monroe was adamantly against being used for other purposes. When it seemed that the movement had been turned over to the Democrats, she resigned from her position as Kansas chair. She resigned from the organization as well. She claimed that the organization was putting the agenda of the Democratic party first and Women's suffrage second.

Monroe wrote and spoke quite frequently. Published accounts demonstrate Monroe's works were popular for their content as well as their delivery. It is also demonstrated in her 1906 address, "Some Women Suffrage History", to a mixed audience at Pike's Pawnee Village in honor of their centennial celebrations. The Pawnee Village was an event established from the Good Government Club which involved Monroe and her friends one year prior.

In 1919, Monroe was elected the first president of the Kansas Women Lawyers Association. The Association appropriated the same legislative programs as the Good Government Club. With Monroe heading the association, the association encouraged women to become lawyers, which would enable them to better further the interests of women and children. This plea for more women lawyers was cited in the women Lawyers' Journal. Monroe was also a member of the Kansas Equal Suffrage Association. This organization actively advocated for legislators to pass laws regarding women's rights. Monroe was the president of the organization for many years.

== Other ventures ==
=== Kansas Day Club ===
An event known as the Kansas Day Club had existed for a long time of which purpose had been to celebrate Kansas statehood. In 1905, Monroe and her friends felt that a women's version of the event would be more gratifying than being passive observers of the men's club. Monroe was an officer in the new Women's Kansas Day Club. She also composed the club's articles. The purpose of the club was to gather and preserve Kansas history and encourage patriotism among the youth of the state. The club was an offshoot of the Good Government Club.

=== Good Government Club ===
Monroe spent many years as a lobbyist with the Good Government Club of Topeka. This led to a unanimous Kansas Senate vote to allow her free access to the Senate floor. Monroe appears to have the most material in the Hand Book of Laws. Laws discussed in this handbook are mostly from reprints from her articles published in The Women Lawyers' Journal. Monroe spent 27 years as the head of this club's lobbying efforts.

Other lobbying attempts included a minimum wage bill, child hygiene division in the State Board of Health, the property and inheritance laws, prenuptial contracts, divorce reform, "care and confinement degenerates, and the segregation of mental and moral delinquents", equal tax exemption to both sexes. Monroe experienced a great deal of success in lobbying for women's suffrage and other examples mentioned herein.

=== Other clubs ===
Monroe created and edited The Club Woman. She created and edited The Kansas Woman's Journal. She was a member of the Women's Press Association, the State Federation of Clubs, the Business and Professional Women's Club, and the National League of Pen Women.

== Pioneer women stories ==
While Monroe was publishing her magazine, The Kansas Women's Journal, she started a journalism project to record the stories of pioneer women, which her daughter and great-granddaughter continued after she died. Monroe preserved more than 800 stories related by or about pioneer women. The stories reflect the adversity the women faced in settling the American frontier and their strength in overcoming these obstacles. The project is still in existence today, maintained as the Lilla Day Monroe Collection of Pioneer Women's Stories.

== Death and legacy ==
Monroe died on March 2, 1929, in Topeka.

Monroe's daughter Lenore Monroe Stratton carried the project on by typing and indexing the stories. Monroe's great-granddaughter Joanna Stratton, who was a Harvard University professor, published Monroe's pioneer women stories as a complete volume in Simon and Schuster's Pioneer Women, Voices From the Kansas Frontier in 1982.

A painting by Phyllis Garibay-Coon depicting Monroe and other Kansas suffragists was unveiled at the Kansas Statehouse in January 2025. It is titled "Rebel Women" and is the first art installation by any woman artist to be in the Kansas Statehouse.

Washburn University established the Lilla Day Monroe Award to honor women.
