= Kansas State Capitol =

State capitol building of the U.S. state of Kansas

- U.S. National Register of Historic Places
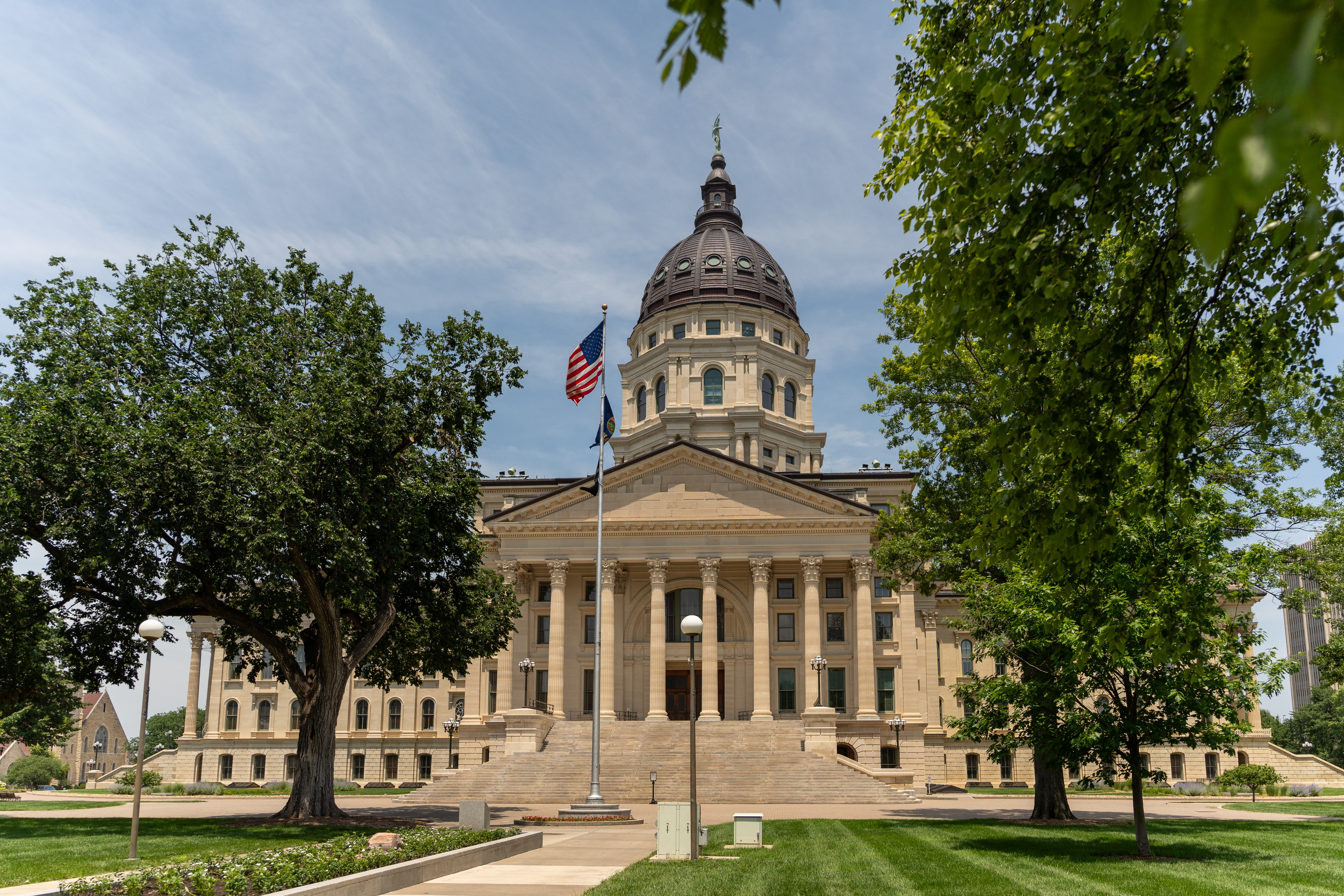
- The Statehouse, in 2024

- Location within Kansas Location within the United States
- Location: SW 8th & SW Van Buren, Topeka, Kansas
- Coordinates: 39°2′53″N 95°40′41″W
- Area: 20 acres (8.1 ha)
- Built: 1866–1903
- Architect: E. Townsend Mix
- Architectural style: French Renaissance
- NRHP reference No.: 71000330
- Added to NRHP: September 3, 1971

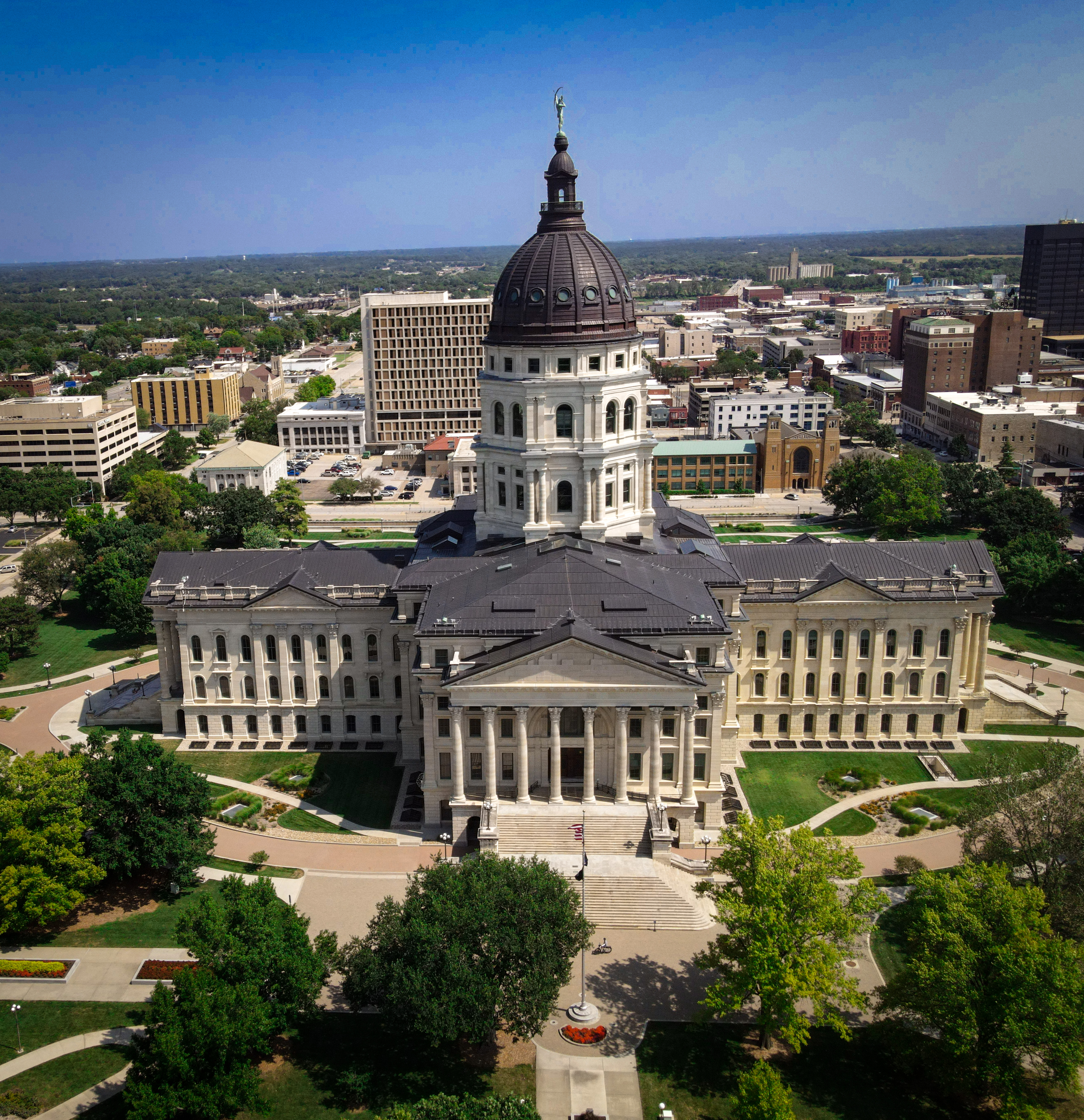
Aerial view of the Capitol building.

The Kansas State Capitol, known also as the Kansas Statehouse, is the building housing the executive and legislative branches of government for the U.S. state of Kansas. Located in the city of Topeka, which has served as the capital of Kansas since the Kansas Territory became a U. S. state in 1861, the building is the second to serve as the Kansas Capitol. During the territorial period (1854–1861), an earlier capitol building was begun but not completed in Lecompton, Kansas, and smaller structures in Lecompton and Topeka were where the territorial legislatures met (see Capitols of Kansas).

The dome, at 304 ft (93 m), is taller than the 288 ft (88 m) United States Capitol dome, although its diameter (50 ft (15 m)) is approximately half that of the national capitol (96 ft (29 m)). It is one of the few capitols in the United States that continues to offer tours that go to the top of the dome. Visitors enter the dome by climbing 296 steps leading from the fifth floor to the top.

== History ==
=== 19th century ===
The land for Capitol Square was donated by Cyrus K. Holliday via his Topeka Town Company in 1862. The master architect was Edward Townsend Mix with the wings designed by John G. Haskell. Construction on the East Wing began in 1866, using "native" limestone from Geary County, Kansas. Construction began on the West Wing in 1879 using limestone from Cottonwood Falls, Kansas and in 1881, the legislature authorized and appropriated funds for the construction of a central building to link the two wings. Construction of this central building began in 1886, and the contract for dome construction was let in May, 1889.

=== 20th century ===
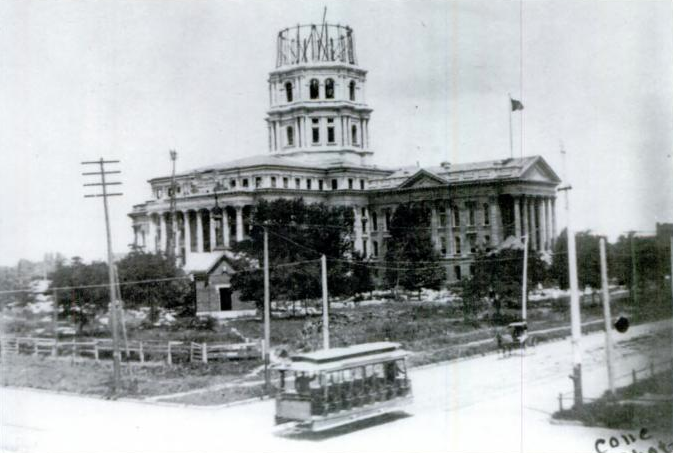
Under construction

The building was declared officially complete in 1903, after 37 years of construction.

It was not until 1988 that a design for a sculpture to stand atop the dome was finally approved. Ad Astra, a 22 2/12-foot (6.756 m) bronze sculpture weighing 4,420 pounds (2,000 kg), was installed atop the dome on October 10, 2002. The sculpture, by Richard Bergen, depicts a Kansa Native American with bow and arrow pointed at the North Star and was chosen from 27 entries to adorn the dome. The title Ad Astra is Latin shortening of the state motto Ad Astra Per Aspera To the stars through difficulty.

=== 21st century ===
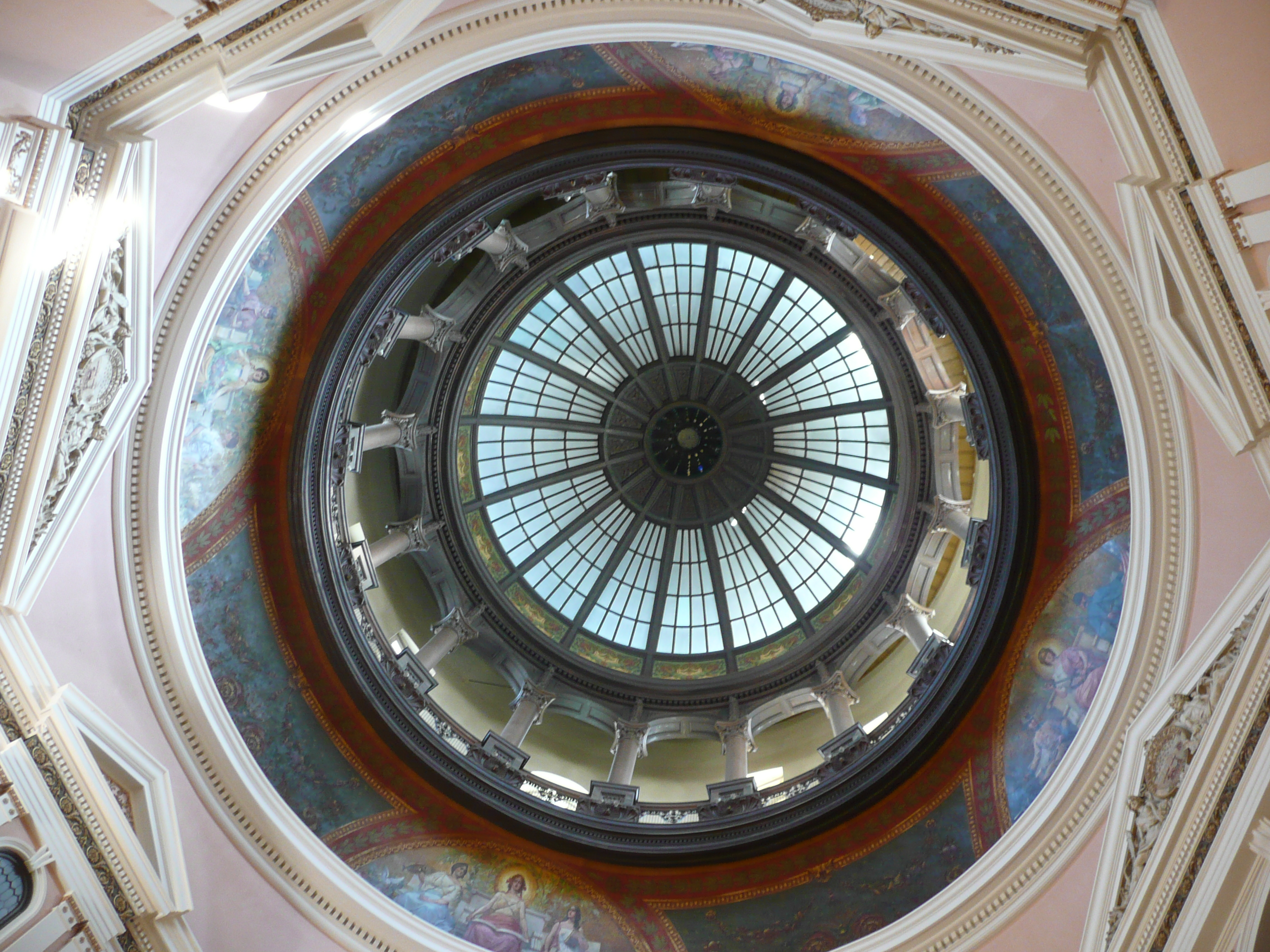
Looking up at the dome's interior in 2008

The building was featured prominently on Kansas license plates issued from January 2001 until April 2007. The Capitol dome and Native American Ad Astra statue are also featured on the standard license plate design that began issuance on August 19, 2024.

In December 2001, the Statehouse began a $120 million (~$202 million in 2024) modernization project, led by Treanor Architects; the project included restoration of its first through fifth floors, the rehabilitation and expansion of its basement, restoration of its exterior masonry and copper roof/dome. By the time the project finished in spring 2014, scope creep and delays resulted in a total cost of $332 million (~$432 million in 2024), covering "new heating and cooling systems, greater security and restroom accessibility, a new parking garage, visitor center, underground office space and replacing the roof and dome".

==== Frescos and murals ====
In 1898, Jerome Fedeli painted frescos near the top of the dome in the rotunda. Fedeli's work depicted bare-breasted classical women. However officials referred to the paintings as "Nude Telephone Girls" and had them painted-over.

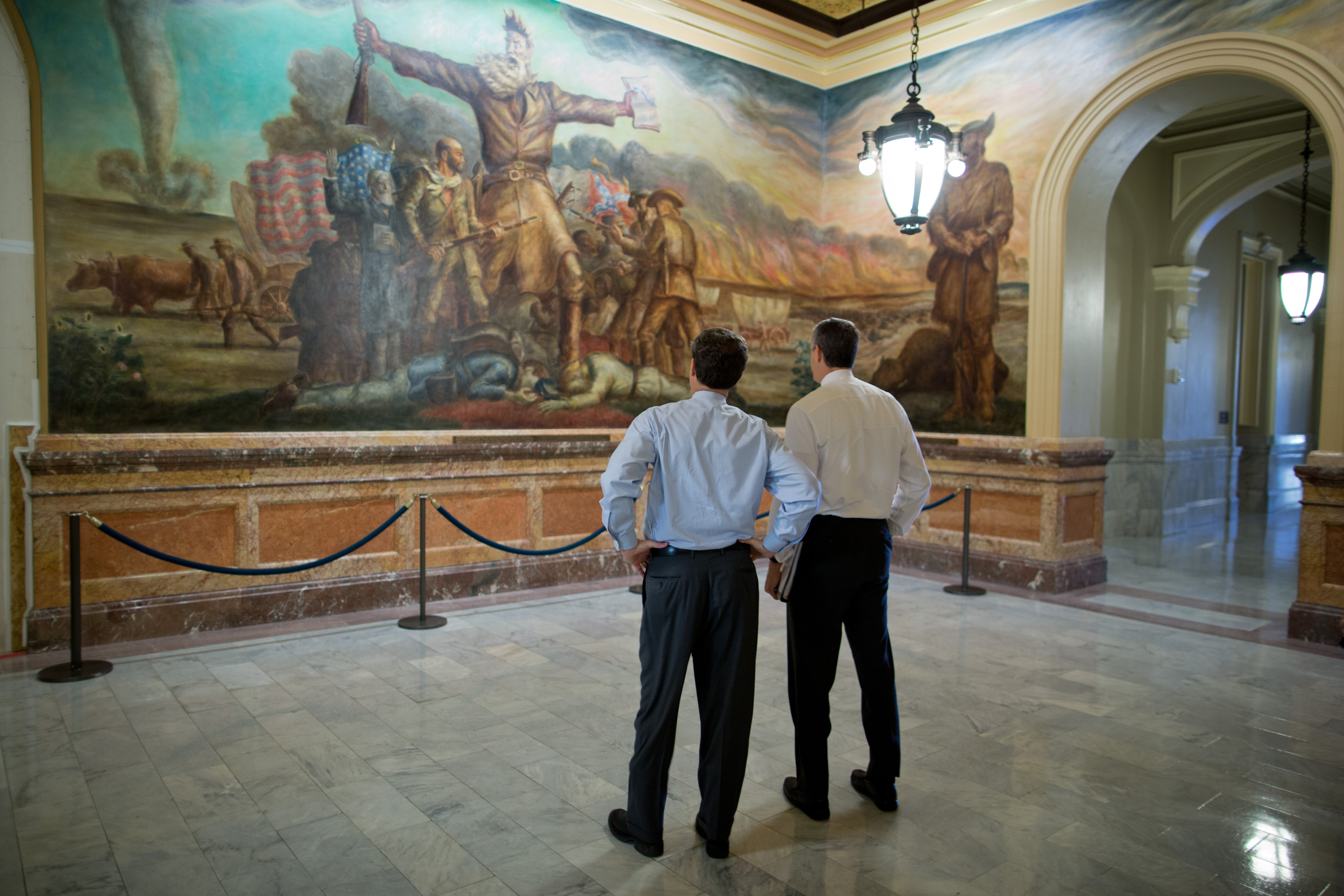
Kansas Governor Sam Brownback (left) and U.S. Secretary of Education Arne Duncan observe John Steuart Curry's Tragic Prelude in the second floor rotunda

In the 1930s, John Steuart Curry painted murals on the second floor including the building's most famous painting—Tragic Prelude—which depicts an oversize and raging John Brown wedged between the warring sides of the American Civil War, flanked by flames and a tornado. Curry's work gained considerable notoriety for depicting unsavory aspects of Kansas history and he left them unsigned and did not complete a commission to paint murals in the rotunda. Curry's depiction of Brown is believed to be the only instance of a person convicted of treason being featured in a state capitol.

David Hicks Overmyer painted a series of murals in the first floor rotunda between 1951 and 1953 entitled The Coming of the Spaniards, The Battle of Arickaree, The Battle of Mine Creek, Building a Sod House, Lewis and Clark in Kansas, Westward Ho, Arrival of the Railroad, and Chisholm Trail.

From 1976 to 1978, Lumen Martin Winter painted the murals in the rotunda.

A mural by Phyllis Garibay-Coon depicting Kansas suffragists (Minnie J. Grinstead, Lucy Browne Johnston, Carrie Langston Hughes, Mamie Dillard, Anna C. Wait, Clarina I. H. Nichols, Annie Le Porte Diggs, Lutie Lytle, Laura M. Johns, Lilla Day Monroe, Anna O. Anthony, Jane L. Brooks, and Lizzie S. Sheldon) was unveiled in the Kansas Statehouse in January 2025. It is located on the east side of the first-floor rotunda, is titled "Rebel Women", and is the first art installation by any woman artist to be in the Kansas Statehouse.

== See also ==
- List of Kansas state legislatures
- Kansas Museum of History
- List of state and territorial capitols in the United States
- List of tallest domes
