= Coker, Alabama =

Town of Coker
- Town
- Location of Coker in Tuscaloosa County, Alabama.
- Coordinates: 33°14′52″N 87°40′44″W
- Country: United States
- State: Alabama
- County: Tuscaloosa

Area
  - Total: 1.96 sq mi (5.07 km^{2})
  - Land: 1.95 sq mi (5.05 km^{2})
  - Water: 0.0077 sq mi (0.02 km^{2})
- Elevation: 151 ft (46 m)

Population (2020)
  - Total: 904
  - Density: 463.6/sq mi (178.99/km^{2})
- Time zone: UTC-6 (Central (CST))
  - Summer (DST): UTC-5 (CDT)
- ZIP code: 35452
- Area codes: 205, 659
- FIPS code: 01-16312
- GNIS feature ID: 2406291
- Website: townofcoker.com

Coker is a town in Tuscaloosa County, Alabama, United States. It incorporated in 1999. At the 2020 census, the population was 904. It is part of the Tuscaloosa, Alabama Metropolitan Statistical Area.

== Geography ==
According to the U.S. Census Bureau, the town has a total area of 2.3 square miles (6.0 km^{2}), all land.

=== Climate ===
The climate in this area is characterized by hot, humid summers and generally mild to cool winters. According to the Köppen Climate Classification system, Coker has a humid subtropical climate, abbreviated "Cfa" on climate maps.

== Demographics ==
Historical population
Census	Pop.	Note	%±
2000	808		—
2010	979		21.2%
2020	904		−7.7%
U.S. Decennial Census; 2013 Estimate

As of the census of 2010, there were 979 people, 365 households, and 280 families residing in the town. There were 428 housing units. The racial makeup of the town was 95.20% White, 2.00% Black or African American, 0.20% Native American, 0.90% Asian, 0.15% from other races, and 0.10% from two or more races. 1.80% of the population were Hispanic or Latino of any race.

There were 304 households, out of which 37.5% had children under the age of 18 living with them, 63.2% were married couples living together, 8.6% had a female householder with no husband present, and 23.0% were non-families. 19.4% of all households were made up of individuals, and 11.5% had someone living alone who was 65 years of age or older. The average household size was 2.66 and the average family size was 3.02.

In the town, the population was spread out, with 26.7% under the age of 18, 6.3% from 18 to 24, 31.3% from 25 to 44, 22.5% from 45 to 64, and 13.1% who were 65 years of age or older. The median age was 36 years. For every 100 females, there were 100.5 males. For every 100 females age 18 and over, there were 98.0 males.

The median income for a household in the town was $41,184, and the median income for a family was $50,875. Males had a median income of $40,250 versus $26,429 for females. The per capita income for the town was $18,543. About 6.6% of families and 5.0% of the population were below the poverty line, including 6.7% of those under age 18 and 9.3% of those age 65 or over.

== Government ==
The town of Coker is governed by a mayor and a five-person town council.

Fire protection is provided by a volunteer fire department. Law enforcement services are provided by the Tuscaloosa County Sheriff's Department.
