= Tornado outbreak of April 4–5, 1966 =

Weather event in the United States

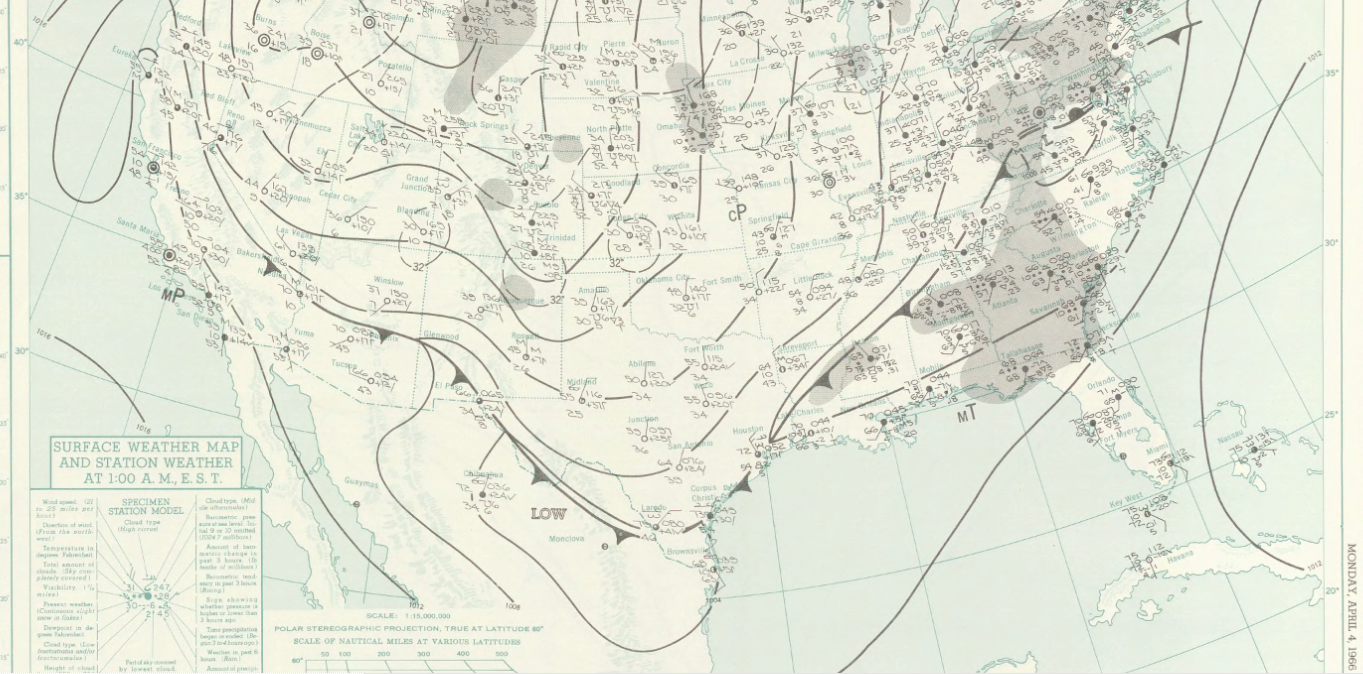
- Surface weather analysis on the morning of April 4, 1966

Meteorological history
- Date: April 4–5, 1966

Tornado outbreak
- Tornadoes: 3 confirmed
- Max. rating: F4 tornado
- Duration: 1 day and 6 1/2 hours

Overall effects
- Casualties: 11 fatalities, 530 injuries
- Damage: $75.252 million (1966 USD) (Note: All losses are in 1966 USD unless otherwise noted.) $747 million (2025 USD)
- Areas affected: Central Florida and North Carolina
- Part of the tornado outbreaks of 1966

On April 4–5, 1966, an outbreak of at least three tornadoes affected portions of Florida and North Carolina. It included a deadly pair of tornado families that struck the I-4 corridor in Central Florida from the Tampa Bay Area to Brevard County. At least two long-tracked tornadoes affected the region, each of which featured a path length in excess of 100 mi (160 km). The two tornadoes are officially listed as continuous events, but the tornadoes' damage paths did not cross the entire state, and downbursts may have been responsible for destruction near Lake Juliana and in the Kissimmee–Saint Cloud area. However, tornado and downburst damage combined was continuous from coast to coast.

One of the tornadoes produced estimated F4 damage on the Fujita scale; it remains one of only two F4 tornadoes to strike the U.S. state of Florida, the other of which occurred on April 15, 1958. Both F4 tornadoes coincided with El Niño—a condition known to locally enhance severe weather over Florida. On April 4, 1966, a total of 11 people were killed across the state of Florida, including three in the city of Tampa and seven in Polk County. The F4 tornado remains the fourth-deadliest tornado event recorded in Florida; only tornadoes on March 31, 1962, February 2, 2007, and February 23, 1998, caused more deaths in the state. All of the events were induced by non-tropical cyclones. (Note: An outbreak is generally defined as a group of at least six tornadoes with no more than a six-hour gap between individual tornadoes; however, the threshold varies slightly according to local climatology. On the Florida peninsula, an outbreak consists of at least four tornadoes occurring relatively synchronously—no more than four hours apart.) (Note: The Fujita scale was devised under the aegis of scientist T. Theodore Fujita in the early 1970s. Prior to the advent of the scale in 1971, tornadoes in the United States were officially unrated. While the Fujita scale has been superseded by the Enhanced Fujita scale in the U.S. since February 1, 2007, Canada used the old scale until April 1, 2013; nations elsewhere, like the United Kingdom, apply other classifications such as the TORRO scale.) (Note: Historically, the number of tornadoes globally and in the United States was and is likely underrepresented: research by Grazulis on annual tornado activity suggests that, as of 2001, only 53% of yearly U.S. tornadoes were officially recorded. Documentation of tornadoes outside the United States was historically less exhaustive, owing to the lack of monitors in many nations and, in some cases, to internal political controls on public information. Most countries only recorded tornadoes that produced severe damage or loss of life. Significant low biases in U.S. tornado counts likely occurred through the early 1990s, when advanced NEXRAD was first installed and the National Weather Service began comprehensively verifying tornado occurrences.)

== Background ==
A squall line affected the central Florida peninsula on April 4, and both tornadoes originated as waterspouts over the Gulf of Mexico. The two tornadoes, moving generally east-northeastward at estimated speeds of up to 60 mph (97 km/h), were spawned from a single thunderstorm that entered the Tampa Bay region, and they are believed to have represented a tornado family. Initially, the tornadoes were poorly forecasted by the U.S. Weather Bureau, since meteorological analysis did not indicate the presence of an adjacent surface low, which would have enhanced conditions for tornadoes. The first tornado watch was not released prior to the tornadoes.

== Confirmed tornadoes ==
Confirmed tornadoes by Fujita rating
FU	F0	F1	F2	F3	F4	F5	Total
0	0	1	1	0	1	0	≥ 3

=== April 4 event ===
Confirmed tornadoes – Monday, April 4, 1966 (Note: All dates are based on the local time zone where the tornado touched down; however, all times are in Coordinated Universal Time and dates are split at midnight CST/CDT for consistency.) (Note: Prior to 1994, only the average widths of tornado paths were officially listed.)
F#	Location	County / Parish	State	Start coord.	Time (UTC)	Path length	Max. width	Summary
F4	Largo to N of Merritt Island	Pinellas, Hillsborough, Polk, Osceola, Brevard	FL	27.92°N 82.80°W	13:00–?	135.8 miles (218.5 km)	300 yards (270 m)	11 deaths – See section on this tornado
F2	S of St. Petersburg to Cocoa Beach	Pinellas, Hillsborough, Polk, Osceola, Brevard	FL	27.70°N 82.63°W	13:15–?	123.3 miles (198.4 km)	150 yards (140 m)	See section on this tornado

=== April 5 event ===
Confirmed tornadoes – Tuesday, April 5, 1966
F#	Location	County / Parish	State	Start coord.	Time (UTC)	Path length	Max. width	Summary
F1	WNW of Faith	Rowan	NC	35.60°N 80.50°W	19:30–?	0.1 miles (0.16 km)	33 yards (30 m)	Brief tornado destroyed a 15-by-36-foot (4.6 by 11.0 m) structure. Losses totaled $2,500.

=== Largo–Clearwater–Carrollwood–Temple Terrace–Galloway–Gibsonia–Loughman, Florida ===
Largo–Clearwater–Carrollwood–Temple Terrace–Galloway–Gibsonia–Loughman, Florida
Meteorological history
- Date: April 4, 1966

F4 tornado
- on the Fujita scale
- Highest winds: 210 mph (340 km/h)

Overall effects
- Casualties: 11 fatalities, 530 injuries
- Damage: $75 million (1966 USD) $744 million (2025 USD)

The first and most damaging of at least two long-tracked tornado families touched down around 8:00 a.m. EST near Largo, Florida, in Pinellas County. It damaged 36–40 houses in the Clearwater area. Later, it continued across the northern side of Tampa, where it demolished 150–158 homes and caused significant damages to 186 residences, primarily in and near Carrollwood and Temple Terrace. Three fatalities occurred in this area, all on a single block. The tornado also caused damage to a junior high school (now called Greco Middle School), and ripped roofs off homes and one dormitory on the University of South Florida's main campus. Losses in the Tampa Bay Area reached $4 million.

The tornado moved east-northeast into Polk County and progressed through Galloway and Gibsonia, devastating those rural communities, both of which received the most severe damages in Polk County; at least 93 and possibly more than 100 homes were demolished in the area, one or two of which sustained F4 damage, and seven deaths occurred. Reports indicated the possibility of a pair of tornadoes in the Galloway–Gibsonia area, each on a parallel track. This and the next tornado collectively destroyed 480 homes, killed eight people, injured 280 others, and caused $20 million in damages in Polk County alone.

After striking Galloway and Gibsonia, the tornado also destroyed many trailers and a restaurant in the Loughman area, north of Haines City and Davenport. One woman died in a mobile home, 4 mi (6.4 km) outside Davenport. The tornado eventually moved over the Cocoa area and lifted between Courtenay and Merritt Island. Total damages reached $75 million, 11 people were killed, and 530 people received injuries. The total path length may have been less—100 mi (160 km)—than is officially listed.

=== St. Petersburg–Lakeland–Winter Haven–Haines City–Auburndale–Holopaw–Rockledge–Cocoa–Cocoa Beach, Florida ===
St. Petersburg–Lakeland–Winter Haven–Haines City–Auburndale–Holopaw–Rockledge–Cocoa–Cocoa Beach, Florida
Meteorological history
- Date: April 4, 1966

F2 tornado
- on the Fujita scale
- Highest winds: 135 mph (217 km/h)

Overall effects
- Damage: $250,000 (1966 USD) $2.48 million (2025 USD)

The second of a pair of tornado families touched down 15 minutes later than its predecessor near the Sunshine Skyway Bridge, where it lifted a 23-foot-long (7.0 m) trailer and an automobile. In the Pinellas Point area, on the southernmost edge of St. Petersburg, the tornado damaged or destroyed 43 homes and injured nine people. It then crossed Tampa Bay, moved inland over Central Florida, and closely paralleled the path of the more powerful first tornado. A total of 15 homes were destroyed in Lakeland, while homes and businesses were demolished in northern Winter Haven. 18 students at a school in Lakeland sustained injuries. The tornado also destroyed warehouses, Citrus trees, and trailers from Auburndale and northern Winter Haven to just south of Haines City.

The tornado later crossed into Osceola County, passing near Holopaw, and continued into Brevard County. In the Cocoa Beach–Rockledge area, 150 trailers in six different trailer parks were destroyed, resulting in more than 100 injuries. A shopping center and 20–23 frame homes were likewise demolished. Additionally, the tornado struck the training site for the Houston Astros in nearby Cocoa, ripping four light standards from the ground, flattening the center field fence, and destroying all the backstops and batting cages. One of the cages was thrown more than 800 ft (240 m) into nearby woods.

Tornado researcher Thomas P. Grazulis classified the tornado as an F3 and split the event into two separate tornadoes, at least one of which was likely a tornado family. One of the tornadoes tracked for 80 mi (130 km) and the other for 40 mi (64 km).

== Aftermath and recovery ==
Widespread looting was reported in some localized areas after the passage of the tornadoes in Hillsborough and Polk counties; a total of 200 National Guardsmen were deployed to the two counties, while lesser numbers were ordered to the city of Cocoa. Damage in the Lakeland area was compared to the aftermath of the Normandy invasion during World War II. This event may have contained multiple tornadoes, which would constitute another tornado family.

== See also ==
- List of North American tornadoes and tornado outbreaks
- 1998 Kissimmee tornado outbreak

== Sources ==
- Brooks, Harold E. (April 2004). "On the Relationship of Tornado Path Length and Width to Intensity". Weather and Forecasting. 19 (2). Boston: American Meteorological Society: 310–19. Bibcode:2004WtFor..19..310B. doi:10.1175/1520-0434(2004)019<0310:OTROTP>2.0.CO;2.
- Cook, A. R.; Schaefer, J. T. (August 2008). "The Relation of El Niño–Southern Oscillation (ENSO) to Winter Tornado Outbreaks". Monthly Weather Review. 136 (8). Boston: American Meteorological Society: 3135. Bibcode:2008MWRv..136.3121C. doi:10.1175/2007MWR2171.1.
- Grazulis, Thomas P. (July 1993). Significant Tornadoes 1680–1991: A Chronology and Analysis of Events. St. Johnsbury, Vermont: The Tornado Project of Environmental Films. ISBN 1-879362-03-1.
- Grazulis, Thomas P. (2001a). The Tornado: Nature's Ultimate Windstorm. Norman: University of Oklahoma Press. ISBN 978-0-8061-3538-0.
- Grazulis, Thomas P. (2001b). F5-F6 Tornadoes. St. Johnsbury, Vermont: The Tornado Project of Environmental Films.
- Hagemeyer, Bartlett C. (September 1997). "Peninsular Florida Tornado Outbreaks". Weather and Forecasting. 12 (3). Boston: American Meteorological Society: 400. Bibcode:1997WtFor..12..399H. doi:10.1175/1520-0434(1997)012<0399:PFTO>2.0.CO;2. S2CID 120588681.
- National Weather Service (April 1966). Storm Data Publication (Report). National Centers for Environmental Information – via Storm Events Database.
- U.S. Weather Bureau (April 1966). "Storm Data and Unusual Weather Phenomena". Storm Data. 8 (4). Asheville, North Carolina: National Climatic Data Center.
