= 1998 Central Florida tornado outbreak =

Tornado outbreak in Central Florida, US, on February 22–23, 1998

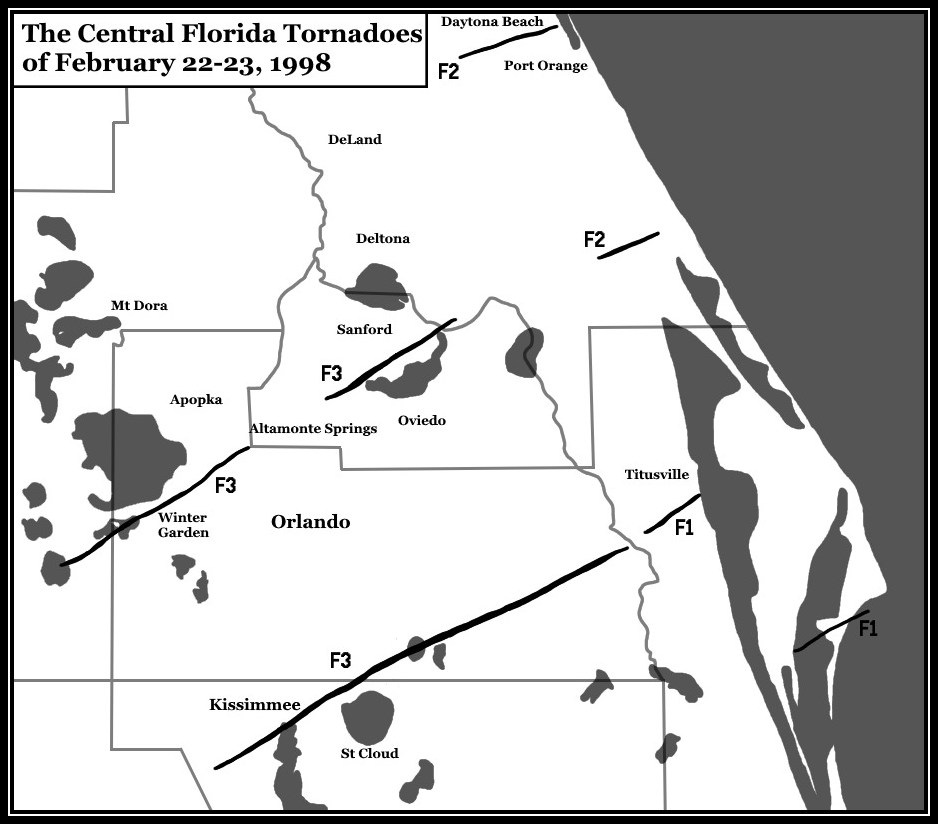
- The tornado tracks of the 1998 Central Florida tornado outbreak

Meteorological history
- Duration: February 21–23, 1998

Tornado outbreak
- Tornadoes: 15
- Max. rating: F3 tornado
- Duration: 1 day, 8 hours, 25 minutes

Overall effects
- Fatalities: 42
- Injuries: >259
- Damage: $107.304 million (1998 USD) $205.65 million (2025 USD)
- Areas affected: Central Florida (Primarily the Greater Orlando area)
- Part of the tornado outbreaks of 1998

On February 21–23, 1998, a devastating tornado outbreak affected portions of the Southeastern United States, primarily the U.S. state of Florida. It was the deadliest tornado event in Florida history. In all, 15 tornadoes touched down, one of which was particularly long lived and tracked for nearly 40 miles (64 km). Affecting mainly the Interstate 4 (I-4) corridor of Central Florida, including the Greater Orlando area, the tornadoes—among the strongest ever recorded in Florida—produced near-violent damage, killed 42 people, and caused 259 injuries. This outbreak is sometimes referred to as "The Night of the Tornadoes".

One of the tornadoes was initially rated an F4 on the Fujita scale—among only two others officially so designated in the State of Florida, in 1958 and 1966—but was subsequently downgraded to a high-end F3; with 25 fatalities, most of which occurred in and near Kissimmee, this tornado featured the deadliest single-tornado death toll in Florida history, the previous such record being 17 on March 31, 1962. Two other F3s and a couple of additional strong tornadoes occurred over portions of Central Florida during the outbreak, killing an additional 17 people and injuring 109 others.

As the most intense activity of the outbreak occurred after sunset, concentrated either shortly prior to or after midnight, and affected densely populated portions of the I-4 corridor, including numerous mobile home and recreational vehicle (RV) parks, many sleeping residents became casualties; of the 42 deaths, 40 occurred in manufactured housing or trailers, including 15 at the Morningside Acres mobile home park and eight at the Ponderosa RV Park, both of which were located in Kissimmee. (Note: An outbreak is generally defined as a group of at least six tornadoes with no more than a six-hour gap between individual tornadoes; however, the threshold varies slightly according to local climatology. On the Florida peninsula, an outbreak consists of at least four tornadoes occurring relatively synchronously—no more than four hours apart.) (Note: The Fujita scale was devised under the aegis of scientist T. Theodore Fujita in the early 1970s. Prior to the advent of the scale in 1971, tornadoes in the United States were officially unrated. While the Fujita scale has been superseded by the Enhanced Fujita scale in the U.S. since February 1, 2007, Canada used the old scale until April 1, 2013; nations elsewhere, like the United Kingdom, apply other classifications such as the TORRO scale.) (Note: Historically, the number of tornadoes globally and in the United States was and is likely underrepresented: research by Grazulis on annual tornado activity suggests that, as of 2001, only 53% of yearly U.S. tornadoes were officially recorded. Documentation of tornadoes outside the United States was historically less exhaustive, owing to the lack of monitors in many nations and, in some cases, to internal political controls on public information. Most countries only recorded tornadoes that produced severe damage or loss of life. Significant low biases in U.S. tornado counts likely occurred through the early 1990s, when advanced NEXRAD was first installed and the National Weather Service began comprehensively verifying tornado occurrences.)

== Background ==
On February 22, 1998, data from both NEXRAD and weather satellites indicated that a bow echo and associated outflow boundary bisected portions of the Florida Panhandle and northernmost peninsular Florida, including the First Coast. Along the boundary, a vigorous squall line with embedded supercells—the initial nexus of severe weather—developed over the eastern Gulf of Mexico and headed eastward, toward the Tampa Bay Area. Ahead of the squall line, a retreating warm front coincided with robust atmospheric instability due to diurnal heating. By 7:00 p.m. EST, a low-pressure area near Mobile, Alabama, was linked to a cold front that extended southward, just off the west coast of Florida, while a trough in the middle to upper troposphere generated a strong subtropical jet maximum of up to 140 kn (160 mph; 260 km/h). This upper-level jet streak intersected a strengthening low-level wind field, with winds locally in excess of 50 kn (58 mph; 93 km/h) just above the surface, and thereby yielded conducive conditions to tornadogenesis.

During the evening and the overnight hours of February 22–23, 1998, this volatile environment—known to be common in the El Niño phase of the El Niño–Southern Oscillation (ENSO) during the Florida dry season (November 1 – April 30)—eventually produced seven tornadoes between about 11:00 p.m. EST on February 22 and 2:30 am. EST on the following morning. During El Niño the jet stream is typically stronger and displaced southward near or over Florida during meteorological winter and spring, thereby augmenting the likelihood of significant severe weather and tornado activity. During February 1998 one of the strongest El Niño episodes on record was ongoing, rivaling a similar episode in 1982–83 that had also contributed to elevated tornado activity over Florida. By October 1997, the National Weather Service (NWS) in Melbourne, Florida, highlighted the potential for enhanced severe weather over the coming months due to El Niño.

By 6:00 am. EST (11:00 UTC) on February 22, the Storm Prediction Center (SPC) had issued a convective outlook for day one indicating a moderate risk of severe thunderstorms capable of producing tornadoes over portions of North and Central Florida. At 11:55 am. EST (16:55 UTC), the NWS in Melbourne also issued a Hazardous Weather Outlook (HWO) highlighting a "significant" threat of tornadoes, hail, and destructive winds. By 1:44 pm. EST (18:44 UTC), the SPC issued its first tornado watch covering portions of the threatened area in Central Florida. Numerous, long-lived supercells with persistent mesocyclones would eventually evolve during the evening and track generally east-northeastward or northeastward over Central Florida, generating tornadoes that killed 42 people and seriously injured at least 259 others, making the outbreak the deadliest in Florida's history, surpassing another that killed 17 people on March 31, 1962, in Santa Rosa County.

== Outbreak statistics ==
Impacts by region
| Region | Locale | Deaths | Injuries | Damages | Source |
|---|---|---|---|---|---|
| United States | Alabama | 0 | 0 | $75,000 | |
| United States | Florida | 42 | 259 | $107,224,000 | |
| United States | Georgia | 0 | 0 | $5,000 | |
| United States | Texas | 0 | 0 | Unknown | |
| Total | | 42 | 259 | $107,304,000 | |

== Confirmed tornadoes ==
Confirmed tornadoes by Fujita rating
| FU | F0 | F1 | F2 | F3 | F4 | F5 | Total |
|---|---|---|---|---|---|---|---|
| 0 | 7 | 3 | 2 | 3 | 0 | 0 | 15 |

=== February 21 event ===
Confirmed tornadoes – Saturday, February 21, 1998 (Note: All dates are based on the local time zone where the tornado touched down; however, all times are in Coordinated Universal Time and dates are split at midnight CST/CDT for consistency.) (Note: Prior to 1994, only the average widths of tornado paths were officially listed.)
| F# | Location | County / Parish | State | Start coord. | Time (UTC) | Path length | Max. width | Summary |
|---|---|---|---|---|---|---|---|---|
| F0 | N of Santa Cruz | Duval | TX | 27.42°N 98.27°W | 23:05–? | 0.1 miles (0.16 km) | 10 yards (9.1 m) | A brief tornado was reported south of Rios. |
| F0 | S of San Diego | Duval | TX | 27.70°N 98.25°W | 23:18–? | 0.1 miles (0.16 km) | 10 yards (9.1 m) | A brief tornado was reported. |
| F0 | Seven Sisters | Duval | TX | 28.02°N 98.55°W | 00:00–? | 0.1 miles (0.16 km) | 10 yards (9.1 m) | A brief tornado was reported. |

=== February 22 event ===
Confirmed tornadoes – Sunday, February 22, 1998
| F# | Location | County / Parish | State | Start coord. | Time (UTC) | Path length | Max. width | Summary |
|---|---|---|---|---|---|---|---|---|
| F0 | Taylor | Houston | AL | 31.17°N 85.47°W | 14:00–? | 0.3 miles (0.48 km) | 50 yards (46 m) | This short-lived, weak tornado, visible as a funnel cloud, affected 52 homes in a subdivision of Taylor, damaging or downing sheds, fencing, awnings, porches, shingles, power lines, and trees. Losses totaled $75,000. |
| F0 | Hollister | Putnam | FL | 29.62°N 81.82°W | 20:45–? | 0.2 miles (0.32 km) | 30 yards (27 m) | A brief, weak tornado felled several large trees. Losses totaled $4,000. |
| F0 | N of Toledo | Charlton | GA | 29.62°N 81.82°W | 22:05–? | 0.5 miles (0.80 km) | 30 yards (27 m) | Occurring south-southwest of Folkston, a weak tornado downed several large trees, snapped power lines, and damaged a mobile home. Losses totaled $5,000. Tornado ended near Chesser Island in the Okefenokee National Wildlife Refuge. |
| F1 | Indialantic | Brevard | FL | 28.08°N 80.57°W | 22:20–? | 1 mile (1.6 km) | 50 yards (46 m) | This tornado originated as a waterspout over the Indian River and headed northeast at 30 mph (48 km/h), proceeding ashore a short distance north of U.S. Highway 192 in Indialantic. One home was unroofed and 10 others received damage. Pool screens, awnings, carports, and several trees were damaged or downed as well. Losses totaled $200,000. |
| F0 | Coleman | Sumter | FL | 28.80°N 82.07°W | 02:50–? | 0.1 miles (0.16 km) | 5 yards (4.6 m) | A brief, weak tornado developed near the intersection of U.S. Highway 301 and County Road 468, damaging or downing trees, a pair of power poles, two sheds, and a mobile home. Losses totaled $20,000. |
| F2 | SW of Daytona Beach to South Daytona | Volusia | FL | 29.17°N 81.10°W | 03:55–04:05 | 8 miles (13 km) | 150 yards (140 m) | 1 death – The first significant (F2 or stronger) tornado of the outbreak formed from the same supercell as the preceding tornado in Sumter County, touching down on Route 92 and killing a 41-year-old man in a mobile home before tracking over the intersection of I-95 and I-4, overturning four semi-trailer trucks. Afterward, the tornado passed just south of Daytona International Speedway and Daytona Beach International Airport, damaging or destroying 64 homes and 150 mobile homes in the Pelican Bay development and the Colonial Colony South trailer park, respectively, along with numerous cars. In all, the tornado destroyed or damaged 600 structures. Roof trusses were carried up to 1 mi (1.6 km). Three people were injured and losses totaled $4 million. |
| F3 | S of Orange Mountain to SE of Piedmont | Lake, Orange | FL | 28.48°N 81.72°W | 04:37–05:00 | 18 miles (29 km) | 200 yards (180 m) | 3 deaths – The first of three intense (F3 or stronger) tornadoes in the outbreak began south-southeast of Clermont, downing trees across rural portions of Lake County, before moving into the Winter Garden–Ocoee area, where 500 buildings were destroyed or damaged, including those at a mobile home park and an apartment complex. 70 people were injured and losses totaled $15 million. The tornado ended north-northwest of Lockhart. |
| F3 | Longwood to NNW of Palm Shadows | Seminole, Volusia | FL | 28.70°N 81.35°W | 05:10–05:28 | 16 miles (26 km) | 200 yards (180 m) | 13 deaths – This tornado formed from the same storm as the Winter Garden–Ocoee F3, heading northeast at 45 mph (72 km/h). It severely damaged neighborhoods and mobile home parks in southeastern Sanford, resulting in 12 fatalities there. Several buildings were destroyed at the Sanford Airport. A total of 625 structures were damaged or destroyed. The tornado killed a 53-year-old man 4 mi (6.4 km) south of Osteen before ending just west of Lemon Bluff. 36 people were injured and losses totaled $31 million. |
| F3 | SSW of Campbell to W of Port St. John | Osceola, Orange | FL | 28.23°N 81.48°W | 05:40–06:38 | 38 miles (61 km) | 250 yards (230 m) | 25 deaths – See section on this tornado – This, the deadliest tornado in Florida history, was initially rated F4. At least 150 people were injured and losses totaled $55 million. |
| F2 | S of Creighton to Ariel | Volusia | FL | 28.85°N 80.93°W | 05:45–05:52 | 5 miles (8.0 km) | 150 yards (140 m) | A strong tornado formed from the same storm as the Sanford F3, passing through the Oak Hill area. A few barns and several trees were downed, while a pair of houses and 10 mobile homes received damage. Losses totaled $500,000. |

=== February 23 event ===
Confirmed tornadoes – Monday, February 23, 1998
| F# | Location | County / Parish | State | Start coord. | Time (UTC) | Path length | Max. width | Summary |
|---|---|---|---|---|---|---|---|---|
| F1 | Southern Titusville | Brevard | FL | 28.55°N 80.77°W | 06:38–? | 1 mile (1.6 km) | 100 yards (91 m) | A brief tornado developed from the same storm as the long-tracked Kissimmee F3, passing northwest of the Titusville Airport. Four houses were damaged and trees were downed. Losses totaled $500,000. |
| F1 | Cape Canaveral | Brevard | FL | 28.42°N 80.53°W | 07:30–? | 1 mile (1.6 km) | 75 yards (69 m) | A brief tornado hit Port Canaveral from the west, damaging 30 structures. The tornado formed over the Banana River and dissipated over the Atlantic Ocean. Losses totaled $1 million. |

=== Kissimmee, Florida ===
Kissimmee, Florida
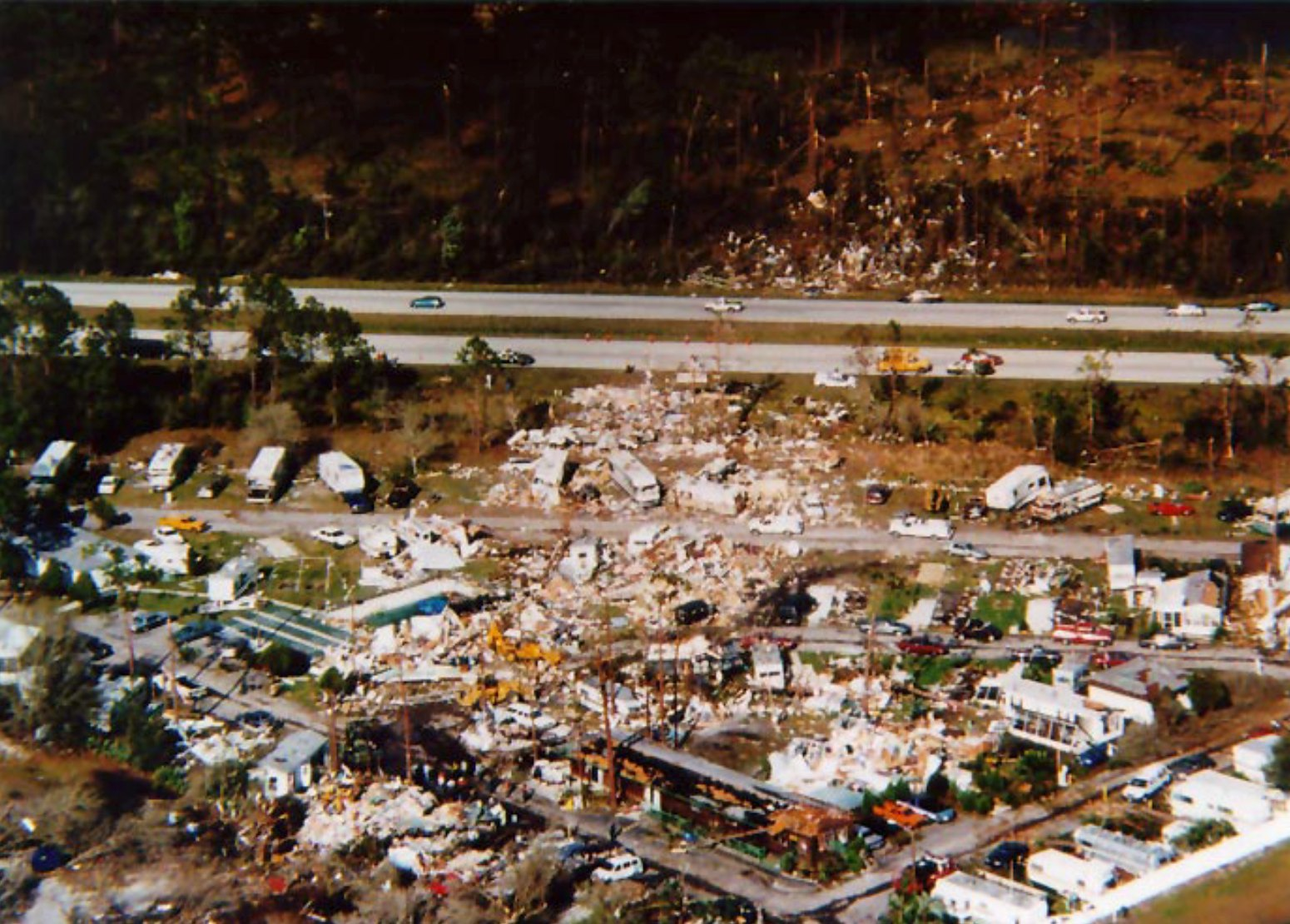
- The Ponderosa Pines RV park near Kissimmee, Florida after the tornado.

F3 tornado
- on the Fujita scale

Overall effects
- Fatalities: 25
- Injuries: ≥150
- Damage: $55 million (1998 USD)
- Areas affected: Central Florida

This devastating, long-tracked tornado was initially assigned an F4 rating, but NWS assessments later reduced this to high-end F3 intensity. The tornado began near Intercession City, only 8 mi (13 km) southeast of Walt Disney World, and moved northeastward. It first did some minor damage to homes in the Campbell–Poinciana area. As it moved into Kissimmee, it leveled part of The Shops at Kissimmee shopping center and crossed the northern part of Lake Tohopekaliga.

The tornado subsequently crossed U.S. Route 441 and reached its maximum intensity as it struck the Ponderosa Pines RV park. In the RV park, at least 10 people died and almost all of the 200 residences, including both RVs and mobile homes, were destroyed. Many of these residences had their frames thrown, stripped, and wrapped around trees. Many trees were snapped and uprooted as well. Nearby, the Morningside Acres mobile home park was devastated as well. Upon leaving the Ponderosa Pines and Morningside areas, the tornado heavily damaged homes next to a school in the Lakeside Estates subdivision of Buenaventura Lakes.

After devastating the Kissimmee area, the tornado mostly impacted rural, swampy areas in Orange and Brevard counties, though it hit a few lakeside homes in Lake Hart and Lake Mary Jane. It lifted over the Tosohatchee Wildlife Management Area, 8 mi (13 km) east-southeast of Christmas, west of Port St. John—just before the Great Outdoors RV Park, which, according to the NWS, was "one of the largest in the United States, housing 1,000 recreational vehicle lots." Along the entire path, 1,000 structures were damaged or destroyed, including several well-built homes that were nearly leveled. At least one new home, built of stucco and CBUs, was flattened except for its front entryway and part of a wall.

== See also ==
- List of North American tornadoes and tornado outbreaks
- 2007 Groundhog Day tornado outbreak
- Tornado outbreak of April 4–5, 1966

== Sources ==
- Brooks, Harold E. (April 2004). "On the Relationship of Tornado Path Length and Width to Intensity". Weather and Forecasting. 19 (2): 310–19. Bibcode:2004WtFor..19..310B. doi:10.1175/1520-0434(2004)019<0310:OTROTP>2.0.CO;2.
- Cook, A. R.; Schaefer, J. T. (August 2008). "The Relation of El Niño–Southern Oscillation (ENSO) to Winter Tornado Outbreaks". Monthly Weather Review. 136 (8): 3135. Bibcode:2008MWRv..136.3121C. doi:10.1175/2007MWR2171.1.
- Grazulis, Thomas P. (July 1993). Significant Tornadoes 1680–1991: A Chronology and Analysis of Events. St. Johnsbury, Vermont: The Tornado Project of Environmental Films. ISBN 1-879362-03-1.
- Grazulis, Thomas P. (2001a). The Tornado: Nature's Ultimate Windstorm. Norman: University of Oklahoma Press. ISBN 978-0-8061-3538-0.
- Grazulis, Thomas P. (2001b). F5-F6 Tornadoes. St. Johnsbury, Vermont: The Tornado Project of Environmental Films.
- Hagemeyer, Bartlett C. (September 1997). "Peninsular Florida Tornado Outbreaks". Weather and Forecasting. 12 (3). Boston: American Meteorological Society: 400. Bibcode:1997WtFor..12..399H. doi:10.1175/1520-0434(1997)012<0399:PFTO>2.0.CO;2.
- National Weather Service (February 1998). Storm Data Publication (Report). National Centers for Environmental Information – via Storm Events Database.
- National Weather Service (February 1998). "Storm Data and Unusual Weather Phenomena". Storm Data. 40 (2). Asheville, North Carolina: National Climatic Data Center.
- Sharp, David W.; Cristaldi, Anthony J.; Spratt, Scott M.; et al. (October 22, 1998). Multifaceted General Overview of the East Central Florida Tornado Outbreak of 22–23 February 1998 (PDF). NWS WFO Melbourne, Florida (Report). Melbourne, Florida: National Weather Service. Archived from the original (PDF) on November 29, 2011.
- United States Department of Commerce (June 1998). Central Florida Tornado Outbreak February 22–23, 1998 (PDF). National Weather Service (Report). Service Assessment. Silver Spring, Maryland: National Oceanic and Atmospheric Administration.
