= Tornadoes in the United States =

Tornadoes in the United States 1950-2019

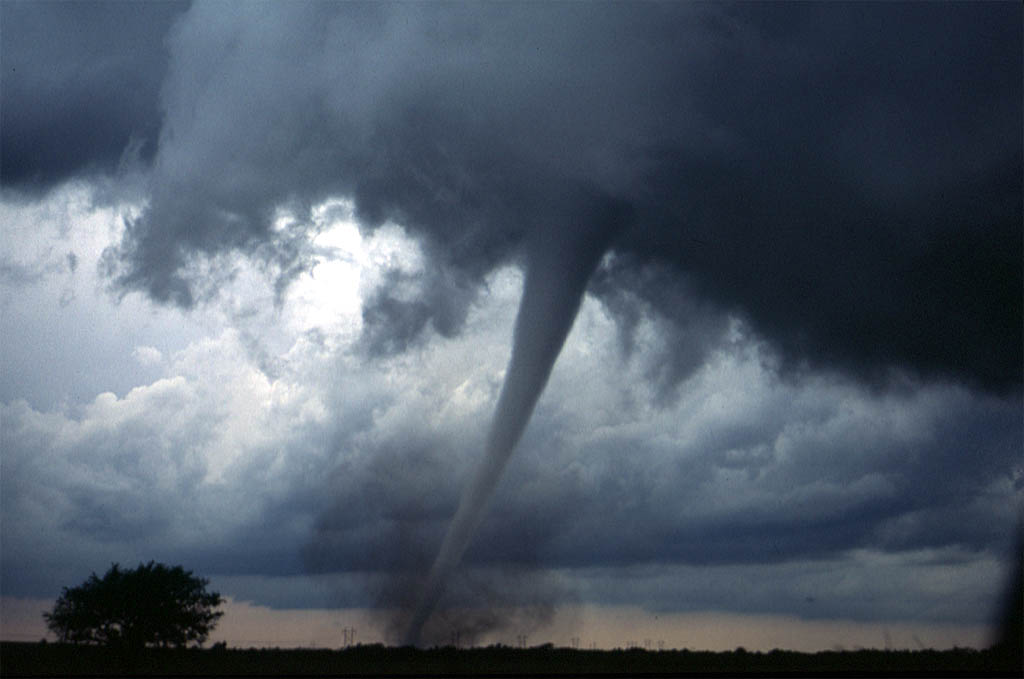
A tornado strikes near Anadarko, Oklahoma. This was part of the 1999 Oklahoma tornado outbreak on May 3, 1999.

Tornadoes in the United States are more common than in any other country. The United States receives more than 1,200 tornadoes annually—four times the amount seen in Europe. Violent tornadoes—those rated EF4 or EF5 on the Enhanced Fujita scale—occur more often in the United States than in any other country.

== Seasonality ==
Although favorable conditions for tornadoes in the United States can occur at any time, they are most common in spring and least common in winter. Because spring is a transitional period for the climate, there are more chances of cooler air meeting with warmer air, resulting in more thunderstorms. Tornadoes can also be spawned by landfalling tropical cyclones, which usually occur in late summer and autumn. In the United States, thunderstorms capable of producing tornadoes usually form when the temperature is at its highest, typically from 4:00 p.m. to 7:00 p.m.

Although the period in which most tornadoes strike ("tornado season") is March through June, tornadoes—including violent tornadoes and major tornado outbreaks—have been documented in the United States during every month and day of the year. Two examples of this are when a series of tornadoes hit the state of Indiana on November 22, 1992, and injured at least nine people. Another notable non-season tornado was where a tornado struck the area of McLean County, Illinois. Even though the tornado was during a winter month, it blew 20 railroad cars off their tracks, and hauled a camper over 100 yards (91 m).

During the winter months of the year, tornadoes have been known to hit the Southern United States and Southeastern United States the most, but have hit other areas as well. One notable recent example of a winter tornado outbreak was the 2008 Super Tuesday tornado outbreak on February 5 and February 6, 2008. 87 tornadoes occurred over the course of the outbreak. The storm system produced several destructive tornadoes in heavily populated areas, most notably in the Memphis metropolitan area, in Jackson, Tennessee, and the northeastern end of the Nashville metropolitan area. At least 57 people were killed across four states and 18 counties, with hundreds of others injured. The outbreak was the deadliest of the modern NEXRAD doppler radar era, until the 2011 Super Outbreak killed over 348 people (324 of which were tornado-related). It was the deadliest single outbreak since the May 31, 1985, outbreak, which killed 76 across Ohio and Pennsylvania, as well claiming 12 victims in Ontario, Canada. It was also the deadliest outbreak in both Tennessee and Kentucky since the 1974 Super Outbreak.

Usually, tornadoes hit specific areas of the United States in specific seasons. During the winter months, tornadoes are usually spotted in the Southern area of the country, as well as states near the Gulf of Mexico. This is due to cold air moving southward reaching its southern limit of expansion, and stopping over the Gulf Coast. As spring comes, hot air progressively moves back into the Gulf Coast. This pushes the mass of colder air forward out of the Gulf States and into the Southeastern states, where tornado frequency is highest in April.

As spring passes and summer begins, the mass of warm moist air moves northwest into the Great Plains and Midwestern states. During the months of May and June, tornado activity is as its peak in the southern Great Plains. The air mass then moves northward into the Northern Great Plains and the Great Lakes area, causing a tornado activity peak in these areas during the summer months. During the late summer and early fall months, tornado activity in the United States tapers off. This is due to the relatively small difference between the temperature at the boundary of the hot air mass and the cool air mass at that time and an extension of the Bermuda High sitting over parts of the United States. Though there may be some thunderstorms, they don't often become severe enough to spawn tornadoes.

Tornadoes may be formed out of season, especially during the months of hurricane season in the Gulf Coast states and Southeastern states. Because these areas are prone to hurricanes, they may be struck with tornadoes that are spawned from hurricanes. Tornadoes are most likely to form in the right-front quadrant of the hurricane, but can also form in rain bands associated with the storm. This is caused by the large amount of vertical wind shear to the right of the storm. Tornadoes are also spawned from U.S. hurricanes due to the moistness of the air at the landfall of the storm, which makes conditions favorable for a supercell storm to develop within the hurricane. Inside thunderclouds, warm, humid air rises, while cool air falls--along with rain or hail. These conditions can cause spinning air currents inside the cloud. Although the spinning currents start out horizontal, they can turn vertical and drop down from the cloud--becoming a tornado.

== Regional activity ==
Average annual tornado reports in the United States

Tornadoes have been documented in every U.S. state (not including the non-state territories of Guam, the Virgin Islands, American Samoa, and Puerto Rico) at least once since 1950, although some regions and states are hit by tornadoes far more than others. For example, the average number of tornadoes to hit the states of California, Oregon, and Nevada is less than one, while the state of Oklahoma receives an average of 52 tornadoes per year, and the state of Texas is hit with an average of 126 tornadoes per year. The state with the most tornadoes per unit area is Florida; though many are not tornadoes rated in the highest categories of intensity, they are strong enough to cause death or severe property damage. A number of Florida's tornadoes occur along the edge of hurricanes that strike the state. The state with the highest number of strong tornadoes per unit area is Oklahoma, with the state's Cleveland County having the most tornadoes per square mile. States such as Oklahoma and Kansas have lower population densities, so tornadoes in those states, while severe, may cause somewhat less property damage.

Most tornadoes in the United States occur east of the Rocky Mountains. The Great Plains, the Midwest, the Mississippi Valley and the southern United States are all areas that are vulnerable to tornadoes. They are relatively rare west of the Rockies and are also less frequent in the northeastern states. Tornado Alley is a colloquial term for an area particularly prone to tornadoes. There is no officially defined 'Tornado Alley' – at its broadest this area stretches from northern Texas to Canada with its core centered on Oklahoma, Kansas and northern Texas. Another highly significant region – colloquially known as Dixie Alley – is the southern United States and particularly the northern and central parts of Alabama and Mississippi. Florida is one of the most tornado-prone states. However, Florida tornadoes only rarely approach the strength of those that occur elsewhere.

=== Midwest ===
The Midwestern states are very prone to tornado activity, as they are part of "Tornado Alley." Some states in the area that may be hit by tornadoes frequently include Oklahoma, Kansas, Illinois, Indiana, and Iowa. The Midwestern states are often hit by tornadoes during the late spring and early summer months, especially the months of May and June. This is due to the aforementioned air mass moving northward into the Midwest and combining with another air mass that move southward from Canada. This creates unstable air, creating the potential for storms to strike the most during these months. The frequency begins to decrease in the middle of the summer, as the air mass moves northward into the Great Lakes states.

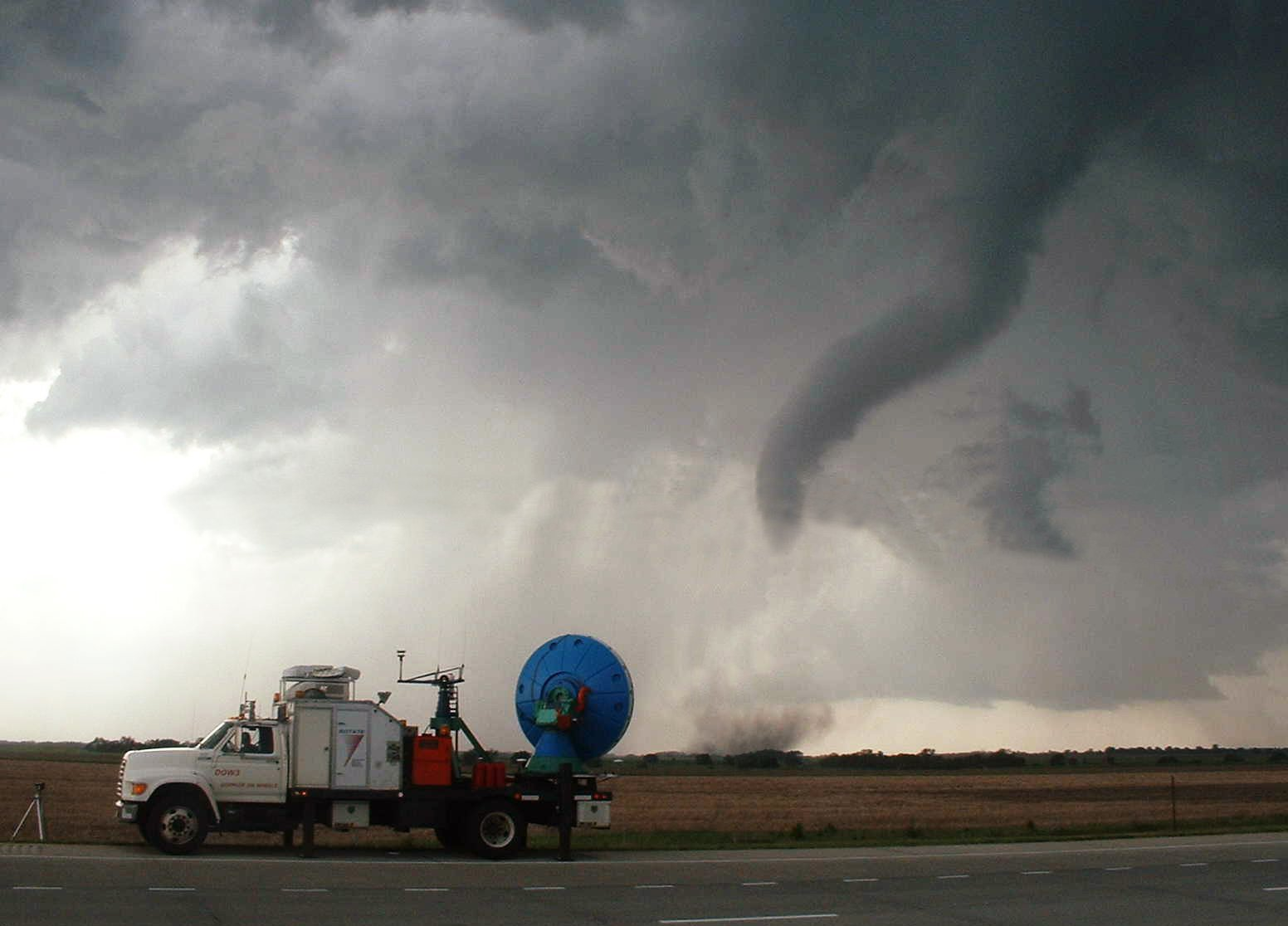
A Doppler On Wheels unit observing a tornado near Attica, Kansas

A notable storm that has hit this area was the Greensburg tornado, in the tornado outbreak of May 4–6, 2007. The tornado apparently strengthened as it neared Northwood, and at 9:38 pm CDT (0238 UTC), storm chasers reported that it had grown to over 1/2 mile (0.8 km) in diameter. Several satellite tornadoes were observed as the very large wedge approached the town of Greensburg, Kansas. It was an estimated 1.7 miles (2.7 km) in diameter and was later confirmed to have been an EF5 on the Enhanced Fujita Scale (the highest possible rating). Based on the damage produced, winds inside the tornado were estimated to have been in excess of 205 mph (92 m/s; 330 km/h).

Nebraska is fifth overall for sheer numbers of tornadoes, while Indiana has had 88 violent tornado reports from the 1950–2006 period, more than any state except Oklahoma. Iowa reported 3,900 almost as many as Texas. The deadliest tornado in US history, the Tri-State Tornado, struck Missouri, Illinois, and Indiana in March 1925. St. Louis, Missouri and neighboring East St. Louis, Illinois have been hit more than once by violent tornadoes, the most notorious of which was the St. Louis Tornado of May 1896. The New Richmond Tornado of May 1899 and the Flint, Michigan tornado of June 1953 also rank amongst the deadliest tornadoes in US history. The region was badly hit by the Palm Sunday Tornado Outbreak in April 1965 and by the Super Outbreak of April 1974. According to NCDC figures for the 1950 to 2006 period, Nebraska reported 2,440 tornadoes followed by Iowa (2,185), Illinois (2,086), Missouri (1,922), South Dakota (1,487), Minnesota (1,477), Indiana (1,327), North Dakota (1,216), Wisconsin (1,185), Michigan (981), and Ohio (916).

=== South ===
The Southern United States has suffered more tornado fatalities than any other part of the country. Some areas experience repeated damaging tornado events, such as the Tennessee Valley and in northern Alabama. The state of Alabama is tied for the most reported F5 tornadoes. For the period 1950 to 2006, three hundred and fifty eight people were killed by tornadoes in Alabama, ranking the state third nationwide behind Texas (521) and neighboring Mississippi (404). Fourth is Arkansas (336) and fifth is Tennessee with 271 fatalities.

Tornado disasters to affect the southern USA include the Great Natchez Tornado of May 1840 – second deadliest on record in the US, behind only the Tri-State Tornado. Other outbreaks included the Tupelo-Gainesville tornado outbreak of April 1936, the 1908 Southeast tornado outbreak of April 1908 and the Candlestick Park Tornado of 1966. Alabama and Kentucky were very badly affected by the Super Outbreak of 1974. The 2008 Super Tuesday tornado outbreak was the deadliest tornado outbreak in the US in 23 years. 58 people lost their lives with Tennessee, Arkansas, and Kentucky particularly badly affected. The 2011 Super Outbreak devastated much of the South, leaving 348 people dead.

Hurricanes and other tropical storms can also generate tornadoes. Louisiana and the coastal regions of Mississippi and Alabama are most at risk from these storms. The Atlantic seaboard states can be affected too. According to NCDC figures for the 1950 to 2006 period, Mississippi reported 1,787 tornadoes, followed by Louisiana (1,644), Alabama (1,608), Arkansas (1,579), Georgia (1,324), North Carolina (1,042), Tennessee (892), South Carolina (819), Kentucky (710) and Virginia (565). West Virginia, by contrast, is one of the least vulnerable states of all with just 120 tornadoes reported over the period.

=== East and Northeast ===
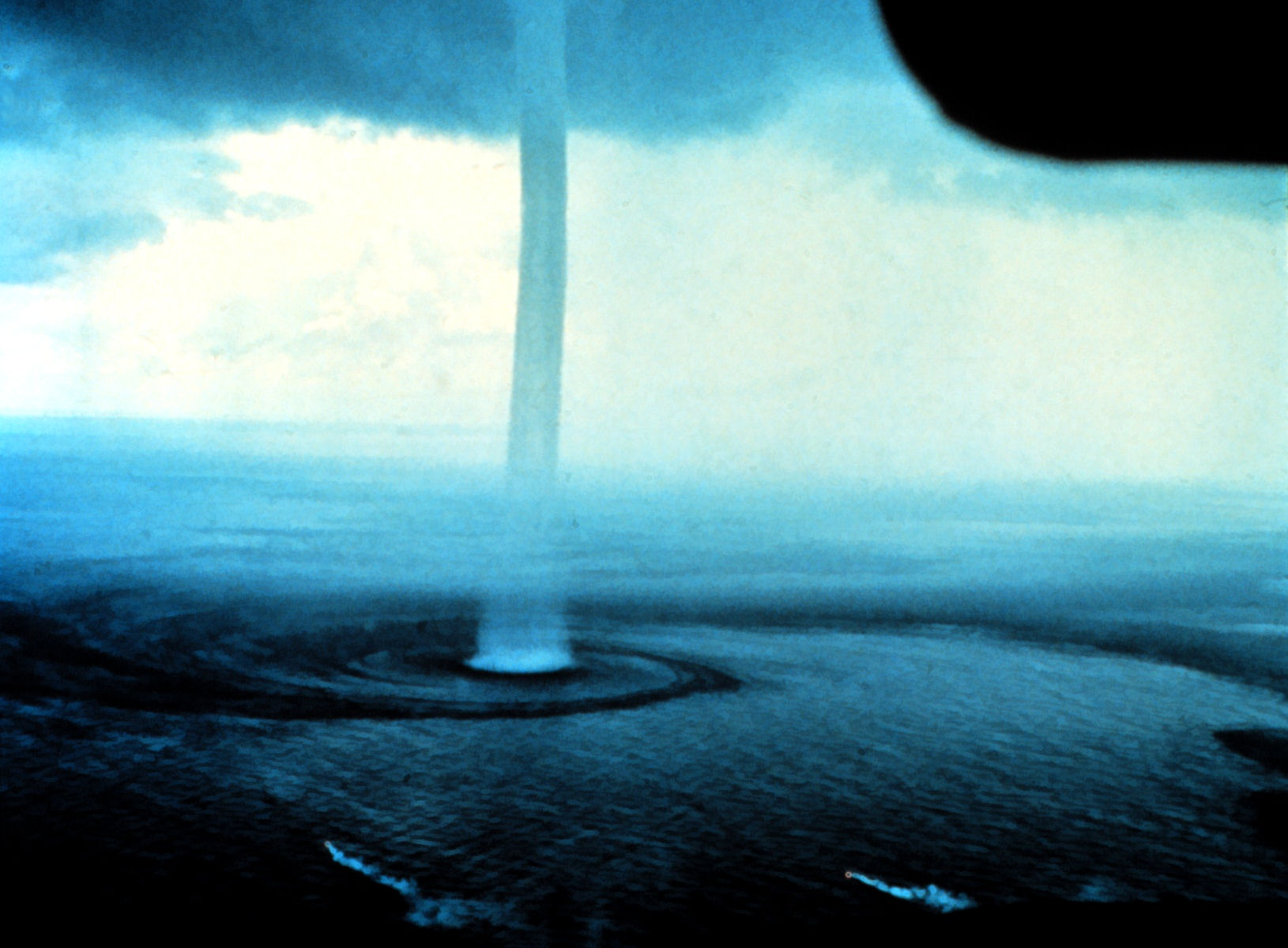
A waterspout near Florida

The Northeastern U.S. to the east of the Appalachian Mountains is much less vulnerable to violent tornadoes but is by no means immune. One of the most extraordinary tornadoes in history struck Worcester, Massachusetts. This F4 tornado struck the city on 9 June 1953 and killed 90 people. The tornado was generated by the same storm system that hit Flint, Michigan with a devastating F5 tornado that killed 116 people.

Areas further south – notably Pennsylvania and Maryland – and areas to the west of the Appalachians are more vulnerable to tornadoes. NCDC figures for the period 1950 to 2006 show that Pennsylvania reported 697 tornadoes, followed by New York State (358), Maryland (269), Massachusetts (153), New Jersey (144), Maine (101), New Hampshire (86), Connecticut (82), Delaware (58), Vermont (37), Rhode Island (9), and the District of Columbia (1). The worst tornado outbreak in the Northeast occurred in Pennsylvania on May 31, 1985, and produced the only F5 tornado in the region to date.

Florida is one of the most tornado prone states, with only Texas, Kansas and Oklahoma reporting more storms. During the period 1950 to 2006, Florida reported 2,884 tornadoes according to NCDC figures. However, Florida tornadoes are usually weak in comparison with those that strike the Plains and the Southern states – there have been only four reports of F4 strength tornadoes since 1950 and none of F5 strength. Florida experiences more thunderstorms than any other state but fewer supercell storms. Florida tornadoes are more often spawned by the frequent ordinary thunderstorms that occur over the state. Hurricanes and other tropical storms can generate large numbers of tornadoes, with a notable example being the significant outbreak spawned by Hurricane Milton in October 2024. Non-supercell tornadoes are rarely as strong as supercell-generated storms.

Florida's most violent tornadoes generally occur during the winter months, when the state is most vulnerable to invasions of cold air that help generate such storms. In recent years, there have been some particularly disastrous tornado events. During the night of February 22 and 23, 1998, an F3 tornado struck Kissimmee, killing 25 people, and, later that night, another F3 tornado struck Seminole and Volusia counties, killing 13 people. On February 2, 2007, an EF3 tornado struck Lake County, killing 21 people.

=== West and Southwest ===
Of the states around the Rocky Mountains, Colorado reports by far the greatest numbers of tornadoes. Eastern Colorado, both climatically and physically, has much more in common with the neighboring Plains states of Kansas and Nebraska than with the mountainous areas further west. Small cities such as Limon, Kit Carson, Thurman, and Flagler are some places in Eastern Colorado that have experienced dangerous tornadoes. The same can be said, to a lesser extent, of eastern Wyoming. Tornadoes are less frequent in mountainous areas. Of the states in this region – according to NCDC figures for the 1950 to 2006 period – Colorado reported 1,617 tornadoes, followed by Wyoming with 560, Montana (345), Idaho (175), and Utah (114).

In the Southwestern United States, New Mexico reported 485 tornadoes during the 1950 to 2006 period (NCDC figures), California reported 355, Arizona reported 209, and Nevada reported 75. New Mexico borders the notoriously tornado prone states of Texas and Oklahoma, hence the noticeably higher figures. Most of the tornadoes here happen in the very eastern part of the state. New Mexico's region and the desert landscape of the state help prevent the amount of twisters that happen in Oklahoma and Texas. Arizona and New Mexico experience regular summer thunderstorms during their monsoon season. These are sometimes tornadic but rarely produce violent tornadoes.

The Pacific Northwest is perhaps the least vulnerable region. NCDC figures for the 1950 to 2006 period show that Washington reported just 96 tornadoes for the entire period and that Oregon reported 91. However, Portland, Oregon and neighboring Vancouver, Washington were hit by a deadly tornado on 5 April 1972. This storm was the deadliest to hit the United States that year.

== Intensity ==
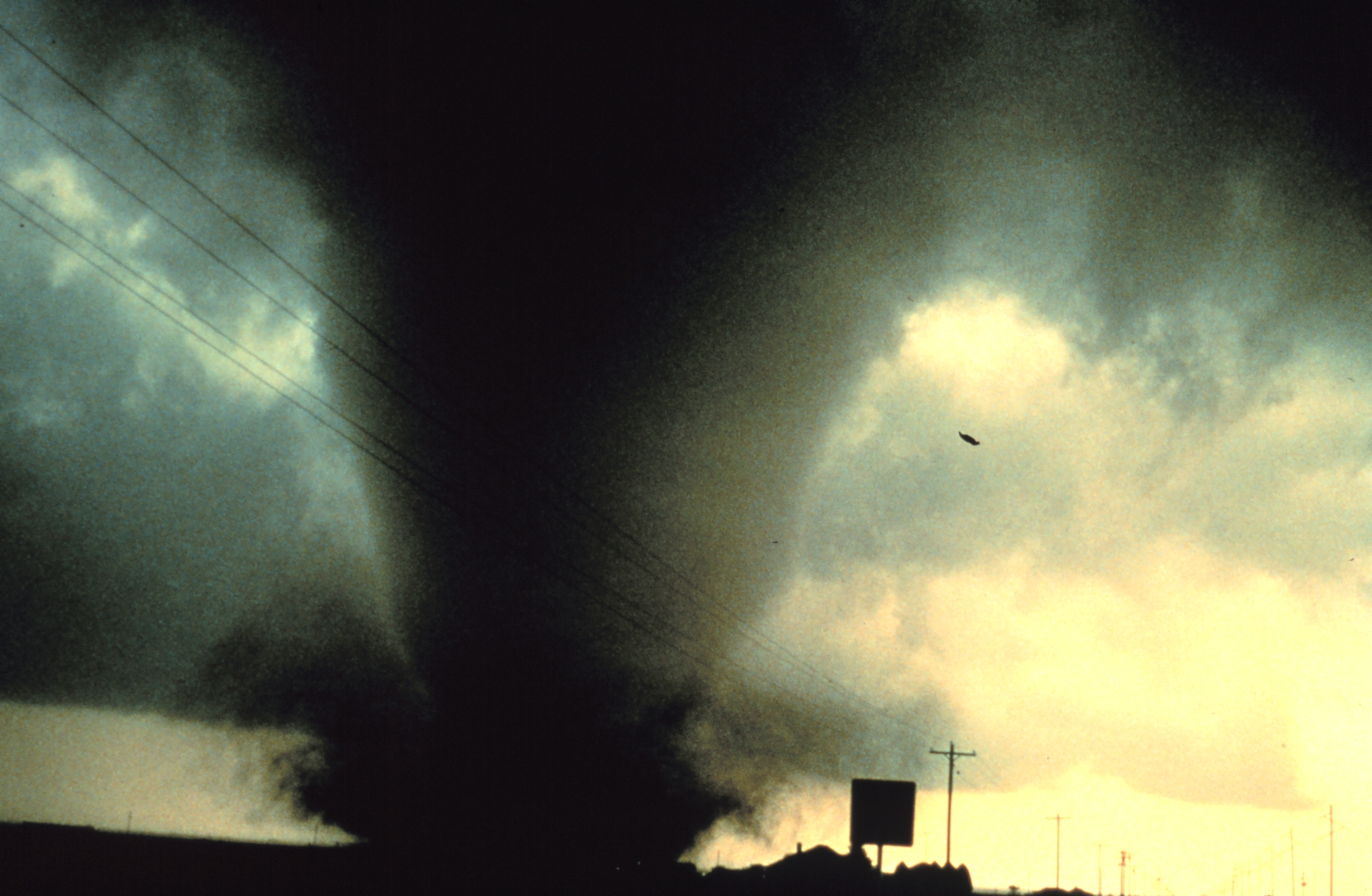
A powerful F2 tornado hits the town of Dimmitt, Texas.

Tornadoes' damage varies based on their wind speeds and where they strike. The Enhanced Fujita Scale classifies a tornado by its damage and then uses that classification to estimate the tornado's wind speed. For example, if it causes very little damage, then it is classified as an EF0 tornado and likely had very low winds. If damage from the tornado is severe enough, then it may be rated and likely had winds exceeding 200 mph (89 m/s; 320 km/h). In the United States, tornadoes have been known to form at high and low intensities. The probability of a high intensity or violent tornado differs by location across the country. For example, due to the high frequency of tornadoes in the "Tornado Alley" area mentioned before, a more violent tornado would be more likely to form there due to the strength of the thunderstorms produced by the two bordering air masses. The states with the highest number of F5 and EF5 rated tornadoes since data was available in 1950 are Alabama and Oklahoma, each with seven tornadoes. Iowa, Kansas, and Texas each are tied for second-most with six. The state with the highest number of F5 and EF5 tornadoes per square mile, however, was Iowa. Since 1950, the state with the most violent (EF4/F4+) tornadoes is Oklahoma with 68.

Tornadoes that are classified as EF4 and EF5 (or "violent tornadoes") on the Enhanced Fujita Scale only account for an average of two percent of all tornadoes in the United States each year. However, these high-intensity storms do account for an average of seventy percent of all tornado-related deaths in the United States each year. These storms can have winds of over 200 miles per hour (320 km/h) and stay on the ground for over an hour.

The United States has seen 60 F5 and EF5 (the highest intensity and damage ranking) tornadoes since records began in 1950. No tornadoes prior to 1950 were officially ranked F5, due to inadequate engineering data and other information on the historical tornadoes. From 1950–1970 tornadoes were assessed retrogressively, primarily using information recorded in government databases, and newspaper photographs and descriptions. Beginning in 1971, tornadoes were rated by the NWS using on-site damage surveys.

On May 3, 1999, a storm produced a violent tornado in the vicinity of Oklahoma City and was a part of the 1999 Oklahoma tornado outbreak, which also brought many violent storms to the states of Kansas, Arkansas, and Tennessee. In total, the storm produced 66 tornadoes over four states. The strong F5 storm took place near the town of Bridge Creek, Oklahoma, located in Grady County. During the storm, a group of students in meteorology from the University of Oklahoma had chased the storm on a Doppler on Wheels (or DOW), which scans storms while attached to a car. Doppler on Wheels data from the nearby storm revealed winds of 301 ± 20 miles per hour (484 ± 32 km/h), which was over the wind speed in the F5 classification of that time. Though the wind speed was over the F5 maximum, the tornado was not named the first ever F6 storm, as there was no F6 classification. Other scientists reviewed the DOW data taken by the students, and concluded that the estimated wind speed may have been inaccurate, but still over 300 miles per hour (130 m/s). Also, the wind speed recorded was taken from over 200 feet (61 m) above ground level. The National Weather Service also did a damage check, and found that the damage was that of an average F5 tornado.

== Impacts ==
=== Injuries and fatalities ===
In the United States, over 80 deaths and 1,500 injuries are associated with tornadoes each year. According to the National Oceanic Atmospheric Administration, most tornado deaths are caused by people not following instructions on what to do the right way. They also mention that some people are not even warned that a tornadic storm is coming, while others get a warning but do not believe that a tornado will hit their area. In 2012, 68 people were killed by tornadoes in the United States. Kentucky had the most fatalities, 22. Kentucky was followed by Indiana (13), Illinois (9), Missouri and Oklahoma (6), Ohio (4), Alabama and Tennessee (3), and Florida and Kansas (1). Over time, it has gradually gotten worse. Between January and May of 2024, 1,117 tornadoes were detected, highest since 2011. They are also appearing in locations where tornadoes are historically rare, like California.

Over 39 percent of all tornado-related deaths and many injuries come from residents of mobile homes. It is a widespread myth that tornadoes are "attracted" to mobile home parks, and cause the most fatalities there because they hit there the most. This is not true. However, mobile homes do often have poor construction and do not provide adequate protection during a tornado event. An example to confirm this occurred in April 1991, when a very powerful tornado struck the town of Andover, Kansas. When the town was hit, eighty-four homes and fourteen businesses were destroyed by the tornado, but with no fatalities and only minor injuries. After the tornado hit Andover, it swept through a mobile home park consisting of 223 trailers. The park did have a tornado shelter, to which over 200 residents fled and survived without injuries. Others that did not take shelter in the tornado shelter stayed in their mobile homes, and thirteen of them were killed by the tornado.

=== Damages ===
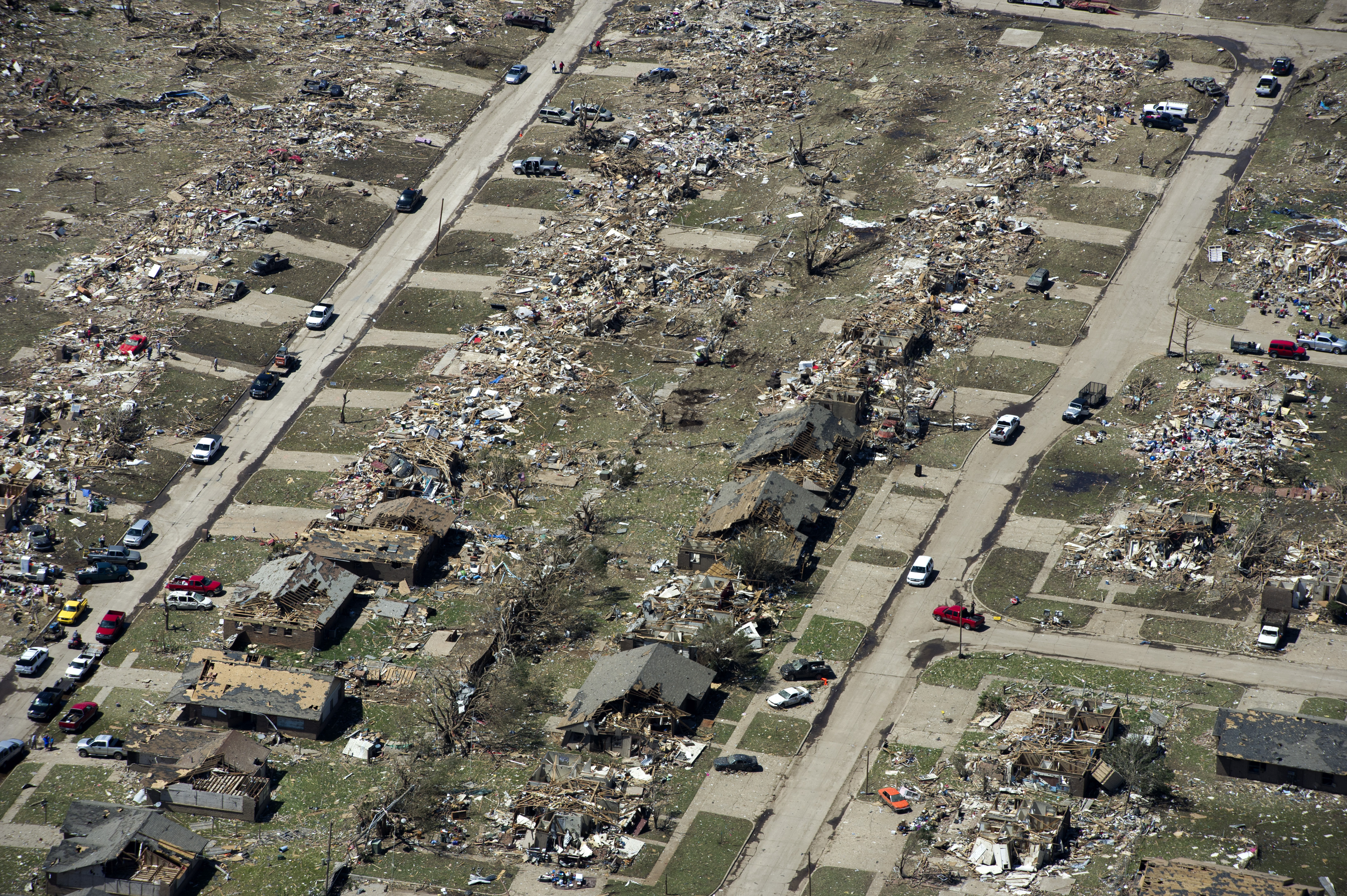
On May 20, 2013, a large tornado of the highest category, EF5, ravaged Moore, Oklahoma.

The Enhanced Fujita Scale classifies tornado strength from weakest - an EF0 tornado - to strongest - an EF5 tornado - based on damage caused to property and infrastructure.

An EF0 tornado has estimated wind speeds from 65–85 mph (29–38 m/s; 105–137 km/h) which usually results in minor structural damage and broken tree limbs.

An EF5 tornado has estimated wind speeds of greater than 200 mph (89 m/s; 320 km/h) and can destroy reinforced concrete structures and well-built homes, reducing them to piles of rubble or sweeping them entirely off their foundations or slabs.

When a tornado cannot be rated because there is no evidence that it caused structural or other relevant damage (which often occurs when a tornado touches down in unpopulated rural areas), it is classified as an EFU - U meaning "unknown" - tornado.

== Forecasting ==
Until recently there was little hope of forecasting these systems. Meteorologists could identify those conditions that were likely to produce severe weather and generate a watch. If a tornado was spotted a warning was issued. However, there's not much lead time for tornado warnings, thus reducing the ability for people to reach safety. More recently Doppler radar allows investigators to see a circulation develop in the storm. Because of their size and intensity, there are few storm observations. Increasing information has been gathered in the field from those chasing the storm. The use of artificial intelligence and machine learning are being utilized to create better forecasting system for tornadoes.

== See also ==
- Tornado climatology
- List of North American tornadoes and tornado outbreaks
- List of F5 and EF5 tornadoes
- Climate of the United States

== Bibliography ==
- Douglas, Paul (2007). Restless Skies: The Ultimate Weather Book. New York City: Sterling Publishing. ISBN 978-1402752230.
- Bluestein, Howard B. (2006). Tornado Alley: Monster Storms of the Great Plains. Oxford, England: Oxford University Press. ISBN 0195307119.
- Lyons, Walter A. (1997). The Handy Weather Answer Book. New York City: Visible Ink Press. ISBN 0787610348.
