= Tornado outbreak of April 15, 1958 =

Severe weather event in Florida and Georgia, USA

Tornado outbreak
- Tornadoes: 5
- Max. rating: F4 tornado
- Duration: April 15, 1958

Overall effects
- Fatalities: None (+4 indirect)
- Injuries: 36 (+1 indirect)
- Damage: ≥ $316,500 ($3,530,000 in 2025 USD)
- Areas affected: Peninsular Florida; Georgia
- Part of the tornadoes and tornado outbreaks of 1958

On Tuesday, April 15, 1958, a tornado outbreak produced severe weather over peninsular Florida and part of neighboring Georgia. A total of five tornadoes occurred, a few of which produced F3-level damage; one tornado, in Polk County, Florida, was officially ranked F4, one of only two such Florida events on record, but its rating was contested by tornado historian Thomas P. Grazulis. The only other F4 tornado to hit Florida occurred on April 4, 1966, also in Polk County, near Gibsonia and Galloway. In total, 36 people were injured during the outbreak, but no deaths were directly related to the tornadoes. However, four airmen flying through a severe thunderstorm in the Tampa Bay area went missing following the crash of their jet and were presumed dead. (Note: An outbreak is generally defined as a group of at least six tornadoes with no more than a six-hour gap between individual tornadoes; however, the threshold varies slightly according to local climatology. On the Florida peninsula, an outbreak consists of at least four tornadoes occurring relatively synchronously—no more than four hours apart.)

== Confirmed tornadoes ==
Confirmed tornadoes by Fujita rating
FU	F0	F1	F2	F3	F4	F5	Total
0	0	2	0	2	1	0	5

Prior to 1990, there is a likely undercount of tornadoes, particularly E/F0–1, with reports of weaker tornadoes becoming more common as population increased. A sharp increase in the annual average E/F0–1 count by approximately 200 tornadoes was noted upon the implementation of NEXRAD Doppler weather radar in 1990–1991. (Note: Historically, the number of tornadoes globally and in the United States was and is likely underrepresented: research by Grazulis on annual tornado activity suggests that, as of 2001, only 53% of yearly U.S. tornadoes were officially recorded. Documentation of tornadoes outside the United States was historically less exhaustive, owing to the lack of monitors in many nations and, in some cases, to internal political controls on public information. Most countries only recorded tornadoes that produced severe damage or loss of life. Significant low biases in U.S. tornado counts likely occurred through the early 1990s, when advanced NEXRAD was first installed and the National Weather Service began comprehensively verifying tornado occurrences.) 1974 marked the first year where significant tornado (E/F2+) counts became homogenous with contemporary values, attributed to the consistent implementation of Fujita scale assessments. (Note: The Fujita scale was devised under the aegis of scientist T. Theodore Fujita in the early 1970s. Prior to the advent of the scale in 1971, tornadoes in the United States were officially unrated. Tornado ratings were retroactively applied to events prior to the formal adoption of the F-scale by the National Weather Service. While the Fujita scale has been superseded by the Enhanced Fujita scale in the U.S. since February 1, 2007, Canada used the old scale until April 1, 2013; nations elsewhere, like the United Kingdom, apply other classifications such as the TORRO scale.) Numerous discrepancies on the details of tornadoes in this outbreak exist between sources. The total count of tornadoes and ratings differs from various agencies accordingly. The list below documents information from the most contemporary official sources alongside assessments from Grazulis.

Color/symbol key
Color / symbol	Description
†	Data from Grazulis 1990/1993/2001b
¶	Data from newspapers
※	Data from the 1958 Climatological Data National Summary publication
‡	Data from the NCEI database
♯	Maximum width of tornado
±	Tornado was rated below F2 intensity by Grazulis but a specific rating is unavailable.

Confirmed tornadoes – Tuesday, April 15, 1958
F#	Location	County / Parish	State	Start Coord. (Note: All starting coordinates are based on the NCEI database and may not reflect contemporary analyses)	Time (UTC) (Note: All dates are based on the local time zone where the tornado touched down; however, all times are in Coordinated Universal Time and dates are split at midnight CST/CDT for consistency.)	Path length	Width (Note: The listed width values are primarily the average/mean width of the tornadoes, with those having known maximum widths denoted by ♯. From 1952 to 1994, reports largely list mean width whereas contemporary years list maximum width. Values provided by Grazulis are the average width, with estimates being rounded down (i.e. 0.5 mi (0.80 km) is rounded down from 880 yards to 800 yards.)	Damage (Note: The National Oceanic and Atmospheric Administration's Storm Data publication does not list exact damage totals for every event, instead giving damage categories. As such, damage for individual tornadoes is not comprehensive.)
F1	Mullet Key to near Wimauma※	Pinellas¶, Manatee¶, Hillsborough	FL	27.70°N 82.50°W	17:20–?	≥0.5 mi (0.80 km)	33 yd (30 m)	≥$14,000¶
F1	See section on this tornado							
F3	Northwestern St. Augustine※	St. Johns	FL	29.87°N 81.30°W	17:20–?	3 mi (4.8 km)※	73 yd (67 m)‡	$250,000
F3	A tornado destroyed half a dozen homes in Ponce de Leon Heights and Santa Rosa, a pair of subdivisions on the northern outskirts of St. Augustine. In addition, it damaged eight to 15 homes and destroyed or damaged up to 12 other structures, injuring nine people. Grazulis rated it F2. The NCEI incorrectly list the path as being north-northwest of St. Augustine Beach.							
F4	N of Bareah to S of Frostproof¶	Polk	FL	27.67°N 82.62°W	17:30–?¶	5 mi (8.0 km)†	300 yd (270 m)	Unknown
F4	See section on this tornado							
F3	Fort Pierce	St. Lucie	FL	27.50°N 80.57°W	18:09–?	13 mi (21 km)※	100 yd (91 m)†	$500,000¶
F3	See section on this tornado							
F1	Riddleville	Washington	GA	32.90°N 82.67°W	21:30–?	0.8 mi (1.3 km)	200 yd (180 m)	$2,500
F1	A tornado leveled three vacant homes and a barn. It also damaged a few more homes.							

=== Mullet Key–Piney Point–Sun City–Gulf City–Ruskin–Wimauma, Florida ===
Mullet Key–Piney Point–Sun City–Gulf City–Ruskin–Wimauma, Florida
F1 tornado
- on the Fujita scale

Overall effects
- Fatalities: 4 indirect
- Injuries: 1 indirect
- Damage: ≥ $14,000 ($160,000 in 2025 USD)

This tornado affected areas in and near Fort DeSoto, Piney Point, Sun City, Gulf City, Ruskin, and Wimauma. Winds of 83 mph (134 km/h) attended the tornado on Mullet Key, extensively damaging bathhouses and outbuildings. Half of one bathhouse was torn off, an airplane's wing was bent out of shape, a shed was wrecked, and the metal roof of a museum was blown away. At Piney Point nine pump houses were pulled out of their concrete foundations and blown away. In and near this area, along the Manatee–Hillsborough county line, fragments of a shed were carried 1/2 mi (0.80 km); bits of tin were twisted around utility poles and lofted into treetops; and six mature oak trees were prostrated, a few of which fell onto a house, penetrating the roof and ceiling above the living room, and caused glass to shatter. Metal roofing slats were torn off a tractor shed as well. A newly-built barn in Ruskin was shifted 6 ft (2.0 yd) off its foundation, and a 14-year-old girl was injured while reacting to the approach of the tornado. Fencing, signage, and trees were felled. A 1/2-mile-long (0.80 km) swath of debris was noted just south of Sun City.

One B-47 bomber, departing from MacDill Air Force Base at around 9:30 a.m. local time, was destroyed when it encountered the parent thunderstorm. The plane unsuccessfully attempted to fly at lower altitudes and avoid it, but instead caught fire 800 ft (240 m) above the Sunshine Skyway Bridge and disintegrated. Its four crew members were not found and presumed dead, a few of whom had excelled in navigation and bombing examinations by the Strategic Air Command. Parts of the aircraft were found on the Sunshine Skyway Bridge; other parts, including most of the aircraft, landed in Tampa Bay. Eyewitnesses reported that the aircraft resembled "'a huge ball of fire, like a comet'".

=== Bareah–Frostproof, Florida ===
Bareah–Frostproof, Florida
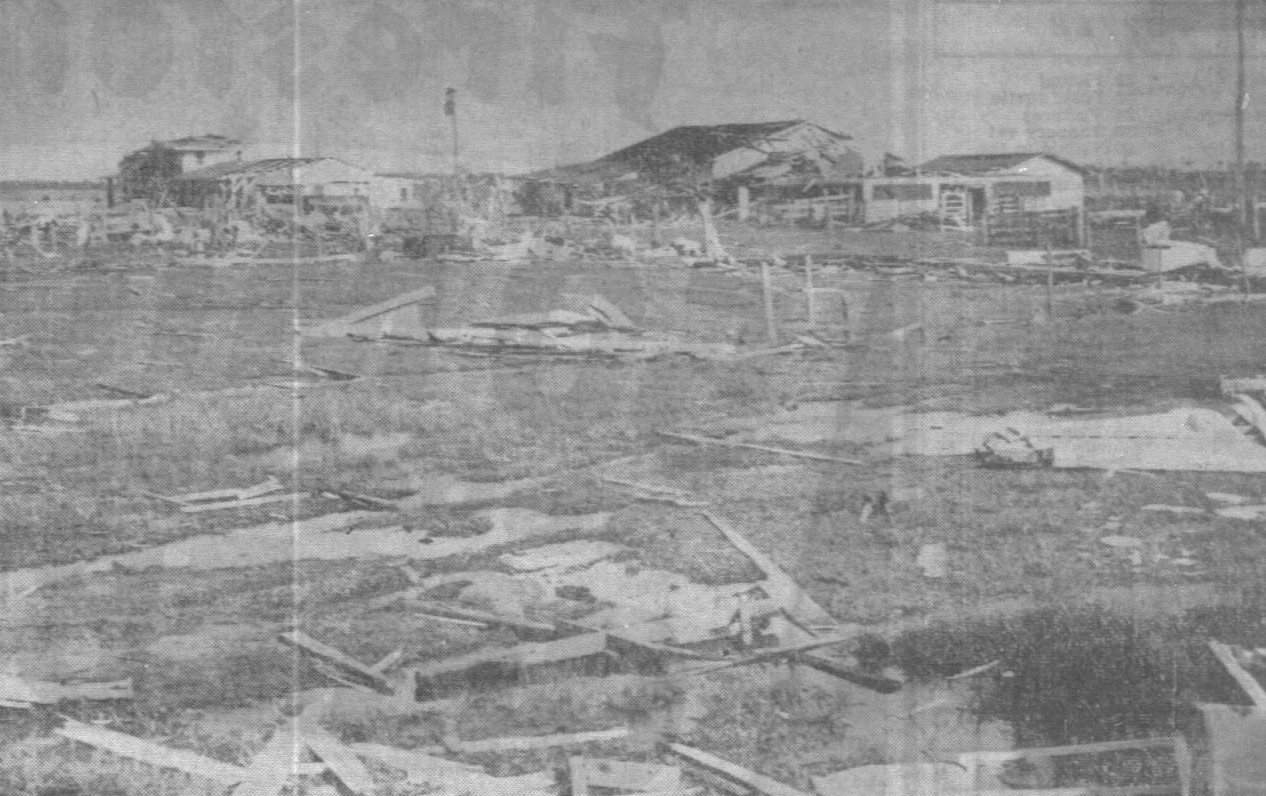
- A farm in Bereah after the tornado.

F4 tornado
- on the Fujita scale

Overall effects
- Injuries: 7

Short-lived but intense, this tornado destroyed nine small, mostly frame homes, all but one of which were poorly built, along with a few barns. A prefabricated home was swept away, except for its slabbed foundation and an attached toilet. A full 2,500-US-gallon (9,500 L) water tank was thrown almost 1 mi (1.6 km), a refrigerator was tossed 100 yd (300 ft), and an automobile was moved several hundred feet. A horse was carried 125 yd (375 ft) and one of its legs broken; a dog was fatally crushed as well. A barbed-wire fence was pulled out of the ground, a large truck tipped onto its side, and an automobile wrecked. Tin roofing littered trees and was bent around power poles for 3 mi (4.8 km). The tornado downed utility poles and trees before dissipating. Seven injuries occurred. The tornado is one of only a few official F4s to have hit Florida, the other having struck in 1966; however, its rating is disputed, as Grazulis ranked it F3.

=== Fort Pierce, Florida ===
Fort Pierce, Florida
Meteorological history
- Formed: April 15, 1958, 2:09 p.m. EDT (UTC−04:00)

F3 tornado
- on the Fujita scale

Overall effects
- Injuries: 20
- Damage: $1/2 million ($5,580,000 in 2025 USD)

The fourth tornado became the most destructive event of the outbreak, touching down near US 441 west of Fort Pierce in St. Lucie County. It moved east through the city's business district and moved offshore over the Atlantic Ocean. A total of 28 homes were demolished or received damage in the Fort Pierce area, while 200 additional buildings were destroyed or damaged as well. In addition, nine small residences were destroyed outside the city. Martial law was declared after the tornado struck the city, but it was lifted on April 16. Grapefruit was tossed from the trees, but growers salvaged the majority of the fruit from the ground. Most of the 20 injuries were inflicted by flying glass in the city's downtown business district. Initial estimates placed damages near $5,000,000, but later were deemed too high by the General Adjustments Bureau; final estimates placed damages near "over half million" or $0.5 million, according to press reports. Other E/F3s hit Fort Pierce on September 18, 1954, and October 9, 2024.

== See also ==
- List of North American tornadoes and tornado outbreaks

== Sources ==
- Agee, Ernest M.; Childs, Samuel (June 1, 2014). "Adjustments in Tornado Counts, F-Scale Intensity, and Path Width for Assessing Significant Tornado Destruction". Journal of Applied Meteorology and Climatology. 53 (6). American Meteorological Society: 1494–1505. Bibcode:2014JApMC..53.1494A. doi:10.1175/JAMC-D-13-0235.1.
- Brooks, Harold E. (April 2004). "On the Relationship of Tornado Path Length and Width to Intensity". Weather and Forecasting. 19 (2). Boston: American Meteorological Society: 310–19. Bibcode:2004WtFor..19..310B. doi:10.1175/1520-0434(2004)019<0310:OTROTP>2.0.CO;2.
- Cook, A. R.; Schaefer, J. T. (August 2008). Written at Norman, Oklahoma. "The Relation of El Niño–Southern Oscillation (ENSO) to Winter Tornado Outbreaks". Monthly Weather Review. 136 (8). Boston: American Meteorological Society: 3135. Bibcode:2008MWRv..136.3121C. doi:10.1175/2007MWR2171.1.
- Edwards, Roger; LaDue, James G.; Ferree, John T.; Scharfenberg, Kevin; Maier, Chris; Coulbourne, William L. (May 1, 2013). "Tornado Intensity Estimation: Past, Present, and Future". Bulletin of the American Meteorological Society. 94 (5). American Meteorological Society: 641–653. Bibcode:2013BAMS...94..641E. doi:10.1175/BAMS-D-11-00006.1.
- Grazulis, Thomas P. (November 1990). Significant Tornadoes 1880–1989. Vol. 2. St. Johnsbury, Vermont: The Tornado Project of Environmental Films. ISBN 1-879362-02-3.
- Grazulis, Thomas P. (July 1993). Significant Tornadoes 1680–1991: A Chronology and Analysis of Events. St. Johnsbury, Vermont: The Tornado Project of Environmental Films. ISBN 1-879362-03-1.
- Grazulis, Thomas P. (2001a). The Tornado: Nature's Ultimate Windstorm. Norman: University of Oklahoma Press. ISBN 978-0-8061-3538-0.
- Grazulis, Thomas P. (2001b). F5-F6 Tornadoes. St. Johnsbury, Vermont: The Tornado Project of Environmental Films.
- Hagemeyer, Bartlett C. (September 1997). "Peninsular Florida Tornado Outbreaks". Weather and Forecasting. 12 (3). Boston: American Meteorological Society: 400. Bibcode:1997WtFor..12..399H. doi:10.1175/1520-0434(1997)012<0399:PFTO>2.0.CO;2.
- National Weather Service (April 1958). Storm Data Publication (Report). National Centers for Environmental Information – via Storm Events Database.
- U.S. Weather Bureau (April 1958). "Storm data and unusual weather phenomena". Climatological Data National Summary. 9 (4). Asheville, North Carolina: National Climatic Data Center: 107–129.
