= 2007 Groundhog Day tornado outbreak =

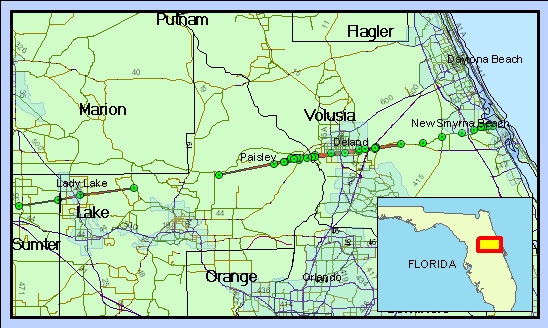
- Tracks of the three tornadoes in Florida

Meteorological history
- Date: February 2, 2007

Tornado outbreak
- Tornadoes: 4
- Max. rating: EF3 tornado
- Duration: 4 hours, 54 minutes

Overall effects
- Casualties: 21 fatalities; 76 injuries
- Damage: $218 million (2007 US$)
- Areas affected: Central Florida

The 2007 Groundhog Day tornado outbreak was a localized but devastating tornado event that took place in central Florida early on February 2, 2007. Early morning temperatures had risen well above average for the season; combined with increased moisture and a powerful jet stream, this created enough instability and wind shear for thunderstorms to rotate and spawn tornadoes. Due to the conditions, a long-tracked supercell formed and produced three tornadoes over one hour and seventeen minutes. The supercell resulted in a 70-mile (110-kilometer) trail of damage.

Twenty-one people were killed and 76 others were injured in the outbreak. The first tornado damaged 1,145 homes and destroyed 200 others in Sumter County before hitting the Lady Lake area where it killed eight people. A total of 180 homes were damaged and 101 homes were destroyed in Lake County. The second tornado killed 13 people in the Lake Mack area and damaged or destroyed over 500 homes and other structures during its existence, including the 1,500-foot (460-meter) tall transmission tower of WCFB FM. The final tornado damaged roofs, car ports and garage doors along its path through New Smyrna Beach. The outbreak was the second deadliest on record for Florida and caused an estimated $218 million in damage.

== Synopsis ==
Radar animation of the line of thunderstorms that produced the tornado

In east central Florida, a warm sector, a region of warm surface air between a cold front and a warm front, was positioned ahead of a progressing cold front. Large scale lift was supported by a very strong jet stream aloft, with strong vertical shear evident, conducive for rotating thunderstorms and tornadoes. Instability increased overnight with temperatures and dew points increasing through the pre-dawn hours. For example, northwest of Orlando, temperatures were still at 75 °F (24 °C), which was about 3 degrees warmer than the average high for the day and 14 degrees warmer than the average low. The conditions helped several thunderstorm cells to develop ahead of the cold front in a line, in the Gulf of Mexico. One of these thunderstorm cells matured into a supercell thunderstorm that remained intact, while other cells to its north failed to sustain themselves. The supercell had strong rotation visible on radar as it approached the western Florida Coast before it produced three tornadoes, two rated EF3 from Sumter County to the coastal waters of Volusia County during the early morning hours of February 2, 2007. After moving offshore, the main tornado-producing supercell quickly weakened and decayed into a bunch of showers, while another supercell produced an EF0 tornado four hours after the main supercell moved offshore.

At 3:06 am EST (0806 UTC), the National Weather Service (NWS) issued a tornado warning for northern Lake County until 4:00 am EST (0900 UTC). At 3:10 am EST (0810 UTC), the first tornado touched down near The Villages and traveled at 55 miles per hour (89 km/h) into Lake County. Five minutes after the tornado touched down, a severe weather update bulletin was issued by the NWS stating that there was a high likelihood of an extremely dangerous tornado and people in the path were in a life-threatening situation. The tornado received an EF3 rating on the Enhanced Fujita Scale and had a track length of 16.5 miles (26.6 km). Initially, the tornado was thought to have still been on the ground and a third bulletin was released at 3:34 am EST (0834 UTC). At this time, Doppler radar indicated that a tornado was forming or was on the ground roughly 5 miles (8.0 km) north of Umatilla.

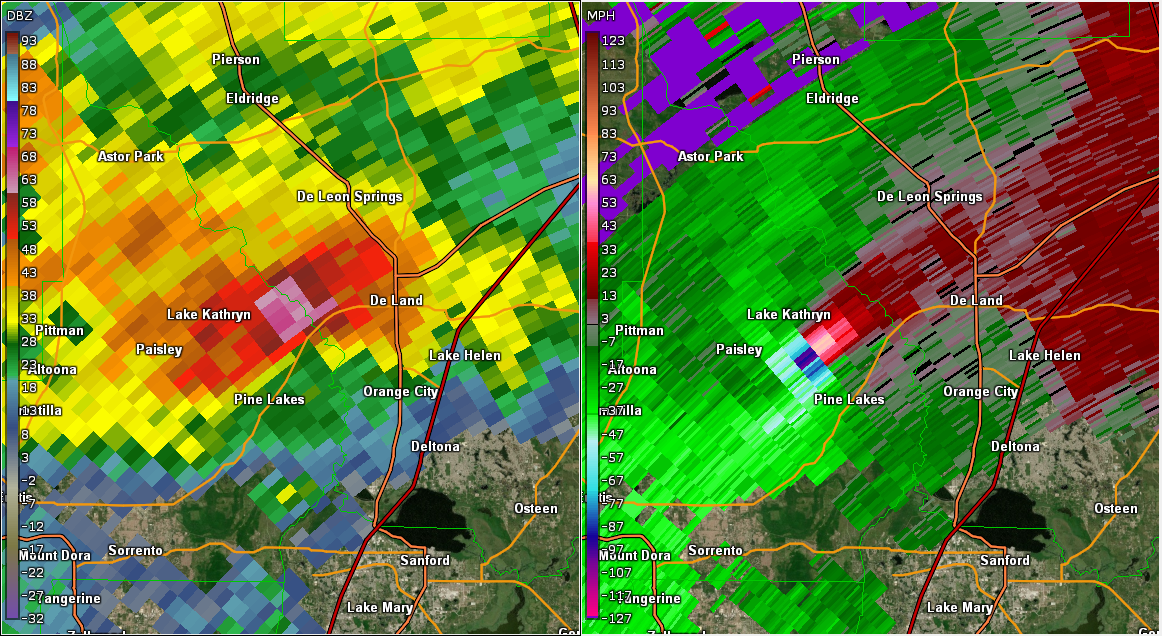
A radar image of the supercell that produced the EF3 Paisley–DeLand tornado at 3:49 am EST (08:49 UTC).

The mesocyclone that produced the first tornado restrengthened and formed another tornado near Paisley at 3:37 am EST (0837 UTC) in Lake County. A second tornado warning was issued at 3:52 am EST (0852 UTC) for Volusia County as the tornado was tracking toward the area. It went east northeast toward the Lake Mack area, exceeding 50 miles per hour (80 km/h). The tornado received an EF3 rating on the Enhanced Fujita Scale and traveled a total of 26 miles (42 km). A third tornado warning was issued in Volusia County at 4:13 am EST (0913 UTC), nearly ten minutes before the third tornado touched down. The supercell produced its last tornado east of I-95 at 4:22 am EST (0922 UTC) and dissipated five minutes later at the Intracoastal Waterway, 3 miles (4.8 km) from where it touched down. The tornado had a maximum width of 100 yards (91 m) around the time it reached peak intensity. The tornado was rated EF1 on the Enhanced Fujita Scale and traveled for 3 miles (4.8 km).

== Confirmed tornadoes ==
Confirmed tornadoes by Enhanced Fujita rating
EFU	EF0	EF1	EF2	EF3	EF4	EF5	Total
0	1	1	0	2	0	0	4

=== February 2 event ===
List of confirmed tornadoes – Friday, February 2, 2007 (Note: All dates are based on the local time zone where the tornado touched down; however, all times are in Coordinated Universal Time for consistency.)
EF#	Location	County / Parish	State	Start Coord.	Time (UTC)	Path length	Max width	Summary
EF3	E of Wildwood to E of Lady Lake	Sumter, Lake	FL	28.8815°N 82.0457°W	08:10–08:25	16.17 mi (26.02 km)	450 yd (410 m)	8 deaths – The first tornado from the main supercell began near Wildwood and moved across the south side of The Villages, where numerous frame homes were damaged or destroyed. The tornado then struck the neighboring town of Lady Lake, where numerous mobile homes were obliterated and Lady Lake Church was completely destroyed. Numerous trees were snapped and uprooted, and several greenhouses were destroyed further along the path before the tornado dissipated. 1,246 homes and mobile homes were damaged, and 301 others were destroyed. In addition to the fatalities, an additional 25 people were injured. This was the first tornado to occur after implementation of the Enhanced Fujita Scale. The tornado caused $114 million in damage.
EF3	SW of Paisley to E of DeLand	Lake, Volusia	FL	28.9588°N 81.5871°W	08:37–09:10	26.03 mi (41.89 km)	450 yd (410 m)	13 deaths – After the previous EF3 tornado had dissipated, the supercell produced a second EF3 tornado, the deadliest of the outbreak (the third deadliest tornado in Florida's history behind the Milton F3 tornado in 1962 with 17 fatalities and the Kissimmee tornado of 1998 with 25 fatalities), at 3:37 a.m. EST (08:37 UTC). The high-end EF3 tornado first touched down southwest of Paisley, snapping numerous trees and toppling a radio tower before moving east and striking Lake Mack. Numerous mobile homes and RVs were obliterated, and numerous trees were snapped and debarked, some of which had mobile home frames wrapped around them. The tornado continued east and tore through the south side of DeLand before dissipating. Numerous mobile homes, frame homes, and apartment buildings were damaged or destroyed in DeLand. In all, 421 homes and mobile homes were damaged, and 192 others were destroyed. A total of 51 people injured. Damage totaled $98 million.
EF1	New Smyrna Beach	Volusia	FL	29.0641°N 80.9890°W	09:22–09:27	3.1 mi (5.0 km)	100 yd (91 m)	Many homes sustained structural damage, mainly to roofs and chimneys. Carports, garage doors, and pool screens were damaged as well.
EF0	Frostproof	Polk	FL	27.73°N 81.53°W	13:00–13:04	0.5 mi (0.80 km)	50 yd (46 m)	A house sustained shingle loss, two sheds were blown over, and several citrus trees were downed.

== Aftermath ==
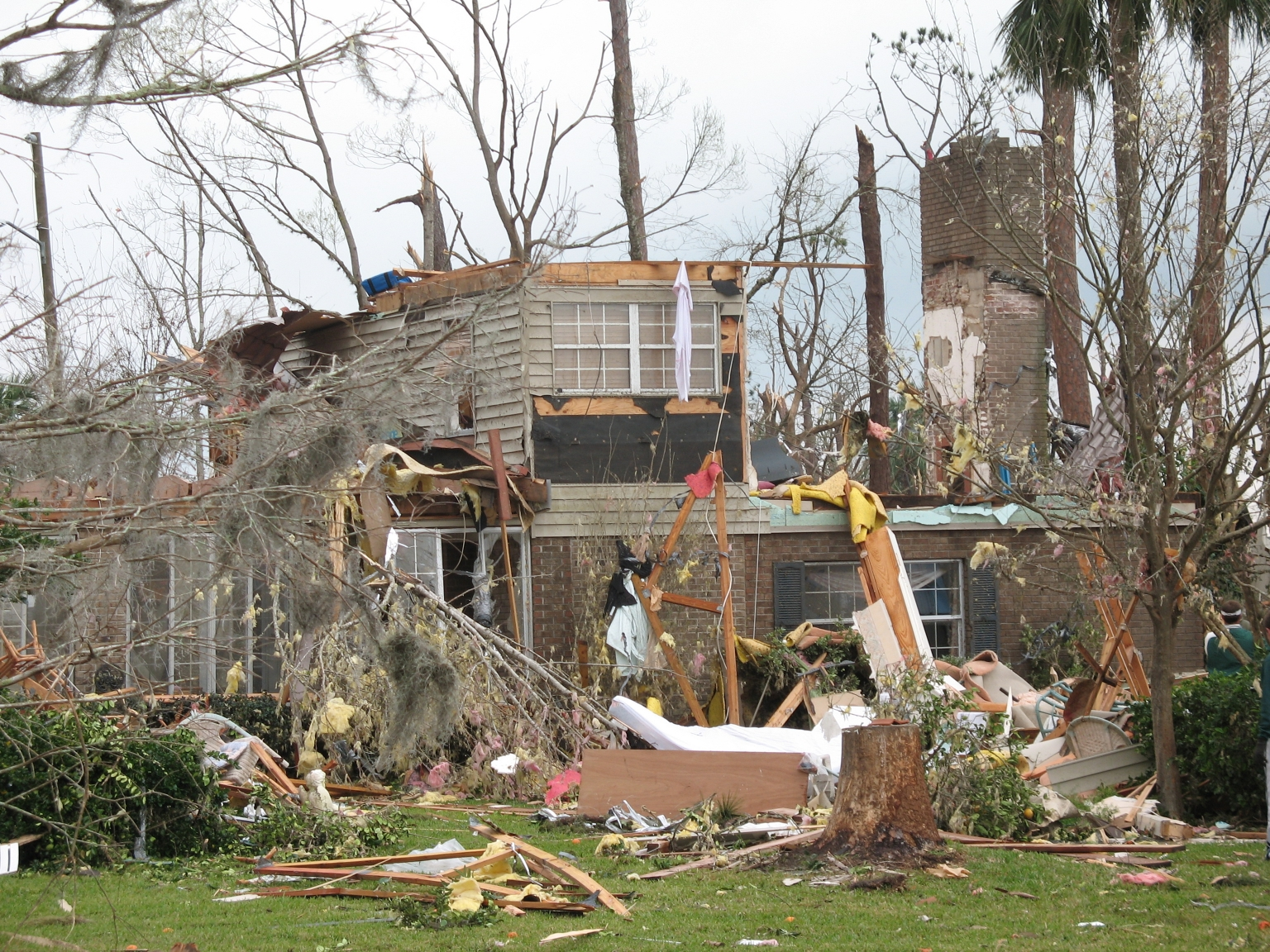
A severely damaged home in DeLand, Florida

The outbreak was the second-deadliest on record for Florida, behind one that killed 42 people in February 1998. Damages from the tornado outbreak totaled $218 million (2007 US$). Christopher Patton, spokesman for the Lake County emergency operations center, described the damage as "unlike even perhaps the hurricanes of 2004 when we had minor roof damage, screen damage, pool damage. This is way far more devastating." The tornadoes were the first to be rated on the Enhanced Fujita Scale, which replaced the original Fujita Scale.

U.S. President George W. Bush signed a declaration to designate Sumter, Lake, Volusia and Seminole counties as disaster areas. A state of emergency was declared by Governor Charlie Crist for the same counties. More than 400 American Red Cross volunteers from across several states went to help in central Florida. The Tampa Bay chapter of the American Red Cross sent six volunteers with emergency response vehicles to the main area of damage. The Walt Disney Company donated $50,000 to the American Red Cross to help aid victims and Feed The Children sent two truckloads of relief supplies to the central Florida area. The Salvation Army brought several mobile kitchens to offer relief to victims and Verizon Wireless helped by offering citizens the use of a wireless emergency communication center, in addition to cleaning and repairing cellular phones damaged by the storms. Katie Couric anchored the CBS Evening News from Lady Lake on February 2. The broadcast was slated to be from Miami, where Super Bowl XLI was held two days later as the game was to air on CBS. A moment of silence was held before Super Bowl XLI in Miami to honor the victims of the tornadoes.

== See also ==
- List of North American tornadoes and tornado outbreaks
- 1966 Tampa tornado family
