= Lake Mack-Forest Hills, Florida =

- Census-designated place
- Location in Lake County and the state of Florida
- Coordinates: 28°59′56″N 81°24′52″W
- Country: United States
- State: Florida
- County: Lake

Area
  - Total: 5.17 sq mi (13.38 km^{2})
  - Land: 4.84 sq mi (12.53 km^{2})
  - Water: 0.33 sq mi (0.85 km^{2})
- Elevation: 59 ft (18 m)

Population (2020)
  - Total: 992
  - Density: 205.1/sq mi (79.18/km^{2})
- Time zone: UTC-5 (Eastern (EST))
  - Summer (DST): UTC-4 (EDT)
- FIPS code: 12-38332
- GNIS feature ID: 2403198

Lake Mack-Forest Hills is a census-designated place (CDP) in Lake County, Florida, United States. It contains the unincorporated communities of Forest Hills and Lake Mack Park. As of the 2020 census, Lake Mack-Forest Hills had a population of 992. It is part of the Orlando–Kissimmee–Sanford Metropolitan Statistical Area.

In the early morning of February 2, 2007, a tornado touched down, destroying a large portion of the community as well as killing at least 14.

== Geography ==
Lake Mack-Forest Hills is located in northeastern Lake County. The unincorporated community of Forest Hills is in the center of the CDP, surrounding a small lake of the same name. Lake Mack Park is a smaller unincorporated community in the southwest part of the CDP, surrounding Lake Mack. The CDP is 8 miles (13 km) west of the city of DeLand.

According to the United States Census Bureau, the CDP has a total area of 5.2 square miles (13.4 km^{2}), of which 4.8 square miles (12.5 km^{2}) are land and 0.35 square miles (0.9 km^{2}), or 6.36%, are water.

== Demographics ==
Historical population
Census	Pop.	Note	%±
2020	992		—
U.S. Decennial Census

As of the census of 2000, there were 989 people, 396 households, and 266 families residing in the CDP. The population density was 208.8 inhabitants per square mile (80.6/km^{2}). There were 485 housing units at an average density of 102.4 per square mile (39.5/km^{2}). The racial makeup of the CDP was 95.05% White, 0.10% African American, 0.30% Native American, 0.61% Asian, 2.02% from other races, and 1.92% from two or more races. Hispanic or Latino of any race were 4.45% of the population.

There were 396 households, out of which 26.3% had children under the age of 18 living with them, 51.5% were married couples living together, 9.3% had a female householder with no husband present, and 32.8% were non-families. 26.0% of all households were made up of individuals, and 8.8% had someone living alone who was 65 years of age or older. The average household size was 2.50 and the average family size was 2.92.

In the CDP, the population was spread out, with 23.7% under the age of 18, 7.7% from 18 to 24, 27.2% from 25 to 44, 25.5% from 45 to 64, and 16.0% who were 65 years of age or older. The median age was 40 years. For every 100 females, there were 101.8 males. For every 100 females age 18 and over, there were 106.3 males.

The median income for a household in the CDP was $25,718, and the median income for a family was $26,058. Males had a median income of $26,406 versus $18,452 for females. The per capita income for the CDP was $12,640. About 9.3% of families and 10.3% of the population were below the poverty line, including 14.3% of those under age 18 and 4.3% of those age 65 or over.
