= Lemon Bluff, Florida =

Lemon Bluff
- Unincorporated community
- Location within Volusia County
- Coordinates: 28°50′46″N 081°06′36″W
- Country: United States
- State: Florida
- County: Volusia
- Elevation: 13 ft (4 m)
- Time zone: UTC-5 (Eastern (EST))
  - Summer (DST): UTC-4 (EDT)
- enter ZIP code: 32764
- Area code: 386
- GNIS feature ID: 285454

Lemon Bluff is an unincorporated community located in south Volusia County, Florida, United States. It is located along the St. Johns River southeast of Osteen, Florida near the Lake Monroe Conservation Area.
