= Gibsonia, Florida =

- Unincorporated community
- Location in Polk County and the state of Florida
- Coordinates: 28°6′47″N 81°58′16″W
- Country: United States
- State: Florida
- County: Polk

Area
  - Total: 3.2 sq mi (8.4 km^{2})
  - Land: 2.6 sq mi (6.7 km^{2})
  - Water: 0.66 sq mi (1.7 km^{2})
- Elevation: 171 ft (52 m)

Population (2000)
  - Total: 4,507
  - Density: 1,390/sq mi (536.5/km^{2})
- Time zone: UTC-5 (Eastern (EST))
  - Summer (DST): UTC-4 (EDT)
- ZIP code: 33805
- Area code: 863
- FIPS code: 12-25875
- GNIS feature ID: 0283059

Gibsonia is a former census-designated place (CDP) in Polk County, Florida, United States. The population was 4,507 at the 2000 census . Most of the community's core is now part of neighboring Lakeland. It is part of the Lakeland–Winter Haven Metropolitan Statistical Area.

== Geography ==
Gibsonia is located at 28°6′47″N 81°58′16″W (28.112941, -81.970987).

According to the United States Census Bureau, the CDP has a total area of 3.2 square miles (8.3 km^{2}), of which 2.6 square miles (6.7 km^{2}) is land and 0.6 square miles (1.6 km^{2}) (20.12%) is water.

== Demographics ==
Historical population
Census	Pop.	Note	%±
1980	5,011		—
1990	5,168		3.1%
2000	4,507		−12.8%

As of the census of 2000, there were 4,507 people, 1,747 households, and 1,271 families residing in the CDP. The population density was 1,748.0 inhabitants per square mile (674.9/km^{2}). There were 1,971 housing units at an average density of 764.4 per square mile (295.1/km^{2}). The racial makeup of the CDP was 92.99% White, 2.66% African American, 0.36% Native American, 0.75% Asian, 0.13% Pacific Islander, 1.35% from other races, and 1.75% from two or more races. Hispanic or Latino of any race were 6.59% of the population.

There were 1,747 households, out of which 30.5% had children under the age of 18 living with them, 56.4% were married couples living together, 12.1% had a female householder with no husband present, and 27.2% were non-families. 22.6% of all households were made up of individuals, and 10.4% had someone living alone who was 65 years of age or older. The average household size was 2.56 and the average family size was 2.99.

In the CDP, the population was spread out, with 24.3% under the age of 18, 8.2% from 18 to 24, 26.2% from 25 to 44, 25.0% from 45 to 64, and 16.3% who were 65 years of age or older. The median age was 39 years. For every 100 females, there were 96.0 males. For every 100 females age 18 and over, there were 90.4 males.

The median income for a household in the CDP was $39,010, and the median income for a family was $44,405. Males had a median income of $30,015 versus $22,454 for females. The per capita income for the CDP was $17,010. About 7.2% of families and 10.6% of the population were below the poverty line, including 16.2% of those under age 18 and 9.3% of those age 65 or over.
