= Tornado outbreak of March 30–31, 1962 =

1962 Tornado outbreak

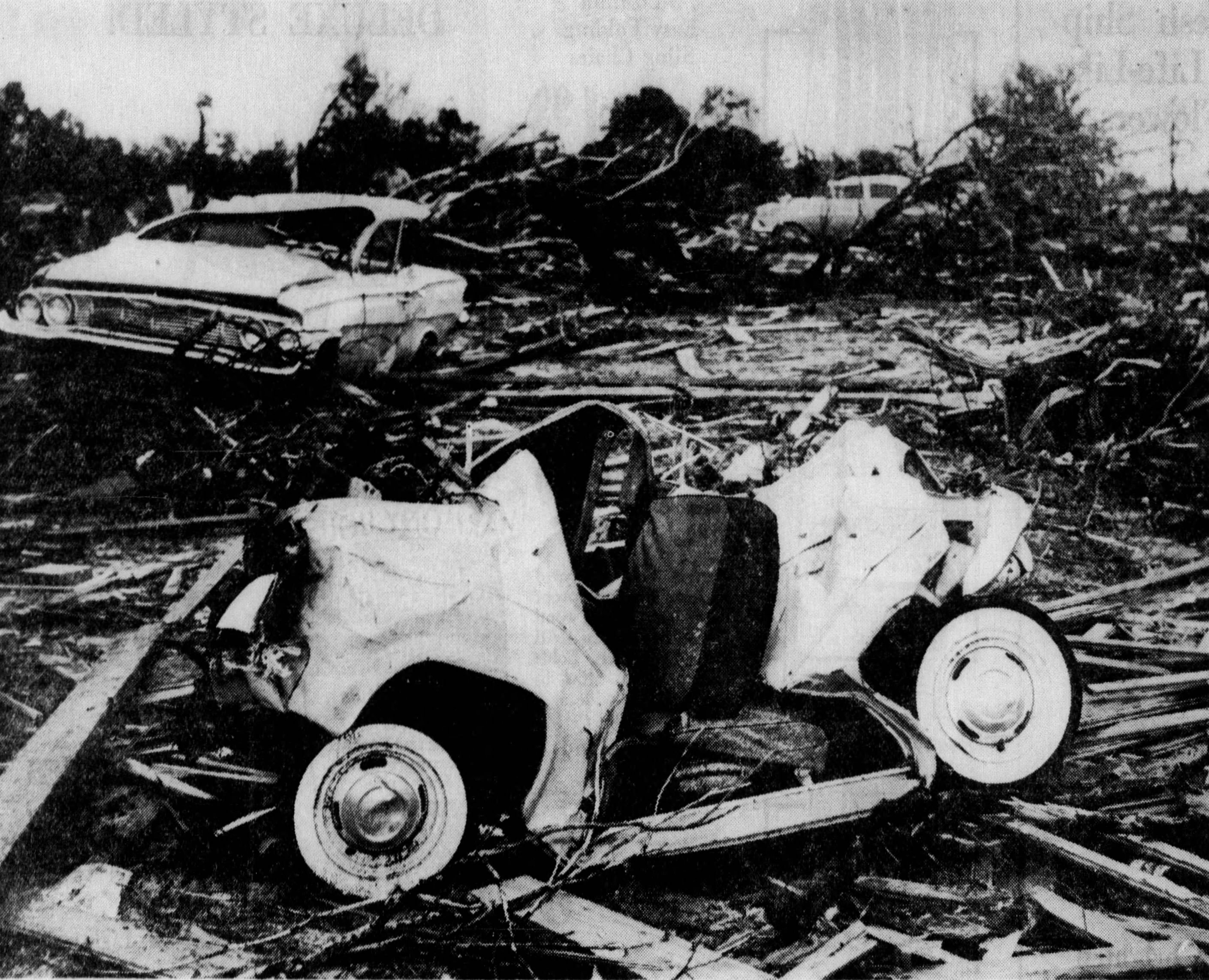
- A mangled vehicle after being struck by the Milton F3 tornado

Tornado outbreak
- Tornadoes: 11
- Max. rating: F3 tornado
- Duration: ~15 hours
- Highest winds: 79 miles per hour (127 km/h)
- Largest hail: 2 inches (5.1 cm)

Overall effects
- Fatalities: 17 (+2 non-tornadic)
- Injuries: 105 (+3 non-tornadic)
- Damage: $3.38 million
- Areas affected: Southeastern United States
- Part of the tornado outbreaks of 1962

A small but damaging outbreak of 11 tornadoes impacted the Southeastern United States on the last two days of March 1962. The outbreak was highlighted by a catastrophic, mid-morning F3 tornado that destroyed multiple neighborhoods in Milton, Florida, killing 17 people and injuring 100 others. It was the deadliest tornado ever recorded in Florida until 1998. Overall, the outbreak killed 17 people, injured 105 others, and caused $3.38 million in damage. Lightning caused another two deaths and three injuries.

== Background ==
Multiple rounds of severe thunderstorms struck the Southeast during the final two days of March, bringing heavy rain, flash flooding, frequent lightning, high winds, hail, and tornadoes to the region. Individual storms moved through portions of the region before a large line of storms pushed through.

In the Milton, Florida area specifically, the high temperature on March 30 was 77 °F (25 °C) which was coupled with a dewpoint of 65 °F (18 °C). The temperature decreased to 65 °F (18 °C) that night, but the dewpoint continued to hover around 65 °F (18 °C) and then both temperature and dewpoint rose to around 69 °F (21 °C), making it a muggy night. Increasing southerly winds brought moist, unstable air from the Gulf of Mexico northward into the region. Despite overcast skies being over the area since early on March 30 and scattered storms passing over the region just after midnight on March 31, the moist and unstable environment remained in place until much stronger storms entered the area later that morning. Even with the volatile atmospheric conditions, weather forecasters only called for scattered showers for the area on March 31.

== Confirmed tornadoes ==
Confirmed tornadoes by Fujita rating
FU	F0	F1	F2	F3	F4	F5	Total
0	0	7	2	2	0	0	11

=== March 30 event ===
List of confirmed tornadoes – Friday, March 30, 1962 (Note: All dates are based on the local time zone where the tornado touched down; however, all times are in Coordinated Universal Time and dates are split at midnight CST/CDT for consistency.) (Note: Prior to 1994, only the average widths of tornado paths were officially listed.)
F#	Location	County / Parish	State	Start coord.	Time (UTC)	Path length	Max. width	Summary
F1	Littleville	Colbert	AL	34.60°N 87.68°W	05:00–?	0.1 miles (0.16 km)	10 yards (9.1 m)	A tornado accompanied by 1 in (2.5 cm) hail destroyed several farm buildings, unroofed three homes, and moved another home off its foundation. Damage was estimated at $25,000.

=== March 31 event ===
List of confirmed tornadoes – Saturday, March 31, 1962
F#	Location	County / Parish	State	Start coord.	Time (UTC)	Path length	Max. width	Summary
F3	N of New Hope to E of Columbus	Lowndes	MS	33.47°N 88.30°W	06:15–?	3 miles (4.8 km)	880 yards (800 m)	A skipping tornado touched down three times, causing major damage west of McCrary. Two homes were destroyed while eight others, along with a church, were damaged. One person was injured and damage was estimated at $250,000.
F2	N of Belk	Fayette	AL	33.70°N 87.90°W	08:00–?	0.1 miles (0.16 km)	10 yards (9.1 m)	A brief but strong tornado destroyed a concrete block barn, heavily damaged a house, and unroofed another barn. Damage was estimated at $25,000.
F1	SE of Winfield	Marion	AL	33.90°N 87.80°W	08:10–?	1 mile (1.6 km)	10 yards (9.1 m)	A damaging tornado moved through the eastern outskirts of Winfield. Several houses and a church were damaged, garages and outbuildings were blown over, a car was overturned, and trees were uprooted. Damage was estimated at $250,000.
F1	Chef Menteur	Orleans	LA	30.10°N 89.75°W	13:00–13:14	1 mile (1.6 km)	30 yards (27 m)	A tornado developed near Lake St. Catherine, destroying a shed. Winds from the tornado were recorded at 65 miles per hour (105 km/h). Damage was estimated $2,500.
F3	Milton	Santa Rosa	FL	30.62°N 87.10°W	14:00–?	6.9 miles (11.1 km)	440 yards (400 m)	17 deaths – See section on this tornado – 100 people were injured and damage was estimated at $2.5 million.
F2	Bon Secour to Miflin to SW of Lillian	Baldwin	AL	30.3°N 87.7°W	14:00–?	11.9 miles (19.2 km)	100 yards (91 m)	A strong tornado struck Bon Secour, where homes were heavily damaged and trees were uprooted. It continued eastward to Miflin, where more homes and buildings were damaged or destroyed. Damage was estimated at $250,000.
F1	N of Bellview	Escambia	FL	30.5°N 87.33°W	15:30–?	0.1 miles (0.16 km)	10 yards (9.1 m)	A trailer was destroyed while another residence was damaged. Two people were injured and damage was estimated at $2,500.
F1	Valpariso to Niceville	Okaloosa	FL	30.5°N 86.5°W	16:20–?	0.1 miles (0.16 km)	10 yards (9.1 m)	A destructive tornado inflicted major damage to six residences and two businesses and caused less severe damage to 12 additional residences. Two people were injured and damage was estimated at $25,000.
F1	Tifton to Douglas to Nicholls to Alma	Tift, Berrien, Coffee, Bacon	GA	31.45°N 83.5°W	17:30–?	61.2 miles (98.5 km)	200 yards (180 m)	This long-tracked tornado, which may have been a tornado family, caused most of its damage in Tifton, although damage from the storm was reported as far back as Doerun. Several homes were unroofed, trees were uprooted, and power lines were blown down on the southeast side of Tifton. The funnel cloud from the tornado was seen by a pilot in Alma as well, but no damage was reported there. Damage was estimated at $25,000.
F1	West Panama City Beach to Youngstown	Bay	FL	30.18°N 85.73°W	20:00–?	0.1 miles (0.16 km)	10 yards (9.1 m)	A tornado was spotted by the highway patrol. Several residences and a motel suffered major damage in West Panama City Beach. The tornado lifted after that, only to touch down again and cause minor damage in Youngstown. Damage was estimated at $25,000.

=== Milton, Florida ===
Milton, Florida
F3 tornado
- on the Fujita scale

Overall effects
- Fatalities: 17
- Injuries: 100
- Damage: $2.5 million

In the far northeastern suburbs of Pensacola, Florida, a tornado developed south of Hamilton Bridge Road west of Milton, shortly after 9 am CST on March 31. It then grew into a large, destructive tornado as it moved northeastward through the northwest side of town. It struck multiple neighborhoods with little to no warning, heavily damaging or destroying dozens of frame homes. The hardest-hit area was the College Park residential area, where several homes were completely leveled with some swept away while other homes were extensively damaged. In an extreme case, one home was swept off its foundation while the neighboring home was lifted off its foundation and set back down on the empty slab of the swept away home. At the corner of Magnolia and Orange St, a man's car stalled right in the path of the tornado. He and his car was carried two blocks to Stewart St, where it landed essentially intact. A 350 ft (110 m) microwave tower was blown over and a number of high-voltage power lines were knocked down. Trailers and cars were also thrown several hundred feet. After exiting Milton, the tornado continued northeastward, uprooting trees and damaging other isolated structures before dissipating on Munson Highway north of its intersection with Wolfe Road just southwest of Roeville. It traveled 6.9 miles (11.1 km) and reached a peak width of 440 yards (400 m). When the Fujita Scale was made operational in the 1970s, the damage from the tornado was rated F2-F3, giving the tornado a final maximum rating F3. In all, a total of 130 homes, including 75 small homes, were destroyed along a six-block area. About 200 other homes and buildings were damaged. Extensive damage also occurred at a mobile home park. Debris was carried east-northeast to as far away as areas north of Baker 26 mi (42 km) away while other debris was carried northeast to Andalusia, Alabama 58 mi (93 km) away. There were 17 deaths, including five out of six members of one family, as well as a mother and three young children that were killed in their home. At least 10 homes had a single death. An additional 100 people were injured, about 80 of which required treatment. This made it the deadliest tornado ever recorded in Florida until 1998 as well the worst tornado ever recorded in Santa Rosa County. The storm that produced the tornado may have also caused a lightning-induced injury in Crestview, Florida, two hours later.

== Non-tornadic impacts ==
There were 13 reports of high winds and large hail during the events. Hail peaked at 2 inches (5.1 cm) in diameter in De Soto County, Mississippi, with winds peaking at 79 miles per hour (127 km/h) at the Sunny Point Military Ocean Terminal east of Boiling Spring Lakes, North Carolina. Both events occurred on March 31.

Early on March 30, a lightning strike sparked a large fire at a horse stable in Kingston, Oklahoma, although no casualties occurred. That evening, two students were struck by lightning while walking on the Emory University campus, killing one and injuring the other. Early the next morning, a woman was knocked unconscious and injured in Decatur, Tennessee, after lightning traveled from outside her farmhouse into her kitchen through the water pipes, sparking a fire. Later, another man was killed in Lee County, Alabama, when the power line he was working on was struck by lightning. One other person was injured by lightning in Crestview, Florida.

Rounds of storms caused widespread hail and wind damage in Central Alabama on March 30. The Birmingham Municipal Airport was particularly hard-hit as winds of up to 60 miles per hour (97 km/h) and hail up to 1.5 inches (3.8 cm) in diameter damaged around 60 planes. Albertville was buried under 2 inches (5.1 cm) of marble-sized hail. The small hail caused an unusually high amount of destruction as it damaged roofs, broke windows, and heavily damaged a greenhouse, trees, and shrubs. Early the next morning, a line of storms caused heavy wind damage in Port Arthur, Texas. This same line moved into Southeastern Alabama, producing high winds, heavy rainfall that peaked at 5 inches (13 cm), and flash flooding that damaged several homes, farm buildings, two airplanes, roads, and newly planted crops.

== Aftermath and records ==
The Florida Highway Patrol, who were some of the first on the scene in Milton, Florida after the F3 tornado, provided early estimates of 75 homes being destroyed, with varying degrees of damage to many others. They also estimated that 75 to 100 people had been injured. At the time of the tornado, the town of Milton had only about 4,000 residents (as of 2020 it has an estimated population of over 10,000 residents) and one 50-bed hospital – Santa Rosa Hospital, which was quickly overwhelmed after the storm. A total 52 people were treated and released from Santa Rosa Hospital. Some of the most seriously injured victims were eventually sent to Escambia General Baptist Hospital and Sacred Heart N.A.S. Pensacola in Pensacola, Florida. Meanwhile, a temporary makeshift morgue was made in the core of Milton as highway patrolmen, civil defense workers, and volunteers sifted through collapsed buildings in search of survivors and bodies. Many telephone lines were damaged and the few that were remaining were completely overwhelmed by long-distance calls.

The 17 deaths caused by the F3 tornado made it the deadliest tornado of 1962 as well as the deadliest tornado ever recorded in Florida until 1998, when another F3 (initially rated F4) tornado killed 25.

== See also ==
- List of North American tornadoes and tornado outbreaks
- Tornado outbreak of February 23–24, 2016
