= Weather and Forecasting =

- Discipline: Meteorology
- Language: English
- Edited by: Karen Kosiba

Publication details
- History: 1986–present
- Publisher: American Meteorological Society (United States)
- Frequency: Bimonthly
- Open access: Delayed, 1 year
- Impact factor: 2.8 (2025)

Standard abbreviations
- ISO 4: Weather Forecast.

Indexing
- ISSN: 0882-8156 (print); 1520-0434 (web)

Links
- Journal homepage; Archive

Weather and Forecasting is a scientific journal published by the American Meteorological Society. It includes articles on forecasting and analysis techniques, forecast verification studies, and case studies useful to forecasters. Common topics include reports on changes to the suite of operational numerical models and statistical post-processing techniques and articles that demonstrate the transfer of research results to the forecasting community.

== See also ==
- List of scientific journals
  - List of scientific journals in earth and atmospheric sciences
