= Harold E. Brooks =

American meteorologist (born 1959)

Harold Brooks
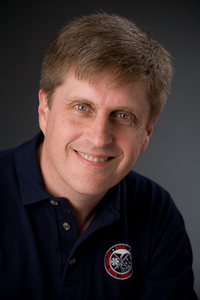
- Born: March 11, 1959 (age 67); St. Louis, Missouri, US
- Education: Wolfson College, Cambridge; William Jewell College (B.A., 1982); Columbia University (M.A., M.Phil., 1982); University of Illinois at Urbana-Champaign (Ph.D., 1990)
- Known for: Severe convective storms, tornado climatology, weather forecasting
- Scientific career
- Fields: Meteorology
- Workplaces: National Severe Storms Laboratory; University of Oklahoma
- Thesis: Low-level Curvature Shear and Supercell Thunderstorm Behavior (1990)
- Doctoral advisor: Robert B. Wilhelmson

Harold Edward Brooks (born March 11, 1959) is an American meteorologist whose research is concentrated on severe convective storms and tornadoes, particularly severe weather climatology, as well as weather forecasting.

== Life and work ==
Brooks began his higher education career at William Jewell College, studying physics and mathematics, achieving a B.A., summa cum laude, in 1982. While there he studied abroad at Wolfson College, Cambridge, passing Part 1 of the tripos in Archaeology and Anthropology in 1980. In 1985 he earned a M.A. and M.Phil. at Columbia University from the Atmospheric Sciences Program within the Department of Geological Sciences. This was followed by doctoral studies at the University of Illinois at Urbana-Champaign, culminating in a Ph.D. in atmospheric sciences in 1990. During this period Brooks worked as a laboratory assistant, graduate assistant, rapporteur, and graduate research assistant. Brooks is a member of Sigma Xi.

Brooks joined the National Severe Storms Laboratory (NSSL) as a research meteorologist in 1991. Elected as a Fellow of the American Meteorological Society (AMS) in 2010 and a Fellow of the Royal Meteorological Society (RMetS) in 1996, Brooks has received the Department of Commerce Silver Medal in 2002, three NOAA Research Outstanding Paper Awards, and the NOAA Administrator's Award in 2007. He was a contributor to the Physical Science Basis portion of the Fourth Assessment Report of the IPCC, an organization that was co-awarded the 2007 Nobel Peace Prize.
