= Tornado climatology =

Climate factors contributing to the formation of tornadoes

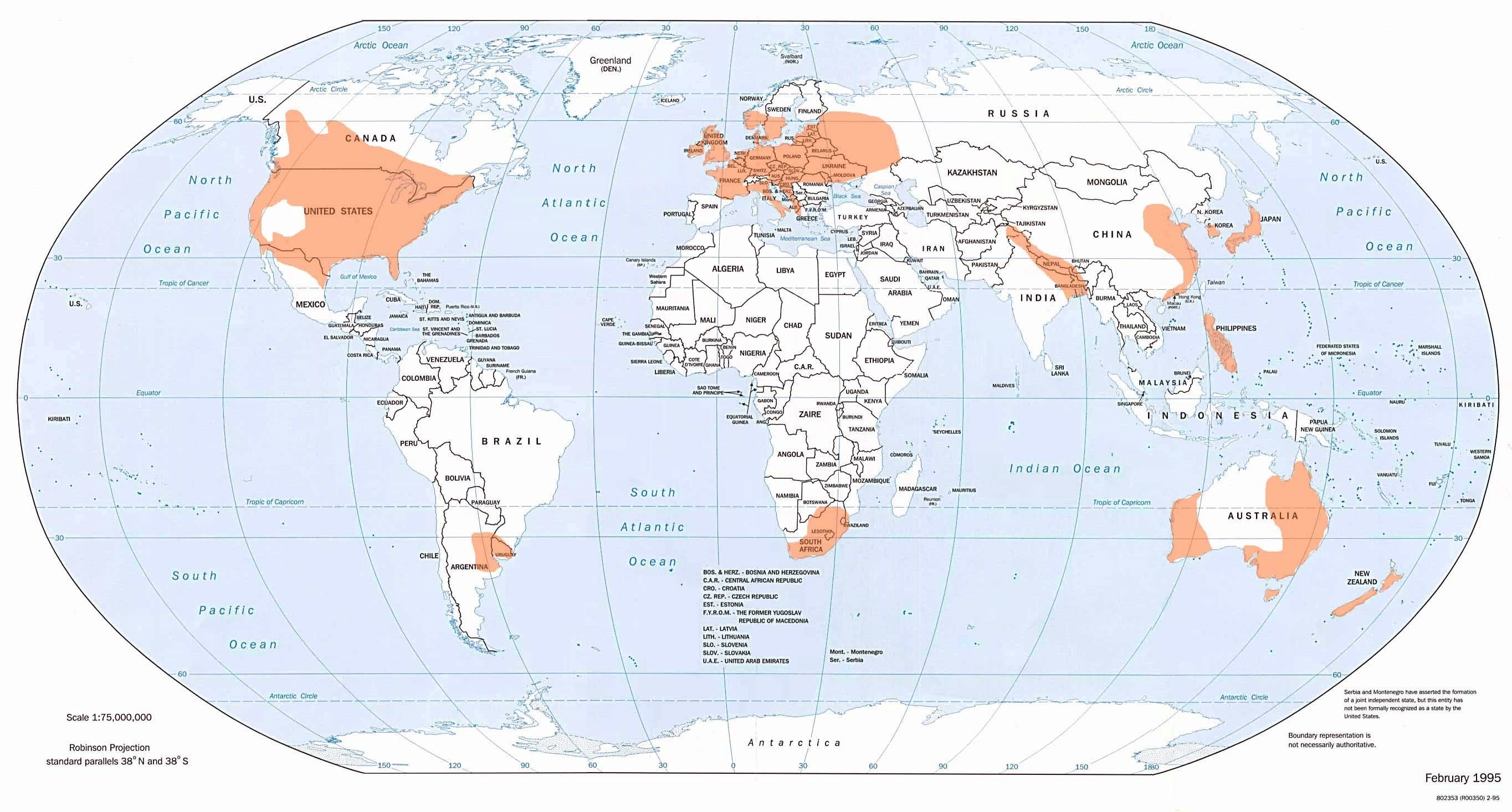
Areas worldwide with the highest frequency of tornadoes are indicated by orange shading.

Tornadoes have been recorded on all continents except Antarctica. They are most common in the middle latitudes where conditions are often favorable for convective storm development. The United States has the most tornadoes of any country, as well as the strongest and most violent tornadoes. A large portion of these tornadoes form in an area of the central United States popularly known as Tornado Alley. Canada experiences the second most tornadoes. Ontario and the Prairie Provinces see the highest frequency. Other areas of the world that have frequent tornadoes include significant portions of Europe, South Africa, Philippines, Bangladesh, parts of Argentina, Uruguay, southern and southeastern Brazil, northern Mexico, eastern and western Australia, New Zealand, and far eastern Asia.

Tornado reports in the U.S. have been officially collated since 1950. These reports have been gathered by the National Climatic Data Center (NCDC), based in Asheville, North Carolina. A tornado can be reported more than once, such as when a storm crosses a county line and reports are made from two counties. The severity of tornadoes is measured by the Enhanced Fujita Scale, which measures tornado intensity on a scale of EF0 to EF5 based on degree of destruction. The ratings are made after the tornado has dissipated and the damage trail is carefully studied by weather professionals. A series of continuous tornado outbreaks is known as a tornado outbreak sequence.

== Necessary conditions ==
Not every thunderstorm, supercell, squall line, or tropical cyclone will produce a tornado. The precisely right atmospheric conditions are required for the formation of even a weak tornado. Tornadoes can form in any month when conditions are favorable. (Note: For example, a freak tornadoes hit South St. Louis County Missouri on 31 December 2010, causing pockets of heavy damage to a modest area before dissipating—the temperature was unseasonably warm that day—and the EF-4 that completely leveled the town of Mayfield, Kentucky on 10 December 2021, and was from a long-lived supercell that produced two long-track EF-4 tornadoes.) 1,000 or more tornadoes a year are reported in the contiguous United States. The high frequency of tornadoes in North America is largely due to geography, as moisture from the Gulf of Mexico is easily advected into the midcontinent with few topographic barriers in the way. The Rocky Mountains block Pacific-sourced moisture and buckle the atmospheric flow, forcing the drier air to mid-levels of the troposphere. (Note: The dry air is pushed up to non-usual levels, due to the downsloping winds coming off the Rockies. This causes cyclogenesis downstream to the east of the mountains, where supercell storms will develop.) Downsloping winds off the Rockies force the formation of a dry line when the flow aloft is strong, while the Gulf of Mexico fuels abundant low-level moisture. This unique topography allows for frequent collisions of warm and cold air, the conditions that breed strong, long-lived storms throughout the year. This area extends into Canada, particularly Ontario and the Prairie Provinces. Tornadoes can also be triggered by hurricanes, although the tornadoes caused by hurricanes are often much weaker and harder to spot. Winter is the least common time for tornadoes to occur, since hurricane activity is virtually non-existent at this time, and it is more difficult for warm, moist maritime tropical air to take over the frigid Arctic air from Canada. Winter tornado occurrences are found mostly in the Gulf states (although there have been some notable exceptions).

South America's tornado corridor region is favorable for tornadoes and severe thunderstorms due to the large size of the Pampas Plain where the cold, dry air from Patagonia, the Andes, and Antarctica collides with warm, moist air from areas of Brazil, northern Argentina, and Paraguay.

Europe has some small "tornado alleys"—probably because of frontal collisions as in the south and east of England, but also because Europe is partitioned by mountain ranges such as the Alps. The Po Valley (Pianura Padana) is one of the areas that experiences more tornado activity than elsewhere on the European continent. Located in the heart of Europe, between the Alps and the Apennines, the collision between cold and warm air here during the summer months easily permits the growth of very strong thunderstorms. The most frequent tornadoes occur in the eastern section of the Po Plains. Parts of Styria (Steiermark) in Austria may be a tornado alley, and this state has had at least three F3 tornadoes since 1900. F3 and perhaps one F4 tornado have also occurred as far north as Finland.

== Geographical occurrences ==
The United States has by far the most tornadoes of any country. Many of these form in an area of the central (Note: Some definitions include the southern U.S.) United States known as Tornado Alley. This area extends into Canada, particularly the prairie provinces and Ontario. Activity in Canada, however, is less frequent and intense than that of the US. Strong tornadoes occur in northern Mexico. A large region of South America is also characterized by storms that reach the level of supercells and produce intense hailstorms, floods, and tornadoes during the spring, summer, and early fall. The region recently dubbed as the Tornado Corridor (South America) is considered the second largest in the world in terms of the formation of extreme weather events. It covers most of central Argentina, southern Paraguay, southeastern Brazil, and Uruguay.

Other areas of the world that have relatively frequent tornadoes include Germany, the Czech Republic, Slovakia, Italy, China, and the Philippines. Australia, France, Russia, areas of the Middle East, and Japan have a history of multiple damaging tornado events. Bangladesh and surrounding areas of eastern India suffer from a couple tornadoes annually of similar severity to stronger tornadoes in the US. These occur with a greater recurrence interval but over a smaller region. The annual human death toll from tornadoes in Bangladesh is estimated at 179 deaths per year, which is much greater than in the US. This is likely due to the density of population; poor quality of construction; lack of tornado safety knowledge; and lack of warnings—among other factors.

=== Number of tornadoes by region ===
Various government agencies and published academic studies have kept track of the number of tornadoes based on geographic region.

Region	Study conducted by	Years of study	# of tornadoes	Ref.
Europe	European Severe Storms Laboratory; German Aerospace Center; Karlsruhe Institute of Technology; Max Planck Institute for Nuclear Physics; ORF Austrian Broadcasting Corporation	1966–2021	17,874	
Chile	University of Chile; University of O'Higgins; Center for Climate and Resilience Research; Dirección Meteorológica de Chile; CEILAP; UNIDEF	1633–2022	51	
United States	Thomas P. Grazulis	1680–1949	7,082	
Australia	Bureau of Meteorology	1795–2019	1,326	
Bengal	Cooperative Institute for Research in the Atmosphere; Colorado State University; National Weather Service; ENSCO, Inc.	1838–2003	87	
Argentina	University of Buenos Aires	1889–2017	330	
South Africa	Z. Muller with AfriWX	1907–2022	325	
New Zealand	National Institute of Water and Atmospheric Research	1908–2019	107	
Brazil	State University of Ponta Grossa	1975–2018	581	
United States	Storm Prediction Center	1950–2022	65,057	
United States	National Centers for Environmental Information	1950–2022	66,178	
Bengal	Bangladesh University of Engineering and Technology	1964–2013	25	
United States	National Weather Service	1965–2022	6,874	
Canada	Environment and Climate Change Canada	1980–2009	1,834	
China	Tongji University	2003–2019	734	
Mexico	National Autonomous University of Mexico; Autonomous University of Zacatecas; Instituto Potosino de Investigación Científica y Tecnológica	2007–2020	350	
Japan	Japan Meteorological Agency	2007–2020	531	
China	Peking University	2007–2016	983	
Canada	Northern Tornadoes Project, Western University	2017–2021	375	
Brazil	PREVOTS	2018–2025	524	

== By area ==
=== Africa ===
Tornadoes do occur in extreme southern Africa (including the countries of South Africa, Lesotho, and Eswatini). In October 2011, two people were killed and nearly 200 were injured after a tornado formed, near Ficksburg in the Free State; more than 1,000 shacks and houses were flattened. There is also the seasonal incidence of tornadoes in the coast of Western Africa. These occur during the onset of the rainy season when tumultuous winds accompanied by sheets of rain as well as spectacular thunder and lightning batter the coast. The tornado generating storms were often welcomed by colonial settlers in the region since they dissipated extreme heat and humidity during the last days of the dry season. Tornadoes are often embedded in the African squall lines, but they damage crops, and diminish any beneficial effect of its rains.

=== Asia ===
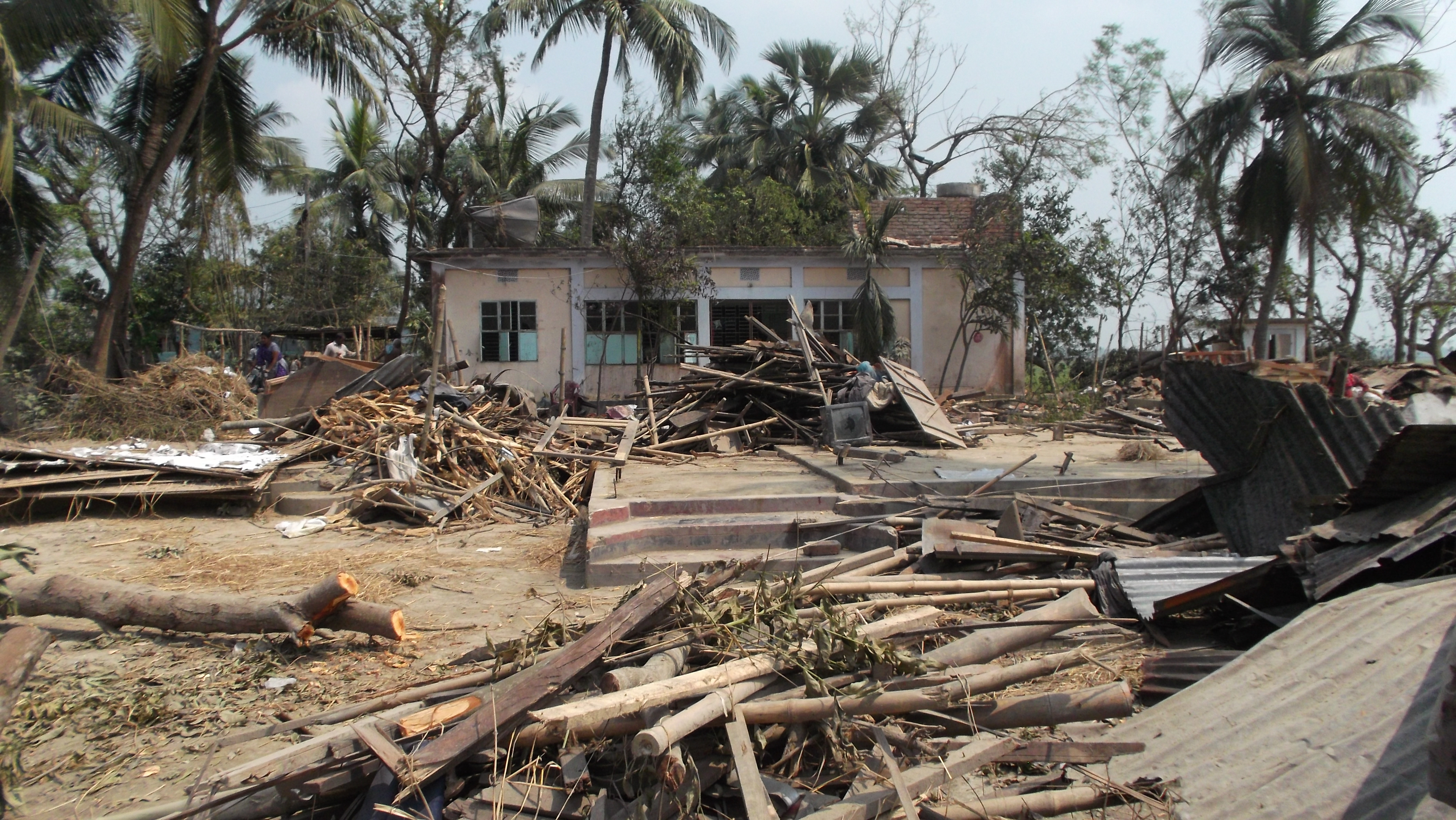
Tornado damage in Bangladesh

Bangladesh and the eastern parts of India are very exposed to destructive tornadoes. Bangladesh, the Philippines, and Japan have the highest number of reported tornadoes in Asia. The single deadliest tornado ever recorded struck the Manikganj District of Bangladesh on 26 April 1989, killing an estimated 1,300 people, injuring 12,000, and leaving approximately 80,000 people homeless. Five other recorded tornadic events have killed more than 500 people in Bangladesh, most recently on 13 May 1996 when a tornado swept through the Jamalpur and Tangail districts, killing more than 600.

China occasionally experiences destructive tornadoes. Storms producing multiple tornadoes and hail struck a densely populated area of farms and factories near the city of Yancheng in Jiangsu province, about 800 kilometers (500 miles) south of Beijing, China. Throughout China, an estimated 100 tornadoes may occur per year with a few exceeding F2 in intensity, with activity most prevalent in eastern regions. During the period of 1948 until 2013, 4763 tornadoes were confirmed in China.

=== Europe ===
The UK has the most annual tornadoes per land area per year, at 0.14 per 1000 km^{2} (although these tornadoes are generally weak). Other European countries have a similar number of tornadoes per area. One notable tornado of recent years was the tornado that struck Birmingham, United Kingdom, in July 2005. A row of houses was destroyed, but no one was killed.

Europe as a whole has about 180 tornadoes per year. They are most common from June to August, especially in Central Europe and the Po Valley of Italy, and rarest from January to March. Strong tornadoes (F2, F3) do occur, but violent tornadoes (F4, F5) are quite rare - return rates for F4 events are a decade or more across the continent, and there has been no officially recorded F5s for the contemporary period in Europe. As in the US, tornadoes are far from evenly distributed. Since 1900, deadly tornadoes have occurred in Austria, Belgium, Cyprus, Czech Republic, Finland, France, Germany, Italy, Lithuania, Estonia, Malta, the Netherlands, Poland, Ukraine, Portugal, Romania, Russia, and the UK. The 1984 Ivanovo–Yaroslavl outbreak, with more than 400 fatalities and 213 injured, was the 20th century's deadliest tornado outbreak in Europe. It included at least two tornadoes with a rating of F4. (Note: Possibly Europe's deadliest tornado hit Malta in 1551 (or 1556) and killed about 600.)

=== North America ===
Canada's only confirmed F5 tornado occurred in Elie, Manitoba, on June 22, 2007.

==== Canada ====
Canada annually experiences numerous tornadoes, although fewer than the United States. On average 62 are reported per year, but this number is expected to in fact be higher due to undetected tornadoes in large expanses of underpopulated areas. NOAA records a higher average of 100 per year in Canada. These storms cause tens of millions of dollars in damage. Most are weak F0 or F1 in intensity, but there are on average a few F2 or stronger that touch down each season.

For example, the tornado frequency of Southwestern Ontario is about half that of the most tornado-prone areas of the central US plains. The last multiple tornado-related deaths in Canada were caused by a tornado in Ear Falls, Ontario on 9 July 2009, where 3 died, and the last killer tornado was on 21 June 2021 in Mascouche, Quebec. The two deadliest tornadoes on Canadian soil were the Regina Cyclone of 30 June 1912 (28 fatalities) and the Edmonton Tornado of 31 July 1987 (27 fatalities). Both of these storms were rated an F4 on the Fujita scale. The city of Windsor was struck by strong tornadoes four times over 61 years (1946, 1953, 1974, 1997) ranging in strength from an F2 to F4. Canada's first official F5 tornado struck Elie, Manitoba on 22 June 2007. Tornadoes are most frequent in the provinces of Alberta, Saskatchewan, Manitoba, and Ontario.

==== United States ====
Average annual tornado reports in the United States

The United States averaged 1,274 tornadoes per year from 2001 to 2011. April 2011 saw the most tornadoes recorded to date for any month in the US National Weather Service's history: 875. (Note: Prior to 2022, the previous U.S. regional record for most tornadoes in one month was 542.) It has more tornadoes yearly than any other country, and reports far more violent F4 and F5 tornadoes than anywhere else. The most extreme tornadic phenomena (as in the occurrence of EF5-strength tornadoes, width, track and measured wind speed records, the occurrence of phenomena like twin tornadoes and particularly large and intense outbreaks) are almost exclusive to the United States.

Tornadoes are common in many states but are most common to the west of the Appalachian Mountains and to the east of the Rockies. The Atlantic seaboard states: North Carolina, South Carolina, Georgia and Virginia, are also vulnerable, as well as Florida, though most Florida tornadoes are relatively weak, usually EF0 or EF1. The southern states are also highly impacted, in terms of casualties. More tornadoes occur in Texas than in any other US state, (Note: This is due to Texas' large size, its location on the southern end of Tornado Alley, and the occurrence of tropical cyclone-related tornadoes.) but the state that has the highest number of tornadoes per area is Florida. Tornadoes often occur along the edges of the hurricanes that strike the state. The state with the highest number of strong tornadoes per area is Oklahoma, while the neighboring state of Kansas records the most EF4 and EF5 tornadoes in the country.

Tornadoes can occur west of the continental divide, but they are infrequent and usually relatively weak and short-lived. Recently, tornadoes have struck along the Pacific coast towns of Lincoln City, Oregon (1996); Sunnyvale, California (1998); Port Orchard, Washington (2018); and downtown Salt Lake City, Utah (1999). (Note: See Salt Lake City Tornado) The California Central Valley is an area of some frequency for tornadoes, albeit of very weak intensity.

The deadliest U.S. tornado recorded is the Tri-State tornado of March 18, 1925 that swept across southeastern Missouri, southern Illinois, and southern Indiana, killing 695 people. The biggest tornado outbreak on record—with 353 tornadoes for just 3 1/2 days (including four EF5 and eleven EF4 tornadoes)—occurred starting on 25 April 2011 and intensifying on April, 26, and 27 (a record-breaking day), before ending on 28 April 2011, now referred to as the 2011 Super Outbreak. (Note: Previously, the record was 148 tornadoes in an outbreak that was dubbed the 1974 Super Outbreak.) A similar outbreak was seen in 1974.

=== South America ===
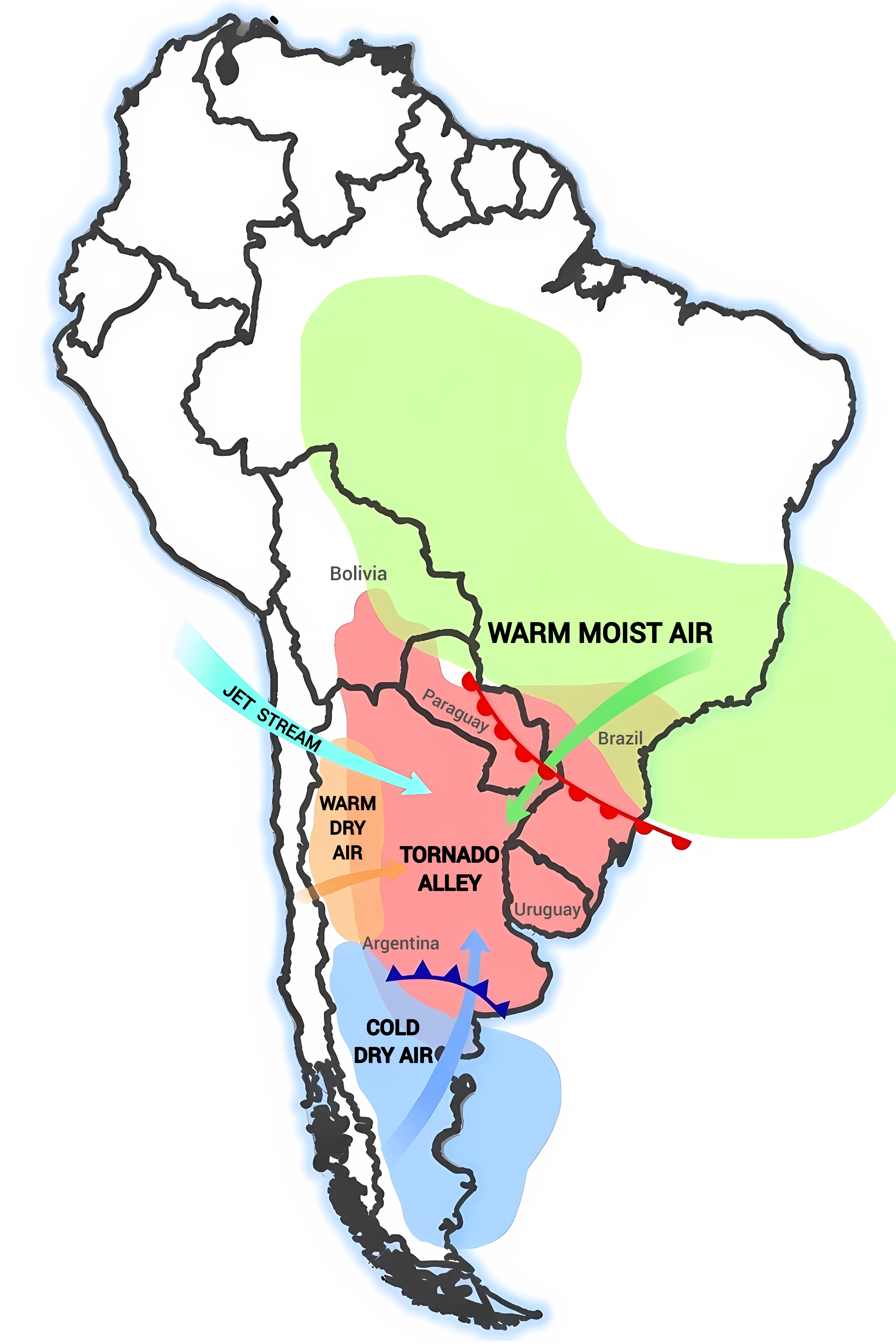
Diagram explaining the weather systems that contribute to increased tornado frequency in South America's Tornado Alley (in red)

Argentina, southern and southeast Brazil, Uruguay, and part of Paraguay are the most tornado-prone areas in South America. Argentina has many areas with high tornadic activity, and also one of the most intense tornadoes in the Southern Hemisphere, such as the F5 in San Justo, Argentina, 105 km (65 mi) a town in the province of Santa Fe, with winds that exceeded 400 kilometres per hour (250 mph). And also, another F5 tornado in Encarnación, Paraguay and multiple E/F4 tornado examples in Brazil.

=== Oceania ===
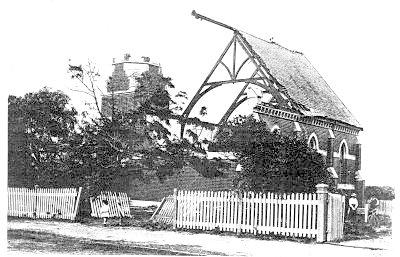
Damage caused by the 1918 Brighton tornado in Australia's Victoria state

Australia experiences about 30–80 tornadoes per year. The actual number is likely more, as tornadoes in remote regions may not be reported. Tornadoes in Australia are typically weak, though strong tornadoes have been observed. On 29 November 1992, an F4 tornado struck Bucca in Queensland.

New Zealand averages between 7 and 10 tornadoes annually, most of which are typically weak. A rare F3 tornado struck Motunui in Taranaki on 15 August 2004, killing two people and injuring two others. A deadly tornado hit the northern suburbs of Auckland on 3 May 2011, killing one and injuring at least 16 people.

== Time of occurrence ==
U. S. annual count of confirmed tornadoes. The count uptick in 1990 is correlated with the introduction of doppler weather radar.

=== Cyclonic systems ===
Tornadoes are most common in spring and least common in winter. The seasonal transition during autumn and spring promotes the development of extratropical cyclones and frontal systems that support strong convective storms. Tornadoes are common in landfalling tropical cyclones, where they are focused in the right poleward section of the cyclone. Tornadoes can be spawned as a result of eyewall mesovortices, which persist until landfall.

=== Seasonality ===
The time of year is a major factor in the intensity and frequency of tornadoes. On average, in the United States as a whole, the month with the most tornadoes is in May, followed by the months June, April, and July. There is no "tornado season" though, as tornadoes, including violent tornadoes and major outbreaks, can and do occur anywhere at any time of year if favorable conditions develop. Major tornado outbreaks have occurred every month of the year.

The reason for the peak period for tornado formation in North America being skewed toward spring has much to do with temperature patterns in the U.S. Tornadoes often form when cool, polar air traveling southeastward from the Rocky Mountains overrides warm, moist, unstable Gulf of Mexico air in the eastern states. Tornadoes tend to be commonly found in front of a cold front, along with heavy rains, hail, and damaging winds. Since both warm and cold major weather patterns collide in Spring, the conflict between the two air masses tends to the formation of tornado producing storms and supercells. As the weather warms across the country, the occurrence of tornadoes spreads northward. There is a second active tornado season of the year that usually appears in late September to mid-November. Autumn, like spring, is a time of the year when warm weather frequently alternates with cold weather, especially in the Midwest; but the season is not as active as it is during the springtime, and tornado frequencies are higher along the Atlantic coastal plain. On average, there are around 294 tornadoes throughout the United States during May, and as many as 543 tornadoes have been reported in May alone (in 2003). The months with the fewest tornadoes are usually December and January, although major tornado outbreaks can and sometimes do occur even in those months. In general, in the Midwestern and Plains states, springtime (especially the month of May) is the most active season for tornadoes, while in the far northern states (like Minnesota and Wisconsin), the peak tornado season is usually in the summer months (June and July). In the colder late autumn and winter months (from early December to late February), tornado activity is generally limited to the southern states, where warm Gulf of Mexico air can penetrate.

July is the peak month in Austria, Finland, and Germany.

=== Diurnality ===
Tornado occurrence is highly dependent on the time of day because of solar heating. Austria, Finland, Germany, and the United States' peak hour of occurrence is 5 pm, with roughly half of all tornado occurrence between 3 p.m. and 7 p.m. local time. Due to this being the time of peak atmospheric heating, and thus the maximum available energy for storms; some researchers, including Howard B. Bluestein of the University of Oklahoma, have referred to this phenomenon as "five o'clock magic." Despite this, there have been several morning tornadoes reported, such as evidenced by the Gainesville Tornado of 1936 (one of the deadliest tornadoes in history) that occurred at 8:30 a.m. local time.

== Common misconceptions ==
Tornado myths exist that may cause ill-conceived preparation, planning, and reactions to tornadoes. For instance: some people mistakenly believe that tornadoes only occur in the countryside. While it is true that the plains states are tornado-prone, tornadoes have been reported in every U.S. state, including Alaska and Hawaii. One likely reason tornadoes are so common in the central U.S. is that this is where Arctic air, cold fronts that have not been "weakened" yet first collide with warm tropical air from the Gulf of Mexico. As these fronts head further east, they sometimes lose their strength as they travel over more warm air. For this reason, tornadoes are not as common on the East Coast as they are in the Midwest. However, they have happened on rare occasions, such as the F3 tornado that struck Limerick Township, Pennsylvania near Philadelphia on 27 July 1994, the F2 tornado that struck the northern suburbs of New York City on 12 July 2006, the EF2 tornado in the borough of Brooklyn on 8 August 2007, or the F4 tornado that struck La Plata, Maryland on 28 April 2002.

Another popular misconception is that tornadoes don't occur in mountainous areas, or that mountainous terrain will protect people from tornadoes. While the frequency of tornadoes is lower in mountainous areas compared to Tornado Alley, significant tornadoes can occur regularly in the southern Appalachian region of the United States and have even been documented at high altitudes along the continental divide of Wyoming. In addition, tornado outbreaks occasionally occur around the southern Appalachian mountains, with the 1974 Super Outbreak and the 2011 Super Outbreak directly affecting the southern Appalachian region. One example of a single tornado event impacting mountainous regions, is the EF3 tornado that struck West Liberty, Kentucky on 2 March 2012.

== Long-term trends ==
The reliable climatology of tornadoes is limited in geographic and temporal scope; only since 1976 in the United States and 2000 in Europe have thorough and accurate tornado statistics been logged. However, some trends can be noted in tornadoes causing significant damage in the United States, as somewhat reliable statistics on damaging tornadoes exist as far back as 1880. The highest incidence of violent tornadoes seems to shift from the Southeastern United States to the southern Great Plains every few decades. Also, the 1980s seemed to be a period of unusually low tornado activity in the United States, and the number of multi-death tornadoes decreased every decade from the 1920s to the 1980s, suggesting a multi-decadal pattern of some sort. Also, more advanced weather warning and prediction has led to fewer tornado related deaths. Historical records going back several decades appear to show a significant increase in the number of tornadoes. This trend, which largely disappears when F0 and EF0 tornadoes are excluded, is due to population growth, damage surveys, and the advent of Doppler weather radar improving the ability to report tornadoes, especially those that are short-lived and weak. Studies of long-term tornado trends therefore focus on stronger tornadoes.

== See also ==
- List of tornadoes and tornado outbreaks
- List of F5 and EF5 tornadoes
- Tornadogenesis
- History of tornado research
