= South American Tornado Alley =

Geographical region in which tornadoes commonly occur

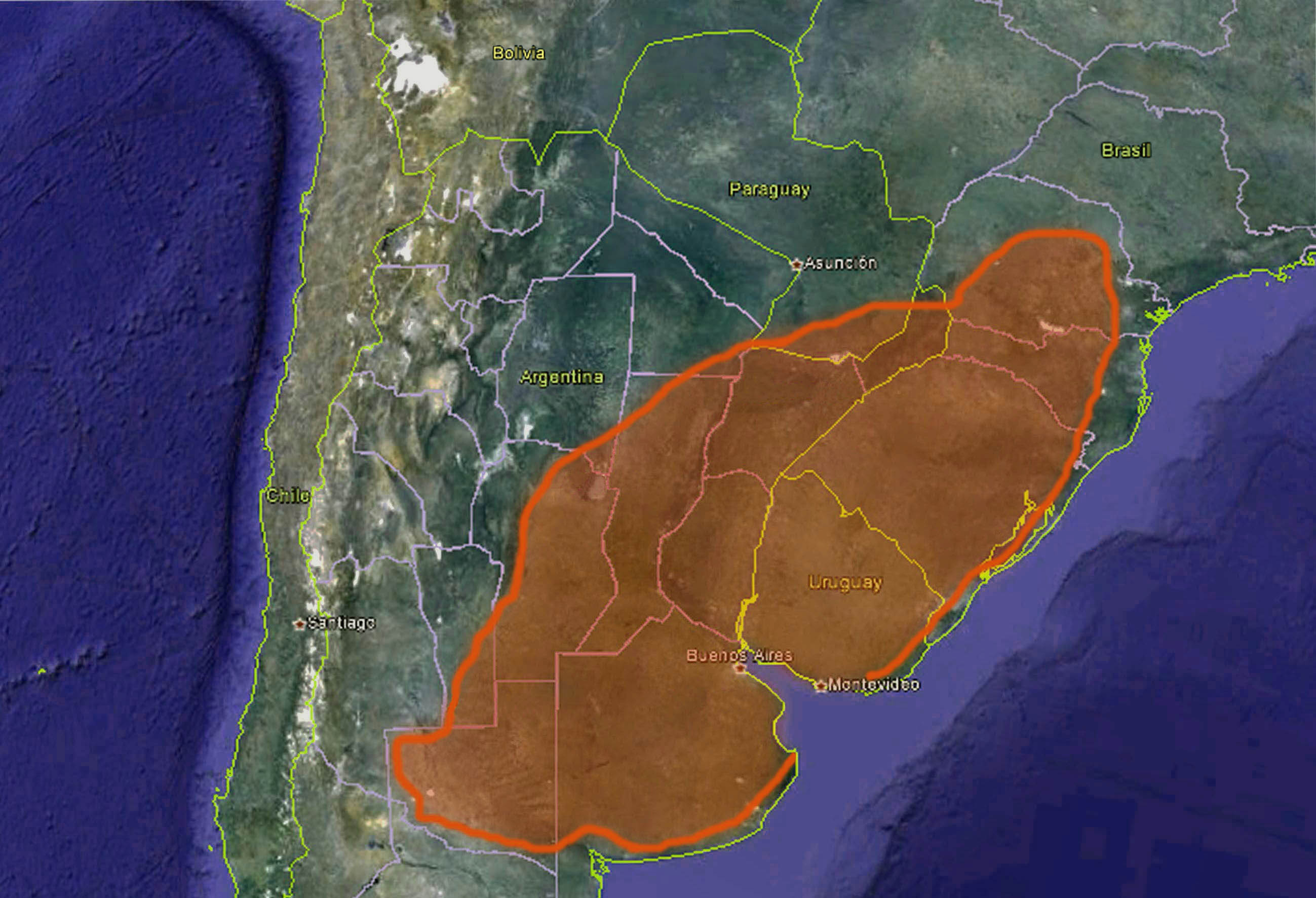
Map of the tornado-prone region in South America.

The Tornado corridor of South America is the region where cold, dry winds from the Andes and Patagonia meet warm, humid winds from the Amazon and the Chaco, creating conditions conducive to the formation of tornadoes. The area was named by the São Leopoldo Urban Climatology Station Network.

It includes the states of Rio Grande do Sul, Santa Catarina, Paraná, São Paulo, all of south-central Minas Gerais, Mato Grosso do Sul in Brazil, as well as central and northern Argentina, Uruguay, Paraguay, and the south-central portion of Bolivia. This region (especially central Argentina) is considered one of the areas with a high probability of tornado occurrence in the world. It is estimated that between 250-400 tornadoes are generated in this area per year, being more common in autumn and spring.

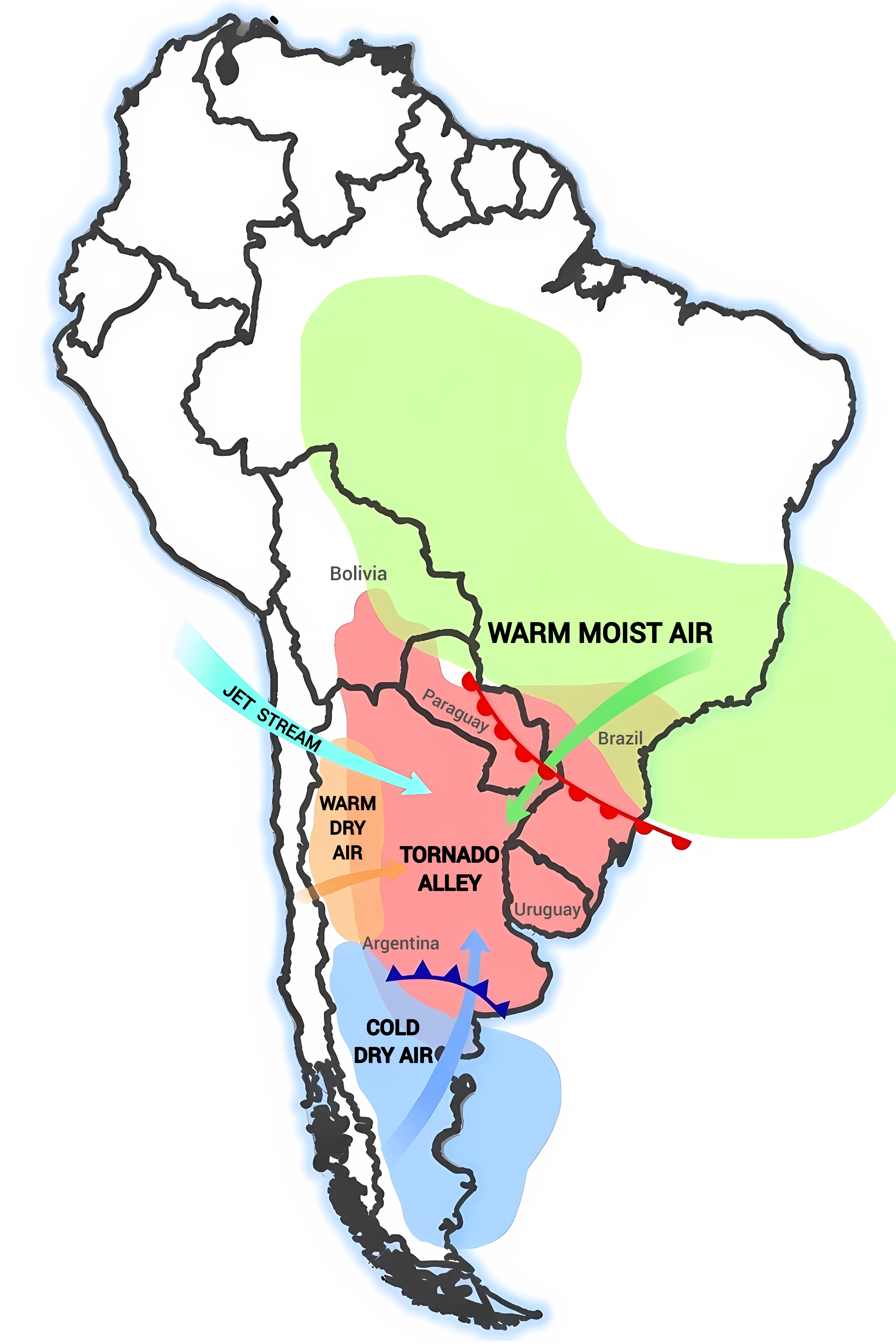
Tornado climatology in South America — Diagram explaining the meteorological systems that contribute to a higher frequency of tornadoes in the so-called Tornado Alley (in red).

== Causes ==
NASA conducted a study in 2006, using information provided by its satellites, to identify the areas where the most intense storms occur. It concluded that these occur mainly east of the Andes Mountains in Argentina. In this area, cold winds from Patagonia and Antarctica converge with warm air masses from Brazil, Paraguay, and northern Argentina, and with dry air coming from the Andes Mountains. The clash between these different air masses occurs mainly in the pampa plain and generates conditions for intense storms, hail, and tornadoes. A similar situation occurs east of the Rocky Mountains in the United States.

Due to insufficient weather radar coverage, as well as the region's low population density, it is not possible to accurately detect the number of tornadoes that occur annually in this area. Generally, only those sighted by people are recorded.

== Location ==
The Tornado Alley covers a large area of South America: its central core is located in Argentina (northern Buenos Aires province, central and eastern Córdoba, southern and central Santa Fe, west of Entre Ríos), as well as all of Uruguay. Within this zone, there is a higher probability of strong tornadoes forming; as the distance increases, the number and intensity of storms decreases. The Alley encompasses the following areas:

In Argentina

The provinces of:

- La Pampa
- North and northeast of the province of Río Negro
- South of the province of San Luis
- Much of the province of Santa Fe
- Córdoba
- Entre Ríos
- Province of Buenos Aires
- Southeast of the province of Santiago del Estero
- Southeast of the province of Chaco
- Central and eastern part of the province of Formosa
- Corrientes
- Much of the province of Misiones

In Brazil

The states of:

- Rio Grande do Sul
- Santa Catarina
- Paraná
- Mato Grosso do Sul
- Interior of the state of São Paulo
- South-central Minas Gerais

In southern Paraguay

The departments of:

- Ñeembucú
- Itapúa
- Misiones

In addition, it covers the entire territory of Uruguay.

== Measurement ==
In this region, conditions are favorable for the formation of tornadoes and intense storms, due to the large extent of the pampas plain. Cold air from Patagonia and Antarctica collides with warm, humid air coming from Brazil, northern Argentina, and Paraguay, as well as dry air from the Andes. This combination produces intense storms that very frequently reach supercell status, and many generate intense hail and tornadoes of varying intensities, mainly F0, F1, and F2.

The tornadoes in this corridor are compared to those in the region known as the "Dixie Alley Corridor" in the United States, which includes the states of Mississippi, Alabama, Georgia, Tennessee, Arkansas, Florida, and Louisiana. This is because, most of the time, tornadoes in this region are produced by high-precipitation supercells, therefore being enveloped in curtains of rain (mainly in western and southwestern Paraná, northwestern and northern Rio Grande do Sul, and western Santa Catarina), which makes the visibility of the phenomena difficult or almost nil. This characteristic is extremely dangerous, as tornadoes enveloped in rain cause more deaths and are more difficult to predict. However, in the Campinas Region, most tornadoes are produced by classic or low-precipitation supercells. Additionally, tornadoes in the Southern region of Brazil are mostly events of low available convective potential energy (CAPE) and high wind shear (0-1 km).

In southern and southeastern Brazil, they generally occur between April and November, although they appear more frequently between April and June. In central Argentina, tornadoes are most frequent in spring and summer. North of this area, intense storms begin to occur in late August, and because it is a more humid and warm zone, they can occur at any time of year. The plain encompassing the Chaco and the Pampas is less extensive and populated than that of North America, and the number of tornadoes recorded is lower. Furthermore, in South America, unlike the United States, Canada, and Europe, there are no measurements of the number of tornadoes that occur in each storm, nor are there advance warnings. There are no measurements or statistics indicating the number of tornadoes generated each year in the Tornado Alley, but it is known that the number is lower than in the United States. They are of lower intensity, as most are F0, F1, and F2 scale tornadoes, with the maximum recorded being F5.

== Registers ==
A tornado outbreak near Piracicaba, Brazil, in 2025. The city is located north of the tornado corridor.

The most intense tornadoes were those of Encarnación (Paraguay) on September 20, 1926, a tornado formed, killing approximately 500 people, making it the deadliest tornado recorded in South American history, and the San Justo tornado (Santa Fe province, Argentina) on January 10, 1973, which was the strongest tornado recorded outside the United States and also claimed the lives of 67 people. Their intensity is purely speculative since the Fujita scale, based on systematic survey damage, was only introduced in the United States in 1971 and its use in other countries took several more years.

On September 30, 1991, a narrow, high-end F4 tornado struck parts of the municipalities of Itu (SP) and Salto (SP). Well-built brick houses were flattened, vehicles were thrown hundreds of meters and mutilated beyond recognition, and thousands of trees were completely stripped of their bark and uprooted. A large luxury hotel and agricultural schools were completely devastated. Although classified as F3, meteorologists note that widespread F4 damage likely occurred with this tornado. The event caused 16 deaths and over 300 injuries.

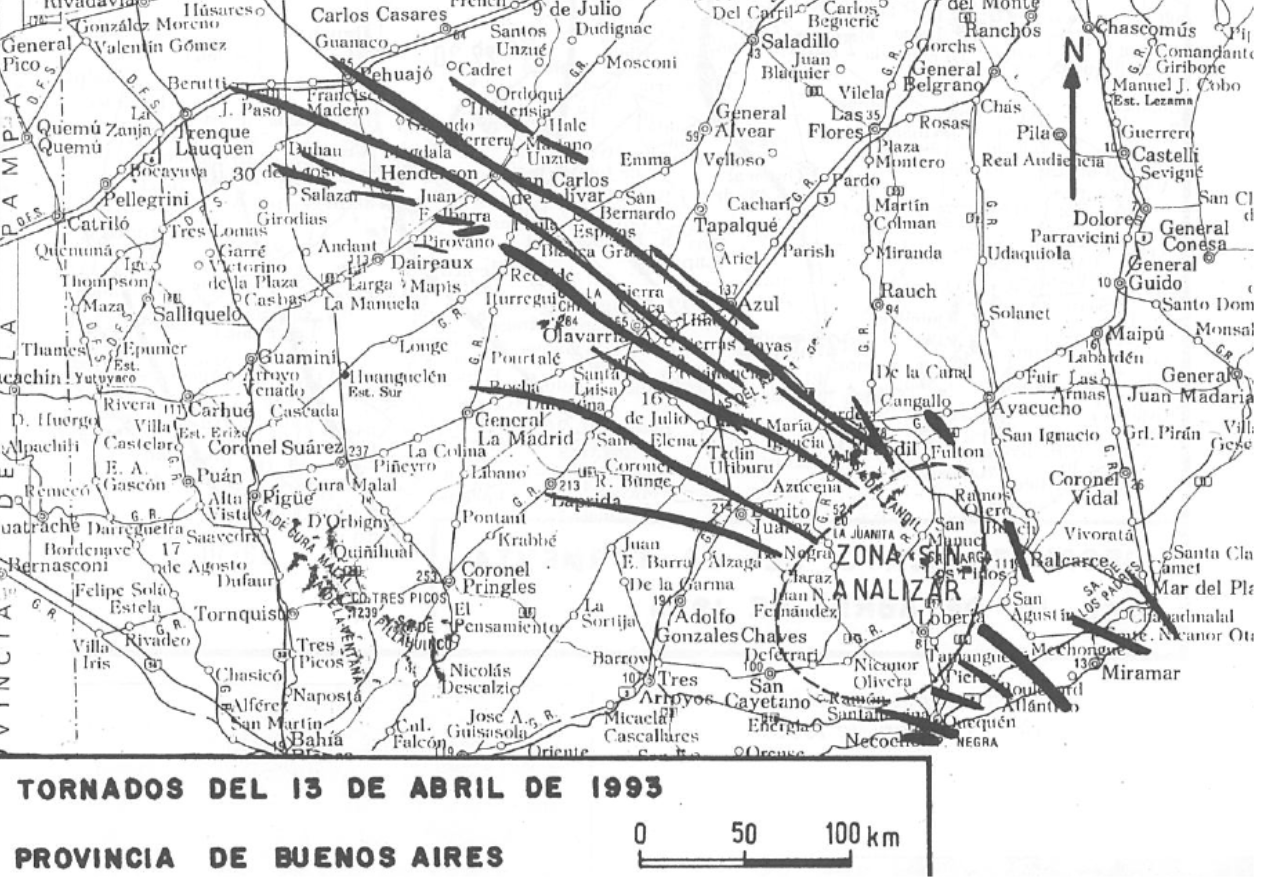
Estimated path of major tornadoes. One region of the map has been left unanalyzed.

The 1993 Buenos Aires tornado outbreak was an outbreak (QLCS type) of around 100 tornadoes that affected the southern area of Buenos Aires province. Between the evening and night of Tuesday, April 13 of 1993, an extraordinary system of severe convective storms affected the localities of Trenque Lauquen, Pehuajó, Hipólito Yrigoyen, Carlos Casares, Bolívar, Daireaux, General Lamadrid, Olavarría, Tapalqué, Azul, Laprida, Benito Juárez, Tandil, Necochea, Lobería, Balcarce, General Alvarado and General Pueyrredon. The most affected localities were Henderson (F3), Urdampilleta (F3) and Mar del Plata (F2). This succession of tornadoes had intensities ranging from F0 to F3 and produced severe damage along northwest to southeast-oriented strips. The local area affected exceeded 4,000 square kilometers (1500 sq mi). The phenomenon was popularly called "La Noche De Los 100 Tornados" (the night of 100 tornadoes) and it holds the record for being the largest tornado outbreak ever recorded in the southern hemisphere.

In Brazil, the most intense tornadoes occurred in Itu (São Paulo)/1991, Nova Laranjeiras (Paraná)/1997 and Guaraciaba (Santa Catarina)/2009. In Nova Laranjeiras, an F4 estimated tornado resulted in the total destruction of more than 80% of residences (mostly brick masonry), with many of them being fully razed to the ground. In Guaraciaba, F4 damage was widespread and very significant, as trees were uprooted and derbarked, cars were thrown great distances and mutilated beyond recognition, masonry houses were wiped off the map, and objects were found hundreds of kilometers from their original location.

The worst violent tornadoes that occurred much further north in the South American tornado corridor and outside the mid-latitudes were the events in Ivinhema (MS)/1989 as an F3, Ponta Porã (MS)/1999, Brasilândia-Panorama (MS and SP)/2015 as an F2, and Ribeirão Preto (SP)/1994 also as an F2. Strongest tornadoes outside this tornado corridor, occurred in Saquarema (Rio de Janeiro)/2004 as an estimated F2 and Cidade Ocidental (Goiás)/2010 also as an estimated F2.

== See also ==
- Tornado climatology
- List of tornadoes in Argentina
- List of tornadoes in Paraguay
- List of tornadoes in Brazil
