= Tornado myths =

Common misconceptions about tornadoes

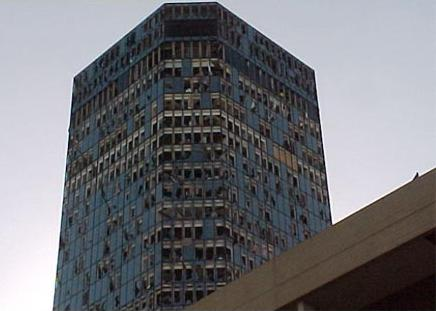
Downtown damaged by the 2000 Fort Worth tornado

Tornado myths are incorrect beliefs about tornadoes, which can be attributed to many factors, including stories and news reports told by people unfamiliar with tornadoes, sensationalism by news media, and the presentation of incorrect information in popular entertainment. Common myths cover various aspects of the tornado, and include ideas about tornado safety, the minimization of tornado damage, and false assumptions about the size, shape, power, and path of the tornado itself.

Some people incorrectly believe that opening windows ahead of a tornado will reduce the damage from the storm. Some people also believe that escaping in a vehicle is the safest method of avoiding a tornado, but this could increase the danger in some situations. Other myths are that tornadoes can skip houses, always travel in a predictable direction, always extend visibly from the ground to the cloud, and increase in intensity with increasing width. Finally, some people believe that tornadoes occur only in North America, do not occur in winter, and that some areas are protected from tornadoes by rivers, mountains, valleys, tall buildings or other geographical or man-made features; the truth is that tornadoes can occur almost anywhere at any time if the conditions are right. Some geographic areas are simply more prone to these conditions than others.

Some tornado myths are remaining bits of folklore that are passed down by word of mouth. The idea that the southwest corner of a structure is the safest place in a tornado was first published in the 1800s and persisted until the 1990s despite being thoroughly debunked in the 1960s and 1970s. One notable instance of mass media spreading a tornado myth was after the 1999 Oklahoma tornado outbreak, where TIME magazine ran a caption on a picture suggesting that highway overpasses were safer tornado shelters than houses. The spread of some myths can be attributed to popular tornado-themed movies such as The Wizard of Oz and Twister.

== Safety ==
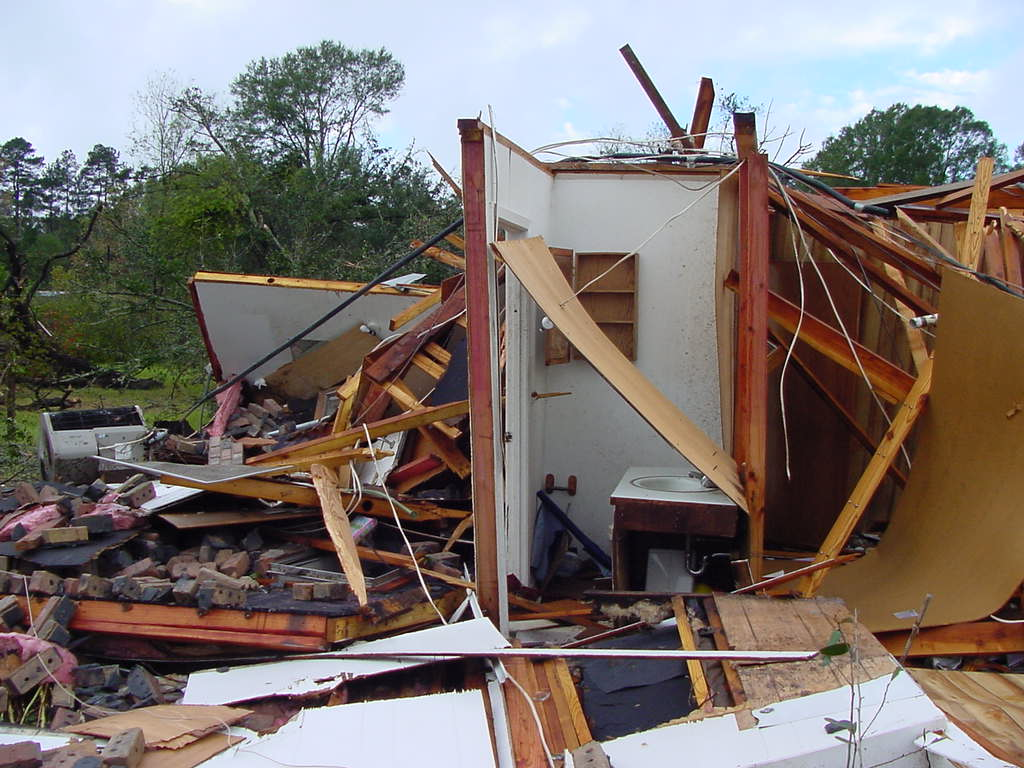
This house near Jasper, Texas, was destroyed by an F2 tornado, with only a few interior walls still standing.

=== Safest location in a building ===
In 1887 the first book on tornadoes was written by John Park Finley, a pioneer in the field of tornado research. While it was a revolutionary book containing many breakthrough ideas, it contained a few ideas that have since been proven false. One of these was the idea that the northeast or east part of a structure was the least safe, and should be avoided when seeking shelter from a tornado.

This myth was derived from two misconceptions: First, that tornadoes always travel in a northeasterly direction, and second, that debris from a structure will be carried away in the direction of the tornado's propagation, leaving anyone taking shelter on the side of the structure facing the tornado's approach unharmed. The seriousness of these misconceptions began to be revealed in the 1960s and 1970s, when surveys of major tornado damage in residential areas showed that the section of a house in the direction of the tornado's approach is actually the least safe. Additionally, many tornadoes have traveled in directions other than northeasterly, including the Jarrell tornado (F5 on the Fujita scale), which moved south-southwesterly. Because determining a tornado's direction of approach can take time away from seeking shelter, official advice is to seek shelter in an interior room on the lowest floor of a building, under a staircase, I-beam, or sturdy piece of furniture if possible.

=== Opening windows to reduce tornado damage ===
One of the oldest pieces of tornado folklore is the idea that tornadoes do most of their damage due to the lower atmospheric pressure at the center of a tornado, which causes the house to explode outward. The supposition was that opening windows helps to equalize the pressure.

The source of this myth is from the appearance of some destroyed structures after violent tornadoes. When one wall receives the extreme pressure of tornado winds, it will likely collapse inward. This then leads to a considerable outward pressure on the three remaining walls, which fall outwards as the roof falls down, creating the impression of a house which has exploded. Damage surveys of "exploded" houses usually show at least one wall that was blown inward. Additionally, if the roof is lifted before any walls fall, the walls can fall in any direction. If they fall outward, this structure can also appear to have exploded.

In even the most violent tornadoes, there is a pressure drop of only about 10%, which is about 1.4 pounds per square inch (9.7 kPa). Not only can this difference be equalized in most structures in approximately three seconds, but if a significant pressure differential manages to form, the windows will break first, equalizing the pressure. Additionally, as the windows are the most fragile parts of a house, in a significant tornado flying debris will likely break enough windows to equalize any pressure difference fairly quickly. Regardless of any pressure drop, the direct effects of a tornado's winds are enough to cause damage to a house in all but the weakest tornadoes.

Current advice is that opening windows in advance of a tornado wastes time that could be spent seeking shelter. Also, being near windows is very dangerous during a severe weather event, possibly exposing people to flying glass.

=== Using highway overpasses as shelter ===
There are several documented cases of people surviving under highway overpasses, but scientists warn against using them for protection. From scientific lessons learned, meteorologists insist that overpasses are insufficient shelter from tornado winds and debris, and may be among the worst places to take refuge during a violent tornado. The embankment under an overpass is higher than the surrounding terrain, and the wind speed increases with height. Additionally, the overpass design may create a wind tunnel effect under the span, further increasing the wind speed. Many overpasses are completely exposed underneath and most lack hanging girders or a crawlspace-like area to provide sufficient protection from debris, which can travel at high speeds even in weak tornadoes. People stopping underneath overpasses may also block the flow of traffic, putting others in danger.

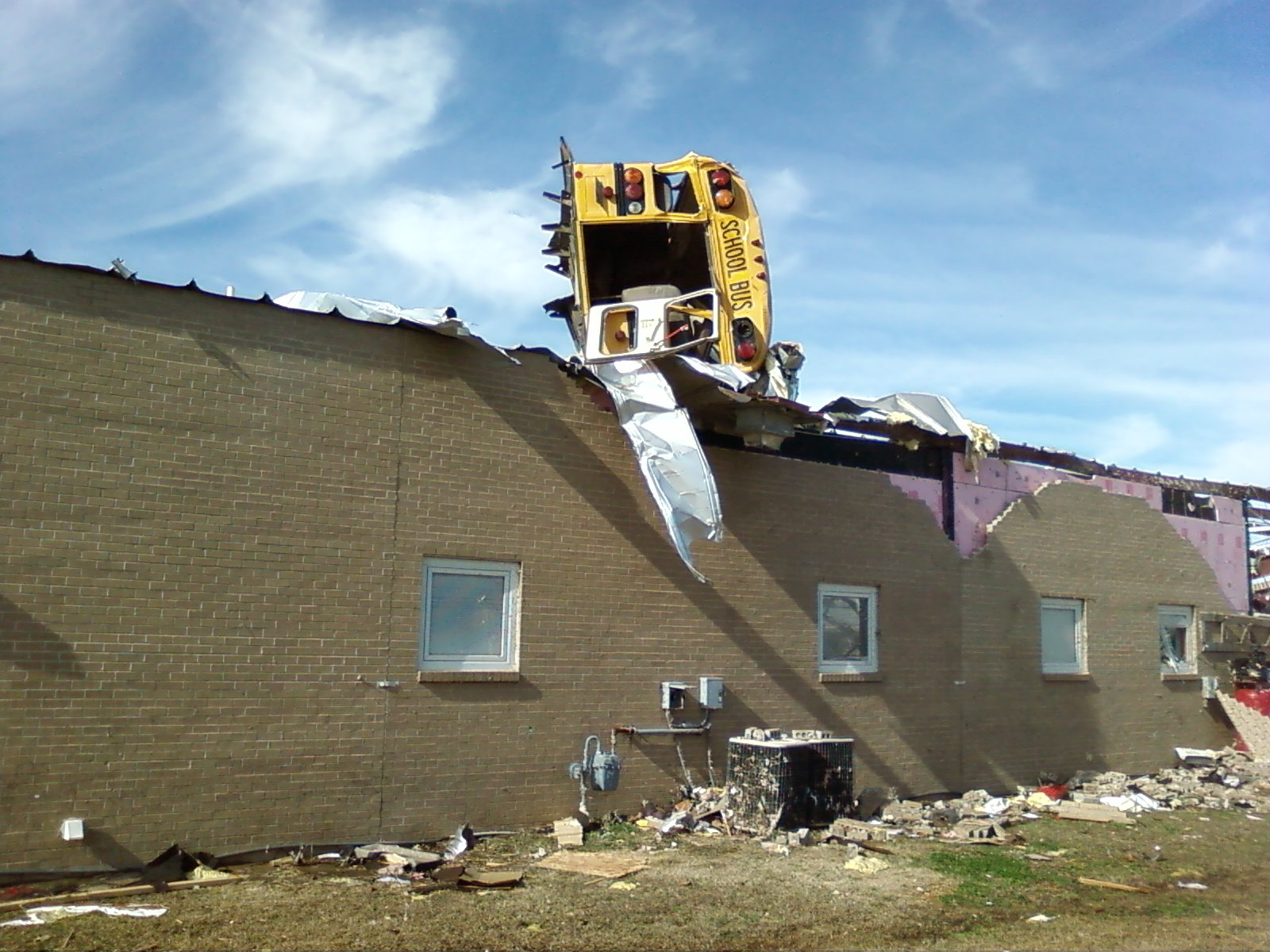
A 2008 tornado lifted this school bus and flipped it on top of an elementary school in Caledonia, Mississippi.

=== Escaping a tornado in a vehicle ===
Often people try to avoid or outrun a tornado in a vehicle. Although cars can travel faster than the average tornado, the directive from the National Weather Service is for house-dwellers in the path of a tornado to take shelter at home rather than risk an escape by vehicle. This is a result of several factors and statistics. An interior room inside a well-built frame house (especially one with a basement) provides a reasonable degree of protection from all but the most violent tornadoes. Underground tornado shelters, as well as extremely strong structures such as bank vaults, offer almost complete protection. Cars, on the other hand, can be heavily damaged by even weak tornadoes, and in violent tornadoes they can be thrown large distances, even into buildings. High-profile vehicles such as buses and tractor trailers are even more vulnerable to high winds.

There are many reasons to avoid cars when a tornado is imminent. Severe thunderstorms that produce tornadoes can produce flooding rains, hail, and strong winds far from the tornado-producing area, all of which can make driving difficult or even impossible. Any of these situations can leave drivers stranded in the path of the tornado far from substantial shelter. When coupled with driver panic, they may also result in dangerous but preventable accidents. This situation would be magnified greatly if all the residents of a warned area left in their vehicles, which would cause traffic jams and accidents as the tornado approached. Numerous victims of the deadly Wichita Falls, Texas, tornado on April 10, 1979, died in their vehicles in such a situation.

If a person spots a nearby tornado while driving, the official National Weather Service directive has been for the individual to abandon the car and seek shelter in a ditch or culvert, or substantial shelter if nearby. Far-away, highly visible tornadoes, however, can be successfully avoided by driving across (not ahead of) its apparent path. Despite dangers inherent with operating a vehicle during a tornado, given sufficient advance warning, mobile home residents have been instructed by the National Weather Service to drive to the nearest secure shelter during a warning.

=== Weak tornadoes ===
Flying debris is a hazard even with weak tornadoes.

Despite being considered "weak" on the Enhanced Fujita scale or the Fujita scale, (E)F0 and (E)F1 tornadoes can be a source of significant injuries or even deaths. They can completely destroy mobile homes well before other structures receive significant damage. A 1978 F1 tornado struck Osage County, Kansas, causing the Whippoorwill tourist boat to capsize, resulting in the drowning of 16 passengers, among the highest tornadic death tolls in Kansas history. On March 31, 2023, an EF1 tornado struck the Apollo Theatre of Belvidere, Illinois, causing the building to collapse onto a sold-out concert, resulting in one fatality and 48 injuries. That same day another EF1 tornado struck urban areas of Tupelo, Mississippi, destroying a Cooper Tire & Rubber Company plant and resulting in over $100,000,000 in damage.

== Tornado behavior ==
=== Tornadoes skipping houses ===
Several different phenomena have lent credence to the idea that tornadoes "skip" houses, like a person jumping over hurdles. Tornadoes vary in intensity along their path, sometimes drastically over a short period and distance. If a tornado was causing damage, then weakened to the point where it could cause no damage, followed by a re-intensification, it would appear as if it skipped a section. Occasionally with violent tornadoes, a smaller subvortex within a tornado will completely destroy a structure next to another building that appears almost unscathed and thus apparently skipped over.

It is true that a house between two destroyed houses can be undamaged, but this is not the result of a tornado skipping, as some previously thought. After the 1974 Super Outbreak, Ted Fujita studied many films of tornadoes from that day. Included in his review was damage and tornado film footage of F4 and F5 tornadoes. Fujita concluded that multiple vortices, highly volatile tornadic satellites transiting within a parent tornado at high speeds, are responsible for making tornadoes appear to skip houses. The phenomenon of satellite tornadoes, where a smaller tornado orbits a larger companion tornado, can also lead to gaps in damage between the two tornadoes.

Weaker tornadoes, and at times even stronger tornadoes, can occasionally lift, meaning their circulation ceases to affect the ground temporarily. The result is an erratic and discontinuous linear damage path, leading to the term skipping tornado. These discontinuities tend to occur over areas larger than the small neighborhoods where the house-skipping effect is observed, except possibly at the time of the birth and organization of the tornado. This situation is not commonly observed and the term is now rarely applied. Typically, when one tornado weakens and another forms, the process of successive parent mesocyclones forming and decaying is known as cyclic tornadogenesis, thus leading to a series of tornadoes spawned by the same supercell. This series of tornadoes is known as a tornado family.

The Elie, Manitoba, tornado of June 22, 2007, appeared small and narrow throughout its lifespan; yet it was the first tornado in Canadian history to cause F5 damage.

=== Association of size with intensity ===
Some people have been led to assume that small, skinny tornadoes are always weaker than large, wedge-shaped tornadoes. There is an observed trend of wider tornadoes causing worse damage. It is unknown whether this is due to an actual tendency of tornado dynamics or an ability for the tornado to affect a larger area. However, this is not a reliable indicator of an individual tornado's intensity. Some small, rope-like tornadoes, traditionally thought of as weak, have been among the strongest in history. Since 1950, more than 100 violent tornadoes (F4/EF4 or higher) had a maximum width of 300 feet (91 m). Also, tornadoes typically change shape during the course of their lifespan, further complicating any attempt to classify how dangerous a tornado is as it is occurring.

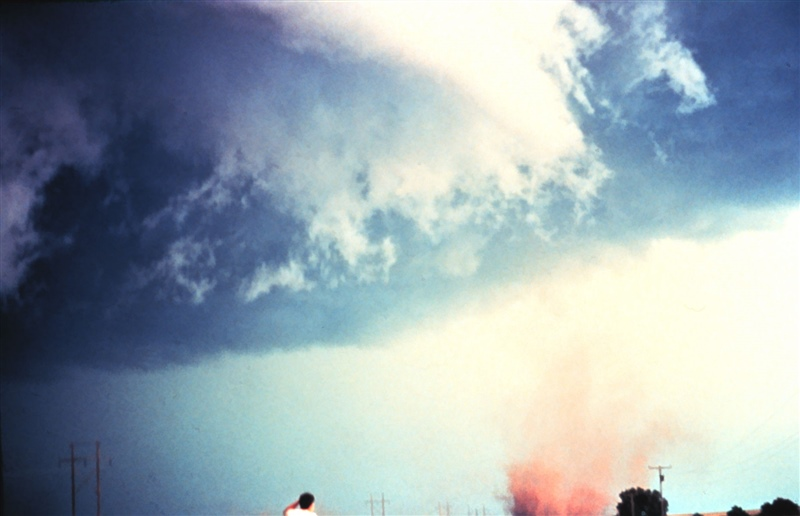
A tornado, marked by debris swirl on the ground and connected to a thundercloud, with no condensation funnel

=== Appearing to reach the ground ===
It is commonly and mistakenly thought that if the condensation funnel of a tornado does not reach the ground, then the tornado cannot cause substantial damage. Furthermore, a tornado is sometimes believed to be on the ground only when its condensation funnel descends to the surface, but this assumption is misleading and extremely dangerous. The 2013 El Reno tornado is one such example that disproves both beliefs, as it featured an expansive and translucent outer circulation with an incomplete condensation funnel. The circular, violent surface winds (not the condensation funnel) are what both define the tornado and cause the tornado's damage. Spotters should keep sight of swirling debris directly under any visible funnel or rotating wall cloud, even if such structures appear to not descend entirely to the ground. Additionally, tornadoes can be wrapped in rain and thus may not be visible at all.

=== Direction of travel ===
It has been thought in the past that tornadoes moved almost exclusively in a northeasterly direction. This is false, and a potentially deadly myth that can lead to a false sense of security, especially for unaware spotters or chasers. Although the majority of tornadoes move northeast, this is normally due to the motion of the storm, and tornadoes can move in any direction. The expectation of northeasterly travel may be accurate in many cases, but is a statistical observation about the most usual direction of travel that cannot be applied to predict the movement of a particular tornado. A deadly F5 tornado that hit the city of Jarrell, Texas, in 1997 moved to the southwest – directly opposite to the commonly expected storm motion. Another notable example is the 1990 Plainfield tornado, a significant and deadly F5 tornado that traveled from northwest-to-southeast. A 2008 tornado in Colorado moved in a southeast-to-northwest direction, which is very rare.

Tornadoes can also change direction unpredictably due to storm motion changes or effects on the tornado itself from factors such as its rear flank downdraft. Tornadoes are known to occasionally differ in movement from their parent storms; such motion is referred to in meteorology as deviant motion. Typically, this is a simple left or right direction turn, as seen in many tornadoes during the 1974 Super Outbreak, as well as the 2013 El Reno tornado which killed four storm chasers when it changed direction. However, much more erratic paths have been observed in certain violent tornadoes, including the 2007 Elie tornado, 1976 Lemont tornado, and the 2024 Hollister tornado, (Note: While this tornado was assigned only an EF1 rating, it is believed to have been much stronger.) which were observed to have nearly or completely reversed their direction of motion entirely at some point in their path.

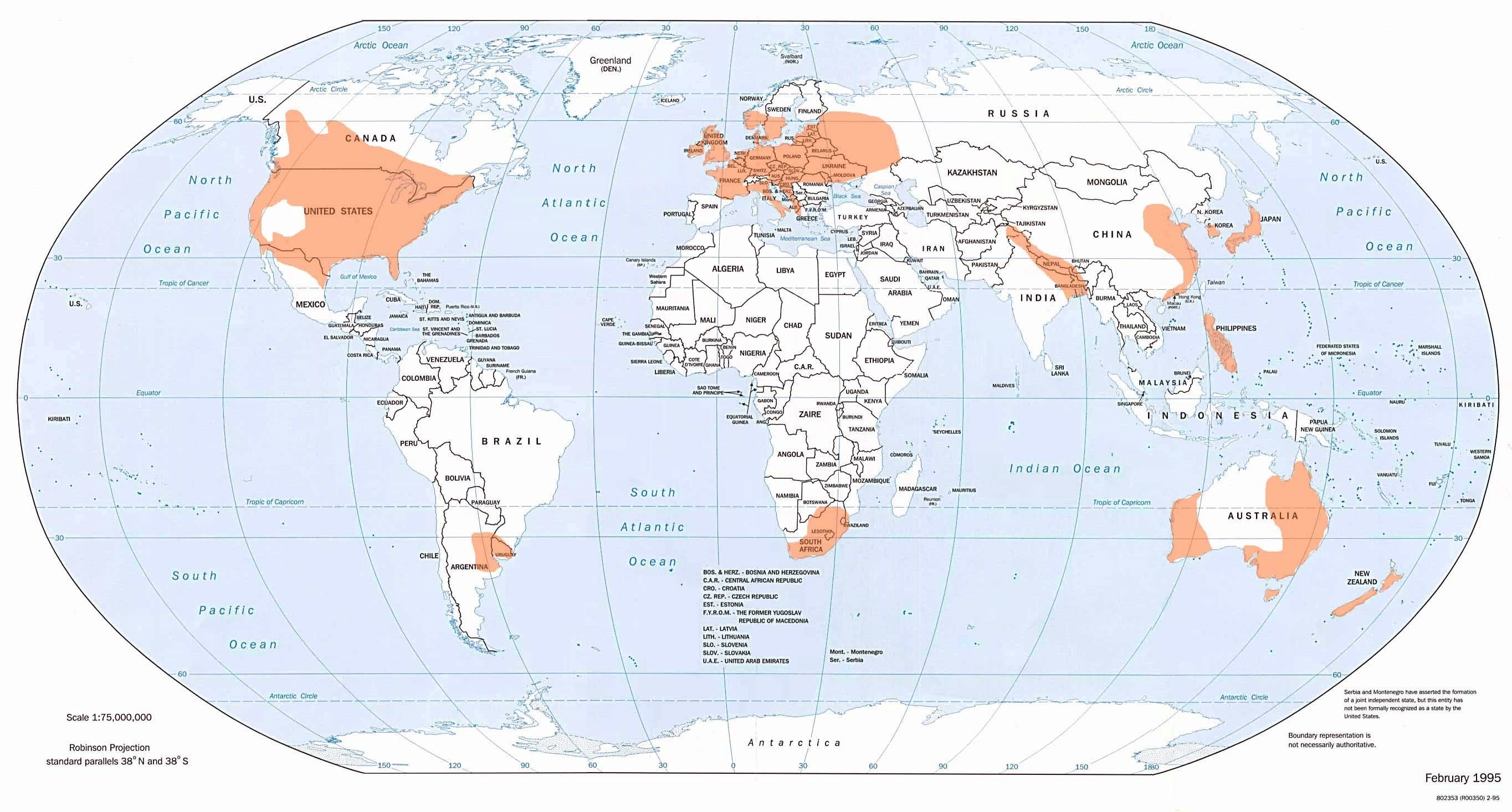
Where tornadoes are most likely

== Geographical and temporal influences ==
=== Geographical scope ===
It is often thought that tornadoes occur only in North America. The majority of recorded tornadoes do occur in the United States and Canada; however, tornadoes have been observed on every continent except Antarctica.

Europe, Argentina, Australia, Bangladesh, and eastern India often experience tornadoes. South America has its own tornado alley, covering parts of Argentina, Brazil, Paraguay, and Uruguay, which has produced several violent tornadoes. The country with the most tornadoes by area is England.

=== Near rivers, valleys, mountains, or other terrain features ===
There are many misconceptions involving the effect of terrain features – bodies of water, mountains, valleys, and others – on tornado formation and behavior. While most modes of tornadogenesis are poorly understood, no terrain feature can prevent the occurrence of a tornado.

Small bodies of water such as lakes and rivers are insignificant obstacles to tornadoes. Violent tornadoes have formed over rivers and lakes – including the 1878 Wallingford tornado, the 1899 New Richmond tornado, and more recently the 2012 West Liberty tornado. More than a dozen tornadoes are reported to have crossed the Mississippi River. Strong tornadoes have also been known to cross the Detroit River and St. Clair River separating the United States and Canada.

Regarding mountains, tornadoes have been observed on terrain as high as 12,000 feet (3,700 m) above sea level, and have been known to pass up a 3,000-foot (910 m) ridge unaffected.

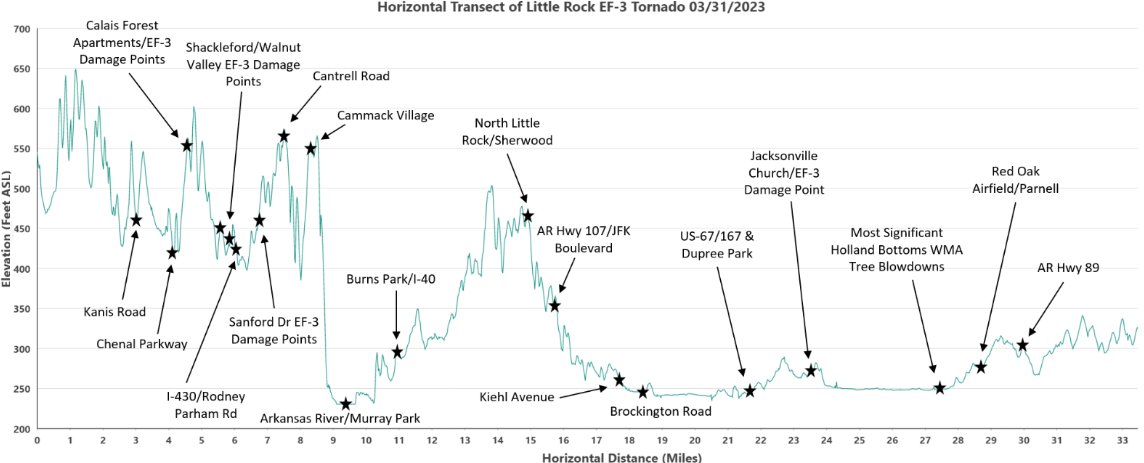
Chart of the 2023 Little Rock tornado's elevation at various stages of its life

The devastating Tri-State Tornado crossed two major rivers along a record 219-mile (352 km) or longer path. In 1944 a violent F4 tornado cut through the Appalachian Mountains, impacting Shinnston, West Virginia and killing at least 100 people throughout its 65 mile (105 km) path. In more modern times, in 2012, an intense EF3 tornado struck West Liberty, Kentucky, a city located in the Cumberland Plateau of the Appalachians. A hill known as Burnett's Mound on the southwest end of Topeka, Kansas was purported to protect the city from tornadoes, according to an old legend. However, in 1966, an F5 tornado passed directly over the hill through downtown, killing 18 people and causing $100 million (1966 USD) in damage. This myth continues to persist, and was further compounded by the fact that Burnett's Mound was rumored to be a burial ground of the Kansa Tribe, and that Topekans had committed sacrilege by attempting to build a water tower on the grounds immediately prior to the 1966 F5 tornado, despite strong opposition as a result of the myth. Downtown Memphis, Tennessee, was believed by residents to be protected from tornadoes and other severe weather by the Chickasaw Bluff along the Mississippi River. During the 1974 Super Outbreak, violent tornadoes crossed dozens of rivers, including the Ohio River and Detroit River, as well as crossing mountains and ridges hundreds of feet high. Another example of tornadoes hitting mountainous regions of the United States is the 2011 Super Outbreak, which hit mountainous parts of East Tennessee, Northeast Alabama, Southwest Virginia and North Georgia, killing many people, including an entire family of four in Ringgold, Georgia. Numerous tornadoes that day moved over the Sand Mountain, including the Flat Rock–Trenton EF4 tornado and Rainsville EF5 tornado. The 2023 Little Rock tornado tracked over significant uneven terrain, with the most intense damage being recorded in a low point geographically in its path.

As of 2026, the most recent tornado to have crossed a mountain range, was the 2025 Somerset–London tornado, as part of the tornado outbreak of May 15–16, 2025.

=== Attraction to mobile homes and/or trailer parks ===
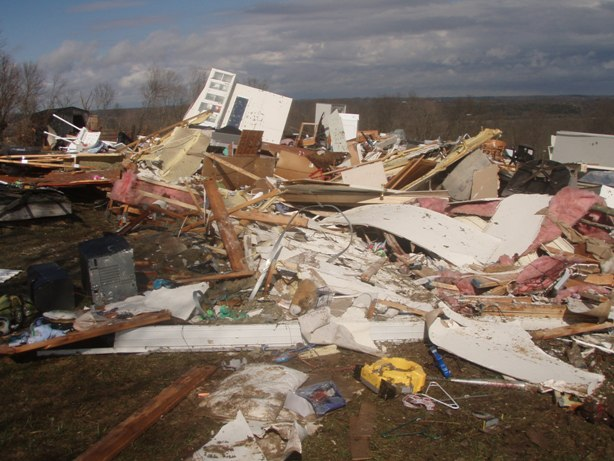
This mobile home was destroyed by a relatively weak EF0 tornado.

The idea that manufactured housing units, or mobile homes, attract tornadoes has been around for decades. This may appear to be true at first from looking at tornado fatality statistics: from 2000 to 2008, 539 people were killed by tornadoes in the US, with more than half (282) of those deaths in mobile homes. Only around 6.8% of homes in the US are "manufactured/mobile homes".

However, it is highly unlikely that single-story structures such as mobile homes can have a substantial effect on tornado development or evolution. More people are killed in trailer parks because mobile homes are less able to withstand high winds than permanent structures. Winds that can demolish or roll a mobile home may cause only roof damage to a typical one- or two-family permanent residence. Another likely contributing factor to the continued propagation of this myth is confirmation bias: whenever a new instance of a tornado hitting a mobile home park occurs, media outlets report on it more extensively, ignoring damage to the surrounding area that may not have produced as many casualties.

=== Downtown areas ===
Some people believe that, for various reasons, large cities cannot be struck by tornadoes. More than a hundred tornadoes have been reported to strike downtown areas of large cities. Many cities have been struck twice or more, and a few – including Lubbock, Texas; Regina, Saskatchewan; St. Louis, Missouri; Topeka, Kansas – have been struck by violent tornadoes (F4 or stronger).

Tornadoes may seem rare in downtown areas because they are relatively small: as the size of a central business district is a small part of the whole town, tornadoes will strike outside the downtown area more often.

The misconception, like most, has a small basis in truth. Research has been done in a few metropolitan areas suggesting that the urban heat island effect may discourage the formation of weak tornadoes in city centers, due to turbulent warm air disrupting their formation. This does not apply to significant tornadoes, however, and it is possible that the presence of tall buildings may actually intensify storms that move into downtown areas.

Two specific myths state that Chicago is not susceptible to tornadoes. One states that cold air coming off of Lake Michigan prevents tornadoes from reaching downtown; this is not true, and while the relatively cooler air coming off the lake can influence some tornadoes, others have been seen forming near the lakefront and some have moved over the lake itself. Another myth states that urban development and Chicago's tall buildings protect the city from tornadoes; buildings have a negligible effect on the formation and path of a tornado, with the storms that produce tornadoes being significantly taller than even the tallest structures in the city.

Multiple nuclear reactor sites have been struck directly by tornadoes, including the Enrico Fermi Nuclear Generating Station and Argonne National Laboratory. However, nuclear facilities in the United States are built to withstand winds upwards of 250 mph (400 km/h), and minimal damage to the reactors themselves was noted in both instances.

=== During winter ===
Because they generally require warm weather to form, tornadoes are uncommon in winter in the mid-latitudes. However, they can form, and tornadoes have even been known to travel over snow-covered surfaces. Deadly tornadoes are no exception: from 2000 to 2008, 135 of the 539 US tornado deaths occurred during meteorological winter (December through February). Tornadoes in winter may be more dangerous, since they tend to move faster than tornadoes at other times of the year. For instance, the violent and deadly 2021 Western Kentucky tornado formed on the evening of December 10, well into meteorological winter, and maintained a consistent forward speed of 60 mph (97 km/h), killing 57 and injuring more than 500.

=== Green skies are a precursor to a tornado ===
A common misconception is that green skies are indicative of a tornado. While severe weather events have been known to produce clouds with a green hue, there is no known correlation between green skies and tornadoes. Green skies are typically caused by hail-producing derechos; the height of the cloud can also cause a green color to be visible. The misconception is due to the fact that hail is typically produced in the same area of a storm as a tornado.

== See also ==
- List of common misconceptions
- List of F5 and EF5 tornadoes
- List of tornadoes and tornado outbreaks
- List of tornadoes striking downtown areas
- Tornado records
- Shape of tornadoes
- Size of tornadoes
- Tornadoes of 2026
