= List of South American tornadoes and tornado outbreaks =

These are some notable tornadoes, tornado outbreaks, and tornado outbreak sequences that have occurred in South America.

== Argentina ==
Event	Date	Area	Tornadoes	Casualties	Notes
Rojas tornado	September 16, 1816	Rojas, Buenos Aires Province	1	21 fatalities, 82 injuries	One of the first documented tornadoes in Argentina, rated an F4.
Dolores tornado	1874	Dolores, Buenos Aires Province	1	0	Parts of the town were destroyed.
Arroyo Seco tornado	November 13, 1889	Arroyo Seco, Santa fé Province	1	10 fatalities, 80+ injuries	The south of Arroyo was destroyed, with only 5 homes undamaged. It was mentioned that freight train wagons flew through the air. Possibly an F4 tornado.
Bolívar tornado/storm	September 7, 1902	Bolívar, Buenos Aires Province	1	15-20 fatalities, 65 injured	The city of Bolívar was severely damaged by a violent thunderstorm (downburst) or a strong tornado.
Villa María tornado	November 12, 1928	Córdoba Province	1	26 fatalities, 150 injured	The towns of Villa Maria and Villa Nueva were greatly affected by a tornado that caused great damage.
Chillar tornado	March 14, 1936	Buenos Aires Province	1	8-3 fatalities, 100 injured	The small town of Chillar was heavily damaged by a tornado that destroyed dozens of residences and overturned automobiles and train cars.
General San Martín tornado	October 27, 1965	Chaco Province	1	3 fatalities, 50 injuries	Half of General San Martín was destroyed.
San Justo tornado	10 January 1973	Santa Fe Province, Argentina	1	63 fatalities, 350 injuries	Very large and extremely violent high-end F5 tornado; possibly the strongest tornado in the Southern Hemisphere.
Isla Verde tornado	January 13, 1976	Isla Verde, Córdoba	1	2 fatalities, Many injuries	A violent tornado, classified as F3, hit the city of Isla Verde in the province of Córdoba, causing a bus to overturn and destroying a large part of the city. The tornado caused two deaths and many injuries.
Morteros tornado	28 October 1978	Morteros, Provincia de Córdoba, Argentina	1	5 fatalities, 100 injured	One of the strongest tornadoes ever recorded in Córdoba Province. It was rated as an F3.
Dolores tornado	November 25, 1985	Argentina	1	1 fatality, 30 injured	F3 tornado.
1993 Super Outbreak	13 April 1993	Buenos Aires Province, Argentina	≥100	7 fatalities, 80 injuries	The outbreak of tornadoes in Buenos Aires in 1993 was an outbreak (QLCS type) of more than ≥100 tornadoes that affected the southern part of Buenos Aires. It happened between the night of Tuesday, April 13 and 14. Between the hour 20 and 24, an extraordinary system of severe convective thunderstorms affected the localities of Trenque Lauquen, Pehuajó, Hipólito Yrigoyen, Carlos Casares, Bolívar, Daireaux, General Lamadrid, Olavarría, Tapalqué, Azul, Laprida, Benito Juárez, Tandil, Necochea, Lobería, Balcarce, General Alvarado and General Pueyrredon. The most affected localities were Henderson (F3), Urdampilleta (F3) and Mar del Plata (F2). This succession of tornadoes had intensities from F0 to F3 and produced severe damage along strips oriented from northwest to southeast. The local area affected was greater than 4,000 square kilometres (1,500 sq mi).
Estacion Lopez tornado	May 6, 1992	Buenos Aires Province, Argentina	1	4 fatalities	F4 tornado.
Guernica tornadoes (2000)	26 December 2000	Guernica, Dolores and Chascomus, Buenos Aires Province, Argentina	~12	1 fatality, 51 injuries	The towns of Guernica and Chascomus were destroyed. Fifteen homes were severely damaged in the town of Dolores. F2 and F3 tornadoes.
2001 Guernica tornadoes	January 10, 2001	Guernica and Glew, Buenos Aires Province, Argentina	1	5 fatalities, 250 injuries	Guernica was destroyed once again by an F3 tornado.
Córdoba tornado	26 December 2003	Córdoba, Argentina	1	5 fatalities, 90 injuries	An F3 tornado left thousands of homes destroyed. Also 1000 trees and 150 ceilings were severely damaged. The tornado lasted 24 minutes and affected three neighborhoods, making it the longest-lasting tornado in the Southern Hemisphere.
2006 Chivilcoy tornadoes	January 7, 2006	Chivilcoy, Buenos Aires Province, Argentina	5	1 fatality, 9 injuries	23 structures were destroyed by an F2 in Chivilcoy.
Buenos Aires, Argentina waterspouts	March 1, 2008	Buenos Aires, Provincia de Buenos Aires, Argentina	2	-	Two tornadic waterspouts formed over the La Plata river.
Northeastern Misiones Tornado outbreak of September, 7	September 7, 2009	Misiones, Argentina	28	17 fatalities, >250 injuries	The tornado outbreak in Argentina in 2009 was an outbreak of 28 confirmed tornadoes that occurred on the night of September 7 and violently affected the northeast of Misiones and Southern Brazil. The event reached and destroyed several localities. It is estimated that at least 17 people died and more than 250 people were injured. Many other cities were destroyed and damaged by tornadoes. Around 8:30 p.m. on September 7, a supercell produced an F4 tornado that destroyed the city of San Pedro. The event was accompanied by a violent storm of hail and rain. The tornado lasted approximately 5 minutes. It had a width of 1 kilometre (3,300 ft) and its route exceeded 10 kilometres (6.2 mi). At least 11 people died and another 100 people were injured in San Pedro. The amount of tornadoes that affected the area is comparable to the size of the province of Tucumán in Argentina. It is estimated that a total of 17 people died and just over 250 injured. Regardless of tornadoes, other adverse storm phenomena also produced damage in a large area. Reconstruction of villages, towns and cities took several years and it was noted that some could never be reclaimed. Confirmed tornadoes by Fujita rating: FU / F0 / F1 / F2 / F3 / F4 / F5 / Total; 0 / 0 / 0 / 0 / 3 / 1 / 0 / ~28
Junin, Buenos Aires	October 16, 2010	Buenos Aires, Argentina	1	0 fatalities	F2 tornado.
2011 Chaco tornado	January 26, 2011	Laboulaye, Córdoba	1	6 injuries	On January 26, 2011, a tornado formed over Laboulaye Córdoba, leaving 60 homes damaged. There were only six injuries. The trail of destruction of the tornado was 2 kilometres (1.2 mi) long and 250 metres (820 ft) wide. The tornado was rated F2.
2012 Buenos Aires tornadoes and derecho event	April 4, 2012	Buenos Aires, Buenos Aires	5	~17 fatalities	On April 4, 2012, Greater Buenos Aires was hit by a very severe thunderstorm and a derecho, which produced 5 tornadoes with F1 and F2 intensities. Seventeen fatalities were reported in various locations.
2013 Argentina tornadoes	December 2, 2013	Villa del Rosario(Córdoba), Chivilcoy (Buenos Aires), Santiago del Estero (capital)	3	3 fatalities, some injuries	Possible tornado from a bow-echo mesovortex, estimated an F3, severely destroyed 90% of the town of Villa del Rosario (Córdoba), causing 2 deaths. It's likely that this event was an extreme downburst. A tornado, rated F1 or F2, hit the city of Chivilcoy, causing much destruction, where 1 death was reported. An F2 tornado occurred in the city of Santiago del Estero, causing trees to fall and destroying homes, possibly having a classification higher than F2. It's also possible that this event was a downburst.

== Brazil ==
Twenty-five of Brazil's 26 states have recorded at least one tornado since 1970, the only one without confirmation being the state of Acre. Even the Federal District has experienced tornado episodes, but most of them were landspouts. This is due to the tropical, semi-humid climate present throughout the country, but the southern states, the interior of São Paulo state in the Southeast, and southern Mato Grosso do Sul in the Center-West, are the most recorded, accounting for 95% of the country's tornadoes. This is because they are part of the "Pasillo de los tornados", a region of South America prone to tornadoes due to the meeting of warm, humid air masses from the Amazon rainforest, Gran Chaco, and the Atlantic Ocean, which meet cold, dry air masses from Patagonia and Antarctica, in addition to the hot, dry winds from the Andes mountain range. These areas are also influenced by severe convective storms from the Río de la Plata basin. A Harvard study revealed that the frequency of tornadoes in this alley is not even higher due to the ruggedness of the Amazon rainforest, which reduces vorticity near the ground. Although this region experiences a high number of severe storms throughout the year, this limitation significantly reduces the chances of tornado formation. Possibly, without this obstacle, the region could have a frequency equal to or even greater than that of North America.

== Chile ==
Event	Date	Area	Tornadoes	Casualties	Notes	F#
1633 Carelmapu tornado	14 May 1633	Carelmapu, Chile	1	0	Destroyed a chapel, cemetery and trees. Unofficially rated EF2.	EF2
1934 Concepción tornado	27 May 1934	Concepción, Chile	1	27 fatalities, 599 injuries	F3 tornado.	F3
San Carlos tornado	31 May 2013	San Carlos, Chile	1	2 injuries	Damaged a school and some houses. Blew off roofs. Officially rated an EF2.	EF2
Los Ángeles tornado	30 May 2019	Los Ángeles, Chile	1	18 injuries	A tornado overturned vehicles and damaged more than 120 homes in the northern part of Los Angeles. Rated an EF2.	EF2
Biobío tornado	31 May 2019	Talcahuano and Concepción, Chile	1	1 fatality, 24 injuries	A tornadic waterspout caused casualties and damaged at least 546 homes. Rated an EF1.	EF1
Puerto Varas tornado	25 May 2025	Puerto Varas	1	13+ injuries	Caused widespread damage in the city.	EF1 (Preliminary)

== Colombia ==
Event	Date	Area	Tornadoes	Casualties	Notes	F#
2001 Soledad tornado	1 June 2001	Soledad, Atlantico	1	4 fatalities, ~300 injuries	The F2 tornado left 2 people dead, 300 injured, and more than 500 homes destroyed.	F2
2006 Barranquilla tornado	15 September 2006	Barranquilla, Colombia	1	19 injuries	F3 tornado, produced by a high-precipitation supercell thunderstorm.	F3
2007 Bogotá tornado	6 November 2007	Bogotá, Cundinamarca, Colombia	1	1 injury	Roofs were torn off of buildings, including a car dealership. Windows were blown out and trees were uprooted. 1 person was injured.	F1
2008 Soledad tornado	23 May 2008	Soledad, Atlántico	1	15 injuries	A school was struck by the tornado, injuring 3 children. 500 homes were damaged.	F1
El Rosal landspout	3 September 2018	El Rosal, Cundinamarca	1	0	Strong winds hit the municipality of Tenjo, Cundinamarca, leaving 31 homes without roof and several fallen trees on vehicles and power cables, as well as a service station, two restaurants and a school affected. The winds also felt strongly in the northwest of Bogotá, exactly on 80th Street, at the height of the Guadua Bridge, where citizens recorded a kind of tornado that raised tiles, stones, and sticks, among other objects. No injured people were reported, but 200 people were affected by the landspout.	
Yopal, Colombia tornado	26 August 2018	Citadel La Bendicion, near Yopal, Casanare	1	1 injury	The strong tornado hit the residents of the citadel of La Bendición, leaving a balance of approximately 250 people from 70 affected families, and 65 damaged houses, of which more than 50 are considered destroyed.	
Riohacha-Valledupar, Colombia tornado	13 September 2015	On the road between Riohacha and Valledupar	1	Unknown	In a YouTube video published by the user Shcastro, it can be seen what appears to be a tornado on the road that leads from Riohacha to Valledupar. It is visualized that in the distance a very strong storm develops that had the ability to create the eddy, which fortunately did not cause damage due to occur in the open field.	
La Ceja, Colombia tornado	14 September 2018	La Ceja, Antioquia	1	Unknown	Heavy rains in the municipality of La Ceja, Antioquia caused flooding in several neighborhoods in the urban area and damage to crops in rural areas. During the rainfall, residents of La Ceja recorded what appears to be a tornado of small proportions, something unusual in the region.	

== Paraguay ==
Event	Date	Area	Tornadoes	Casualties	Notes	F#
1926 Encarnación tornado	September 20, 1926	Encarnación, Paraguay	1	300–600 fatalities, 500 injuries	Around 6:45 p.m., an F5 devastated the city of Encarnación. At least 300 people were killed, making it the deadliest tornado in South American history.	F5
1964 Paraguay multi-vortex tornado	? ? 1964	Paraguay	1	0	An extremely large, long-tracked tornado with extreme multi-vortex activity, left a gigantic scar over rural/forested areas of eastern Paraguay. Extreme forest damage and extremely intense ground scouring occurred. This tornado wasn't discovered until decades later, by LANDSAT satellites. It's presumed that this tornado reached F4-F5 during its course.	F4 or F5
2017 San Javier tornado	8 April 2017	Paraguay	1	2 fatalities, some injuries	On the evening of April 8, a strong tornado struck the small village of San Javier, Paraguay, located just north of San Ignacio. A church and some small brick homes were leveled, and several other structures sustained significant damage, including the town clinic, school, and police station. Many trees were snapped or uprooted, two people were killed, and others were injured.	FU
2023 Mbocayaty del Yhaguy tornado	28 October 2023	Mbocayaty del Yhaguy, Paraguay	1	1 fatality, some injuries	A wedge tornado struck the small town of Mbocayaty del Yhaguy. The tornado partially destroyed houses, and the event killed one person and injured several others.	F2

== Uruguay ==
Event	Date	Area	Tornadoes	Casualties	Notes
Vichadero tornado	25 October 1968	Vichadero, Uruguay	-	1 fatality, 12 injuries	
Fray Marcos tornado	April 21, 1970	Fray Marcos, Uruguay	1	11 fatalities	F4. It was the strongest tornado in the history of Uruguay.
Migues, Canelones	27 January 2001	Uruguay	1	0 fatalities	F2/3 tornado
Canelones	March 10, 2002	Uruguay	1	2 fatalities	F2/3 tornado, $30 million damage.
Dolores tornado	15 April 2016	Dolores, Soriano, Uruguay	1	7 fatalities, 250 injuries	An F3 tornado caused heavy damage to buildings in the city of Dolores, killing seven people.
Tacuarembó tornado	March 3, 2025	Tacuarembó, Uruguay	1	None	A tornado occurred in an open field; Some trees were snapped. The event caused no human deaths or injuries, but it killed some animals.
