= Isla Verde, Argentina =

Town in Córdoba Province, Argentina

Isla Verde
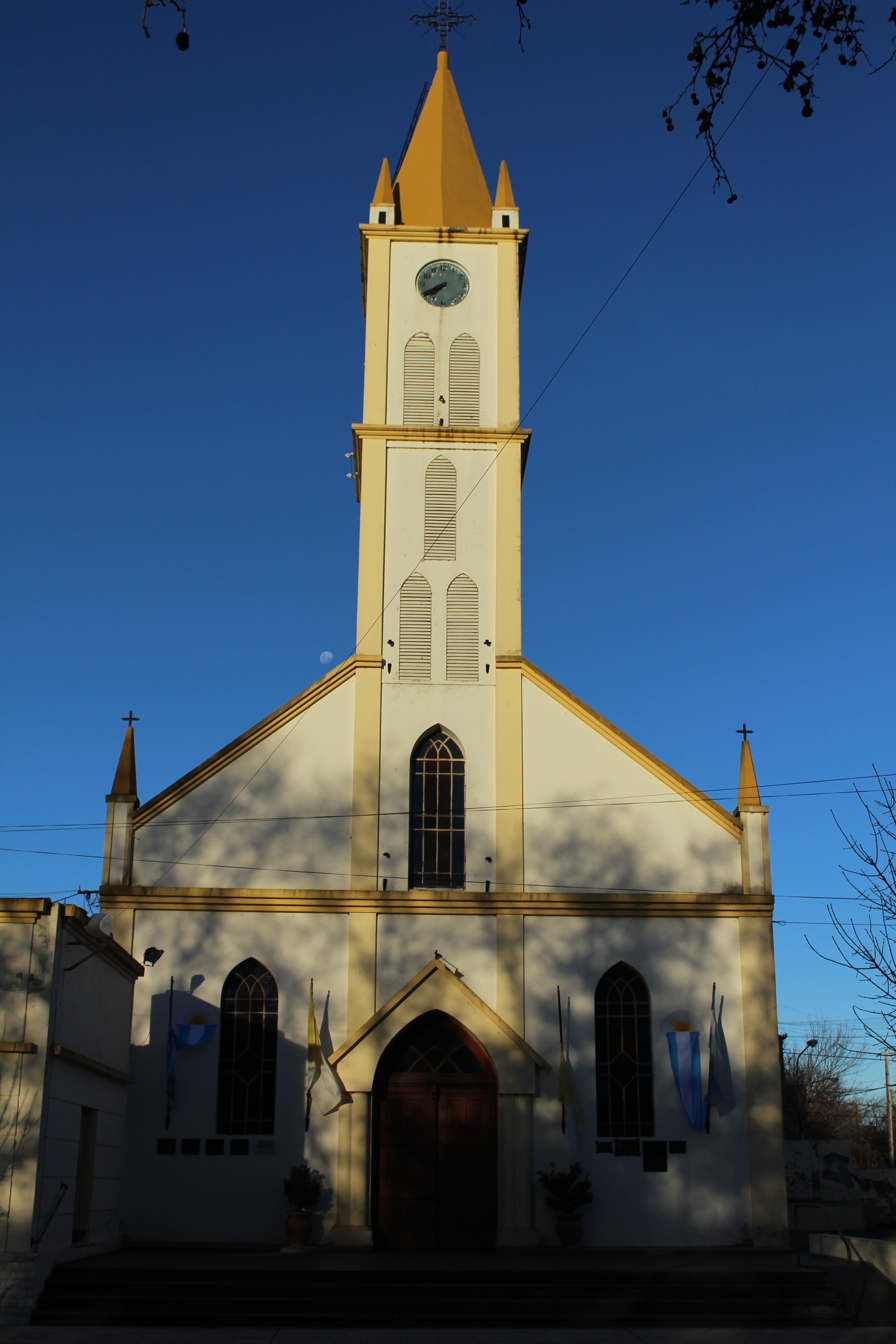

- Location in Argentina Isla Verde (Córdoba Province)
- Coordinates: 33°14.00′S 62°24.00′W
- Country: Argentina
- Province: Córdoba
- Department: Marcos Juárez
- Founded: November 28, 1901 (124 years ago)
- Elevation: 124 m (407 ft)

Population (2022 census)
  - Total: 4,374
- Time zone: UTC-3 (ART)
- CPA base: S2661
- Dialing code: +54 03468

Isla Verde is a town in Marcos Juárez Department of Córdoba Province, Argentina.
