= 1926 Encarnación tornado =

1926 F5 tornado in Paraguay

- Damage from the tornado

Meteorological history
- Date: September 20, 1926
- Duration: Unknown

F5 tornado
- on the Fujita scale
- Highest winds: >261 mph (420 km/h)

Overall effects
- Fatalities: 300 (some estimates state up to 500)
- Injuries: 500 (Exact number unknown)
- Areas affected: Encarnación, Paraguay

On September 20, 1926, a large and deadly tornado moved through Encarnación, located in the country of Paraguay. The tornado, known as the Encarnación tornado or Encarnación cyclone of 1926, heavily damaged the town, killing up to three hundred people. The tornado would eventually receive a rating of F5 on the Fujita scale; it remains the deadliest tornado in South American history.

== Tornado summary ==
Around 6:45 p.m., a storm front moved from the south, with heavy rains, lightning, microburst winds and an extremely violent tornado.

Two hurricane-force wind events (downbursts) with estimated speeds of more than 250 kilometres per hour (160 mph), accompanied by torrential downpours and intense lightning, occurred near the city.

The waterspout formed over the Paraná River about 200 metres (660 ft) from the Paraguayan coast. The tornado entered through the pier - built in 1918, the main source of communication with Argentina and the transport of cargo and passengers - being totally destroyed, destroying practically everything that today would be the former Lower Zone of the city, as well as houses, monuments, buildings, etc. The balance was hundreds of dead and wounded, and heavy economic losses, which devastated the economy of the city, the effects of which would be felt in the following years.

== Aftermath ==
Some took advantage of the destruction to loot things and valuables from the collapsed buildings, but several volunteers also emerged, many of them anonymous, others with names and surnames, such as the head of the plant, Juan Pedotti, who when disconnecting the motors and lowering the keys, was electrocuted, preventing others from having contact with the fallen cables, thus saving many lives.

The city's priest, José Kreusser, helped hundreds of injured people amid the rubble. Along with Jorge Memmel, they crossed the Paraná River to ask for help in the neighboring city of Posadas, Argentina, where no one knew about the tornado that moved through the area a short time prior. A student party was taking place at the provincial Government House, in which many Encarnacenos participated, and it was immediately suspended when the news was known; and the governor at the time, Héctor Barreyro, called for solidarity, bringing together teams of doctors, nurses and nuns. The families from Encarnación who were left homeless were housed in Posadas, blood banks were formed. The boats that were in the port of Posadas were mobilized to provide help, and the railroads became floating hospitals and improvised shelters.

In Asunción, the news was known at 5:45 a.m. the next day, through a telegram transmitted from Posadas and signed by the civil chief. The telegram read: "Yesterday 6:45 (pm) a strong cyclone devastated most of Encarnación, a lower city. There are numerous victims." Citizens and national authorities began to move. The railroad arrived from Asunción in seven hours to the city of Encarnación, carrying doctors, medicines, clothes, food, etc. Some filmmakers traveled to film and document what happened, and then toured the cities of the country and abroad, showing the films to raise funds for relief and alleviate in some way the needs of the victims. As gratitude to the people of Posadas for their help, some time later, the authorities erected a monolith and placed plaques at the foot of the Statue of Liberty in Posadas, located in the Republic of Paraguay Park.

== See also ==
- List of F5, EF5, and IF5 tornadoes
- List of South American tornadoes and tornado outbreaks
- List of tornadoes causing 100 or more deaths
- Tri-State tornado outbreak
